= Demotika =

Demotika may refer to:

- Greek folk music
- Didymoteicho, a town in Thrace historically known as Demotika (Bulgarian: Dimotika; Turkish: Dimetoka)
  - Lordship of Demotika, a medieval crusader state centred on Didymoteicho
- Demotika, Turkey, referring to the site of ancient Didymateiche
- Battle of Demotika, a battle during the Byzantine civil war of 1352–1357
