= Ioannis Genovellis =

Greek politician

Ioannis N. Genovellis
- Ιωάννης N. Γενοβέλης
- Pronunciation: Ioannis Genovellis
- Born: circa 1760
- Died: 1841; Vonitsa, Aitolia-Akarnania
- Citizenship: Ottoman Empire
- Occupations: Politician, Military man
- Employer: Filiki Eteria
- Known for: Contributions to the Greek War of Independence
- Title: Prefect

Signature
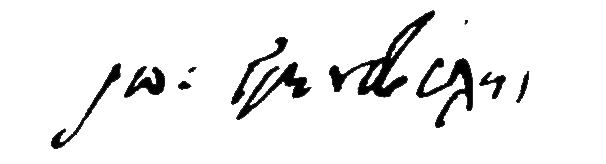

Ioannis Genovellis (Preveza, circa 1760 – 1841, Vonitsa) was a governor, a member of Filiki Eteria, a military man and a politician, who in 1825 was elected as the first prefect of Athens. He excelled both in the military and in politics as he showed great patriotism and bravery. He was appointed as a major general and a senator. Apart from his political talents, Genovellis was linguistically cultivated having heeded the teachings of priest Dionysus of Akarnana. He did not have any children and lived as a pensioner in Vonitsa. He most likely died in 1841 at an age of over 80 years old. From 1843 onwards, his widowed wife received a monthly pension of 30 drachmae.

== Origins ==
Genovellis was born in Preveza (circa 1760) into one of the most powerful families of the town, which was of Italian origin and had settled in Preveza after its second capture by the Venetians in 1718. In documents dating back to the Venetian period, the family name is written as Ginavelli or Ginovelli or Genovelli. In a document that dates back to 1787, he is referenced as Zuanne di Nicolo Ginavelli in a register of men from Preveza who are able to bear arms and were between the ages of 16 and 60. He was adequately educated having studied in Corfu and Pavia. His father, Nikolaos Genovellis, was a wealthy person and from 1779 to 1789 a notary. In the Venetian census of Preveza (circa 1790), he is referenced as a parishioner of the church of Saint Charalambos.

== Life before the Greek War of Independence ==
After the Battle of Nicopolis in 1798, Ioannis Genovellis was employed in the civil service of Preveza (community, sanitation) where he worked as a notary for a few years. Notarial document 43 (numbered by Philaretos Vitalis) of the archive of the Metropolis of Nicopolis and Preveza was, among others, written by him. The recording was stopped due to the Battle of Nicopolis according to a note he wrote himself in the margins of the document. Ioannis Genovellis had a particularly important role in the administration of Preveza when it was a preferential regime (Autonomy 1800–1807). At the beginning of this period the Scholarship by Konstantinos Athanasiadis or Manos was created which was led by the «patriotic, philharmonic and cultivated Ioannis Genovellis» as he was described by the bishop of Arta and Preveza, Serafeim.

It is not precisely known when he was appointed as Ali Pasha’s general manager in Preveza and supplier of the army and the fleet according to Ioannis F. Dimaratos. According to British traveller William M. Leak, Genovellis developed commercial activity intensively during the reign of Ali Pasha. When he encountered another British traveller, Thomas S. Hughes, on the evening of the 27th of December 1813, he was acting as if he had acquired the rank of governor of Preveza. It is mentioned that Ioannis Genovellis was initiated in Filiki Eteria just like Anastasios Gerogiannis, Mamati, Louropoulos, Dipla and Ginacka. Just before the beginning of the Greek War of Independence, the famous meeting between Ioannis Paparrigopoulos (he was then working as an interpreter for the Russian consulate in Patra) and Ali Pasha occurred in his residence. According to Panagiotis Aravantinos, Ioannis Genovellis served as the governor of the town until 1821. He then left Preveza in order to take part in the Greek War of Independence. After Genovellis, Konstantinos Moscos was governor of Preveza who was in turn succeeded by Konstantinos Leukaditis. Before Genovellis, though, responsible for the governance of Preveza for two years was Georgios Louropoulos who was not favored by Ali Pasha and was thus replaced by Genovellis.

== Life after 1820 ==
After the fall of Ali Pasha at the hands of Hursit Pasha, Ioannis Genovellis was frightened as he had previously relied on the fact that Ali Pasha had favored him in the past. Therefore, he went to Rumelia and Morias following Ioannis Kolettis with whom he was close friends. The Second National Assembly at Astros, after Ioannis Kolettis took action, appointed him as the eparch of Athens during the age in which the castellan of the keep in Acropolis was Ioannis Gouras. The reference letter Ioannis Kolettis wrote to Gouras is worth mentioning as it is particularly distinctive: «My friend and brother, the very noble sir Ioannis Genovellis has been elected eparch of Athens. He is without question my friend and thus yours as well. So be friends with him in the same way you are with me. Trust him the same way you trust me and think about him as if he were me. Take advice from him for whatever you consider beneficial for our country so that you may as well be popular among those that were governed by him as I am sure you want them to have his gratitude and for me to be your friend. Ioannis Kolettis, June 2nd 1825».

According to Ioannis Makrygiannis and Hlias Vasilias, Ioannis Genovellis took part, along with other warlords from Preveza, in a naval expedition on September 19, 1828, whose end goal was to cut off Vonitsas communication with the rest of the world and block their supply routes from Preveza and finally capture it. The achievements of the captains from Hydra under the leadership of the commander in chief of the Greek army Richard Church was remembered by the old residents of Preveza as the “Kairos me ta Mistikia” (The Time of Secrets) and which is considered folklore music.

Ioannis Kolettis was initially a confidant of Ioannis Kapodistrias and became better known for his actions as a temporary commissioner of the Department of North Messenia in 1828 and of Laconia and South Messenia until the 14th of August, 1829. He then became a senator. During the presidency of Kapodistrias, he was assigned the role of the manager of the department of education of the Typiko (the predecessor of the Evelpidon Academy), the superintendent of Sparta and the eparch of Mani (March 20, 1830). In 1829 he took part in the fourth national assembly at Argos as the plenipotentiary of Epirus. Most likely after he was replaced by Iakovos Cornelius as the eparch of Mani -which was done only after Kapodistrias intervened- Genovellis joined Kolettis’ party who was politically opposed to Ioannis Kapodistrias.
