= Georgios Liologlou =

Greek revolutionary

Georgios Liologlou (Greek: Γεώργιος Λιόλογλου; 1805?−1920) was a Greek revolutionary of the Greek War of Independence.

== Biography ==
Liologlou claimed to have been born in 1805 (Note: Other sources claim he was born in 1819 and that he died in 1932 but that is not possible as he took part in the Greek War of Independence, which began in 1821.) in Isaakio of Evros. He participated in the uprising of the inhabitants of the Didymoteicho region during the Greek Revolution of 1821, which ended as a failure in Thrace after the defeat of the revolutionary forces in the Battle of Saltikio (now Lavara). Following the complete destruction of his home town, Isaakio, by the Ottoman forces under Hadjiestrev Agha, he and his grandfather were reduced to work as the Agha's serfs, after the possessions of Greek inhabitants of the village were confiscated. He later was a priest in Didymoteicho.

He died in 1920 at the claimed age of 115,^{[a]} just after Western Thrace, including his home town, had become incorporated into Greece.

== Sources ==
- Αδαμάντιος Ταμβακίδης, Γυμνασιάρχης, Παράρτημα, Γ' τόμος, «Θρακικά», p. 62
