= Sitochori =

Sitochori may refer to several places in Greece:

- Sitochori, Messenia, a village in Messenia
- Sitochori, Evros, a village in the municipality of Didymoteicho, Evros regional unit
- Sitochori, Larissa, a village in the Larissa (regional unit)
- Sitochori, Serres, a village in the municipal unit of Achinos, Serres regional unit
