= Metropolis of Didymoteicho, Orestias and Soufli =

Metropolis of the Greek Orthodox Church

Holy Metropolis of Didymoteicho, Orestias and Soufli

Orthodox
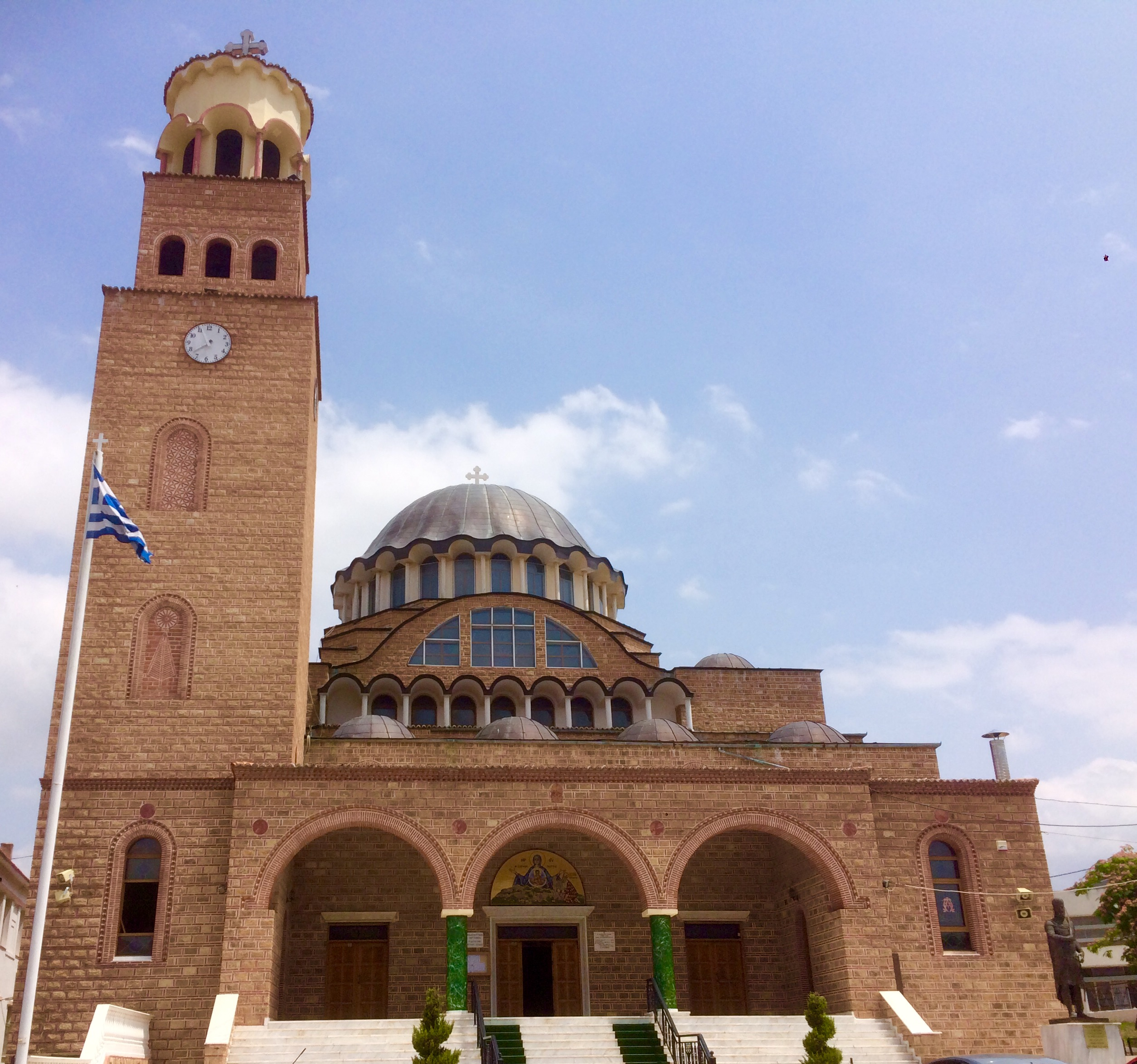
- Church of Panagia Elefterotria in Didymoticho

Location
- Country: Greece
- Headquarters: Didymoteicho

Statistics
- Parishes: 103

Information
- Denomination: Eastern Orthodox
- Rite: Byzantine Rite
- Established: c. 434
- Language: Greek

Current leadership
- Parent church: Ecumenical Patriarchate of Constantinople and Church of Greece
- Governance: Episcopal
- Patriarch: Bartholomew I of Constantinople
- Metropolitan: Damaskinos Karpathakis

Website
- https://www.imdos.gr/

The Holy Metropolis of Didymoteicho, Orestias and Soufli (Greek: Ιερά Μητροπολίτης Διδυμοτείχου, Ορεστιάδος και Σουφλίου) is a diocese of the Greek Orthodox Church, with its seat in Didymoteicho in western Thrace. Since 2009 its current Metropolitan is Damaskinos Karpathakis.

== History ==
The diocese was first mentioned in 434-435 when Bishop Hierophilos was transferred from Trapezou to the Diocese of Plotinoupolis; Didymoteicho was referred to as one of the cities within the province of Hemimontus. It was also mentioned in the Second Council of Nicaea as having a bishop named Georgios. During the Fourth Council of Constantinople it was transferred to the province of Rhodope in which it was first referred to as the bishopric of Didymouteicho; Leo VI the Wise noted that Didymouteicho was the seat of the Metropolis of Traianoupolis. In 1189, Isaac II Angelos reorganized the Metropolis of Taianoupolis and formed the new diocese of Didymouteicho.

In March 1821, the metropolis of Drystra and Proslav was transferred to the diocese of Didymotaicho.

The diocese is one of the few metropolises still remaining after Ottoman rule. Extensive islamification continued until the Russo-Turkish War when Russian troops entered the city in April 1828. The resulting Treaty of Adrianople allowed for greater religious freedoms for the Christian communities, and many new churches were built around that time; the reforms of the Tanzimat, specifically the Edict of Gülhane expanded those freedoms and rights.

The area was contented during the Balkan Wars; in 1917 Metropolitan Philaretos was moved to a monastery in Veliko Tarnovo, Bulgaria and later to Sophia where he remained until 1919.

In 1924, Soufli was attached to the diocese from its own metropolis. In 1931, the diocese of Neo Oristias was dissolved and absorbed into the diocese of Didymoteicho. The city was occupied during the German invasion of Greece on April 7, 1941. The diocese assumed all administrative responsibilities as the German occupation didn't establish an occupational government in the region.

== Bishops ==
- Meletios (Vyzantios) (2 January 1847 - 18 August 1849)
- Meletios (Siphnios) (22 August 1849 - 3 June 1860)
- Meletios (Kavasilas) (2 November 1860 - 16 November 1868)
- Dionysius (Charitonidis) (16 November 1868 - 1 May 1873)
- Sophronios (Christidis) (1 May 1873 - 23 November 1874)
- Meletios (Kavasilas) (23 November 1874 - 6 June 1877)
- Methodios (Aronis) (12 May 1878 - 30 April 1893)
- Philaretos (Vapheidis) (6 May 1899 - 21 February 1928)
- Ioakeim (Sigalas) (21 February 1928 - 13 August 1957)
- Konstantinos (Poulos) (13 November 1957 - 13 July 1974)
- Agathangelos (Tabouratzakis) (15 July 1974 - 23 October 1986)
- Nikiphoros (Archangelidis) (19 November 1988 - 4 October 2009)
- Damaskinos Karpathakis (12 October 2009 – Present)

== See also ==
- Didymoteicho Fortress
