= Evgeniko =

Evgeniko Ευγενικό
- Settlement
- Location within Greece
- Coordinates: 41°25′N 26°21′E
- Country: Greece
- Administrative region: East Macedonia and Thrace
- Regional unit: Evros
- Municipality: Didymoteicho
- Municipal unit: Didymoteicho
- Community: Mani

Population (2021)
  - Total: 60
- Time zone: UTC+2 (EET)
  - Summer (DST): UTC+3 (EEST)

Evgeniko (Greek: Ευγενικό, before 1954: Δελήτιον – Delitio) is a village in the northeastern part of the Evros regional unit in Greece. It is located at the foot of low hills by the side of the river Erythropotamos. Evgeniko is part of the community of Mani within the municipality of Didymoteicho. It is 3.5 km south of Sitochori, 5 km northwest of Mani, 16 km northwest of Didymoteicho and 17 km southwest of Orestiada.

== Population ==
Year	Population
1991	241
2001	133
2011	85
2021	60

== History ==
Originally, the village was located 2 km north, at the Palaiochoria ("old village") site. Its Ottoman name was Delimosluk (Ντελίμοσλουκ) which was eventually corrupted to Delimis (Ντελίμις). The new village was founded in 1922 and renamed to Delitio (Δελήτιο). Due to the benefaction of the shipping magnate Eugenios Eugenidis, who provided for the village's water supply, it was later given its current name.

== See also ==
- List of settlements in the Evros regional unit
