= Didymoteicho Fortress =

Fortress in Didymoteicho, Greece

- Κάστρο του Διδυμοτείχου
- Didymoteicho, Thrace, Greece
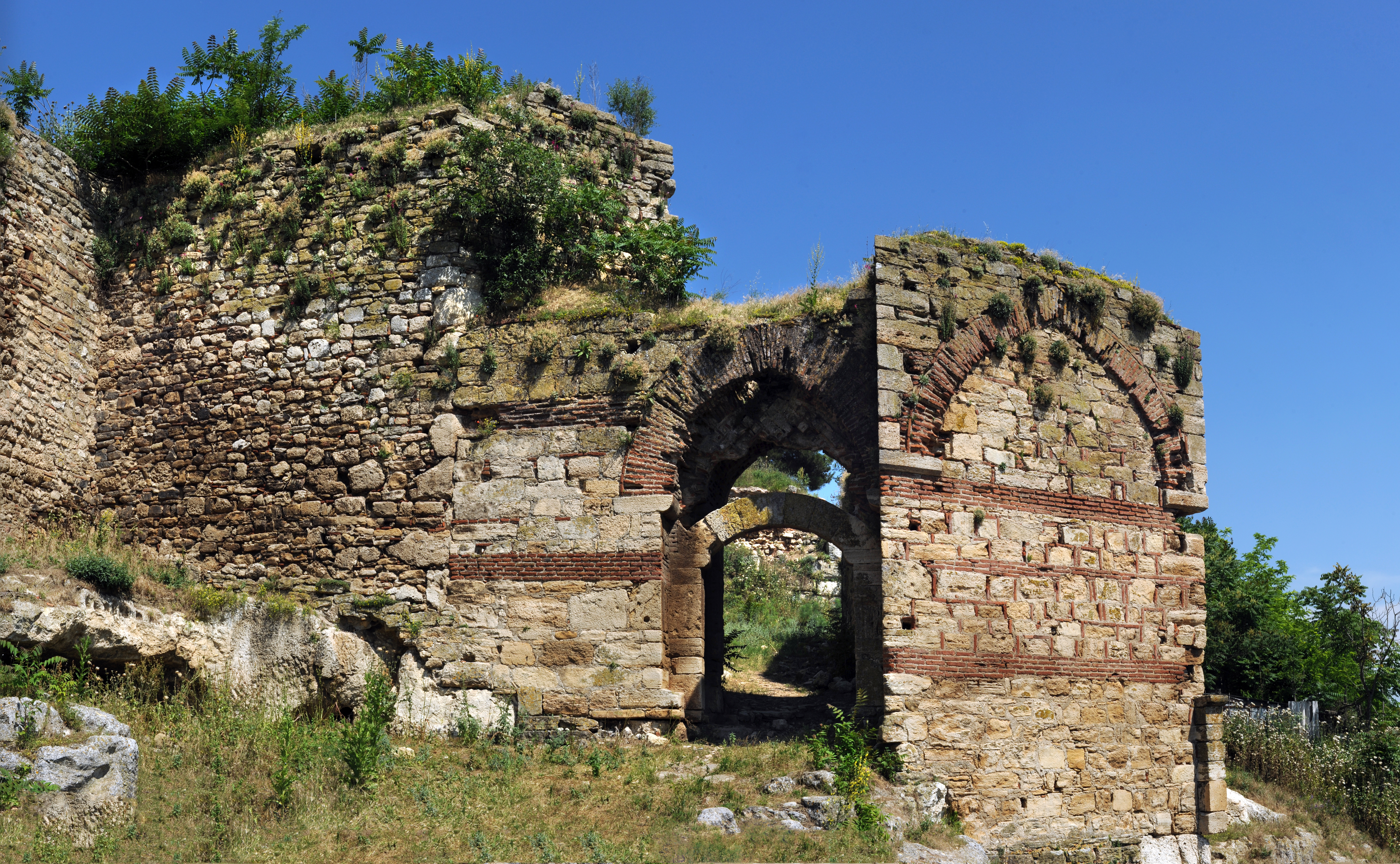
- The Kallioporta Gate of the Byzantine citadel of Didymoteicho Fortress (2012)

Site information
- Type: hilltop citadel
- Owner: Greek Ministry of Culture
- Controlled by: Byzantine Empire 6th century–1204, 1243–1361; Latin Empire 1204–1225; Empire of Thessalonica 1225–1230; Second Bulgarian Empire 1230–1243; Ottoman Empire 1361–1915; Bulgaria 1915–1919
- Open to the public: Yes
- Condition: ruin

Location
- Coordinates: 41.205836°N 26.29985°E

Site history
- Built by: Byzantine Empire
- Materials: hewn stone (ashlar)
- Battles/wars: Bulgarian siege (1206)

The Didymoteicho Fortress or Castle (Greek: Κάστρο του Διδυμοτείχου), is an ancient and medieval hilltop citadel complex in the town of Didymoteicho, Thrace, Greece. It has been an important landmark since ancient times due to the strong fortification surrounding it. The castle is accompanied by several myths, one of the most famous is that of the Forty Arches, and is where Charles XII, King of Sweden, is said to have been imprisoned by the Turks.

== Location ==
Located on the hilltop, strategically placed, due in-part to its strategic location overlooking both the town of Didymoteicho, the Erythropotamos River and the road to Constantinople, it is one of the most important Byzantine-era castles in Thrace and the Balkans.

== History ==
According to the 6th-century historian Procopius, the reconstruction of the walls of Didymoteicho took place during the reign of Justinian I. The castle experienced several long sieges, and as a result The walls were subsequently strengthened during the reign of Constantine V in 751.

In 1206, the fortress (known as Demotika) was besieged by Bulgarian Tsar Kaloyan, who took advantage of the disintegration of the Byzantine Empire. The fortress was later occupied by the Latin Empire. In 1303, with the re-establishment of Byzantine rule, master builder Constantine Tarchaneiotes strengthened the fortifications. This is supported by Topography of building materials and methods that suggest the occupation by Byzantine forces continued into the later period of the empire.

In October 1352, during the Byzantine civil war of 1352–1357, John V Palaiologos, with military support from Serbia commanded by Gradislav Borilović, engaged John VI Kantakouzenos (with backing from Orhan I, the Ottoman bey). The two armies met in an open field close to the fortress walls. The more numerous Ottomans defeated the Serbs, and Kantakouzenos retained the power, while Palaiologos fled to Venetian-controlled Tenedos. According to Kantakouzenos about 7,000 Serbs fell at the battle (deemed exaggerated), while Nikephoros Gregoras (1295–1360) gave the number as 4,000. The battle was the first major engagement of the Ottomans on European soil, and made Stefan Dušan realize the major growing threat of the Ottomans to Eastern Europe. By 1361, the fortress had fallen to the Ottomans.

In a cave next to the 19th-century Cathedral of Saint Athanasios Charles XII, King of Sweden, is said to have been kept under house arrest by the Ottomans. During the Ottoman rule, the structures were not adequately preserved, and by 1848 the fortress was in a ruinous state sustaining severe damage from various incursions as well as those provoked by the Russians who occupied the city in the course of the two Russo-Turkish wars in 1828–29 and 1877–78.

On the evening 10 August 2020 firefighters where called to deal with a large blaze that had broken out within the castle. At around 20:30 Local residents reported smoke and flames emanating from the fortress complex. Over 20 firefighters with 17 vehicles where at the scene to extinguish the fire, that had engulfed an area of 8 acres It was reported that both the Cathedral of Saint Athanasios and Armenian Church had been in real danger of being lost. However, only dry vegetation was burned, in part thanks to the good coordination and quick response from firefighters and local volunteers, something Mayor Romylos Hatzigiannoglou, emphasized in his message to those involved. The cause of the fire has not been precisely determined and is being investigated by the fire service.

== Description ==
The castle is preserved at its longest length, its Byzantine walls are 1 kilometre (0.62 mi) long and reach a height of 12 meters, with 24 towers in total, some of which bear monograms of Byzantine personalities or decorative and symbolic patterns.

The two central gates of the fortress, known as the Kale Gates, are flanked by five-sided towers dating to the Justinian refurbishment. The West gate facing Erythropotamos river remains intact and contains a smaller gate next to a tower with pointed arches and a court added in the early Ottoman times. Inside the castle there are scattered carved caves which were used as parts of houses. There are a number of Post-Byzantine building within the walls, notably the church of Aghia Aikaterini comprising tombs, the cathedral of Aghios Athanasios (1834), and the church of the Christ (1846).

== Current state ==
Today, 24 towers and post-Byzantine buildings are preserved within the Castle.

== See also ==
- Battle of Demotika
- Metropolis of Didymoteicho, Orestias and Soufli

== Gallery ==
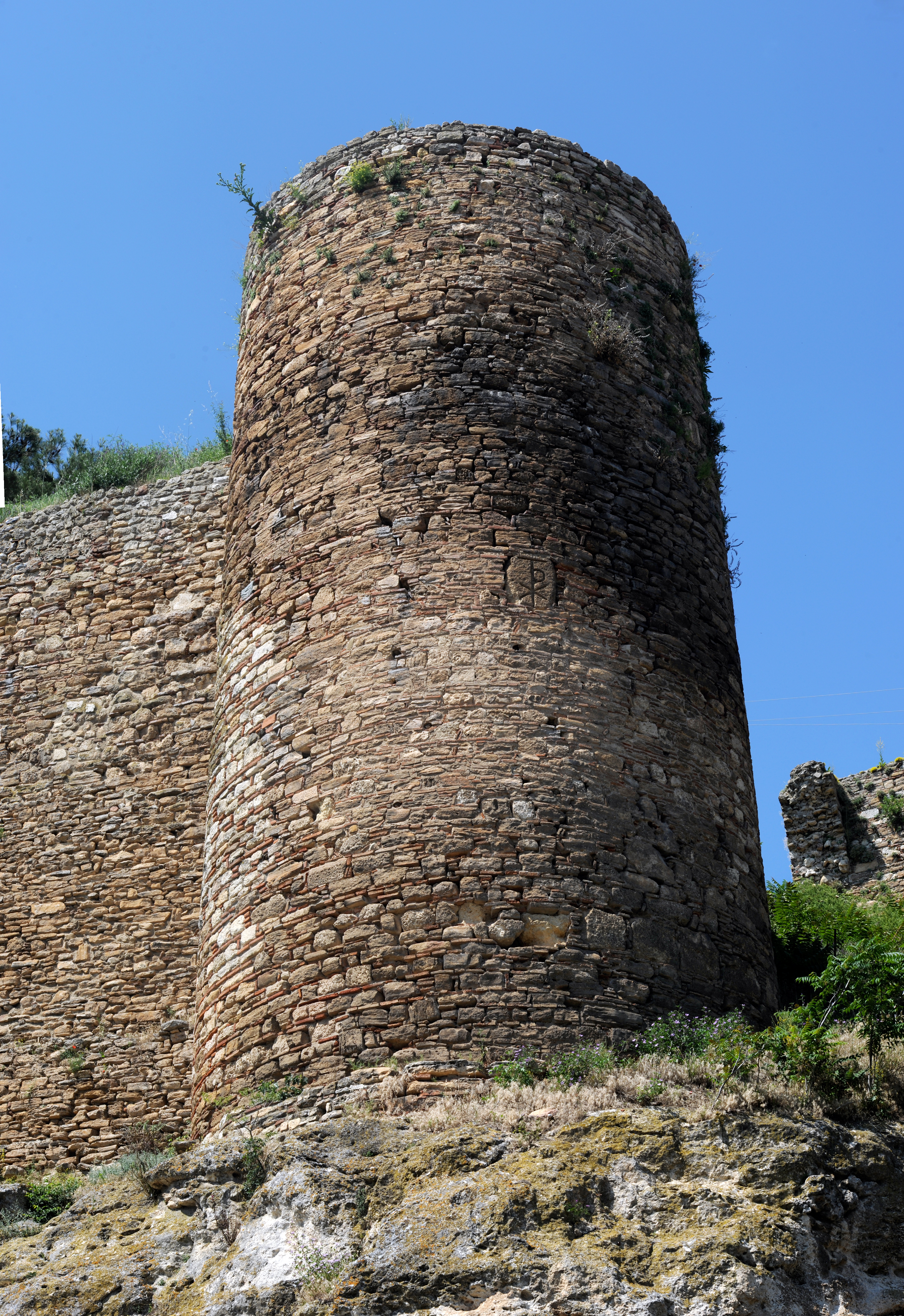
View of Vasilopoula tower

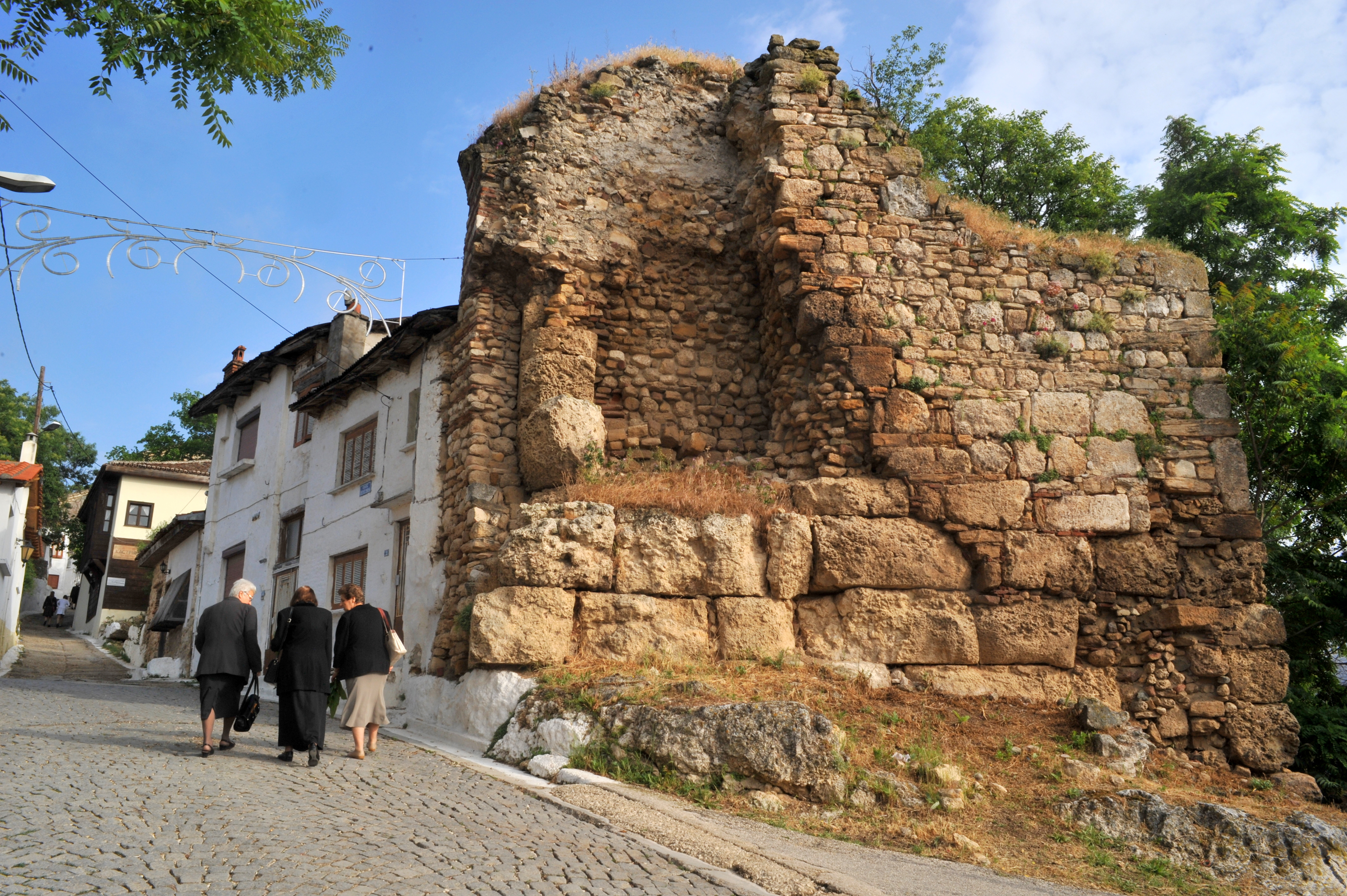
Part of the Castle walls.

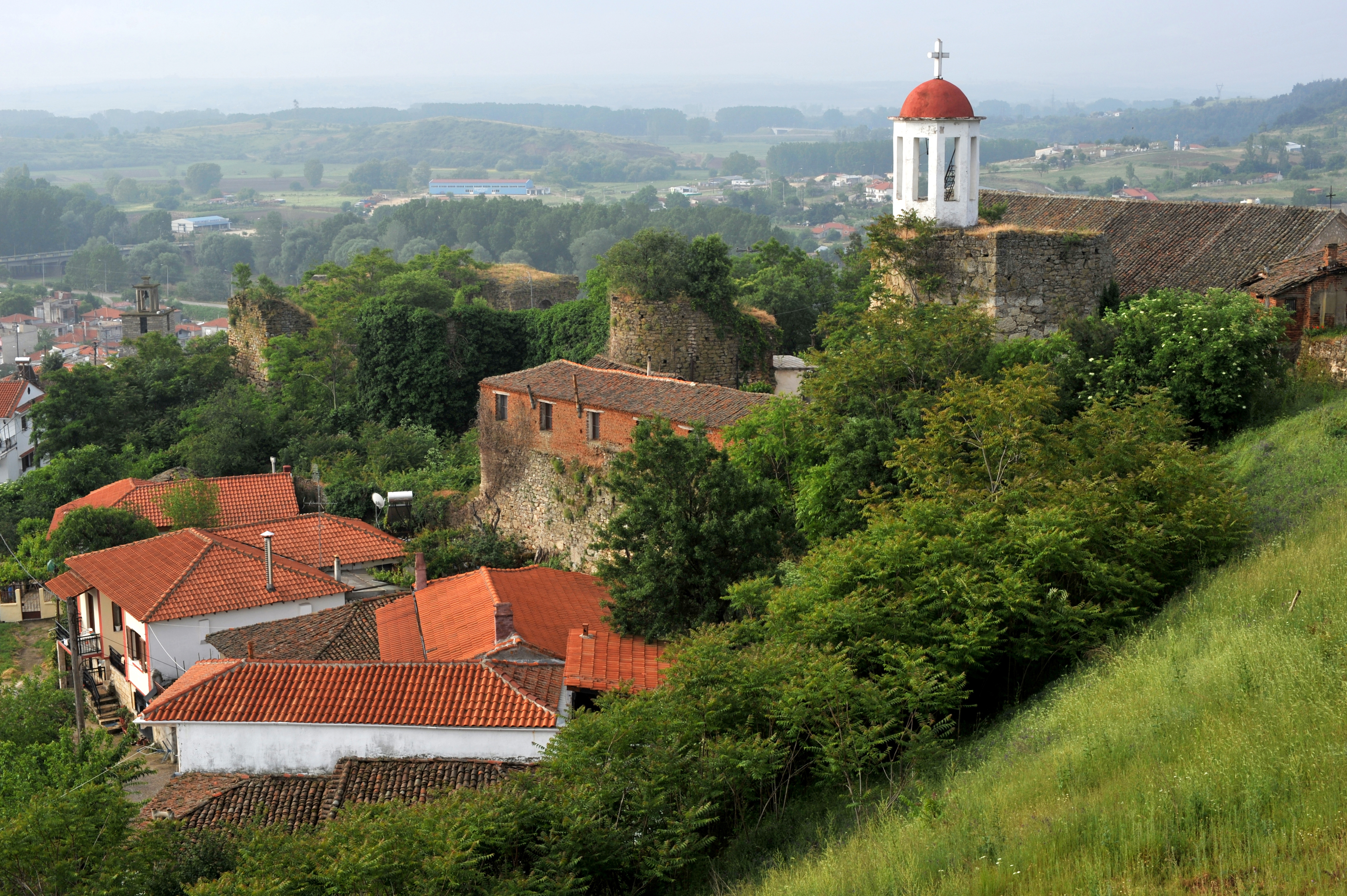
Part of the Castle and the orthodox church of the Savior Christ.

== Bibliography ==
- Ćorović, Vladimir (2001) [1997]. Istorija srpskog naroda (in Serbian) (Internet ed.). Belgrade: Ars Libri.
- Fajfrić, Željko (2000) [1998], Sveta loza Stefana Nemanje (in Serbian) (Internet ed.), Belgrade: Janus; Rastko., chapter 40
- Fine, John V. A. (1994) [1987]. The Late Medieval Balkans: A Critical Survey from the Late Twelfth Century to the Ottoman Conquest. Ann Arbor, Michigan: University of Michigan Press. ISBN 978-0-472-10079-8.
