= Çelebi Sultan Mehmed Mosque =

Ottoman mosque in Didymoteicho, Greece

- Τέμενος Μεχμέτ Α'; Çelebi Sultan Mehmed Camii
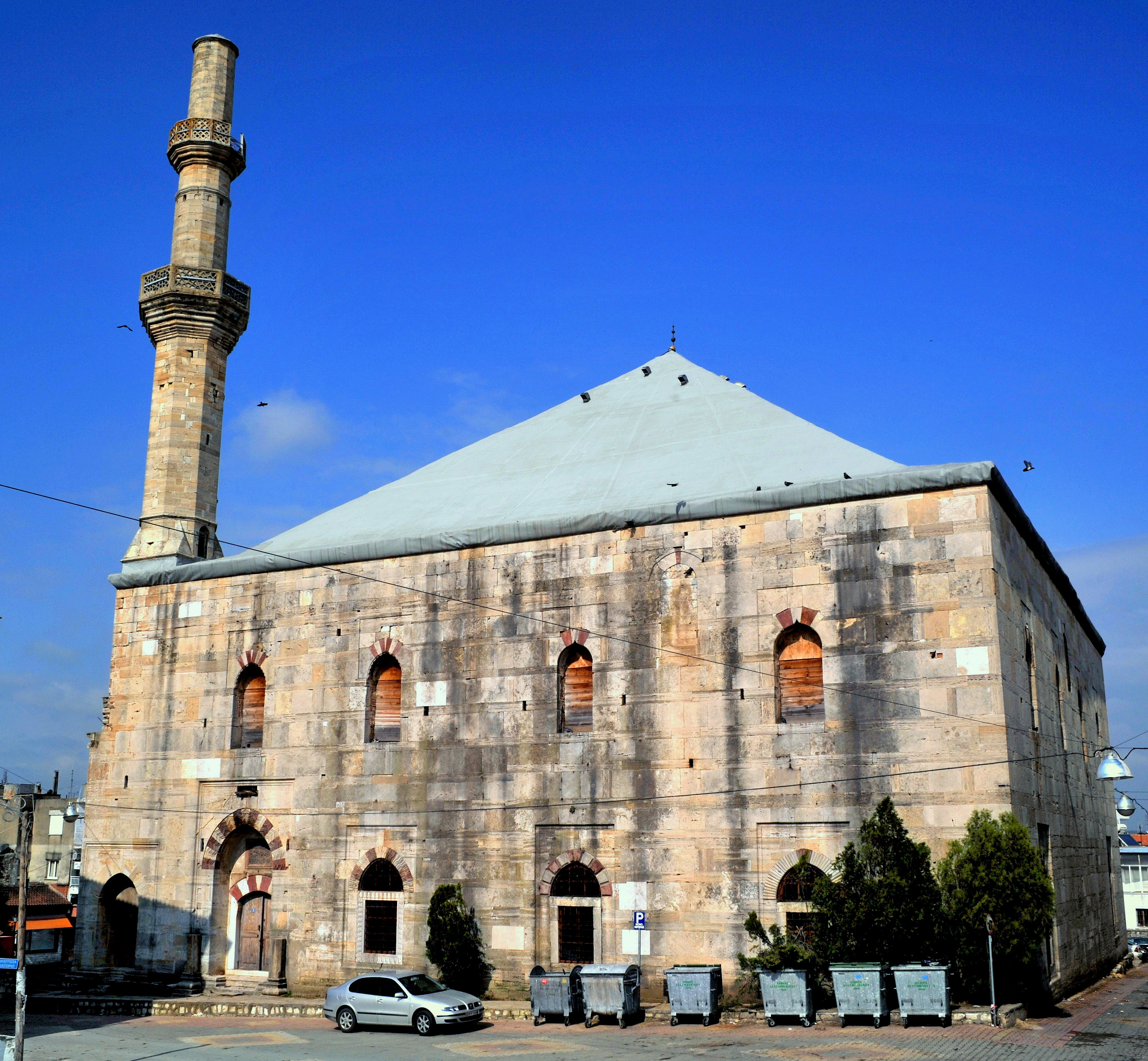
- The former mosque in 2010

- Location of the former mosque in Greece

Religion
- Affiliation: Islam (former)
- Ecclesiastical or organisational status: Mosque (1420–1912); Church (1912–1913); Mosque (1913–1920s)
- Status: Abandoned (as a mosque); Partially restored

Location
- Location: Didymoteicho, East Macedonia and Thrace
- Country: Greece
- Interactive map of Çelebi Sultan Mehmed Mosque
- Coordinates: 41°20′56″N 26°29′38″E

Architecture
- Architect: Ivaz ibn Bayezid
- Type: Mosque
- Founder: Bayezid I; Mehmed I
- Funded by: Dogan ibn Abdullah
- General contractor: Seyid Ali
- Completed: 1420

Specifications
- Minaret: 1
- Materials: cast stone; limestone ashlar

The Çelebi Sultan Mehmed Mosque (Greek: Τέμενος Μεχμέτ Α΄; Turkish: Çelebi Sultan Mehmed Camii), also known as the Bayezid Mosque (Τέμενος Βαγιαζήτ) and the Great Mosque (Turkish: Büyük Camii or Ulu Camii), is a former mosque in Didymoteicho, in the East Macedonia and Thrace region, in the far northeast of Greece. The former mosque was completed in 1420, during the Ottoman era and was last used as a mosque in the 1920s.

== Construction ==
The 17th-century Ottoman traveller Evliya Çelebi records that the mosque was begun under Sultan Bayezid I (r. 1389–1402), but after his death at the Battle of Ankara and the turmoil that followed, it was interrupted. Construction was taken up again under Sultan Mehmed I (r. 1413–1421), and the mosque was completed and inaugurated in March 1420, as recorded in the inscription above the main entrance. A second inscription over a side-entrance records the name of the architect Ivaz ibn Bayezid, the builder (donor) Dogan ibn Abdullah and the local qadi, Seyid Ali, who supervised construction.

== Structure ==
The mosque is a square structure, approximately 30 to 32 metres (98 to 105 ft) on each side, including the walls. The mosque is built with cast stone technique and faced with limestone ashlar blocks, and its external walls are c.2.2 to 2.7 metres (7 ft 3 in to 8 ft 10 in) thick. There are two rows of windows, one at floor level and one above. The main entrance is on the south side, and secondary doors are on the eastern and western sides.

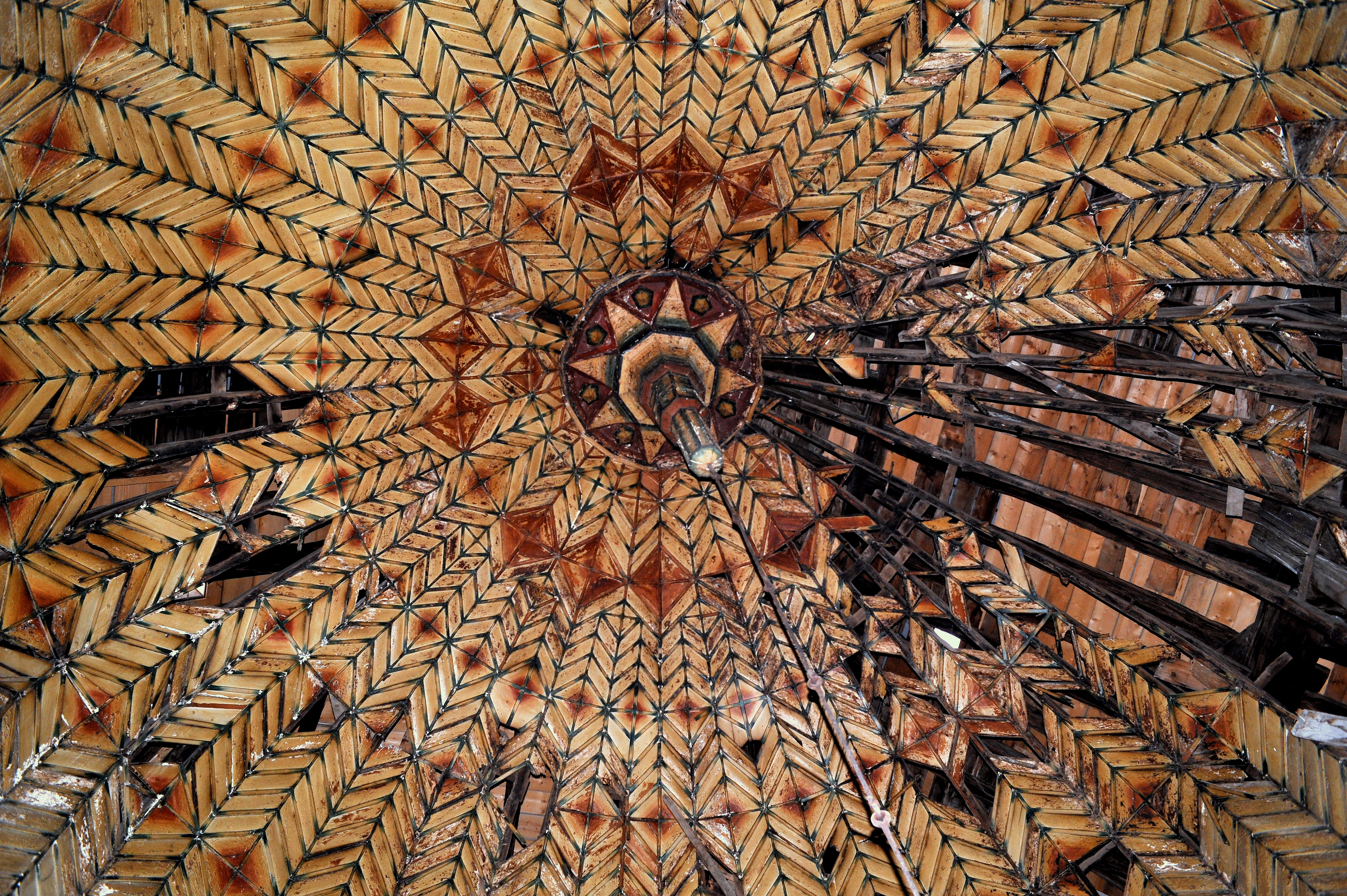
The inner wooden roof with the interior dome

From its layout, the building was apparently originally designed to be crowned by two large domes on the entrance axis, flanked by two smaller ones, while provision was made for addition of a portico surmounted by three smaller domes. The original design was abandoned and was replaced by a lead-covered wooden roof in the shape of a four-sided pyramid, which survives to this day. An interior roof of veneered wooden planks with a cupola, suspended below the actual roof, was added in the 17th century.

The interior space is divided by four square-piers into a central square, which served as the main prayer area, and four elongated spaces around it. The mihrab is located on the southern wall, with a fresco depicting a heavenly city above it. The other walls are decorated with quotes from the Quran, prayers and invocations. The minaret is located on the south-eastern corner. Its upper portion was demolished in 1912, during the Bulgarian occupation in the First Balkan War, when it was converted into a church dedicated to Saint George, but rebuilt in 1913 when the Turks recovered the town. A second balcony was added to the minaret at that time.

== Importance and preservation ==
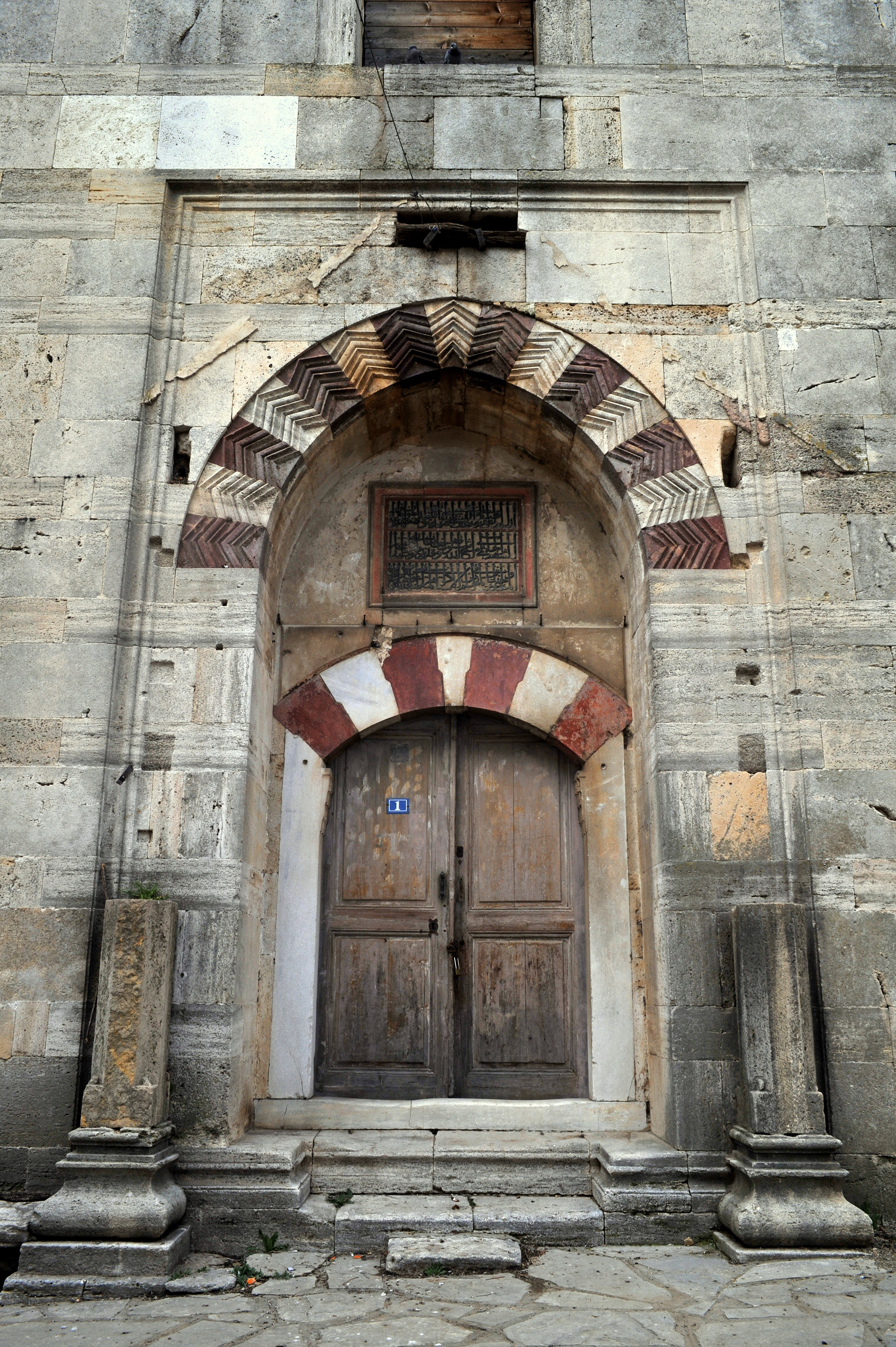
The main entrance of the mosque

The mosque is considered by Greek government officials one of the most important Muslim monuments, not only in Greece, but in all of Europe, as being one of the oldest mosques on European ground. It has been a protected monument since 1946.

The early 15th-century oak roof constitutes "one of the most important wooden monuments in the world" according to A. Bakirtzis, author of a study on Ottoman architecture in Greece. The original lead sheathing was removed in the Second World War, and was replaced post-war first with sheet-metal covers, and later again with lead ones. These were removed in 1998 for repairs to the roof, but work stalled, and the roof was covered by a protective membrane instead, but this was torn in 2008, when a piece of the minaret fell on it.

The structure remained in urgent need of repair, and was considered particularly endangered by a possible earthquake. Finally, on 23 November 2010, the Central Archaeological Council decided on the resumption of restoration work, which is to be funded by national sources as well as using EU funding programmes.

In the early hours of 22 March 2017, during the course of restoration work on the roof, the mosque caught fire. The fire was extinguished after a few hours, but the entire roof was destroyed; damage to the interior and the walls remains unknown.

In February 2022 the mosque was attacked by Greek extremists and Islamophobic banners were hunged. The banners read "the Islamization of Evros must be stopped immediately."

Newer restoration work on the mosque began in 2022 with a total budget of approximately €15 million. The project focused on rebuilding the destroyed lead-covered wooden roof and dome using roughly 7,000 individual wooden elements. Construction was scheduled to conclude in early December 2026, with the monument expected to reopen to the public later that month.

== See also ==
- Islam in Greece
- List of former mosques in Greece
- Ottoman Greece
