= Dionysius V of Constantinople =

Ecumenical Patriarch of Constantinople from 1887 to 1891

- Ecumenical Patriarch of Constantinople
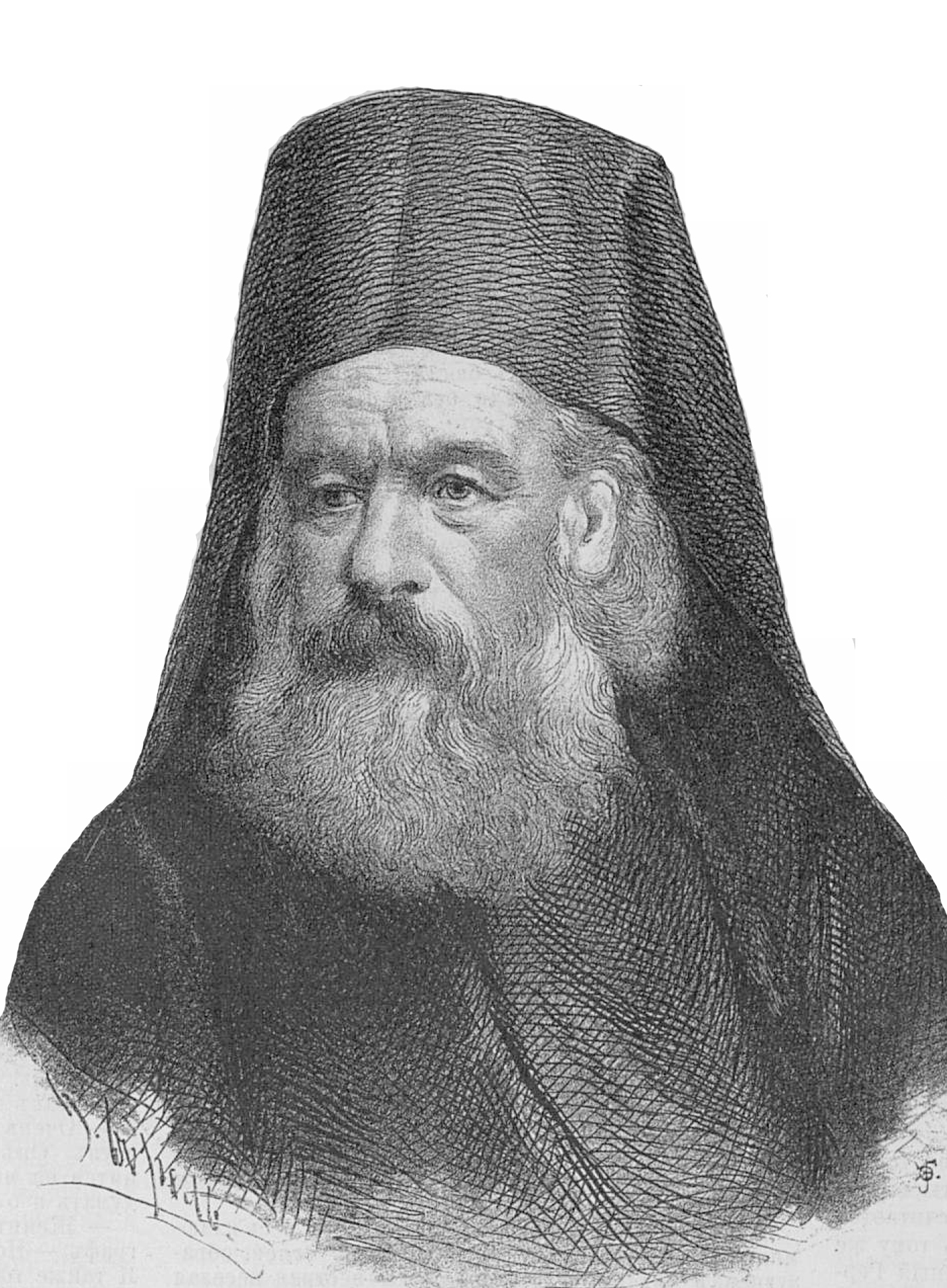
- Church: Church of Constantinople
- In office: 4 February 1887 – 25 August 1891
- Predecessor: Joachim IV of Constantinople
- Successor: Neophytus VIII of Constantinople
- Other post: Bishop of Didymoteicho

Personal details
- Born: 22 March 1820
- Died: 25 August 1891 (aged 71)
- Denomination: Eastern Orthodoxy

Dionysius V of Constantinople (Greek: Διονύσιος), born Dionysius Charitonides (Greek: Διονύσιος Χαριτωνίδης; 22 March 1820 – 25 August 1891) was Ecumenical Patriarch of Constantinople from 1887 until his death in 1891. Before becoming patriarch, he was the Metropolitan of Didymoteicho from 16 November 1868 to 1 May 1873.

== Notes and references ==
Eastern Orthodox Church titles
Preceded by Joachim IV	Ecumenical Patriarch of Constantinople; 1887 – 1891	Succeeded by Neophytus VIII
