= Eugenios Eugenidis =

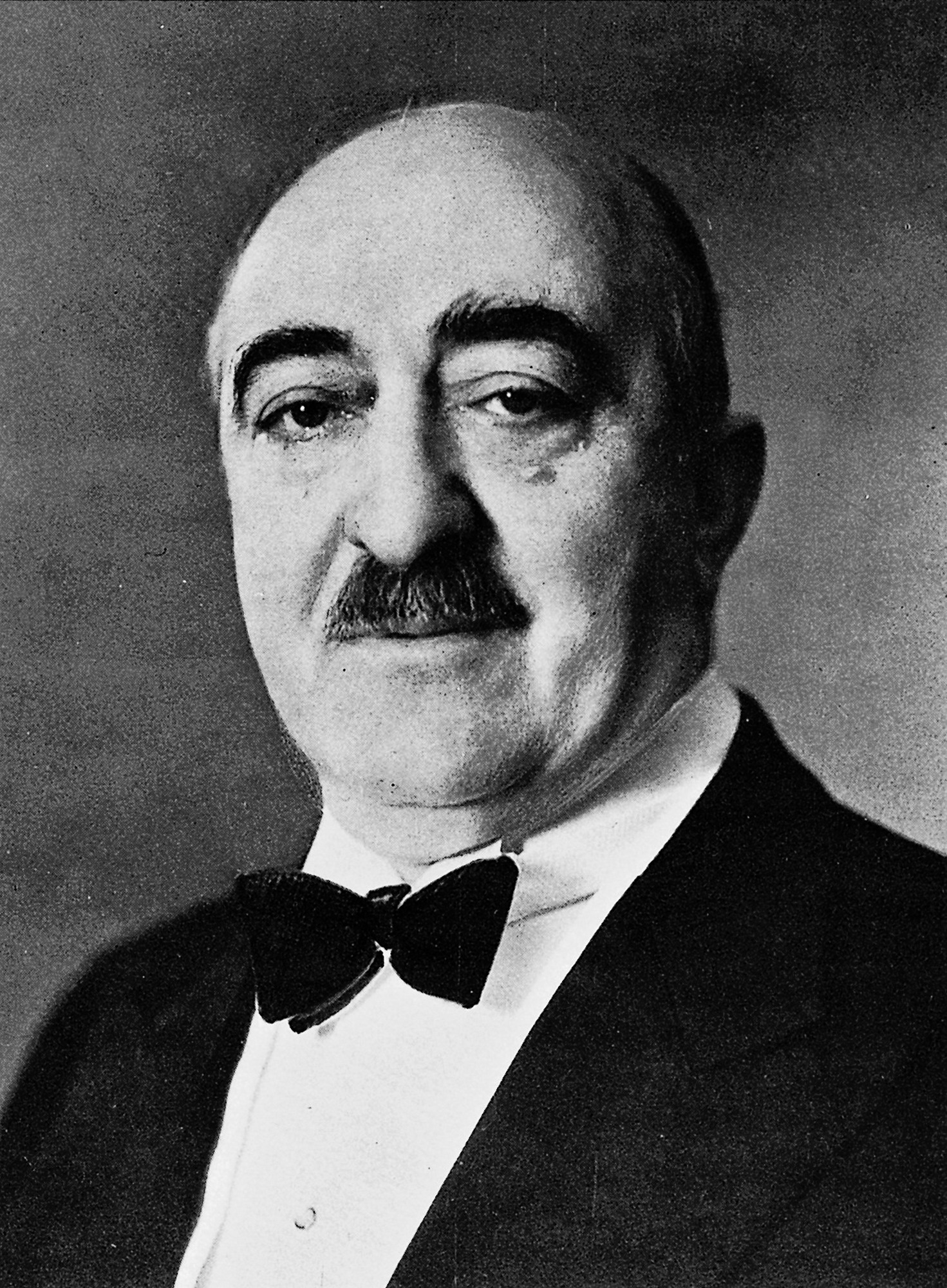
Eugenios Eugenidis (1882-1954).

Eugenios Eugenidis (Greek: Ευγένιος Ευγενίδης; December 1882 – April 1954) was a prominent Greek shipping magnate.

== Early life ==
Eugenios Eugenidis was born in Didymoteicho, Evros (then part of the Ottoman Empire) on 22 December 1882, the son of Agapios Eugenidis, a senior judge in the Ottoman Empire, and of Charikleia Afentaki. He studied at the prestigious Robert College, the most selective independent private high school in Constantinople, which he graduated at the age of twenty. By that time Eugenidis had already envisioned the possibility of going to Greece and building large shipyards, on a par with the best in the world.

== Business and success ==
Shortly after his graduation, he secured for himself a position with a large British shipping house Doro's Brothers and in 1904, aged 24, he became the general manager of the commercial shipping agency Reppen and only a little later an associate of the agency, focusing on lumber trading and his cooperation with the Swedish shipping company Broström Conzern. During that time he created his own shipyard in the Golden Horn bay. In 1923, after the Asia Minor disaster, he moved to Greece where he established the Scandinavian Near East Agency in correspondence with the Svenska Orient Linien general shipping agency, which he had founded in 1907. Through his relation with the Scandinavian and Baltic States due to lumber trading, Eugenidis also became an international intermediate for the development of Greece's foreign relations with those countries. As a result, in 1926 he was appointed consul-general of Finland in Greece. In 1937 he acquired the first ship fully owned by him named HS Argo. Between 1929 and 1939 he was appointed as president of several shipping companies, of both Greek and foreign investors.

Not long after World War II had broken out, Eugenidis had to move to Egypt where he set up a line providing regular connections between North Africa and South America by steamship. Finally, he went to Argentina and it is in the course of his stay there that he planned his post-war activities. He foresaw that a strong flow of immigration from the devastated countries of Europe was very likely to occur, and turned to ocean liners. He established Home Line, based in Genoa, and managed four ocean liners that carried immigrants from Europe to Africa, Australia, the United States and Canada.

Two years after the end of the war, in 1947, Eugenidis settled down in Vevey, Switzerland, and from there he ran his operations, which by that time had extended across the world. In 1953, his interest turned again to Greece: he set up an ocean liner connection with North America and a regular freight line to South America while continuing with the development of the innovative activities of the Scandinavian Near East Agency.

In 1953 after a magnitude 7.2 earthquake totally devastated most of the Ionian Islands, he offered substantial sums of money to families who suffered the most damage, as well as acting as an intermediate for the humanitarian aid offered to Greece by the Scandinavian countries, in response to one of Greece's worst natural disaster in centuries. The village of Evgeniko in Thrace was also renamed in his honor, after he provided for its crucial water supply.

In 1954, Spyros Melas wrote of him in Estia newspaper: "He (Eugenios Eugenides) confessed to me once, when I first met him as the General Consul for Finland in his Glyfada villa, that as far back as when seated in the classrooms of Robert College, where he had been an honour student, he had been dreaming of making a fortune, not only just for himself but in order to be able to be of help to others. This he did as a true Christian and a true patriot, in silence, almost in secret. He gave in to all the requests he thought were for the public good... He would pay for publications, finance missions, grant scholarships, facilitate journeys ... there was a whole list of poor people he helped and it is from them that the payment of his monthly obligations started."

As a recognition of his services to Greece he was awarded the Grand Cross of the Order of the Phoenix.

== Death and legacy ==
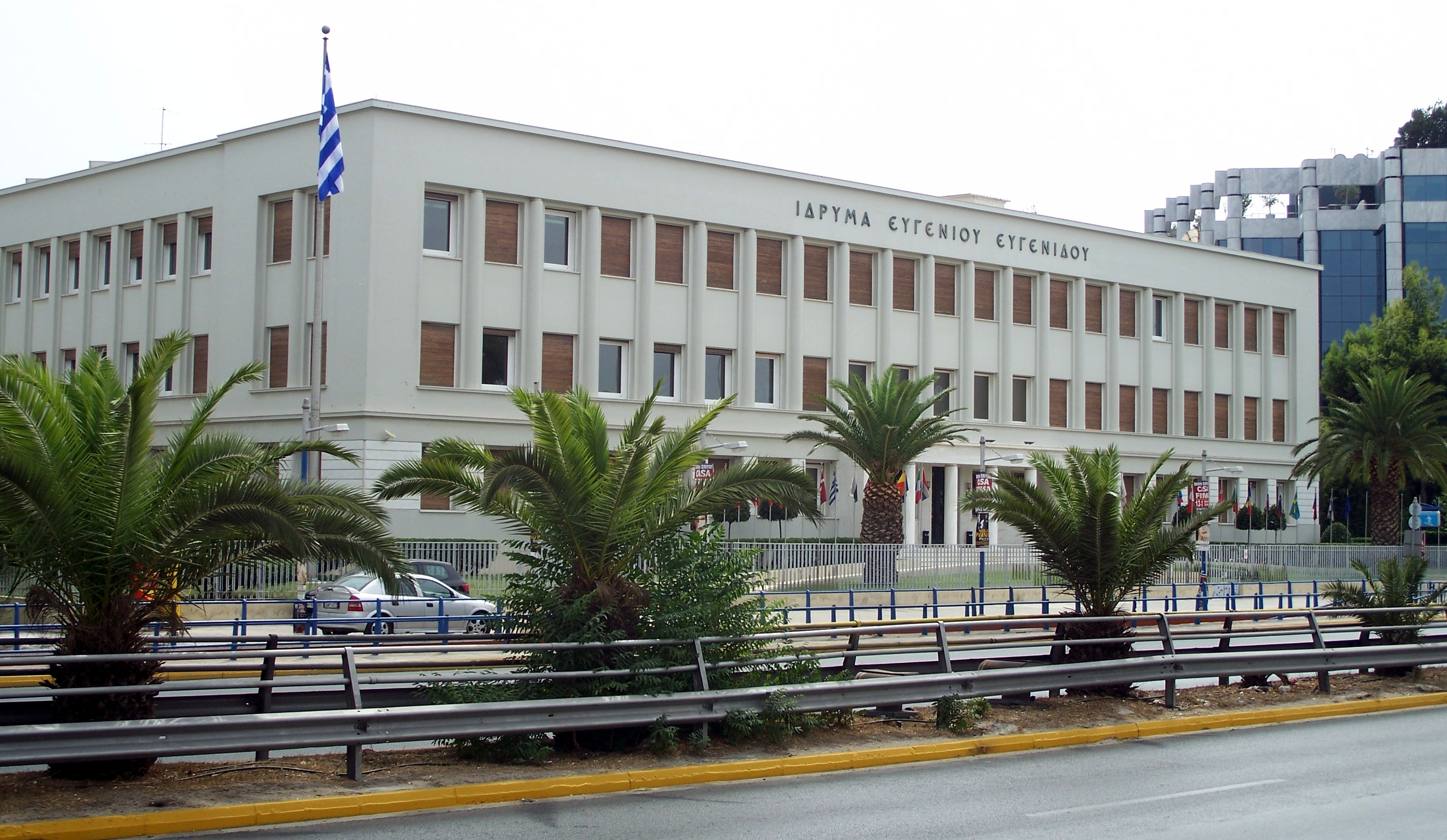
The Evgenidio Foundation in Andrea Syngrou Avenue 387, Palaio Faliro, Athens.

Eugenidis died unexpectedly in April 1954, as a businessman of international repute and in his own country a great benefactor. In his will he requested the establishment of a foundation which would contribute to the scientific and technological education of young people in Greece.

Συνιστώ εν Αθήναις κατά τούς ορισμούς του Ελληνικου Δικαίου Ίδρυμα υπό το όνομα ΙΔΡΥΜΑ ΕΥΓΕΝΙΔΟΥ, του οποίου σκοπός είναι νά συμβάλη εiς τήν εκπαίδευσιν νέων Ελληνικής ιθαγενείας εν τω επιστημονικώ καί τεχνικώ πεδίω

— Eugenios Eugenidis

Eugenides Foundation was established in 1956 in Athens, Greece. On 7 June 1965, a grand ceremony in the presence of the country's political and intellectual leadership marked the opening of the building on Syggrou Avenue that was to house it. The contemporary periodical Argo said: "Our country had long lacked a palace for education in science and technology. It has just recently acquired one. The generosity of the national patron Eugenios Eugenides has made amends for the powerlessness of our national financial want".

Eugenidis' shipping company, the Scandinavian Near East Agency, remains in business, as part of the Evge Group, a group of companies that have been developed by the heirs of Eugenidis, and offers a diverse range of services in shipping, freight forwarding and logistical support.
