= Eugenides Foundation =

Greek educational foundation

- Ίδρυμα Ευγενίδου
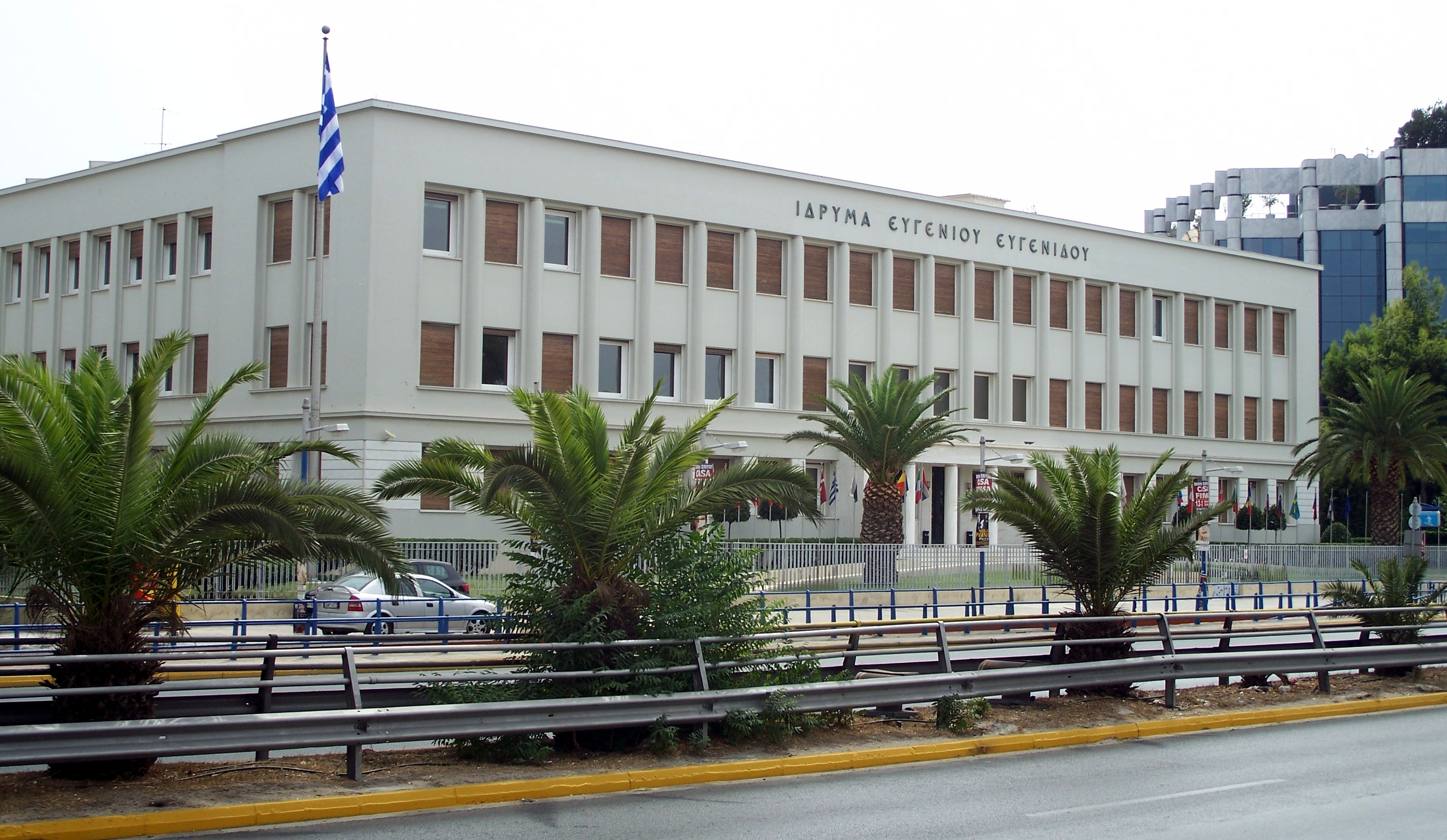
- Named after: Eugenios Eugenidis
- Formation: 1956
- Founder: Eugenios Eugenidis
- Purpose: education and science communication
- Headquarters: Andrea Syngrou Avenue, Palaio Faliro, Athens
- Location: Athens, Greece
- Coordinates: 37.5624°N 23.4147°E
- Website: https://www.eef.edu.gr/en

The Eugenides Foundation (Greek: Ίδρυμα Ευγενίδου) is a Greek private educational foundation. It was established in 1956 in Athens, Greece implementing the will of the late Greek benefactor Eugenios Eugenidis, who died in April 1954.

The activity of the foundation, in accordance with its articles of association, is to contribute to the scientific and technological education of young people in Greece. The foundation is administered by a committee of three persons, which is participated by each professor which is elected as a rector of the National Technical University of Athens (NTUA) until the end of his term as a rector. For its multifaceted contribution to Greek society, Eugenides Foundation was honored in December 1965 with the gold medal of the Academy of Athens.

== Activities ==
The activities and establishments of the Foundation include:

- a scholarship program granting 20 scholarships annually
- a scientific and technical library,
- a museum of science and technology,
- publishing of scientific and technical books, with over 45.000.000 copies of books published to date,
- a digital computerized planetarium, of dome diameter 25 m and a total surface of 950 m2, one of the best equipped in the world.
- lecture halls and auditoriums.

== Gallery ==
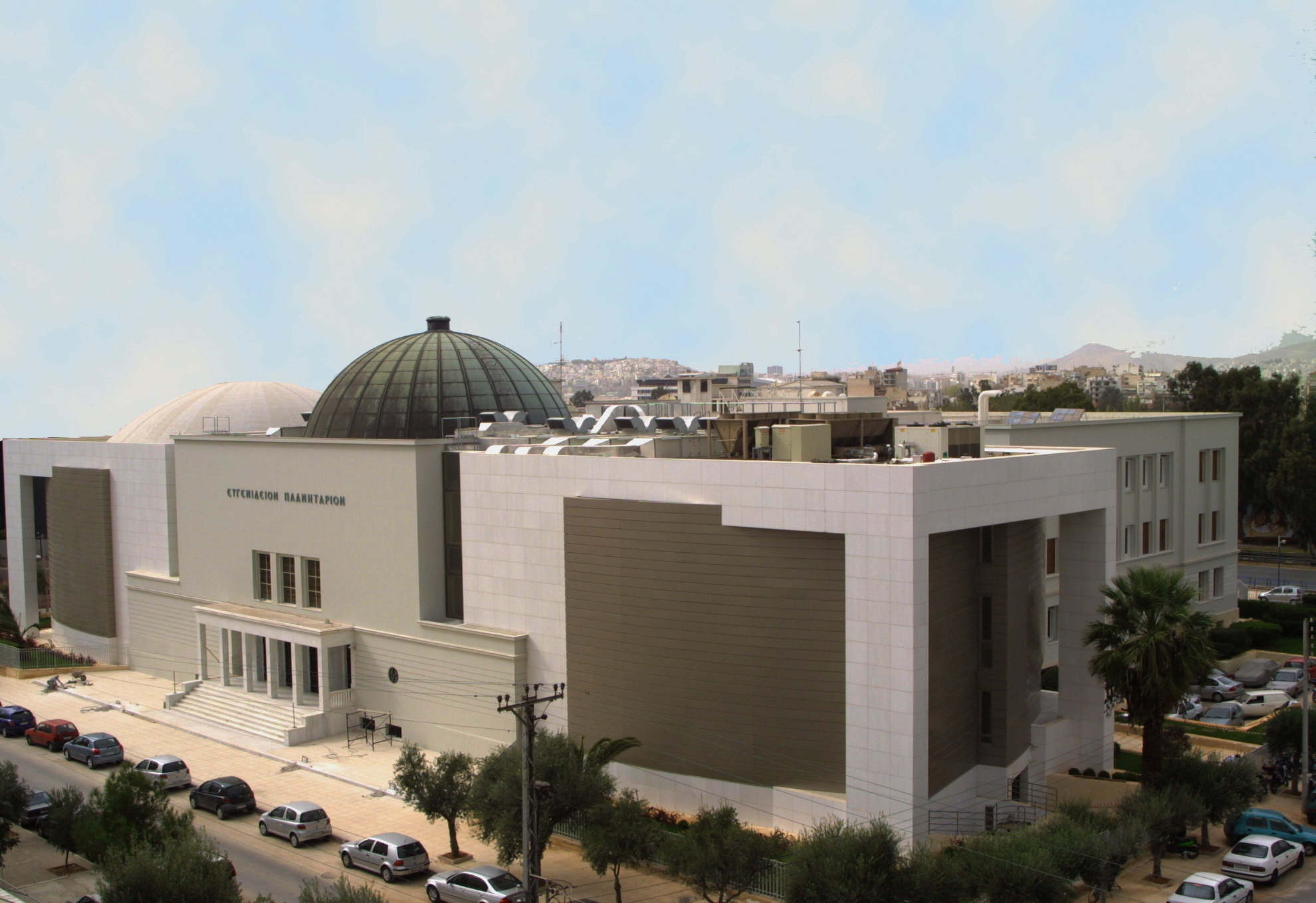
Eugenides Planetarium building

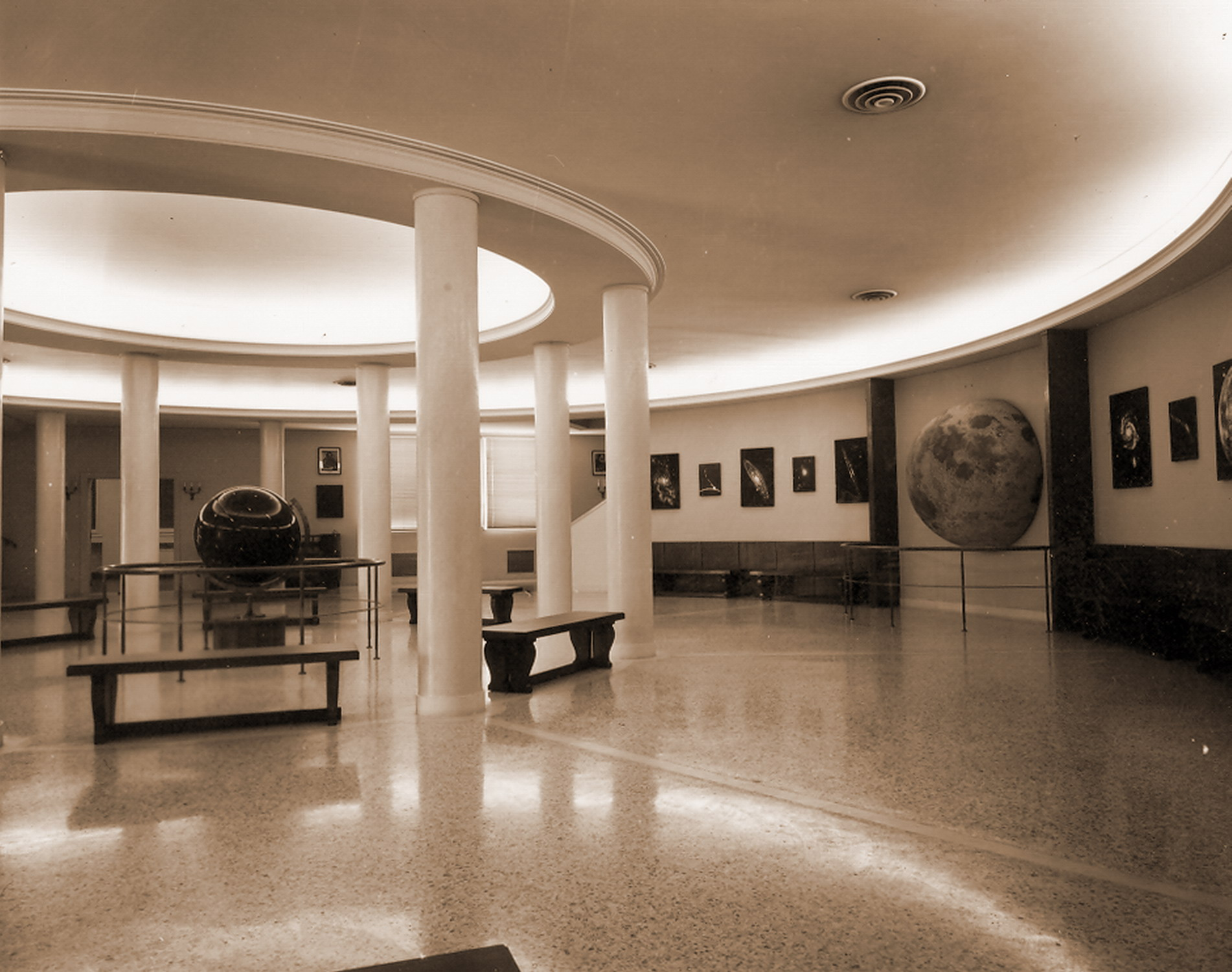
Exhibition space

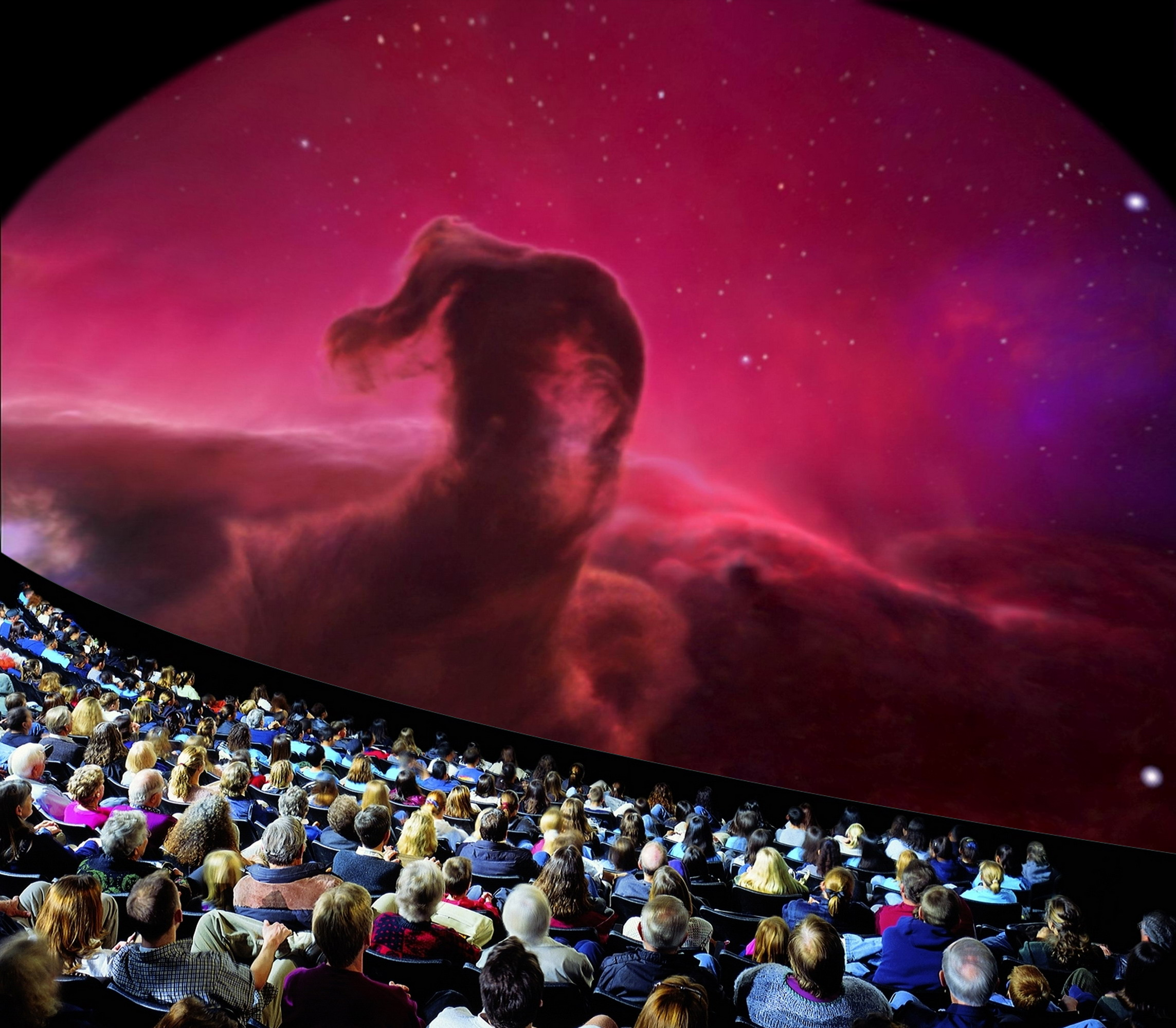
Interior of the Eugenides Planetarium

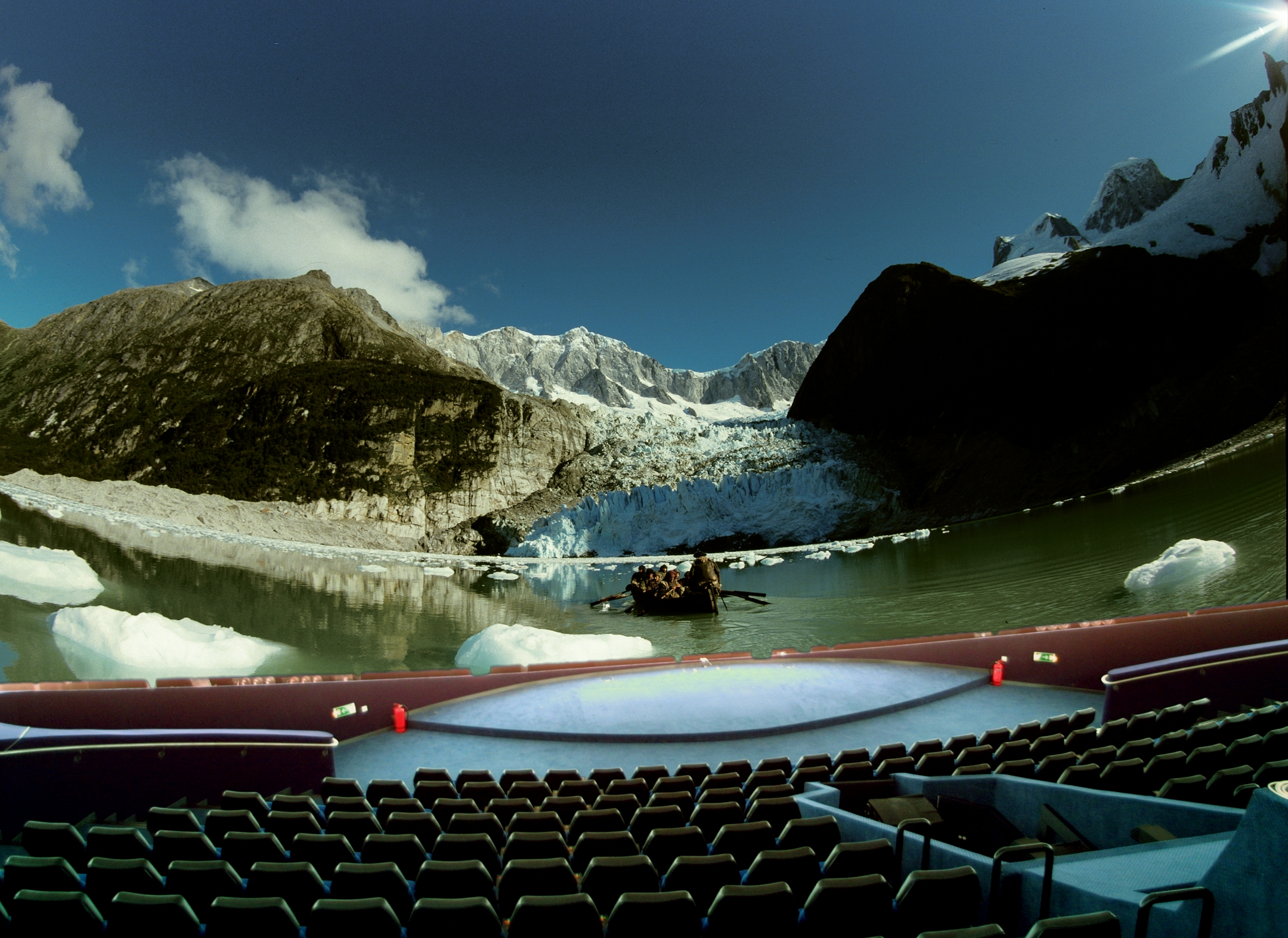
Interior of the Eugenides Planetarium
