= Lordship of Demotika =

Crusader state in existence 1204–1205

Coordinates: 41.3488°N 26.4933°E

The Lordship of Demotika was a short-lived Crusader state in 1204–05, founded after the Fourth Crusade in the conquered Byzantine lands of Thrace around Demotika (Didymoteicho).

== History ==
Immediately after the fall of Constantinople to the Crusade in April 1204, quarrels began between the Crusaders over the division of the spoils. The town of Demotika was originally apportioned to Baldwin of Flanders, the new Latin Emperor, but was seized for a while by Boniface of Montferrat after Baldwin seized the latter's preferred territory, Thessalonica. Eventually, peace was restored and Boniface received Thessalonica, which became a kingdom, while Demotika reverted to the Latin Empire. In October 1204, following the definitive partition of the former Byzantine Empire (Partitio Romaniae), Demotika was given as a fief to Hugh IV of Saint Pol, a Picard veteran of the Third Crusade who would die soon after, in March 1205, in Constantinople.

Latin rule in Thrace was not secure, however, as it was threatened by the Bulgarian Empire in the north, and the resentment of the local Eastern Orthodox Greek population towards their new Roman Catholic masters. Thus in early 1205, the locals rose up in revolt in Demotika, Adrianople and other cities, evicted their Latin garrisons, and acknowledged the suzerainty of the Bulgarian Tsar Kalojan. Baldwin of Flanders responded by marching into Thrace and besieging Adrianople, but at the subsequent Battle of Adrianople (April 14, 1205) the Latin army suffered a crushing defeat and Baldwin was taken prisoner.

Soon, however, Kalojan began massacring the Greek inhabitants of the cities of Serres and Philippopolis, causing the Greeks to rally behind the new regent of the Latin Empire, Henry of Flanders. Thus in early 1206 the inhabitants of Demotika and Adrianople submitted to the Greek lord Theodore Branas, who was in the Latin Emperor's service. The initial Bulgarian sieges of Demotika and Adrianople failed due to the resistance of the citizenry under Branas and the arrival of a relief army under Henry, but in early autumn Kalojan succeeded in sacking Demotika. Henry, now Latin Emperor, managed to recapture the inhabitants as they were being taken prisoner to Bulgaria, but before he withdrew from Demotika, Kalojan ordered the town's fortifications razed, making it useless as a military base.

== Sources ==
- Andrea, Alfred J. (2008). "Count Hugh of Saint Pol's Report to the West". Contemporary Sources for the Fourth Crusade: Revised Edition. BRILL. pp. 177–201. ISBN 978-9004169432.
- Fine, John Van Antwerp (1994). The Late Medieval Balkans: A Critical Survey from the Late Twelfth Century to the Ottoman Conquest. University of Michigan Press. ISBN 978-0472082605.
- Wolff, Robert Lee (1969). "The Latin Empire of Constantinople, 1204–1261". In Wolff, Robert Lee; Hazard, Harry W. (eds.). A History of the Crusades, Volume II: The Later Crusades, 1189–1311. University of Wisconsin Press. pp. 187–233.
