= Mani, Evros =

Mani Μάνη
- Community
- Location within Greece
- Coordinates: 41°24′32″N 26°24′07″E
- Country: Greece
- Administrative region: Eastern Macedonia and Thrace
- Regional unit: Evros
- Municipality: Didymoteicho
- Municipal unit: Didymoteicho

Population (2021)
  - Community: 364
- Time zone: UTC+2 (EET)
  - Summer (DST): UTC+3 (EEST)

Mani (Greek: Μάνη) is a village and a community in the municipality of Didymoteicho in the Evros regional unit, Greece. It is situated near the left bank of the river Erythropotamos, 2 km west of Karoti, 4 km northeast of Kyani and 10 km northwest of Didymoteicho town centre. In 2021 its population was 364 for the community, which includes the villages Evgeniko and Sitaria. Its elevation is 55 m.

== Population ==
Year	Population	Community population
1991	-	747
2001	526	767
2011	385	538
2021	254	364

== See also ==
- List of settlements in the Evros regional unit
