= Battle of Nicopolis (disambiguation) =

The Battle of Nicopolis in 1396 resulted in the rout of an army of Hungarian, Croatian, Bulgarian, Wallachian, French, Burgundian, German, and assorted troops at the hands of an Ottoman force.

Battle of Nicopolis may also refer to:

- Battle of Nicopolis (48 BC)
- Battle of Nicopolis ad Istrum, a battle in 250 between the Romans and the Goths
- Battle of Nicopolis (1798), between the French and the Albanians of Ali Pasha of Janina
- Battle of Nikopol, an 1877 battle of the Russo-Turkish War
- Battle of Nicopolis (1912)
