= Isaakio =

Isaakio Ισαάκιο
- Community
- Location within Greece
- Coordinates: 41°21′47″N 26°32′20″E
- Country: Greece
- Administrative region: Eastern Macedonia and Thrace
- Regional unit: Evros
- Municipality: Didymoteicho
- Municipal unit: Didymoteicho

Population (2021)
  - Community: 316
- Time zone: UTC+2 (EET)
  - Summer (DST): UTC+3 (EEST)

Isaakio (Greek: Ισαάκιο) is a village of Evros regional unit in Greece, part of the municipality Didymoteicho. It is located 5 km (3.1 mi) east of Didymoteicho. Its population according to the 2021 census was 316.

== See also ==
- List of settlements in the Evros regional unit
