= Sitochori, Evros =

Sitochori Σιτοχώρι
- Community
- Location within Greece
- Coordinates: 41°27′43″N 26°21′27″E
- Country: Greece
- Administrative region: East Macedonia and Thrace
- Regional unit: Evros
- Municipality: Didymoteicho
- Municipal unit: Didymoteicho

Population (2021)
  - Community: 242
- Time zone: UTC+2 (EET)
  - Summer (DST): UTC+3 (EEST)

Sitochori (Greek: Σιτοχώρι) is a village in the northern part of the Evros regional unit, Greece. It is part of the municipality of Didymoteicho. Sitochori is about 20 km northwest of central Didymoteicho, and north of the river Erythropotamos.

== Population ==
Year	Population
1981	439
1991	406
2001	440
2011	326
2021	242

== History ==
Before 1913 Sitochori was under Ottoman Turkish control. The name of the village under Turkish control was Казълджикьой. There were 150 Bulgarian (Hane) houses in the village. After a brief period of Bulgarian rule between 1913 and 1919, it became part of Greece. The village changed its name to Skourtochori (Σκουρτοχώρι) in 1923 and then it was renamed to its current name, Sitochori, in 1954.

== See also ==
- List of settlements in the Evros regional unit
