= Didymoteicho =

Town in Greece

Didymoteicho Διδυμότειχο
- Municipality
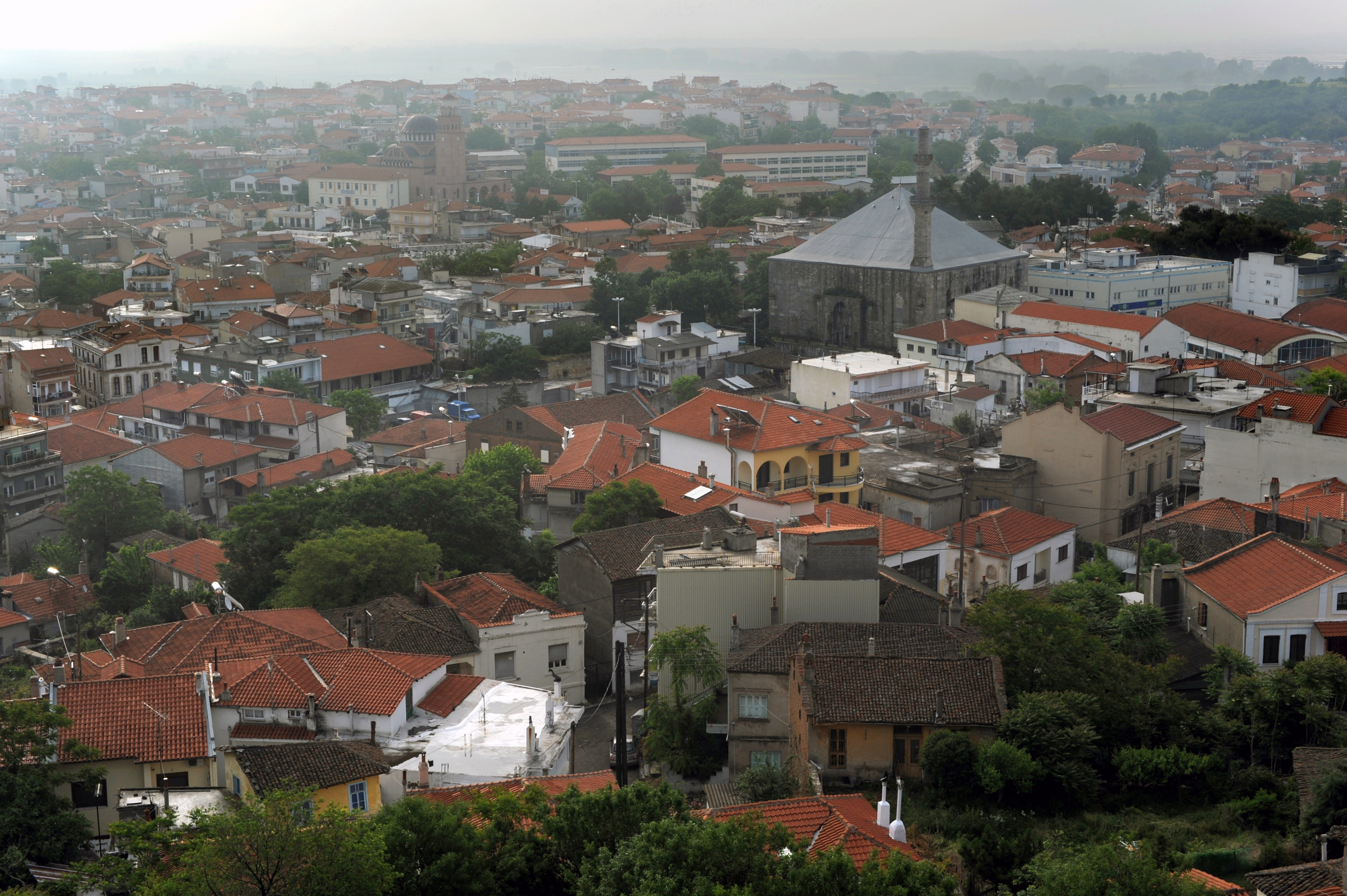
- Panoramic view of Didymoteicho from the walls of the fortress May 2010. The structure with the pyramidal roof is the Çelebi Sultan Mehmed Mosque.

- Location within Greece
- Coordinates: 41°21′N 26°30′E
- Country: Greece
- Geographic region: Thrace
- Administrative region: Eastern Macedonia and Thrace
- Regional unit: Evros

Government
  - Mayor: Romylos Chatzigiannoglou (since 2019)

Area
  - Municipality: 565.4 km^{2} (218.3 sq mi)
  - Municipal unit: 354.1 km^{2} (136.7 sq mi)
- Elevation: 31 m (102 ft)

Population (2021)
  - Municipality: 16,060
  - Density: 28.40/km^{2} (73.57/sq mi)
  - Municipal unit: 13,673
  - Municipal unit density: 38.61/km^{2} (100.0/sq mi)
  - Community: 8,681
- Time zone: UTC+2 (EET)
  - Summer (DST): UTC+3 (EEST)
- Postal code: 683 00
- Area code: 25530
- Vehicle registration: OP
- Website: www.didymoteicho.gr

Didymoteicho (Greek: Διδυμότειχο, romanized: Didymóteicho IPA: [ðiðiˈmotixo]) is a town located on the eastern edge of the Evros regional unit of Eastern Macedonia and Thrace, in northeastern Greece. It is the seat of the municipality of the same name. The town (pop. 8,681 in 2021) sits on a plain and located south east of Svilengrad, south of Edirne, Turkey and Orestiada, west of Uzunköprü, Turkey, about 20 km north of Soufli and about 90 km north of Alexandroupoli. The municipality of Didymóteicho has a land area of 565.4 km^{2} and a population of 16,060 inhabitants.

== Etymology ==
"Didymoteicho" is the modern Greek form of Διδυμότειχον, Didymóteichon, from δίδυμος, dídymos, "twin" and τεῖχος, teîchos, "wall". The name first appears in 591/592, and most likely resulted from the refortification of the city under Justinian I (see below).

The corrupted short form Dimotica or Demotica or variants thereof are attested in Western languages since the late 12th century (early forms Timoticon, Dimothicon, Dimodica), and remained in use for the city until the 20th century. The city was called ديمتوقه in Ottoman Turkish and is still called Dimetoka in Turkish, which was its name during the rule of the Ottoman Empire, and Dimotika (from Bulgarian Димотика) by the Pomaks of the region.

== Geography ==
Forests dominate the banks and parts of the plain. Much of the area is used for farming. The main products are cattle, fruit and vegetables and some flowers. The hills dominate further west. Near the area lies the great forest of Dadia. Didymoteicho is located around 12 km from Turkey and the western banks of the Evros. It is the easternmost municipality on the mainland of Greece (in its town of Pythio). In the west, much of the land is mountainous and forested, while farmlands are located in the central and the northern part. It is on the railway line Thessaloniki–Istanbul and the Greek road 51 (Alexandroupoli–Orestiada–Edirne in Turkey and Svilengrad in Bulgaria).

=== Climate ===
Didymoteicho has a hot-summer Mediterranean climate (Csa) with hot, mostly dry summers and cool, wet winters.

Climate data for Didymoteicho
Month	Jan	Feb	Mar	Apr	May	Jun	Jul	Aug	Sep	Oct	Nov	Dec	Year
Mean daily maximum °C (°F)	8 (46)	9 (48)	13 (55)	18 (64)	23 (73)	28 (82)	31 (88)	31 (88)	27 (81)	20 (68)	14 (57)	9 (48)	19 (67)
Mean daily minimum °C (°F)	−1 (30)	0 (32)	3 (37)	7 (45)	12 (54)	16 (61)	19 (66)	19 (66)	15 (59)	10 (50)	6 (43)	1 (34)	9 (48)
Average precipitation mm (inches)	73 (2.9)	57 (2.2)	65 (2.6)	55 (2.2)	43 (1.7)	31 (1.2)	20 (0.8)	10 (0.4)	20 (0.8)	60 (2.4)	70 (2.8)	73 (2.9)	577 (22.9)
Source: Apple Weather

== Municipality ==
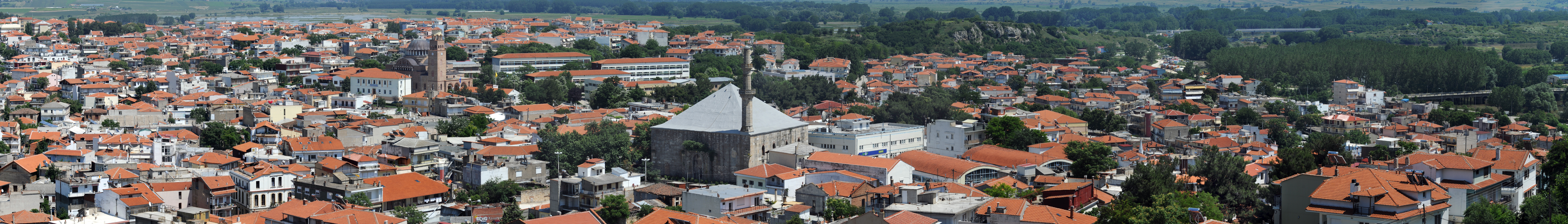
Panoramic view of the town from the fortress walls, photographed in June 2012.

The municipality Didymoteicho was formed at the 2011 local government reform by the merger of the following 2 former municipalities, that became municipal units:

- Didymoteicho
- Metaxades

The municipality has an area of 565.372 km^{2}, the municipal unit 354.134 km^{2}.

=== Communities ===
The municipal unit Didymoteicho is subdivided into the following communities (constituent settlements in brackets):

- Didymoteicho (Didymoteicho, Zoodochos Pigi, Neoi Psathades)
- Asvestades
- Asimenio
- Ellinochori (Ellinochori, Thyrea, Lagos)
- Isaakio
- Karoti
- Koufovouno
- Kyani
- Lagos
- Mani (Mani, Evgeniko, Sitaria)
- Petrades
- Poimeniko
- Prangio
- Pythio (Pythio, Rigio, Stathmos)
- Rigio
- Sitochori
- Sofiko

The largest settlements, other than Didymoteicho itself, are Sofikó (pop. 795), Metaxades (687), Koufóvouno (629), Lagós (620) and Ellinochóri (593).

== Province ==
The province of Didymoteicho (Greek: Επαρχία Διδυμοτείχου) was one of the provinces of the Evros Prefecture. Its territory corresponded with that of the current municipality Didymoteicho and the municipal unit Orfeas. It was abolished in 2006.

== History ==
=== Antiquity ===
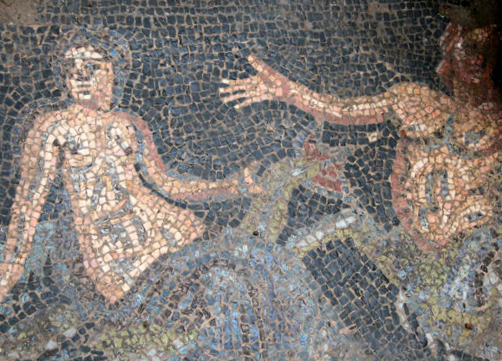
Roman mosaics from Plotinopolis

The area around the town was inhabited in Neolithic times. It was later an important Thracian and Hellenistic town, sacked by the Romans in 204 BC. In the early 2nd century, the Roman emperor Trajan created a new city on the banks of the Evros river, between two surrounding hills, near modern Turkish Uzunköprü, and named it Plotinopolis after his wife Pompeia Plotina. The ruins of the ancient city are now known as the Kale, after the Turkish for "castle". A solid gold bust of Emperor Septimius Severus found on the site of Plotinopolis in 1965 is now in the museum at Komotini.

The city was built in a strategic position, adjoining a fertile plain for agricultural exploitation and also controlling the passage of Erythropotamos, through which passed a branch of the Via Egnatia leading through the middle and upper valley of Evros River to the shores of the Black Sea.

The city would later become one of the most important towns in Thrace, having its own assembly, and an episcopal see (suffragan of Adrianople).

The first bishop of the city, Hierophilus, is mentioned in the 430s.

=== Medieval era ===
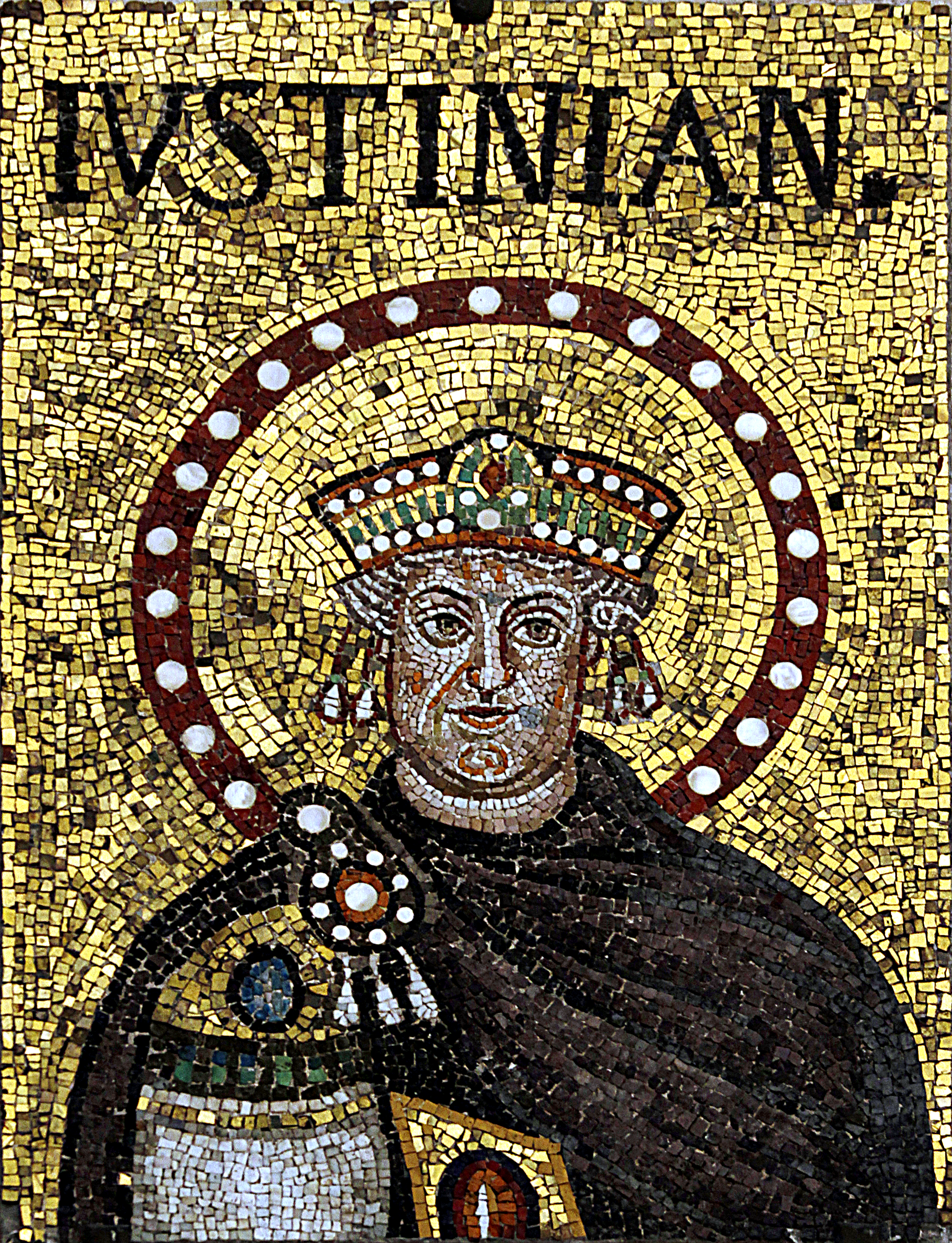
Emperor Justinian I's refortification of Plotinopolis marks the beginning of the modern settlement of Didymoteicho and gave the city its name

According to Procopius of Caesarea, Emperor Justinian I (r. 527–565) improved the fortifications of Plotinopolis. It was probably at that time that the nearby higher, rocky and hence more defensible hill was also fortified. The name "Didymoteichon" ("twin fortification") appears in 591/592, and probably referred to this double fortified settlement. Given the exposed lowland location of Plotinopolis, the site was soon abandoned in favour of the more recent fortress, a process that was possibly completed already in the 7th century. The name "Plotinopolis" survived for the episcopal see until the 9th century, before it too was replaced.

In summer 813, during his invasion of Thrace, the Bulgarian ruler Krum captured the town, but in 879 it was a bishopric whose incumbent, Nikephoros, participated in the Ninth Council of Constantinople. A 9th-century seal attests to the presence of a kommerkiarios in the city. A century later, the town served as a place of exile for the general and rebel Bardas Skleros, who unsuccessfully tried to oust Byzantine Emperor Basil II. Bardas and his brother Constantine died there in March 991.

In winter 1100/01, Alexios I Komnenos allowed the Lombards of the Crusade of 1101 to resupply at the city. During the 12th century, members of the Petraliphas family are known to have lived in the city. On 24 November 1189, the city was captured and largely destroyed by the forces of the Third Crusade under Frederick VI, Duke of Swabia, who had captured Adrianople two days before. In the 1198 chrysobull granted to the Republic of Venice, Didymoteicho and Adrianople are mentioned as forming a single province. In 1205, French writer Geoffroi de Villehardouin wrote of the important of the city, referring to Didymoteicho “was the most powerful and one of the richest Romanic cities”.

Following the fall of Constantinople to the Fourth Crusade in April 1204, the new Latin Emperor, Baldwin of Flanders, garrisoned the city in summer, but it was soon after surrendered by a local Greek to Baldwin's rival, Boniface of Montferrat, who held it in ransom until his claims against Baldwin were satisfied. In the Partitio Romaniae the city belonged to the portion accorded to the individual Crusaders. The city was finally given as a fief to Hugh IV of Saint Pol.

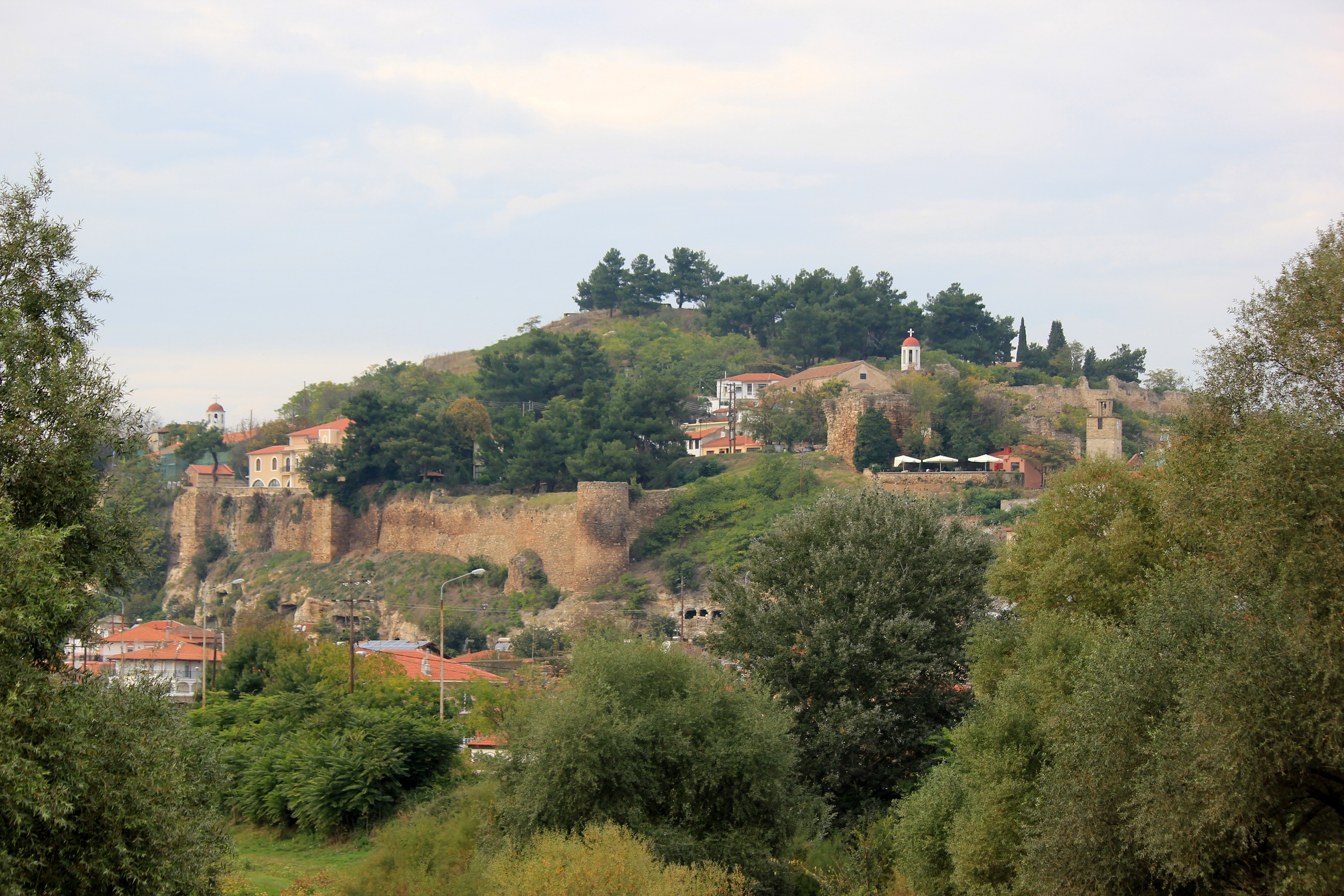
The castle hill

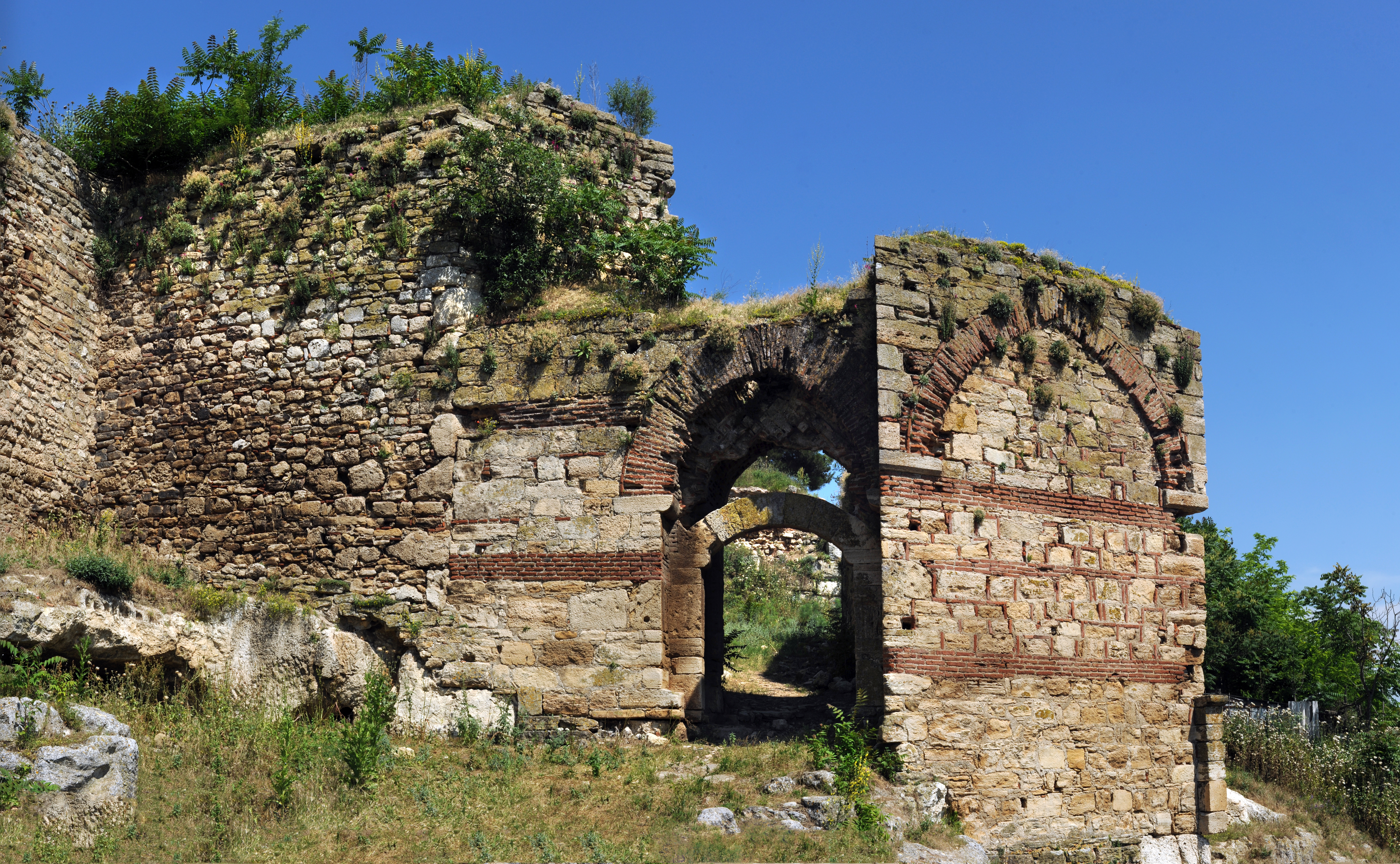
The Kallioporta Gate in the Byzantine citadel of Didymoteicho

In February 1205, however, the locals rose up in revolt in Didymoteicho, Adrianople and other cities, evicted their Latin garrisons, and acknowledged the suzerainty of the Bulgarian Tsar Kalojan. Baldwin of Flanders responded by marching into Thrace and besieging Adrianople, but at the subsequent Battle of Adrianople (14 April 1205) the Latin army suffered a crushing defeat and Baldwin was taken prisoner. The city, effectively autonomous, served as a place of refuge for the local population fleeing the depredations of Kalojan following his victory. A Latin siege of the city was broken up in September 1205 due to a flood of the Evros (or the Erythropotamos), but after Kalojan's massacres of the inhabitants of the cities of Serres and Philippopolis, the Thracian cities turned to the new regent of the Latin Empire, Henry of Flanders (r. 1205–1216). Thus in early 1206 Didymoteicho and Adrianople submitted to the Greek lord Theodore Branas, who was in the Latin Emperor's service. Kalojan besieged Didymoteicho in early summer, and was on the point of taking the city when a relief army under Henry arrived. Before Branas had time to repair the fortifications, however, in early autumn, Kalojan returned and sacked the city. Henry of Flanders managed to rescue the inhabitants as they were being taken prisoner to Bulgaria, but before he withdrew from the city, Kalojan ordered the town's fortifications razed, making it useless as a military base.

In 1225, the city was captured by the ambitious Greek ruler of Epirus and Thessalonica, Theodore Komnenos Doukas, but after his defeat and capture at the Battle of Klokotnitsa in 1230 it fell to Ivan Asen II of Bulgaria. As such, Dimotiko is mentioned in a grant of trading privileges issued by Ivan Asen to the Republic of Ragusa.

Finally the Empire of Nicaea returned Didymoteicho to Byzantine control by capturing it around 1243, during the reign of John III Doukas Vatatzes. In 1255/56, Theodore II Laskaris used the city as a base of operations for his campaigns against Bulgaria. The city was once again the centre of military operations in 1306, when Michael IX Palaiologos campaigned against the Catalan Company, and again during the Byzantine civil war of 1321–1328 between Andronikos II Palaiologos (r. 1282–1328) and his grandson, Andronikos III (r. 1328–1341). The latter made Didymoteicho his main base and residence during the conflict, and the city remained a stronghold and was frequently visited by Andronikos III during his reign. The city also served as a secure place of exile and incarceration of the emperor's opponents, from his uncle Constantine Palaiologos in 1322 to the disgraced chief minister Theodore Metochites in 1328.

During the Byzantine civil war of 1341–47, it served as the base of Andronikos III's chief lieutenant, John VI Kantakouzenos (r. 1347–1354), who was crowned emperor in the city on 26 October 1341. Pressed by his enemies, Kantakouzenos was forced to abandon the city in March 1342, leaving his wife and a few close relatives in charge. With the aid of Umur Bey, ruler of the Turkish beylik of Aydin and owner of a considerable fleet, repeated attempts by the Bulgarian Tsar Ivan Alexander and Kantakouzenos' Byzantine opponents, headed by Alexios Apokaukos, were defeated, and the city remained in his hands throughout the conflict, serving as his main stronghold in Thrace. After the war, the city became part of the Thracian appanage of Matthew Kantakouzenos, who provided it with strong fortifications. In 1352, it was assigned to John V Palaiologos (r. 1341–1391), but he quickly clashed with Matthew Kantakouzenos, and only after another round of warfare in 1352–57 did the city finally come into Palaiologan hands. The Battle of Demotika, the Ottomans' first victory in Europe, was fought before the city in 1352 during the civil war.

The city was the birthplace of emperors John III Doukas Vatatzes (born c. 1193) and John V Palaiologos (born 18 June 1332).

=== Ottoman era ===
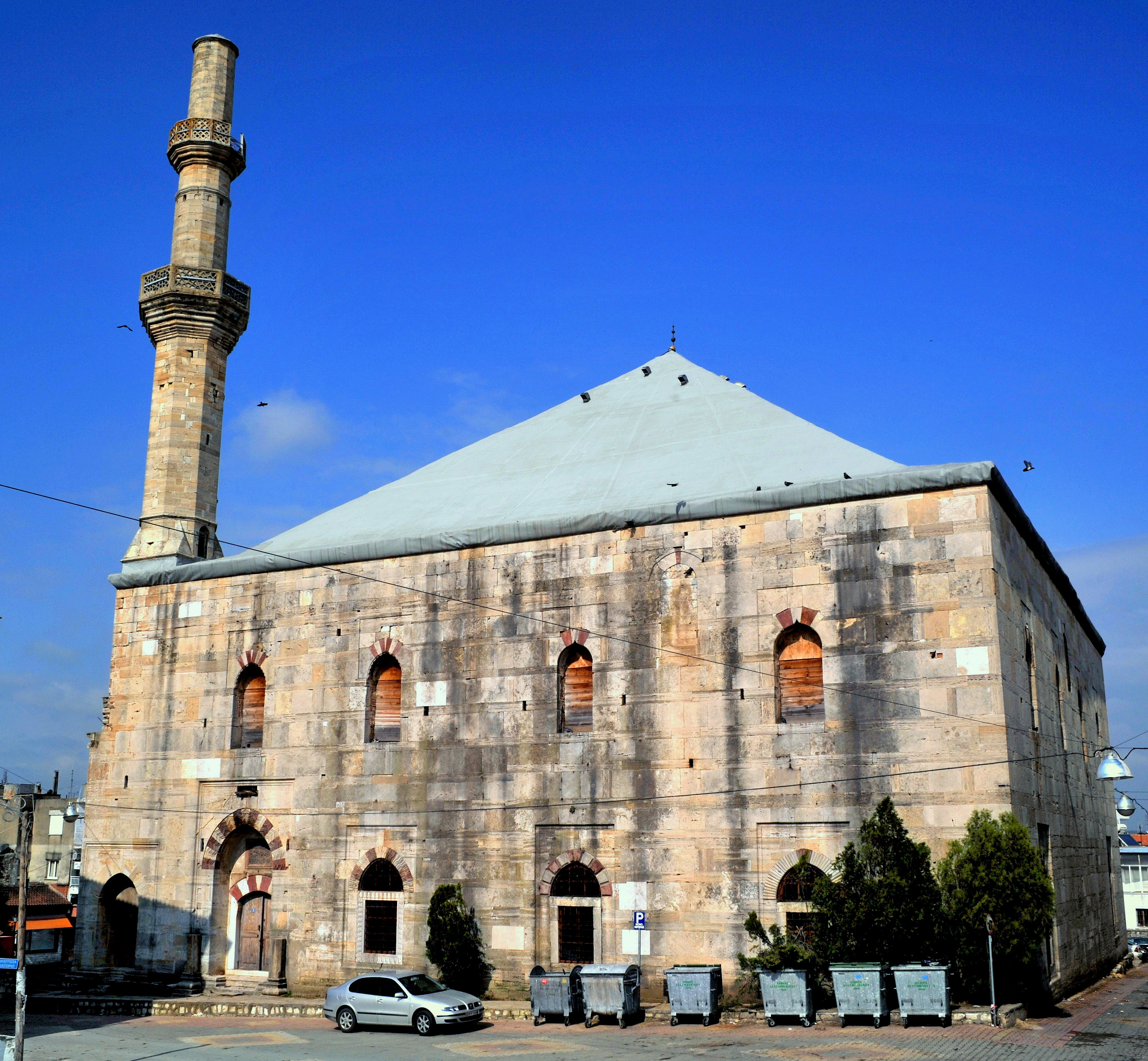
The Çelebi Sultan Mehmed or Bayezid Mosque

The city—known as Dimetoka or Demotika under Ottoman rule—was captured by the Ottomans in 1359 and again, this time permanently (probably by the commander Hadji Ilbeg), in 1361. Reportedly, the Serbian ruler Jovan Uglješa besieged the city sometime after. In 1373, following a failed joint revolt against their fathers, the Ottoman prince Savcı Bey and the Byzantine prince Andronikos IV Palaiologos fled to the city, which was then conquered by Savcı's father, Murad I (r. 1362–1389). Murad made the city his residence, at least until 1377.

It nevertheless remained a "favourite resort of early Ottoman rulers" due to its rich hunting grounds even after the capital moved to Adrianople and Constantinople. As such the city was rebuilt, with the Byzantine walls repaired and a royal palace constructed, and beautified, an effect still evident in 1443, when the French traveller Bertrandon de la Broquiere visited it. Sultan Bayezid II (r. 1481–1512) was born there and was on his way there to retire after abdicating in favour of his son, Selim I (r. 1512–1520), when he died (probably of poison).

The Ottoman traveller Evliya Çelebi visited the town in 1670. The town was the seat of a kadi and administrative centre of the local district (nahiye). Evliya also provides a description of the fortress. The upper fortress, where the disused royal palace was located, measured some 2,500 paces in circumference, with double stone walls and "a hundred" towers; the sole Muslim living there was the commander, the rest of it, some 100 households, being inhabited solely by non-Muslims. The citadel within it (Iç Kale) was arranged on two levels, one of which was known as the "Maiden's Castle" (Kız Kalesı). The outer town (Varoş) counted 600 multi-storey houses and was divided into 12 wards (mahalle). There were several mosques and mesjits, of which the Bayezid Mosque was the most important, as well as four madrasahs, one of which was established by Sultan Bayezid I. From Evliya's references, the area of Didymoteicho appears to have been a major centre of the Bektashi dervishes. Of the local hamams, the most notable was the so-called "Whisper Bath" (fısıltı hamamı), with its "Ear of Dionysus"; it survived at least until the 1890s. The town had a marketplace but no bezesten; its chief produce were grapes and quinces, but also local pottery and glassware, which had a great reputation.

Swedish king Charles XII stayed in the town from February 1713 to October 1714 after his flight from the Battle of Poltava, but otherwise the town became an unimportant provincial backwater in early modern times.

=== Modern era ===
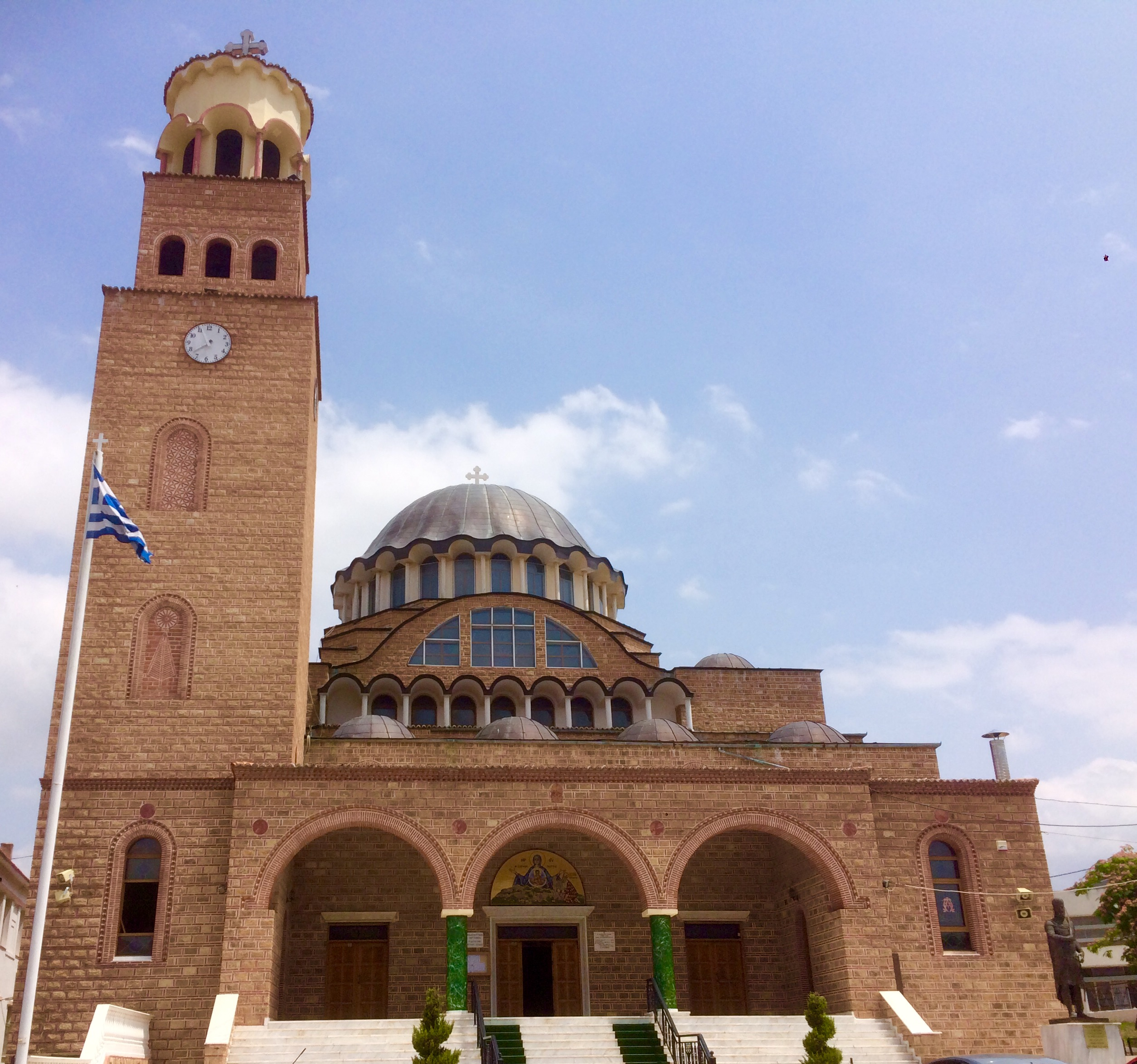
Panagia Eleftherotria church

In 1912 the town was briefly occupied by the Bulgarians during the First Balkan War, only to return to Ottoman control in the Second Balkan War. The Ottoman Government offered the city to Bulgaria in 1915, as a reward for entering World War I on the side of the Central Powers. Under the terms of the 1919 Treaty of Neuilly, Didymoteicho, along with the rest of Western Thrace, came under the temporary management of a multinational Entente military force led by the French General Charles Antoine Charpy. In the second half of April 1920, as a result of the San Remo conference of the leaders of the main allies of the Entente powers (except the United States), the region of Western Thrace was annexed by Greece. The Second World War devastated Didymoteicho. In May 1943, 731 Jews from the city were deported to Auschwitz concentration camp.

Modern Didymoteicho is home to numerous descendants of Greek refugees from Eastern Thrace, now in Turkey, as well as members of Greece's Turkish-speaking Muslim minority (Turks of Western Thrace). Like the Pomaks of East Macedonia and Thrace, the Turkish population of Didymoteicho dates to the Ottoman period and, unlike the Turkish Muslims and Greek Muslims of Macedonia and Epirus, was exempted from the 1923 Greek-Turkish population exchange following the Treaty of Lausanne.

The town was considerably affected by the Evros river flooding of 17 to 22 February 2005. Flood warnings were reported at that time. The flood affected much of the town on Wednesday, 2 March 2005 and continued for several days. On Friday, 4 March, flood waters began to ebb slowly. Over 5,000 mm of rainfall caused the river to overflow its banks. Buildings, properties and stores were flooded, leaving people stranded. It was the worst flood in nearly 50 years. The railway line south of Didymoteicho and near the station was also flooded and was closed. Serious flooding was also experienced in March 2006 and November 2014, while in the Evros floods of 2021 the largest floods took place throughout the city and the general Evros and Erythropotamos river areas.

Didymoteicho is just 2 kilometers away from the Greek-Turkish border, and as a result it is home to many Greek military units and Hellenic Army training centers. Hundreds of thousands of Greek men had to either receive military training or spend part of their military service here (see conscription in Greece). The famous 1991 George Dalaras and Lavrentis Machairitsas song Didymoteicho Blues (Greek: Διδυμότειχο Μπλουζ) pays homage to the personal stories and experiences of these soldiers while offering a more general commentary about life in the Army.

== Landmarks ==
- The Didymoteicho Fortress, the medieval citadel or "old town", situated in the northwestern part of town
- The Çelebi Sultan Mehmed Mosque or Beyazid Mosque, completed in 1420.
- Didymoteicho Folklore Museum
- The Silent Baths or Oruç Pasha Hamam, the oldest hamam in Europe. Today there are only ruins of the baths but a European Union project has been initiated to restore them.
- International Centre of Young Artists of Eastern Europe, Website
- Central Square, next to the town hall
- Feridun Ahmed Bey Hamam
- Golden Bust of Septimius Severus discovered in Didymoteicho, now in Archaeological Museum of Komotini
- Didymoteicho Military Museum
- Municipal Theatre, on Georgios I Street
- The ruins of the ancient city of Plotinopolis.
- Oruç Pasha türbe

== Transport ==
=== Rail ===
The town is served by a station on the Alexandroupoli–Svilengrad Line.

== Historical population ==
Year	Municipal unit	Municipality
1991	19,450	–
2001	18,998	–
2011	16,078	19,493
2021	13,673	16,060

== Notable people ==
- Balım Sultan, Bektashi sufi
- Bayezid II (1481–1512) Sultan of the Ottoman Empire
- John III Doukas Vatatzes (c. 1192–1254), emperor of Nicaea
- John V Palaiologos (1332–1391), Byzantine Emperor
- Eugenios Eugenidis (1882–1954), shipping magnate
- Sürmeli Ali Pasha (c. 1645–1695), Grand Vizier of the Ottoman Empire
- Konstantinos Gatsioudis, javelin thrower
- Zoi Dimoschaki, swimmer from Isaakio, a village near Didymoteicho

== Gallery ==
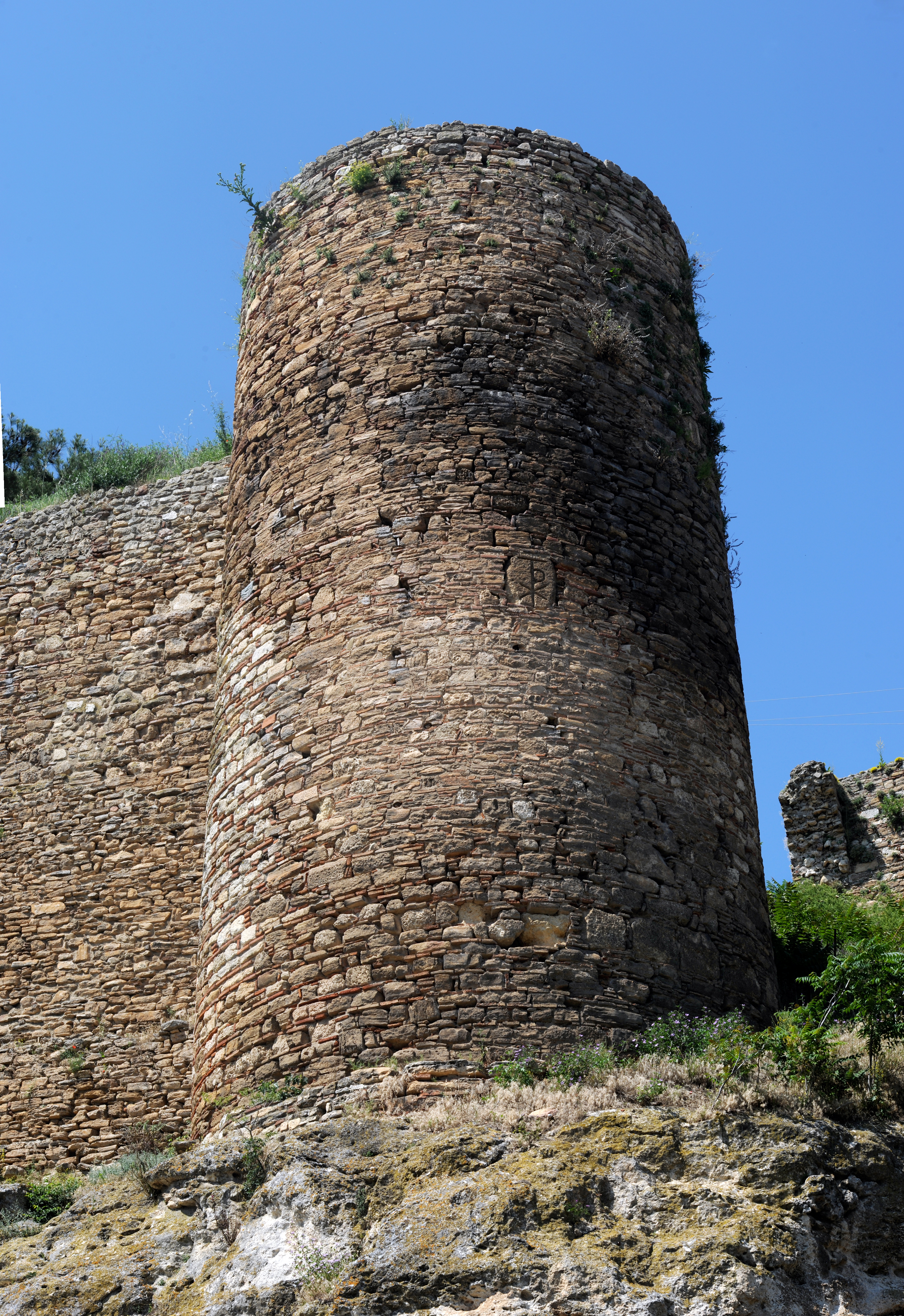
Vasilopoula Byzantine tower

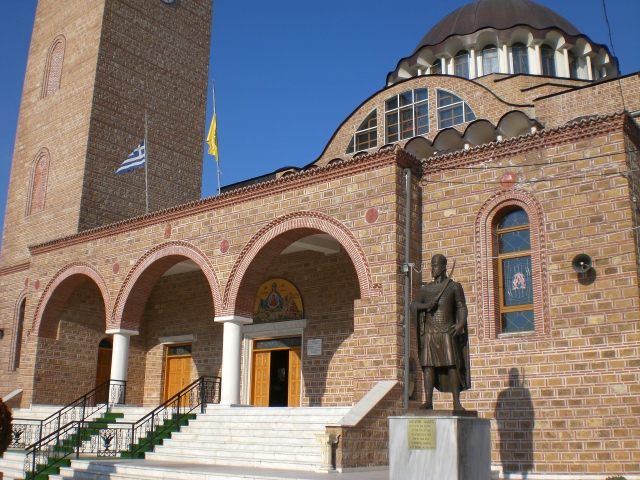
The entrance of the church with a statue of Constantine XI Palaiologos

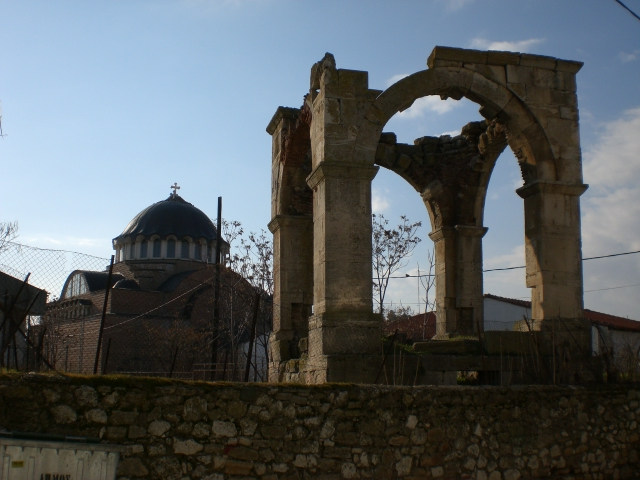
The church with the remains of an arch

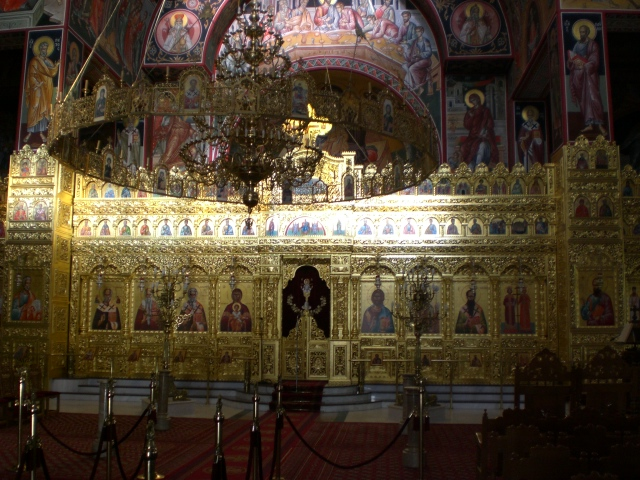
Church interior

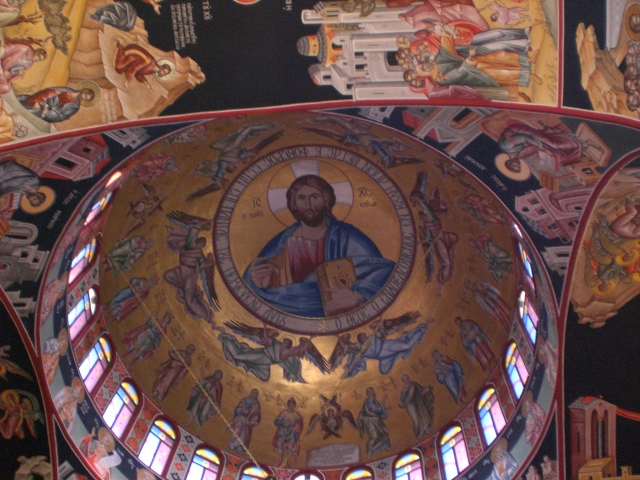
Church dome interior

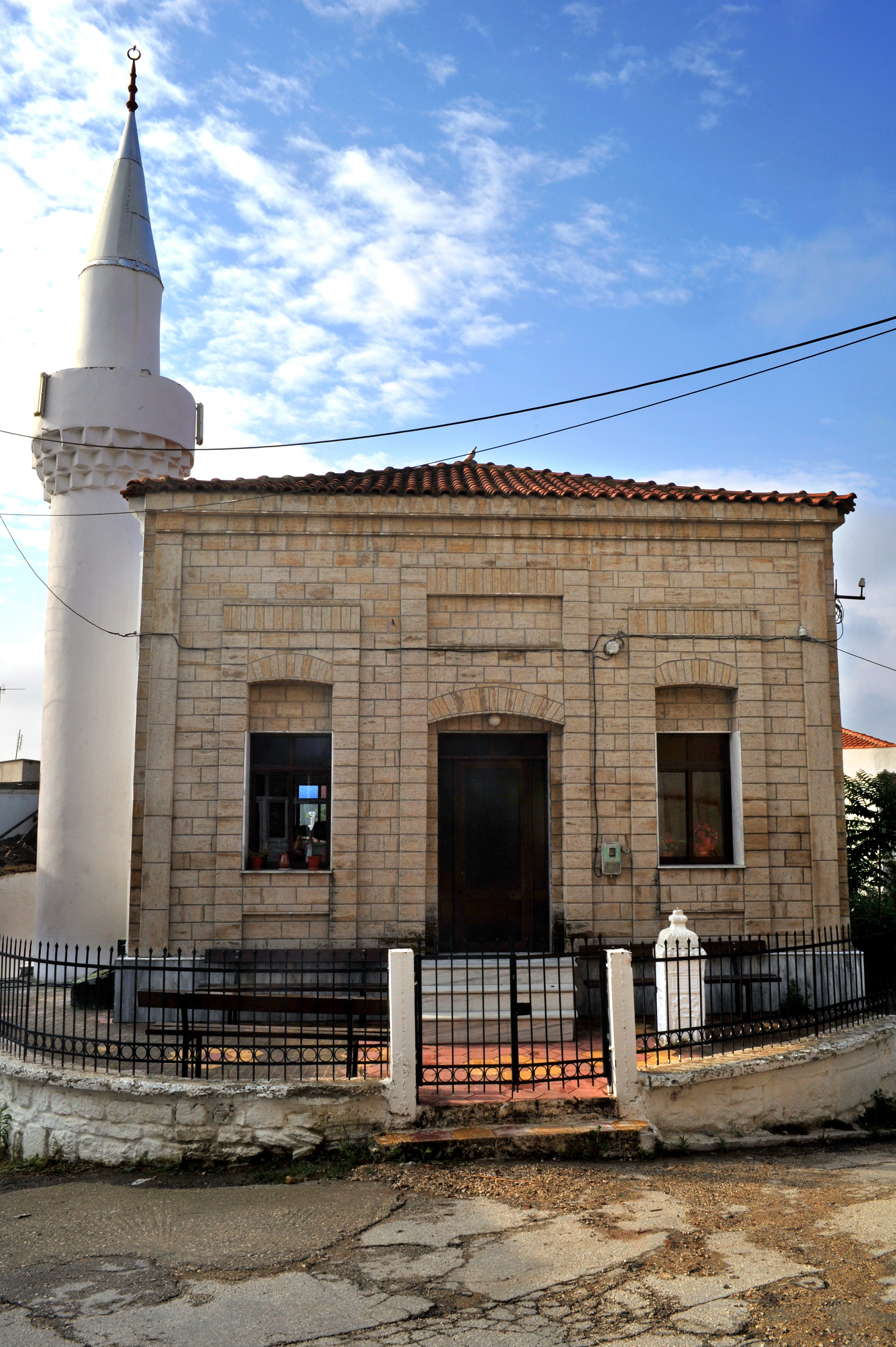
Alaca mosque

Byzantine Museum of Didymoteicho

== See also ==
- List of settlements in the Evros regional unit

== Sources ==
- Fine, John V. A. (1994) [1987]. The Late Medieval Balkans: A Critical Survey from the Late Twelfth Century to the Ottoman Conquest. Ann Arbor, Michigan: University of Michigan Press. ISBN 978-0-472-10079-8.
- Soustal, Peter (1991). Tabula Imperii Byzantini, Band 6: Thrakien (Thrakē, Rodopē und Haimimontos) (in German). Vienna: Verlag der Österreichischen Akademie der Wissenschaften. ISBN 978-3-7001-1898-5.
- Wolff, Robert Lee (1969) [1962]. "The Latin Empire of Constantinople, 1204–1261". In Setton, Kenneth M.; Wolff, Robert Lee; Hazard, Harry W. (eds.). History: Volume II: The later Crusades, 1189-1311: VI: The Latin Empire of Constantinople, 1204-1261. Vol. 2 (Second ed.). Madison, Milwaukee, and London: University of Wisconsin Press. pp. 187–233. ISBN 0-299-04844-6.
