= Western Thrace =

Geographical and historical region of Greece

Coordinates: 41.1000°N 25.4167°E

Thrace Θράκη
- Geographic region of Greece
- Thrace (blue) within Greece
- Cession: 1920
- Replaced as administrative region by Eastern Macedonia and Thrace: 1987
- Capital: Komotini
- Regional units: List: Xanthi; Rhodope; Evros

Government
  - Deputy Minister: Konstantinos Gioulekas (New Democracy)

Area
  - Total: 8,578 km^{2} (3,312 sq mi)

Population
  - Total: 371,208 (2011 census)
  - Density: 43/km^{2} (110/sq mi)
- Demonym: Thracian
- Largest City: Alexandroupolis
- Website: www.pamth.gov.gr

Greek Thrace (Greek: Θράκη, romanized: Thráki) is a geographic and historical region of Greece, in the northeast of the country. Greek Thrace is divided into three regional units (former prefectures): Xanthi, Rhodope and Evros (including the island of Samothrace), which together with the Macedonian regional units of Drama, Kavala and Thasos form the region of Eastern Macedonia and Thrace. Its largest city is Alexandroupolis, an important port and commercial center of Northern Greece.

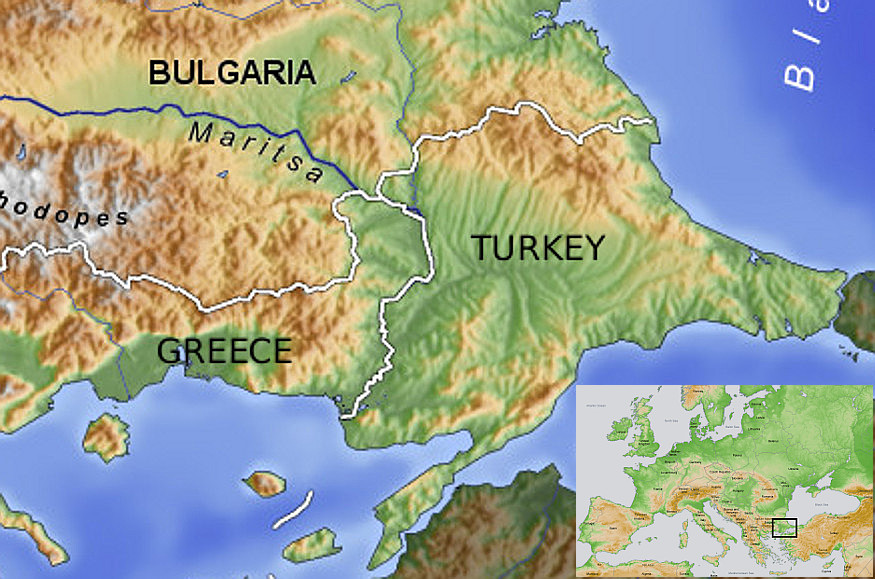
The region of Thrace in the modern boundaries of Bulgaria, Greece, and Turkey

Greek Thrace is also called Western Thrace (Greek: Δυτική Θράκη, romanized: Dytikí Thráki, IPA: [ðitiˈci ˈθɾaci]), as it constitutes the western part of the wider geographical region of Thrace; the European part of Turkey constitutes Eastern Thrace, while most of southern Bulgaria constitutes Northern Thrace. Inhabited since Paleolithic times, Thrace has been under the political, cultural and linguistic influence of the Greek world since antiquity. Thrace was part of the Byzantine themes of Thrace and Macedonia and a center of medieval Greek culture and commerce, benefiting from its position close to the imperial capital of Constantinople. After the Byzantine civil war of 1352–1357, the region was conquered by the Ottoman Turks, marking the birth of the Muslim minority of modern Greece.

== Etymology ==
The word Thrace, from ancient Greek Thrake (Θρᾴκη), referred originally to the Thracians (ancient Greek Thrâikes Θρᾷκες), an ancient people inhabiting Southeast Europe. The name Europe (ancient Greek Eurṓpē Εὐρώπη), also at first referred to this region, before that term expanded to include its modern sense.

== Geography ==
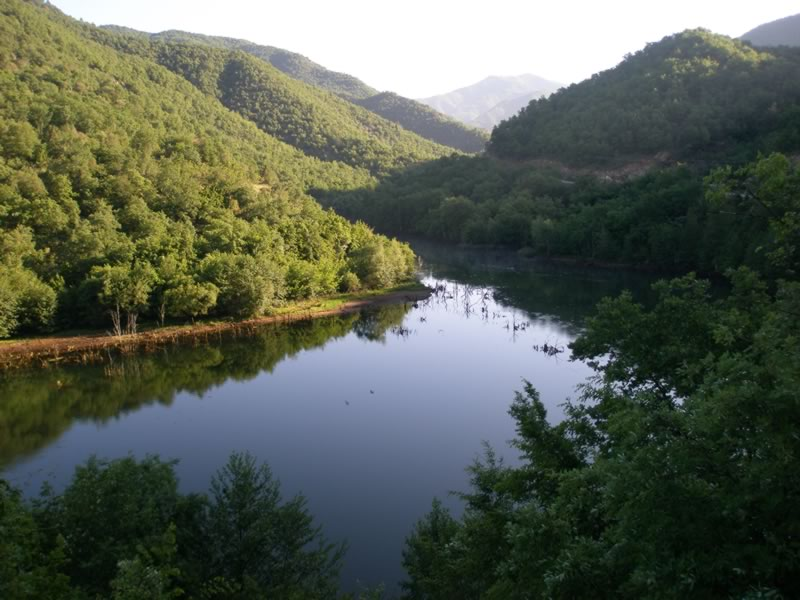
Nestos river outside the city of Xanthi

Thrace and in particular the Rhodope Mountains, its northern mountainous part, is home to one of the two surviving brown bear (species Ursus arctos) populations in Greece (the other is in the Pindus mountains, in central Greece). Topographically, Thrace alternates between mountain-enclosed basins of varying size and deeply cut river valleys. It is bounded by the Aegean Sea and more specifically the Thracian Sea to the south and by the Nestos and Evros rivers to the west and east respectively.

== History ==
=== Archaic and Classical Era ===
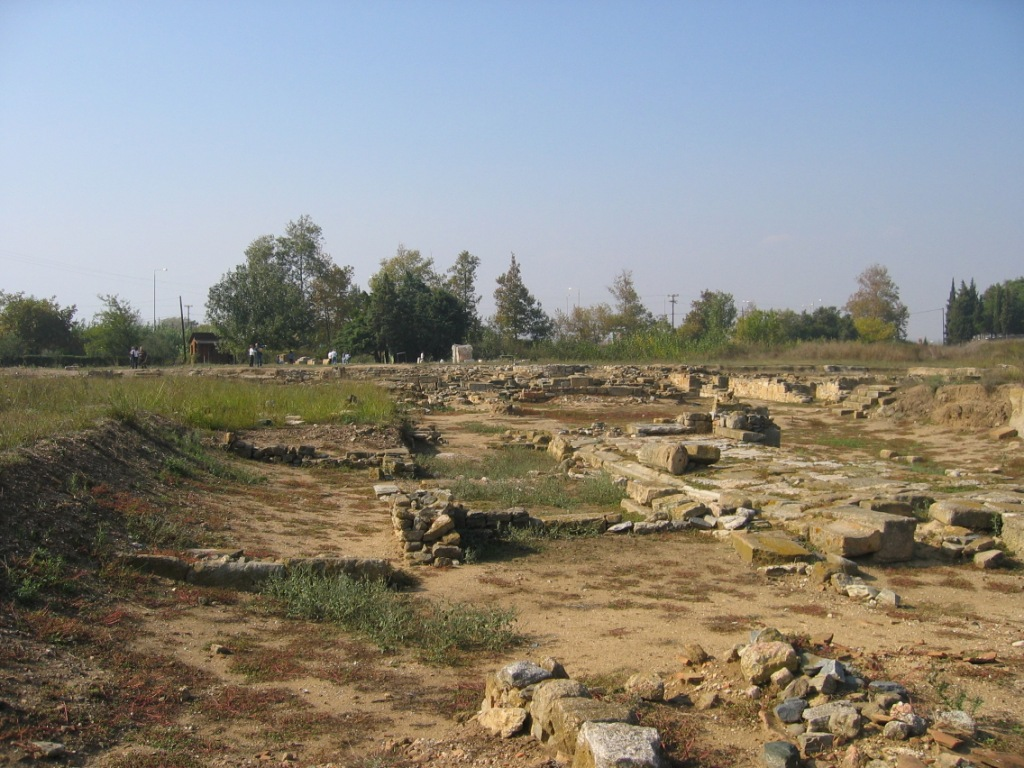
Ruins of the ancient city of Abdera

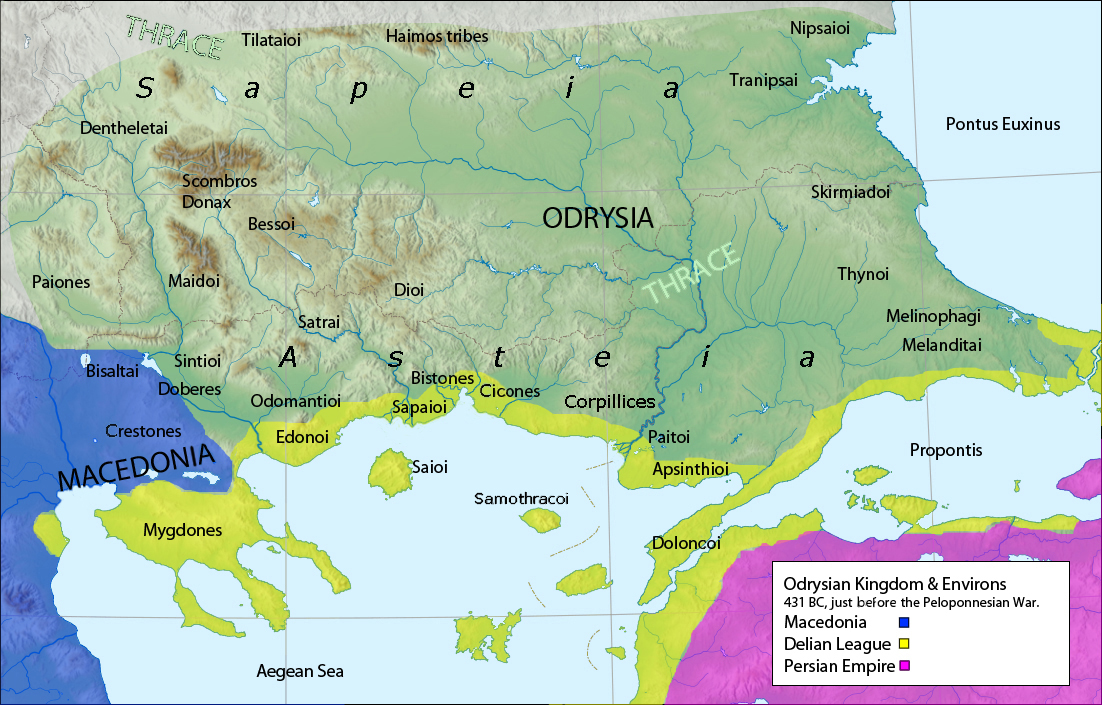
Thrace in the Odrysian Kingdom, showing several Thracian tribes. Thrace's coastal areas in the Delian League. Sapeia was Northern Thrace and Asteia was Southern Thrace

Ancient Greeks extensively colonized the region, especially the coastal part, and built prosperous cities such as Sale, Maroneia and Abdera, which was home of Democritus, the 5th-century BC philosopher who developed an atomic particle theory, and of Protagoras, a leading sophist.

The first to take greater control of Thrace, in part or whole, was the Achaemenid Empire in the late 6th century BC. The region was incorporated into the Persian empire as the Satrapy of Skudra, after the Scythian campaign of Darius the Great. Thracian soldiers were used in Persian armies and are depicted in carvings of the Persepolis and Naqsh-e Rostam.

Persians' presence in Thrace lasted up until the rise of the Delian League led by the Athenian general Cimon in the aftermath of the battle of Plataea. Cities like Sale, Maroneia and Abdera became and remained as members of the Delian league until the Spartan victory at the end of the Peloponnesian War.

In the 4th century BC most of Thrace was conquered by Philip II of Macedon and his son Alexander the Great. Notably, Thracian troops are known to have accompanied Alexander when he crossed the Hellespont which abuts Thrace, during his campaigns in the East.

=== Hellenistic era ===
Alexander's personal secretary and later Diadochi general, Eumenes was from Cardia. Most of Thrace became part of the kingdom of Lysimachus, when Alexander's empire was divided between his generals. Lysimachus founded his capital at Lysimachia and ruled as king up until his defeat from Seleucus I Nicator in 281 BC at the battle of Corupedium. Then the region was contested between Ptolemies, Seleucids, Antigonids, Attalids and Celts. During the Third Macedonian War, Cotys IV, the king of the Odrysian kingdom, allied to Perseus of Macedon against the Roman Republic and the kingdom of Pergamum.

=== Roman era ===
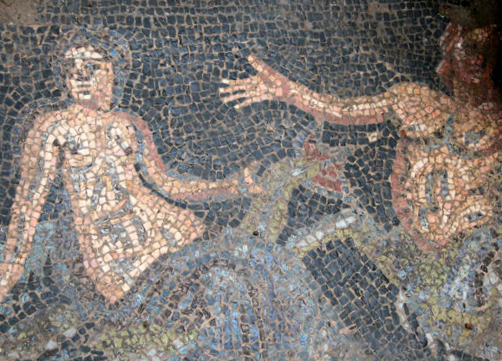
Roman mosaics in Plotinopolis, modern Didymoteicho

Claudius annexed the Sapaean kingdom and the Roman province of Thracia was founded in 46 AD (later the Diocese of Thrace). At the beginning of the 2nd AD century Roman emperor Trajan founded here, as a part of the provincial policy, two cities of Greek type (i.e. city-states), Traianoupolis and Plotinopolis. From this region passed the famous Via Egnatia, which ensured the communication between East and West, while its ramifications were connecting the Aegean world with Thracian hinterland (i.e. upper and middle valley of Evros river). From the coast also passed the sea route Troad–Macedonia, which the Apostle Paul had used in his journeys in Greece.

During the great crisis of the Roman Empire in the 3rd century AD, Western Thrace suffered from the frequent incursions of the barbarians until the reign of Diocletian, when it managed to prosper again thanks to its administrative reforms.

=== Byzantine era ===
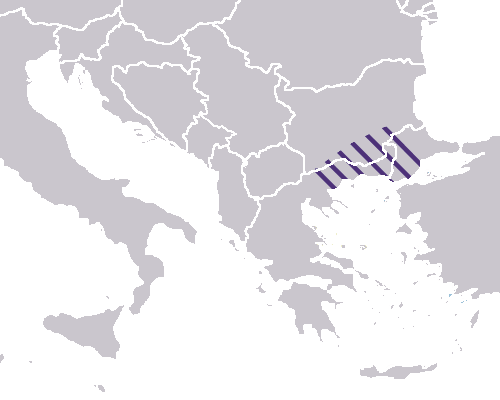
Approximate widest extent of the theme of Macedonia, superimposed on modern borders. It covers most of Eastern Macedonia and Thrace.

The region was at the core of the Byzantine Empire, close to its capital Constantinople, which was located at the site of ancient Byzantium, from the time of the division of the Roman Empire into Eastern and Western empires in the early fourth century AD.

It was part of the theme of Thrace and then part of the theme of Macedonia, from where the Macedonian dynasty originated. The core area of the old theme of Macedonia was recorded as the "province of Adrianople and Didymoteichon" (provincia Adrianupoleos et Didimotichi).

Manuel Erotikos Komnenos was born in the theme of Thrace, who was the first fully documented ancestor of the Komnenos dynasty. The emperor of Nicaea, John III Doukas Vatatzes, was born c. 1192 in Didymoteicho, and was probably the son of the general Basil Vatatzes, who was killed in battle in 1194, and his wife, a cousin of the Emperors Isaac II Angelos and Alexios III Angelos. Byzantine emperor John V Palaiologos was born on 18 June 1332 in Didymoteicho.

=== Ottoman era ===
The Ottoman Empire conquered most of the region in the late 14th century and ruled it until the Balkan Wars of 1912–1913. During that period, Thrace had a mixed population of Greeks, Turks and Bulgarians, while a smaller number of Pomaks, Jews, Armenians and Romani also lived in the region.

Flag of Greek revolutionaries in Thrace and Samothrace during the Greek War of Independence

At 1821, several parts of Thrace, such as Lavara, Maroneia, and Samothrace participated in the Greek War of Independence.

=== Balkan Wars and WWI ===
During the First Balkan War, the Balkan League (Serbia, Greece, Bulgaria and Montenegro) fought against the Ottoman Empire and annexed most of its European territory, including Thrace. Western Thrace was occupied by Bulgarian troops who defeated the Ottoman army. On 15 November 1912, on the right bank of the river Maritza, Macedonian-Adrianopolitan Volunteer Corps captured the Turkish corps of Yaver Paha, which defended Eastern Rhodopes and Western Thrace from invading Bulgarians.

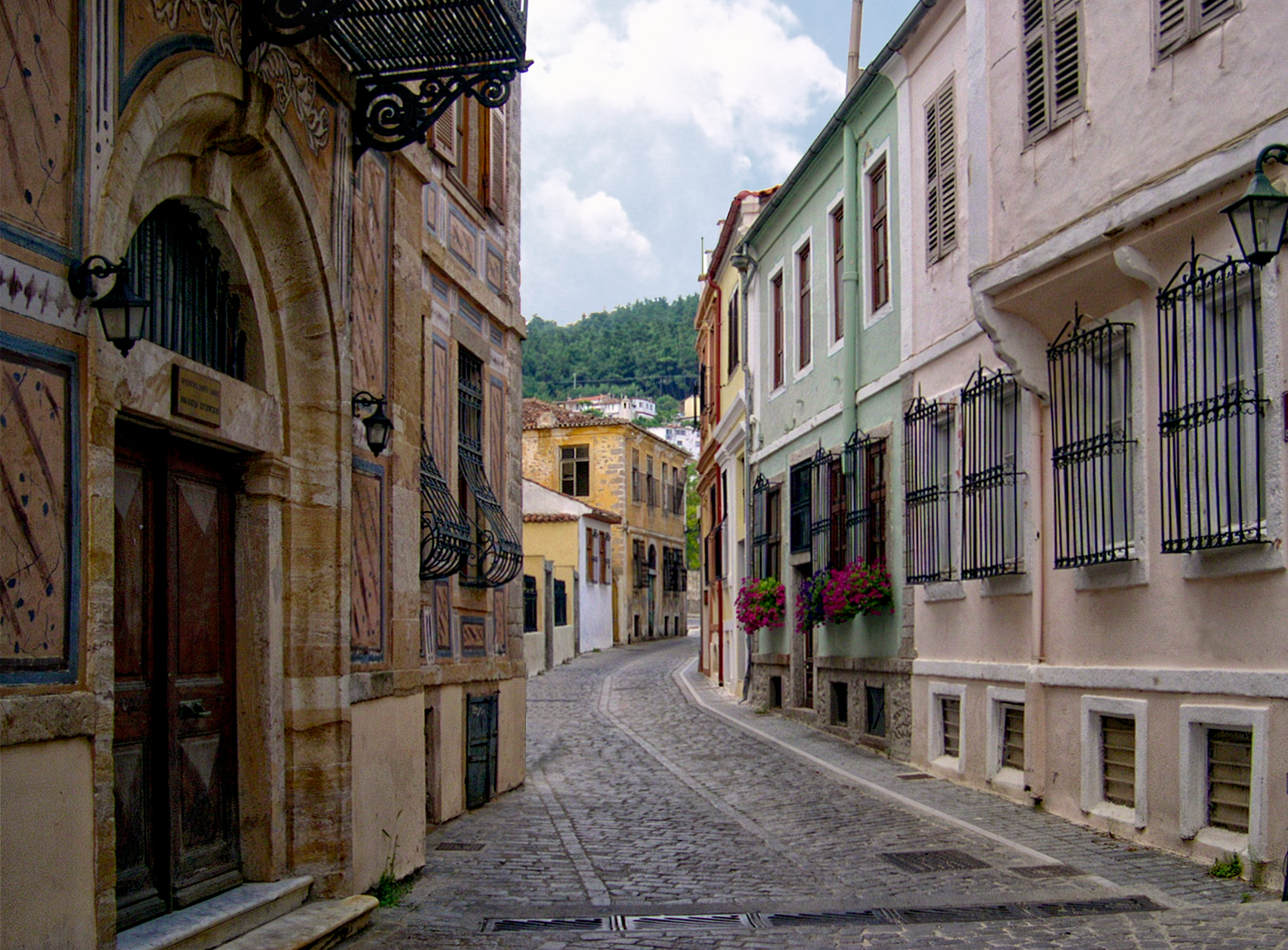
View of the old town of Xanthi

The victors quickly fell into dispute on how to divide the newly conquered lands, resulting in the Second Balkan War. In August 1913, Bulgaria was defeated, but kept Western Thrace under the terms of the Treaty of Bucharest.

In the following years, the Central Powers (Germany, Austria-Hungary, and the Ottoman Empire), with which Bulgaria had sided, lost World War I, and as a result, Bulgaria had to surrender Western Thrace under the terms of the 1919 Treaty of Neuilly. Western Thrace was under temporary management of the Entente led by French General Charles Antoine Charpy. In late April 1920, as per the San Remo conference which gathered the leaders of the main allies of the Entente powers (except the US), Western Thrace was given to Greece. Throughout the Balkan Wars and World War I, Bulgaria, Greece and Turkey each forced respective minority populations in the Thrace region out of areas they controlled.

==== Greek refugees ====
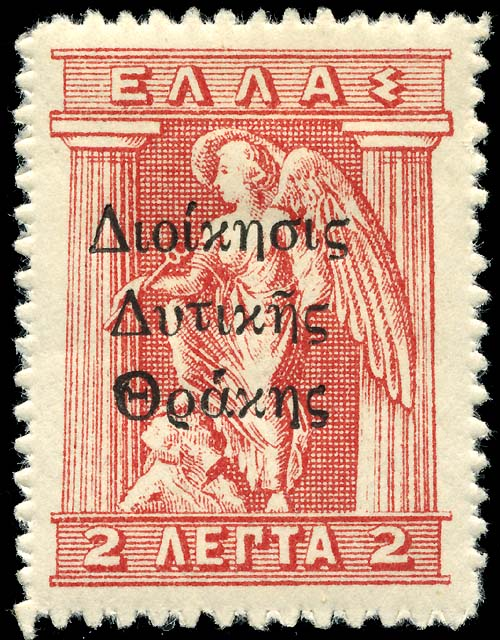
Greek administration stamp in Western Thrace, 1920

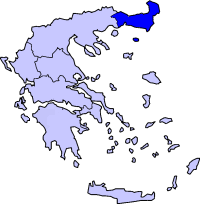
Western Thrace within Greece

A large population of Greeks from Eastern Thrace, Eastern Rumelia and Black Sea coastal areas, as well as Greeks from Anatolia, including Pontic Greeks and Cappadocian Greeks, was expelled into Greek-controlled Thrace. This was followed by the large-scale Greek-Turkish population exchanges of 1923, which finalized the reversal of Western and Eastern Thrace region's pre-Balkan War demography. Concurrently, a large population of Bulgarians was forced from the region into Bulgaria by Greek and Turkish actions. Turkish populations in the area were also targeted by Bulgarian and Greek forces and pushed eastward. As part of the Treaty of Neuilly and subsequent agreements, the status of the expelled populations was legitimized.

The Treaty of Lausanne granted the status of a minority to the Muslims of Western Thrace. A similar status was also granted for the Greek minority in Istanbul and the islands of Imbros and Tenedos, which however were affected by the Expulsion of Greeks from Istanbul and the Istanbul pogrom.

=== WWII ===
After the German invasion (April 1941), the area was occupied by Bulgarian troops, as part of the triple Axis occupation of Greece, during World War II. Greek resistance emerged soon.

==== Jews and the Holocaust ====
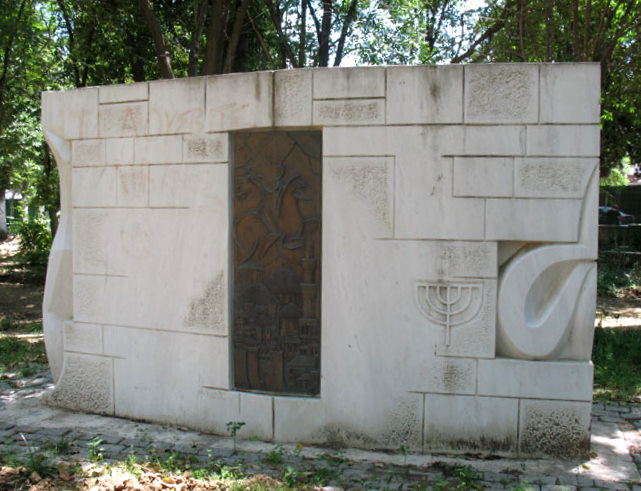
Holocaust Memorial

Before World War 2, Western Thrace was home to a Sephardic and Ashkenazi Jewish population. After Greece was occupied by Axis forces, around 4,075 Jews living in Western Thrace and Macedonia were sent to Treblinka extermination camp and were murdered. During this period (1941–1944) the demographic distribution was further changed, with the arrest of the region's approximately 4,500 Jews by the Bulgarian police and their deportation to death camps administered by Germany. None of them survived.

==== Present-day ====
The Democritus University of Thrace is based in Komotini and has also campuses in Xanthi, Alexandroupoli, Orestiada and Didymoteicho. The Fourth Army Corps of the Hellenic Army has its headquarters in Xanthi.

In recent years, the region has attracted international media attention after becoming an entering point for illegal immigration into European Union territory; Greek security forces, working together with Frontex, are also extensively deployed in the Greco-Turkish land border.

== Economy ==
The economy of Thrace in recent years has become less dependent on agriculture. A number of Greek-owned high-tech telecommunications companies have settled in the area. The A2 motorway (Egnatia Odos) motorway which passes through Thrace has contributed to the further development of the region. Tourism is slowly becoming more and more important as the Aegean coast has a number of beaches, and there is also the potential for winter tourism activities in the Rhodopi mountains, the natural border with Bulgaria, which are covered by dense forest.

== Demographics ==
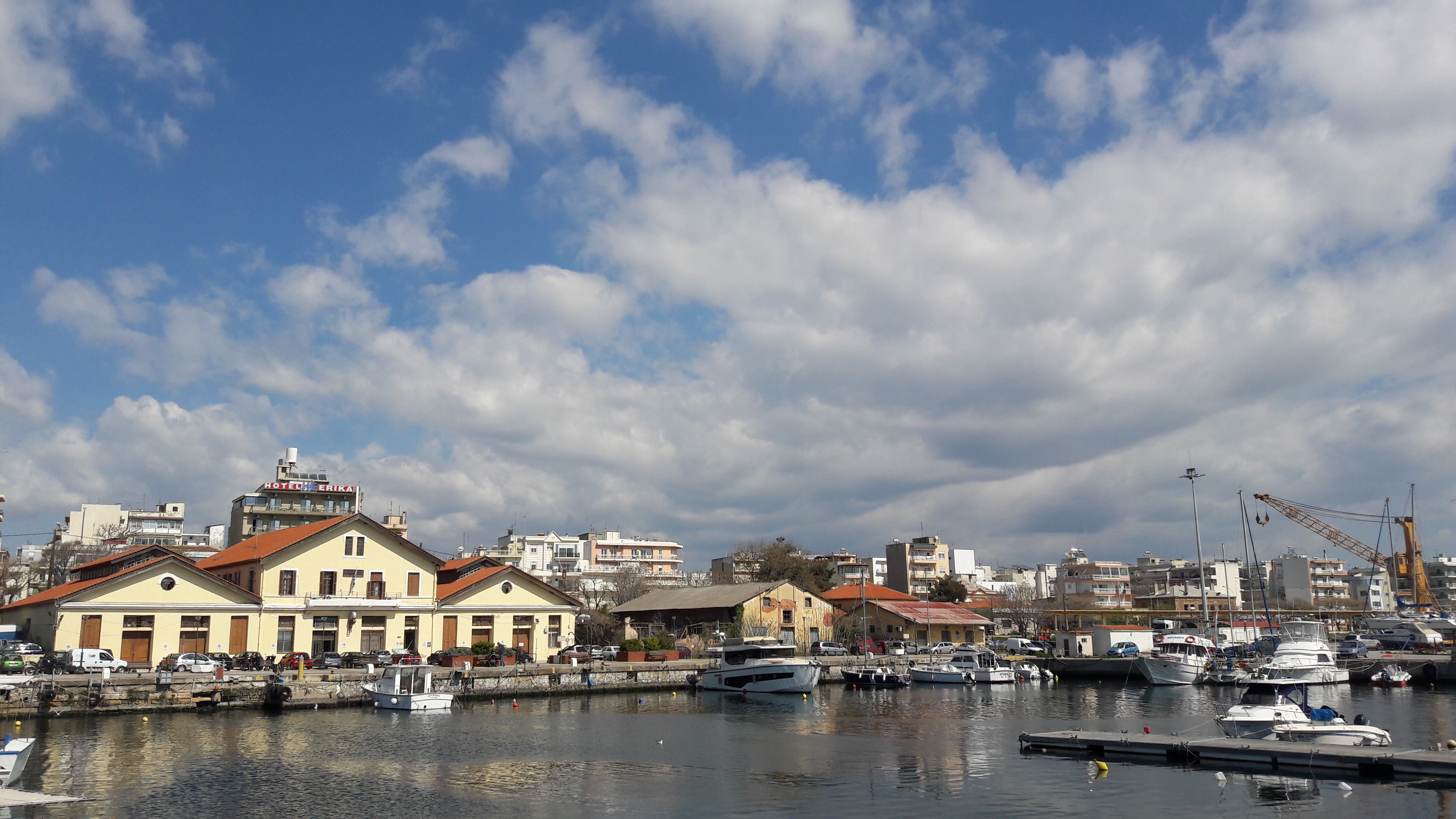
The port of Alexandroupolis

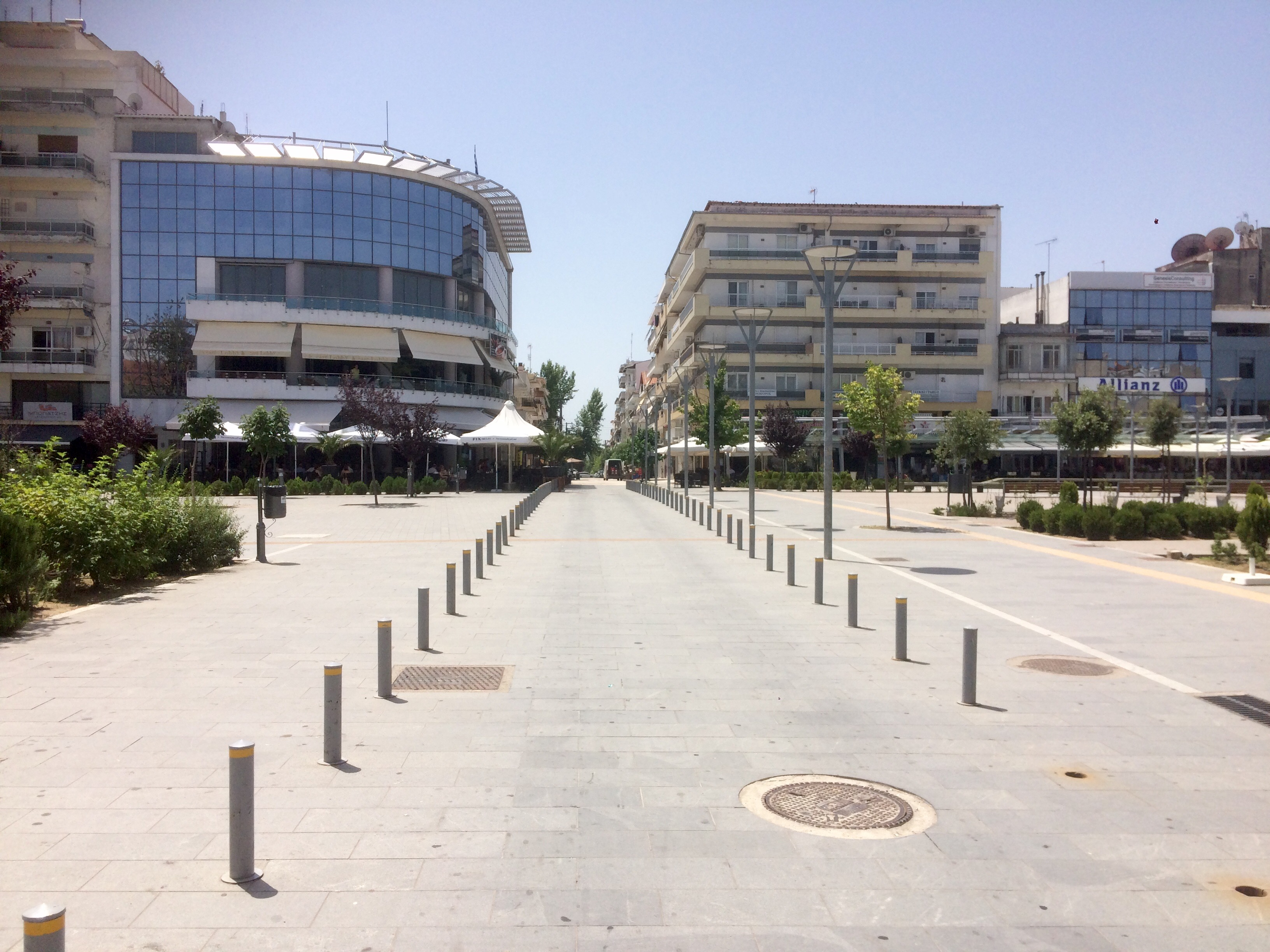
Orestiada

The approximate area of Western Thrace is 8,578 km^{2} with a population of 371,208 according to the 2011 census. Greek Thrace is bordered by Bulgaria to the north, Turkey to the east, the Aegean Sea (Greece) to the south and Greek Macedonia to the west. Alexandroupolis is the largest city, with a municipal population of 72,959 according to the 2011 census. Below is a table of the five largest Thracian cities:

City	Greek	Town/city population (2011)	Municipality population (2011)
Alexandroupolis	Αλεξανδρούπολη	58,125	72,959
Komotini	Κομοτηνή	54,272	66,919
Xanthi	Ξάνθη	56,151	65,133
Orestiada	Ορεστιάδα	20,211	37,695
Didymoteicho	Διδυμότειχο	9,367	19,493

=== Religion ===
It is estimated that two-thirds (67%) of the population are Orthodox Christian Greeks, while about a third (33%) are Muslims who are an officially recognised minority of Greece.

According to the 1991 census, the Muslim minority numbered around 98,000 people or 29% of the population of Thrace, of which about half were Western Thrace Turks and the rest (35%) Pomaks and Muslim Romani people (15%). The Romani of Thrace are also mainly Muslim, unlike their ethnic kin in other parts of the country who generally profess the Orthodox faith of the Greek majority. Turkey, a signatory state of the Lausanne Treaty, initially claimed the whole of the Muslim minority to be strictly an ethnic Turkish minority even though it actually consists of multiple ethnic groups. In his 7 December 2017 visit to Greece Turkish President Recep Tayyip Erdoğan, acknowledged for the first time the multi-ethnic nature of the Western Thracian Muslim minority.

In the 2014 European elections in Greece, 42,533 people from Eastern Macedonia and Thrace voted for the Party of Friendship, Equality and Peace.

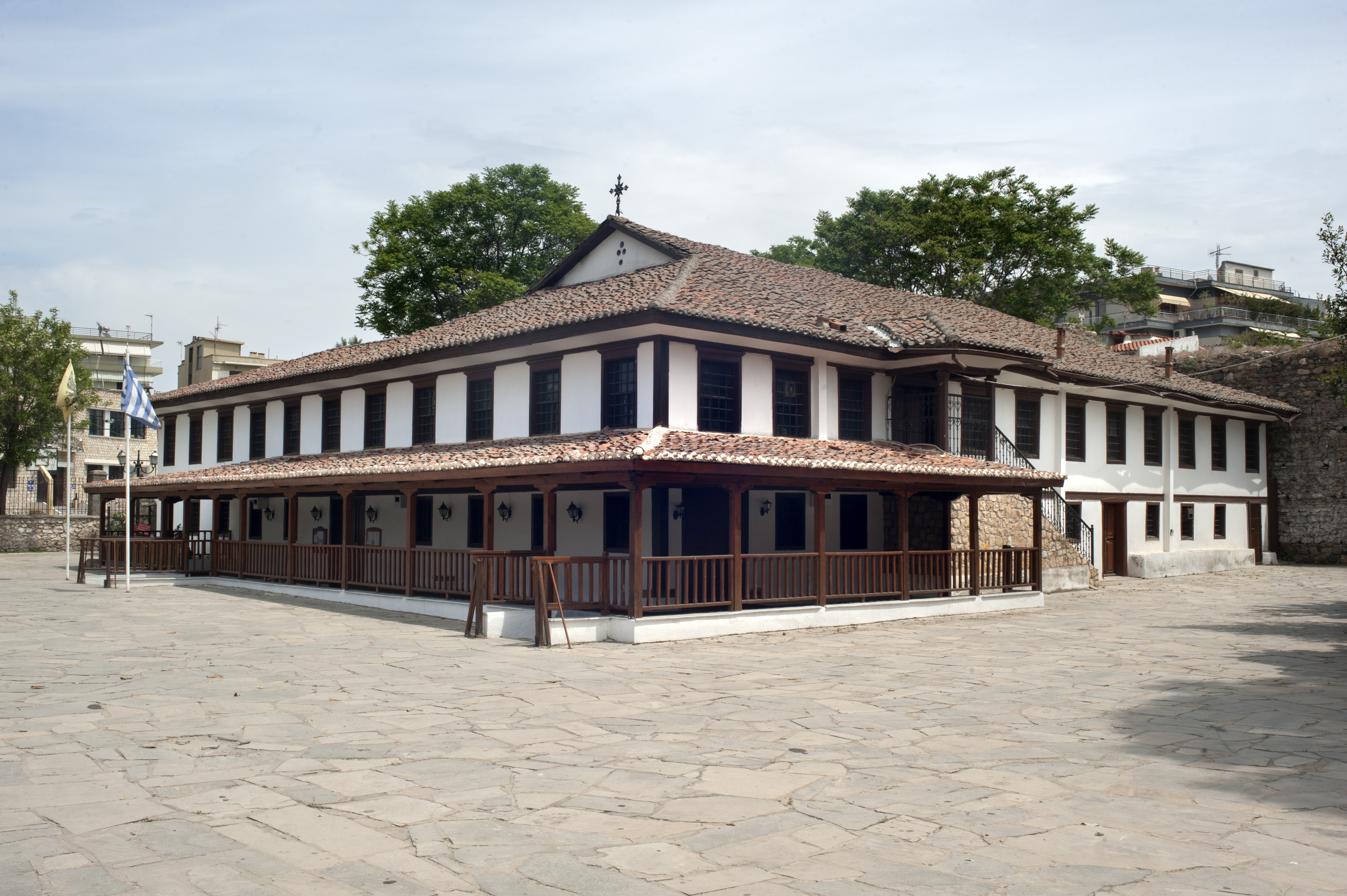
Kimisis Tis Theotokou, Greek Orthodox Church, Komotini, West Thrace

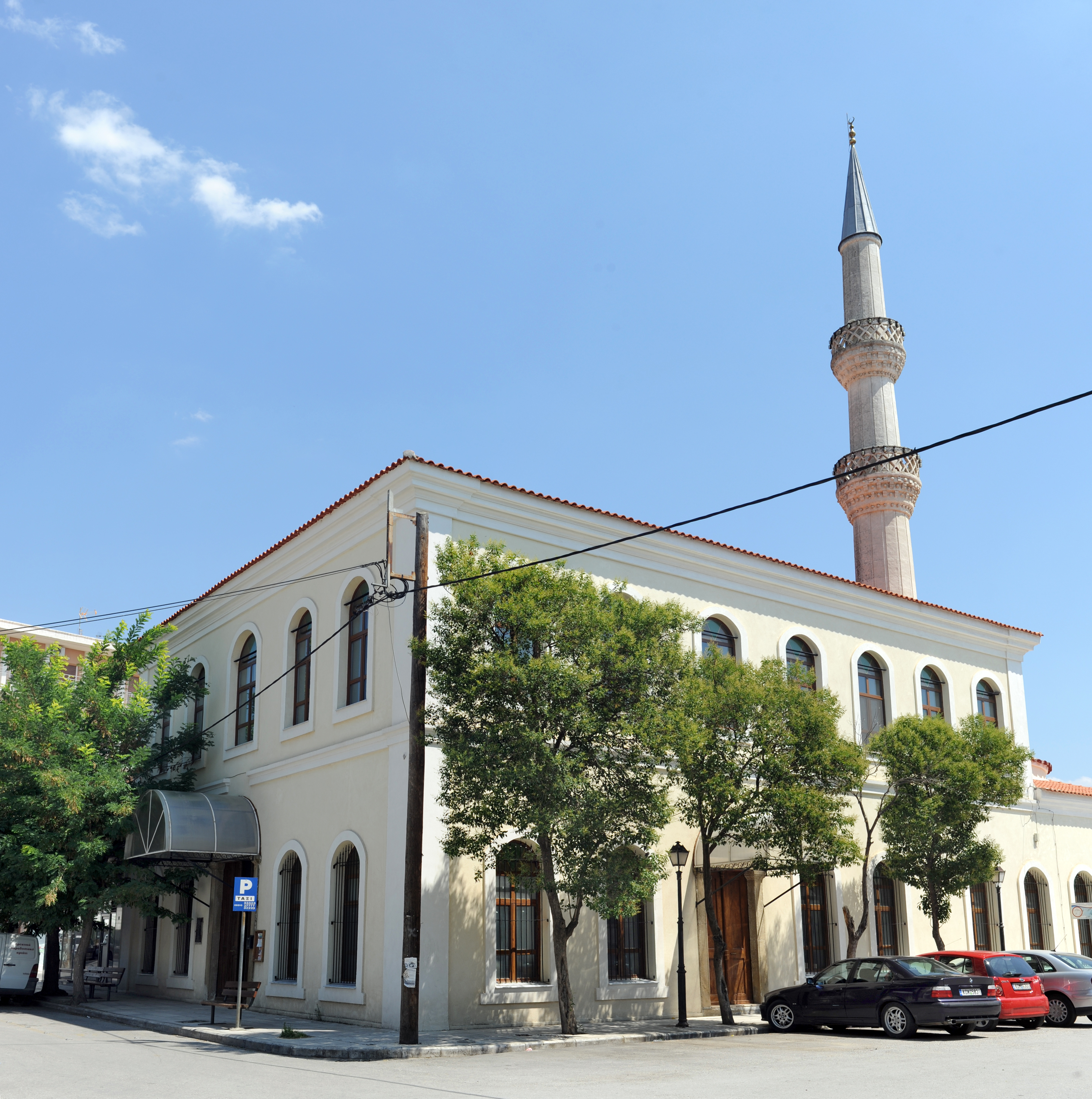
Eski Mosque in Komotini

=== Historical demographics ===
The last censuses which asked about ethnicity were held in the transitional period before the region became part of Greece. A number of estimates and censuses during the 1912-1920 period gave the following results about the ethnic distribution of the area that would become known as Western Thrace:

General Distribution of Population in Western Thrace (1912–1920)
Census/Estimate	Muslims	Pomaks	Bulgarians	Greeks	Others	Total
1912 estimate	120,000	-	40,000	60,000	4,000	224,000
1919 Bulgarian	79,539	17,369	87,941	28,647	10,922	224,418
1919 Bulgarian	77,726	20,309	81,457	32,553	8,435	220,480
1920 French	74,730	11,848	54,092	56,114	7,906	204,690
1920 Greek	93,273	-	25,677	74,416	6,038	201,404

The Pomak population depending on the source was sometimes counted together with the Turks (Muslims) following the Ottoman system of classifying people according to religion, while in other occasions was specified separately. According to the Bulgarian view, they are considered "Bulgarian Muslims" and an integral part of the Bulgarian nation.

By the Bulgarian census in 1919, held on the request of the Entente, of the population of Western Thrace was 219,723 of whom: Turks 35.4% (77,726 Muslims), Bulgarians 46.3% (101,766 - 81,457 Christians and 20,309 Muslims), Greeks 14.8% (32,553 Christians), Jews 1.4% (3,066) Armenians 1.5% (2,369), others 0.,9% (1,243). The area ceded to the Entente also included Karaagach and its environs, which became part of Turkey after the Treaty of Lausanne.

1919 Bulgarian Census of Western Thrace
Districts	Total	Turks	Bulgarian Christians	Bulgarian Muslims (Pomaks)	Greeks	Jews	Armenians	Others
Karaagach	25,669	-	12,874	-	11,133	284	835	443
Dimotika	25,081	581	6,070	-	16,856	1,152	298	47
Soflu	16,748	339	12,280	-	4,097	9	21	50
Dedeagach	18,380	625	17,036	-	18	164	465	72
Gumurdjina	92,235	55,754	21,879	10,802	364	1,200	650	1,579
Xanthi	41,619	20,350	10,575	9,500	85	250	100	-
Total	219,723	77,726 (35.4%)	81,457 (37.1%)	20,309 (9.2%)	32,553 (14.8%)	3,066 (1.4%)	2,369 (1.5%)	2,243 (0.6%)

Western Thrace was ceded to the Entente in December 1919, after which many Bulgarians left the region, while many Greeks moved in. The Government of the Entente (led by French general Sharpe) held its own census in 1920, according to which Western Thrace had a population of 204,700, of whom: Turks 36.5% (74,720 Muslims), Bulgarians 32.2% (65,927 = 54,079 Christians and 11,848 Muslims), Greeks 27.4% (56,114 Christians), Jews 1.5% (2,985) Armenians 0.9% (1,880), others 3,066. At the time this census was conducted, a part of the Greek population of Xanthi, who left massively the Xanthi district after the Balkan wars (1913), returned.

Census in 1920 conducted by the Entente Powers in Western Thrace.
Districts	Total	Turks	Bulgarians	Pomaks (Bulgarian Muslims)	Greeks	Jews	Armenians	Others
Karaagach	27,193	5	10,200	-	15,045	370	450	1,123
Dimotika	26,313	1,247	4,956	-	18,856	878	157	192
Soflu	21,250	2,770	10,995	-	7,435	-	-	50
Dedeagach	16,317	640	11,543	-	3,355	165	512	102
Komotini	64,961	39,601	14,794	2,341	4,773	1,292	651	1,559
Xanthi	48,666	30,538	1,591	9,507	6,650	280	200	-
Total	204,700	74,720 (36.5%)	54,079 (26.4%)	11,848 (5,8%)	56,114 (27.4%)	2,985 (1.5%)	1,880 (0.9%)	3,066 (1.5%)

According to the Turkish researches the population of Western Thrace in 1923 was 191,699, of whom 129,120 (67%) were Turks/Muslims (also includes the Pomaks) and 33,910 (18%) were Greeks; the remaining 28,669 (15%) were mostly (Christian) Bulgarians, along with small numbers of Jews and Armenians (before the population exchange).

General Distribution of Population in Western Thrace in 1923, prior to the Greek-Turkish population exchange, according to Turkish claims (based on of 1913)
Districts	Total	Turks	Greeks	Bulgarians	Jews	Armenians
Soufli	31,768	14,736	11,542	5,490	-	-
Alexandroupolis	27,473	11,744	4,800	10,227	253	449
Komotini	80,165	59,967	8,834	9,997	1,007	360
Xanthi	52, 255	42,671	8,728	522	220	114
Total	191,699	129,120 (67,4%)	33,910 (17,7%)	26,266 (13,7%)	1,480 (0,8%)	923 (0,5%)

General Distribution of Population in Western Thrace in 1923, according to Greek delegation in Laussane
Districts	Total	Greeks	Turks	Bulgarians	Jews	Armenians
Didymoteicho	34,621	31,408	3,213	-	-	-
Soufli	32,299	25,758	5,454	1,117	-	-
Orestiada	39,386	33,764	6,072	-	-	-
Alexandroupolis	38,553	26,856	2,705	9,102	-	-
Komotini	104,108	45,516	50,081	6,609	1,112	1,183
Xanthi	64,744	36,859	27,882	-	-	-
Total	314,235	199,704 (63,6%)	95,407 (30,4%)	16,828 (5,4%)	1,112 (0,4%)	1,183 (0,4%)

The population of the region, according to the official census of 1928 and 1951 conducted by the local authorities, per mother tongue, was as follows:

Population in Western Thrace per mother tongue, 1928 (official census)
Prefectures	Total	Greek	Turkish	Slavic	Aromanian	Albanian	Pomak	Jewish	Other
Evros	122,730	102,688	16,626	520	5	9	2	1,010	1,870
Xanthi	89,266	44,343	27,562	294	37	175	14,257	694	1,904
Rodopi	91,175	36,216	49,521	245	26	21	2,481	1,178	1,487
Total	303,171	183,247 (60,4%)	93,709 (30,9%)	1,059 (0,3%)	68 (<0,1%)	205 (<0,1%)	16,740 (5,5%)	2,882 (1%)	5,261 (1,7%)

Population in Western Thrace per mother tongue, 1951 (official census)
Prefectures	Total	Greek	Turkish	Slavic	Aromanian	Albanian	Pomak	Jewish	Other
Evros	141,340	126,229	10,061	0	18	4,121	112	18	781
Xanthi	89,891	46,147	26,010	8	5	354	16,926	2	439
Rodopi	105,723	45,505	57,785	0	2	5	1,628	8	790
Total	336,954	217,881 (64,7%)	93,856 (27,9%)	8 (<0,1%)	25 (<0,1%)	4,480 (1,3%)	18,666 (5,5%)	28 (<0,1%)	2,010 (1,7%)

== Archaeological sites ==
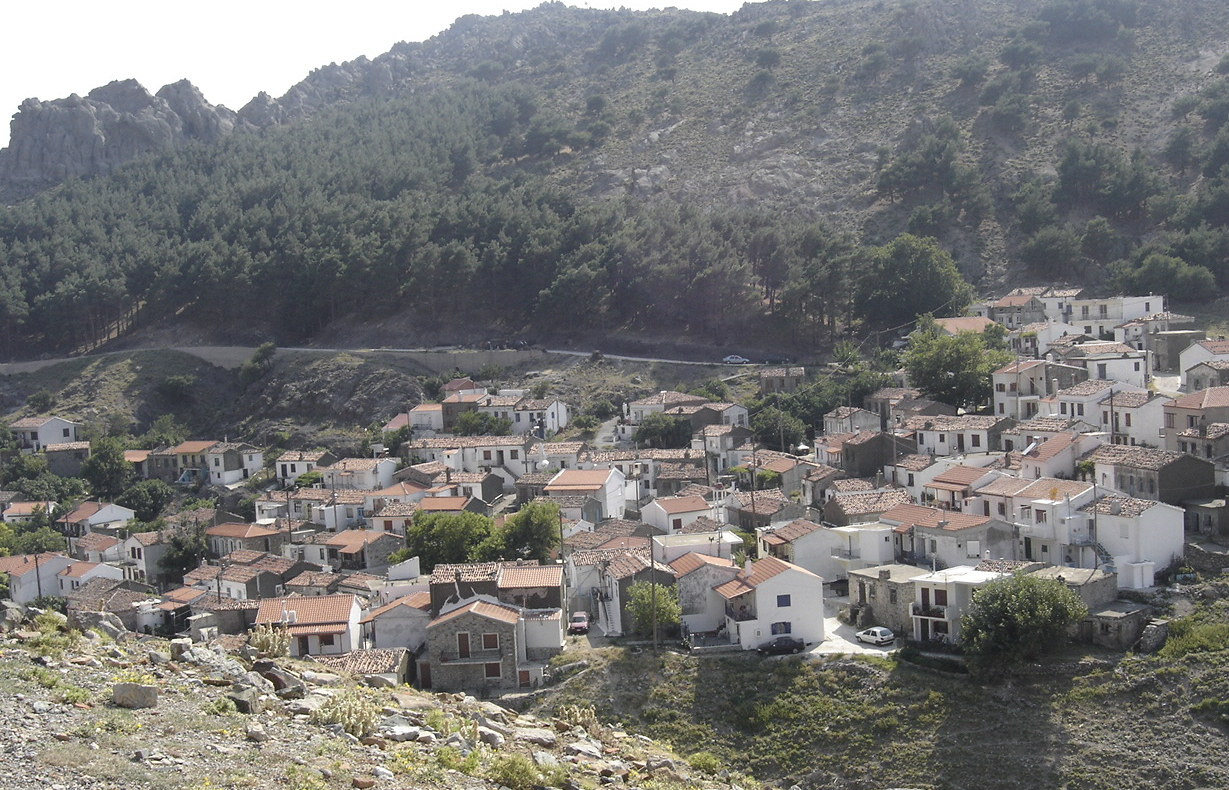
Samothrace island. The Winged Victory of Samothrace statue, which is now displayed at the Louvre in Paris, was found on the island.

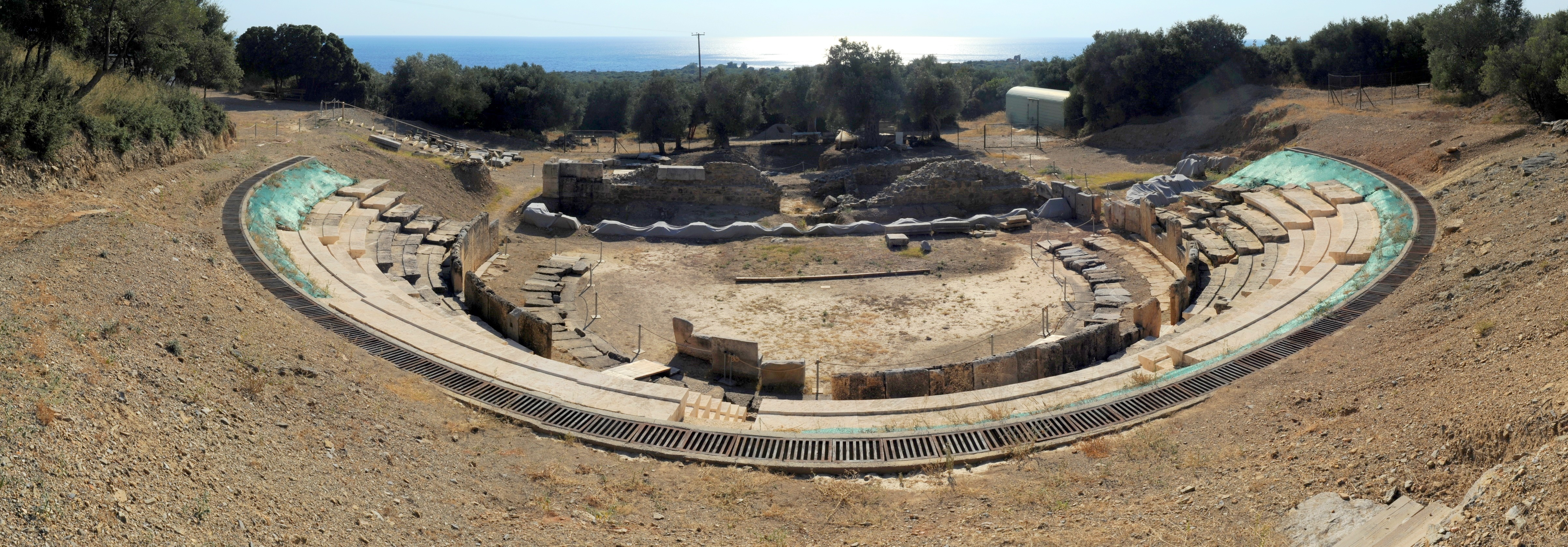
The ancient theatre of Maroneia

- Abdera, an ancient Greek coastal town in the regional unit of Xanthi, is the birthplace of the Greek philosophers Democritus, considered by some the father of the atomic theory, and Protagoras, who is credited with having invented the role of the professional sophist or teacher of "virtue".
- Maroneia, ancient theatre.
- Plotinopolis, in modern Didymoteicho.
- Didymoteicho Fortress
- Samothrace temple complex, in Samothrace island.
- Mosynopolis
- Anastasiopolis-Peritheorion
- Theotokos Kosmosoteira

== Airport ==
- Alexandroupoli Airport

== See also ==
- Decentralized Administration of Macedonia and Thrace
- Philippopolis (Thrace)
- Provisional Government of Western Thrace
- Kardzhali Province
- Macedonian Thrace Brewery

== Bibliography ==
- Bowman, Steven B. (2009). The Agony of Greek Jews, 1940–1945. Stanford University Press. ISBN 978-0-8047-7249-5.
- Öksüz, Hikmet (2004), The Reasons for Immigration from Western Thrace to Turkey (1923-1950) (PDF), Turkish Review of Balkan Studies
- Whitman, Lois (1990), Destroying ethnic identity: the Turks of Greece, Human Rights Watch, ISBN 0-929692-70-5.
- Polemis, Demetrios I. (1968). The Doukai: A Contribution to Byzantine Prosopography. London: The Athlone Press.
- Varzos, Konstantinos (1984). Η Γενεαλογία των Κομνηνών [The Genealogy of the Komnenoi] (PDF) (in Greek). Vol. B. Thessaloniki: Centre for Byzantine Studies, University of Thessaloniki.
