= Theotokos Kosmosoteira =

Former Eastern Orthodox monastery and mosque, now church in Feres, Greece

- Θεοτόκος η Κοσμοσώτειρα
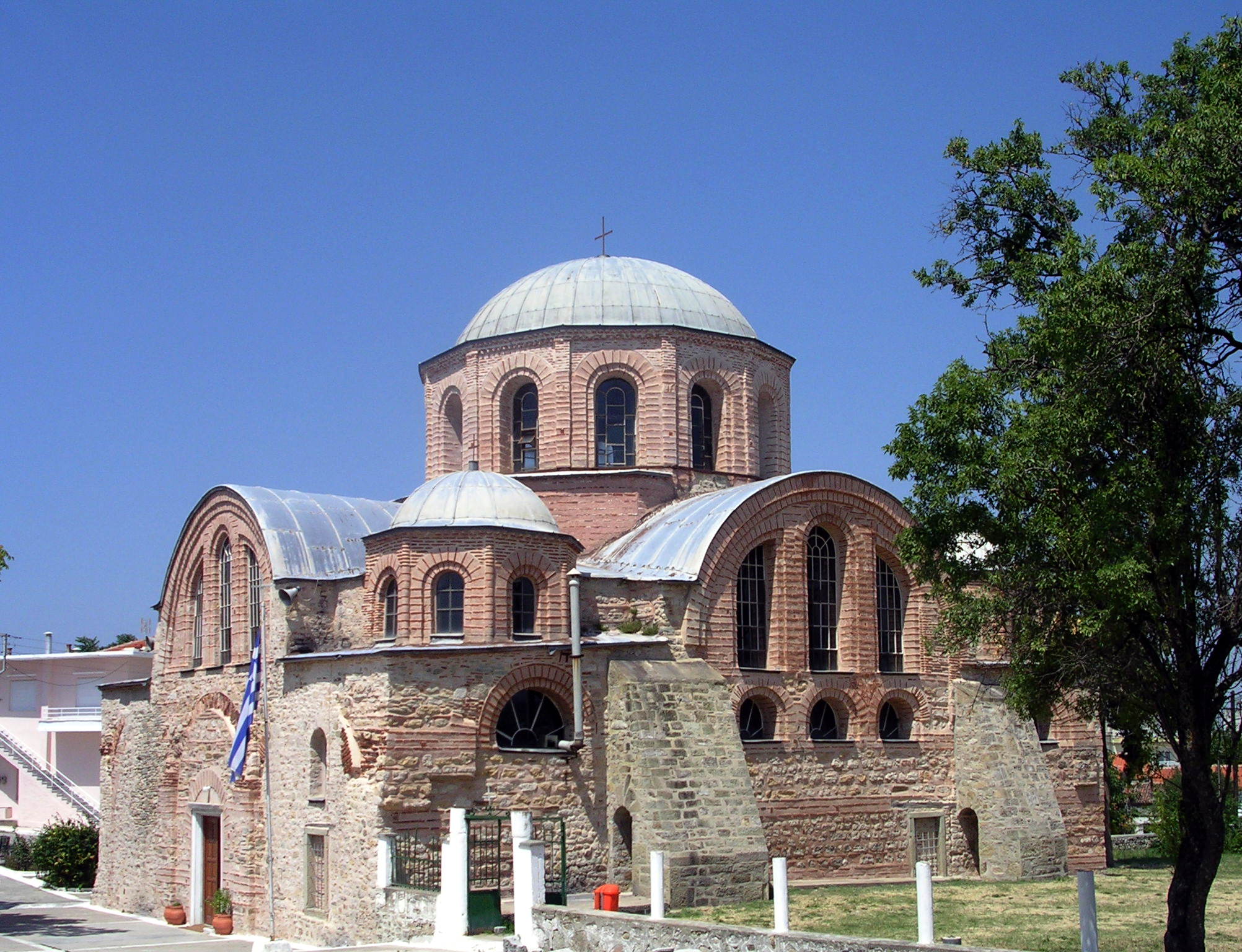
- The katholikon (main church) of the monastery, seen from the southwest. The main dome, one of the four smaller domes, and two of the later buttresses can be seen.

- Location of the former monastery, former mosque, now church, in Greece
- Theotokos Kosmosoteira
- 40°53′38″N 26°10′13″E
- Location: Feres, Evros, Western Thrace
- Country: Greece
- Language: Greek
- Denomination: Greek Orthodox
- Previous denomination: Islam (1433–1920)

History
- Former name: Suleyman Pasha Mosque
- Status: Monastery (1152–c. 1350s); Mosque (1433–1920); Church (since 1940– )
- Founder: Isaac Komnenos

Architecture
- Functional status: Active (as a church)
- Architectural type: Monastery
- Style: Byzantine; Constantinopolitan (art)
- Completed: 1152 CE (as a monastery)

Specifications
- Length: 23 m (75 ft)
- Width: 17 m (56 ft)
- Height: 17 m (56 ft)

Administration
- Metropolis: Alexandroupolis

The Theotokos Kosmosoteira (Greek: Θεοτόκος η Κοσμοσώτειρα, lit. 'Theotokos the World-Saviour') is a Greek Orthodox church in Feres, Evros, in the Western Thrace region of Greece. It was built as a monastery in c. 1152 by the sebastokrator Isaac Komnenos, a son of the Byzantine emperor Alexios I Komnenos. The monastery became the core of the settlement of Feres, but is last attested in the mid-14th century. By the 15th-century, during the Ottoman era, the complex was a mosque; and it was reconsecrated as a church in 1940, administered by the Metropolis of Alexandroupolis.

== History ==
Isaac began construction of the monastery, which was meant as his residence and final resting place, sometime before 1152. The site, known as Bera (Greek: Βήρα, from a Slavic word for "marsh") was then uninhabited and densely overgrown, but the main church (katholikon) was apparently erected on the remains of an earlier, possibly ancient Roman building.

Isaac drafted its regulations (typikon) himself, with those of the Theotokos Euergetis Monastery at Constantinople as his model. Isaac stipulated it as a cenobitic monastery for 74 monks, of whom 50 were choir brothers (free from menial labour and dedicated to the church services), all over 30 years old. Eunuchs were explicitly barred. The monastery was under the local metropolitan bishopric of Trajanopolis.

The complex was surrounded by a double fortified wall, with fortified gates and towers, of which only the interior can be traced: it apparently had a roughly hexagonal form, with towers at each corner, of which three survive in relatively good shape. It included a cistern, mill, and library, as well as a 36-bed hospital for the elderly and a bathhouse open to use by the local villagers. To support its operation and ensure its financial independence, Isaac endowed the monastery with extensive estates across Thrace. Isaac also built two bridges over the Evros river in the area, for whose upkeep the monastery's abbot was made responsible.

In winter 1183/84, Emperor Andronikos I Komnenos (r. 1183–1185), Isaac's son, visited the monastery where his father was buried. In April 1195, the deposed emperor Isaac II Angelos (r. 1185–1195, 1203–1204) was blinded there. In the partition of the Byzantine Empire after the Fourth Crusade, Bera fell to the individual Crusaders' share, and came under the control of Geoffrey of Villehardouin, who sent his nephew Anseau de Courcelles to take over the monastery and his other fiefs in the region. In the 1300s, an abbot by the name of John is attested.

Gradually, the monastery became the core of a larger settlement, which due to the endemic wars of the 14th century became the fortified town of Feres, where the local peasants sought refuge during invasions and civil wars of the period. The monastery functioned until the mid-14th century. Bera was conquered by the Ottomans under Lala Shahin Pasha in the early 1370s, and by 1433, the katholikon church had been converted into a mosque, by the name Suleyman Pasha Mosque. After the area became part of Greece in 1920, the katholikon was restored and reconsecrated as a church in 1940.

== Katholikon ==
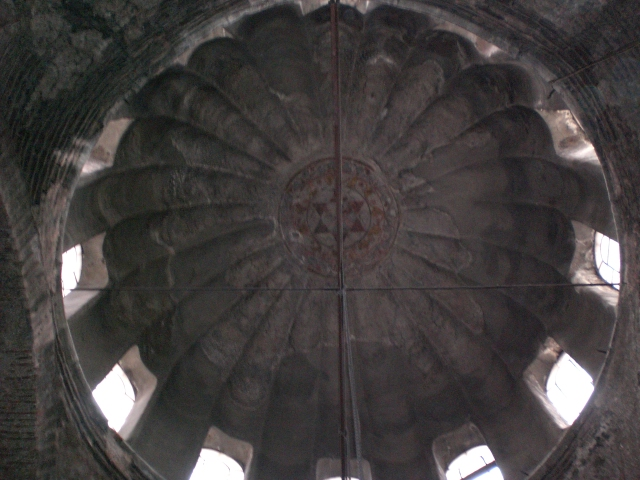
View of the dome interior

The main surviving structure is the large main church (katholikon), a modified cross-in-square church. The building measures 23 by 17 metres (75 by 56 ft) and is 17 metres (56 ft) high. On its southeastern corner, there is a brick decoration with an eagle motif. The narthex on the western side has been destroyed. Apart from the main entrance on the western side, there is a side door in the middle of the northern wall. The building shows extensive later repairs on the central apse and the prothesis, as well as the addition of four external buttresses. The roof is covered in lead sheets, as ordained by Isaac himself.

The interior space is dominated by the large dome on a twelve-sided base. Through a clever architectural arrangement that hides the dome supports in the main walls of the tabernacle and on two column pairs (possibly spolia), the interior is large and spacious, an effect enhanced by the many windows piercing the dome. The main dome is surrounded by four smaller ones on the corners of the building.

The 12th-century frescoes are an excellent example of the contemporary Constantinopolitan School. On the northern and southern walls are large representations of military saints, with features borrowed from Isaac's relatives of the Komnenos dynasty: his father Alexios I on the left on the northern side, and possibly his older brother Andronikos on the right; and his oldest brother John II Komnenos on the left left and Isaac himself on the right on the southern side. Surviving frescoes include representations of the Presentation of Jesus at the Temple, the Pentecost, the Communion of the Apostles, the Theotokos praying, prelates and prophets, and six-winged seraphs. The cover of Isaac's tomb survives, but its original location within the church is unknown.

== See also ==
- Eastern Orthodoxy in Greece
- Islam in Greece
- List of former mosques in Greece
- Ottoman Greece
- Ancient Roman and Byzantine domes
