= Thracia =

Roman province located in modern-day Turkey, Greece, and Bulgaria

Coordinates: 42°N 26°E

Provincia Thracia ἐπαρχία Θρᾳκῶν
- Province of the Roman Empire
- 46–314
- The province of Thracia within the Roman Empire, c. 125 AD
- Capital: Heraclea Perinthus (modern-day Marmara Ereğlisi, Turkey)
- Historical era: Classical antiquity
  - Annexation of Thracian client state: 46
  - Transformed into the Diocese of Thrace: 314
Preceded by	Succeeded by
Thracian Kingdom	Thrace (theme); Macedonia (theme)
- Today part of: Turkey; Greece; Bulgaria

Roman Empire under Hadrian (ruled 117–38), showing the imperial province of Thracia in southeastern Europe

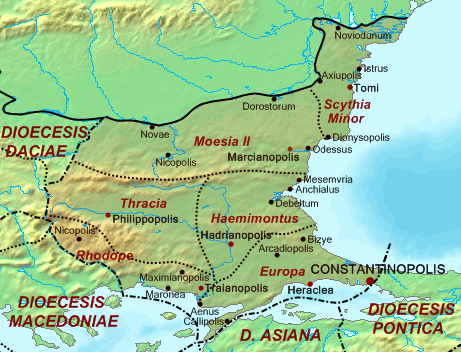
The Roman diocese of Thraciae

Thracia or Thrace (Latin: Thracia; Ancient Greek: Θρᾴκη, romanized: Thrakē) is the ancient name given to the southeastern Balkan region, the land inhabited by the Thracians. Thrace was ruled by the Odrysian kingdom during the Classical and Hellenistic eras, and briefly by the Greek Diadochi ruler Lysimachus, but became a client state of the late Roman Republic and early Roman Empire as the Sapaean kingdom. Roman emperor Claudius annexed the kingdom as a Roman province in 46 AD.

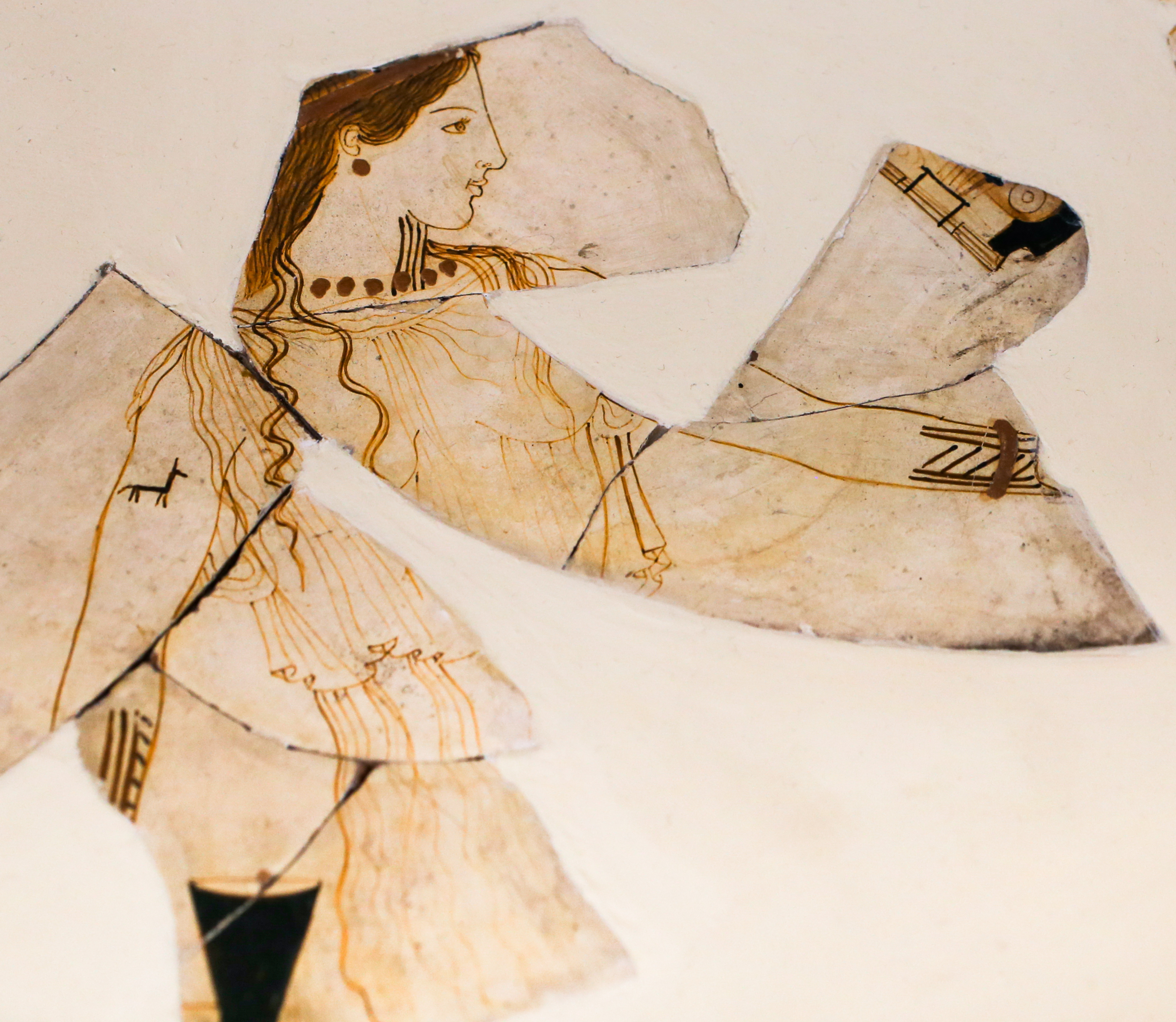
Greek vase painting showing a Thracian woman with tattooed arms, c. 470 BC

== Borders ==
From the perspective of classical Greece, Thracia included the territory north of Thessaly, with no definite boundaries, sometimes to the inclusion of Macedonia and Scythia Minor. Later, Thracia proper was understood to include the territory bordered by the Danube on the north, by the Black Sea on the east, by Macedonia in the south and by Illyria to the west, roughly equivalent with the territory of the Thracian kingdom as it stood during the 5th to 1st centuries BC.

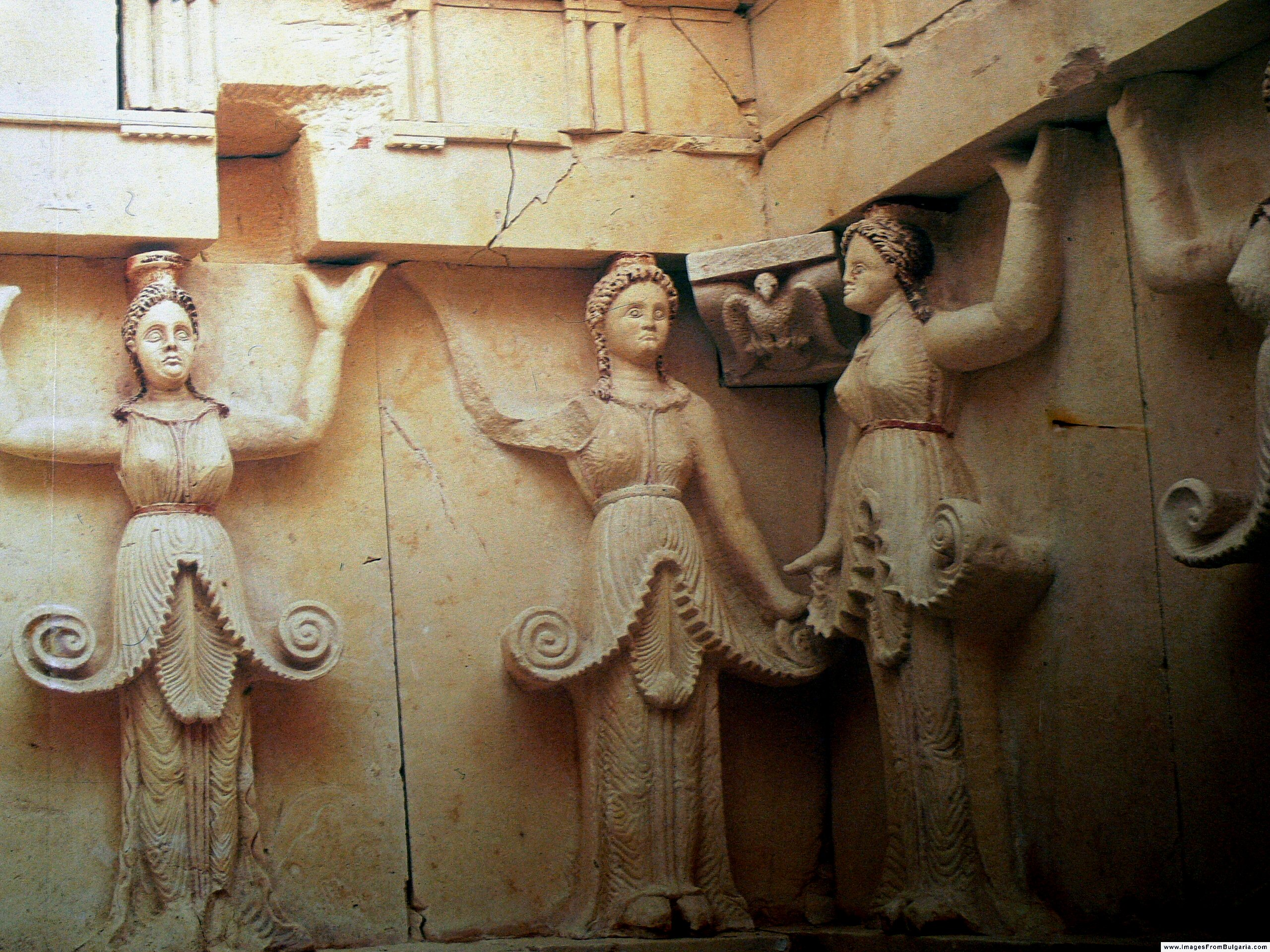
Caryatids of the Thracian Tomb of Sveshtari with skirts shaped like lotus flowers or acanthus leaves

With the annexation of the Thracian kingdom by the Roman Empire, by order of emperor Claudius, in AD 46, Thracia (formally provincia Thracia "Thracian province", ἐπαρχία Θρᾳκῶν "eparchy of the Thracians") was established as a Roman province. After the administrative reforms of the 3rd century, Thracia was reduced to the territory of the six small provinces of the Diocese of Thrace. Later still, the medieval Byzantine theme of Thracia contained only what today is Eastern Thrace.

== Under the Principate ==
The Odrysian kingdom of Thrace became a Roman client kingdom c. 20 BC, while the Greek city-states on the Black Sea coast came under Roman control as civitates foederatae ("allied" cities with internal autonomy). After the death of the Thracian king Rhoemetalces III in 46 AD and an unsuccessful anti-Roman revolt, the kingdom was annexed as the Roman province of Thracia.

The new province encompassed not only the lands of the former Odrysian realm, but also the north-eastern portion of the province of Macedonia as well as the islands of Thasos, Samothrace and Imbros in the Aegean Sea. To the north, Thracia bordered the province of Moesia Inferior; initially, the provincial boundary ran at a line north of the Haeumus Mountains, including the cities of Nicopolis ad Istrum and Marcianopolis in Thracia, but by the end of the 2nd century AD the border had moved south along the Haemus. The area of the Thracian Chersonese (modern Gallipoli Peninsula) was excluded from its governor's purview and administered as part of the emperor's personal domains. The province's first capital, where the Roman governor resided, was Heraclea Perinthus. Thracia was an imperial province, headed initially by a procurator, and, after c. 107/109, by a legatus Augusti pro praetore. Otherwise, the internal structure of the old Thracian kingdom was retained and only gradually superseded by Roman institutions. The old tribal-based strategiai ("generalcies"), headed by a strategos ("general"), were retained as the main administrative divisions, but some villages were grouped together into kōmarchiai ("village headships") or subordinated to neighbouring cities (the two Roman colonies of colonia Claudia Aprensis and colonia Flavia Pacis Deueltensium and several Greek cities, many of whom were founded by Trajan), which were set apart. In the mid-1st century, the strategiai numbered fifty, but the progressive expansion of the cities and the land assigned to them reduced their number: by the early 2nd century, they had decreased to fourteen, and c. 136 they were abolished altogether as official administrative divisions.

Septimius Severus (r. 193–211), frequently traveled through Thrace during his military campaigns from 193 to 198, first during his war with Pescennius Niger and later against the Parthians. The city of Perinthus, which backed Severus, was granted the prestigious title of neokoros twice, alongside the permission to hold crown festivals in his honor. Severus also allowed Anchialus to organize seuereia festivals, possibly as a reward for its support during the civil war.

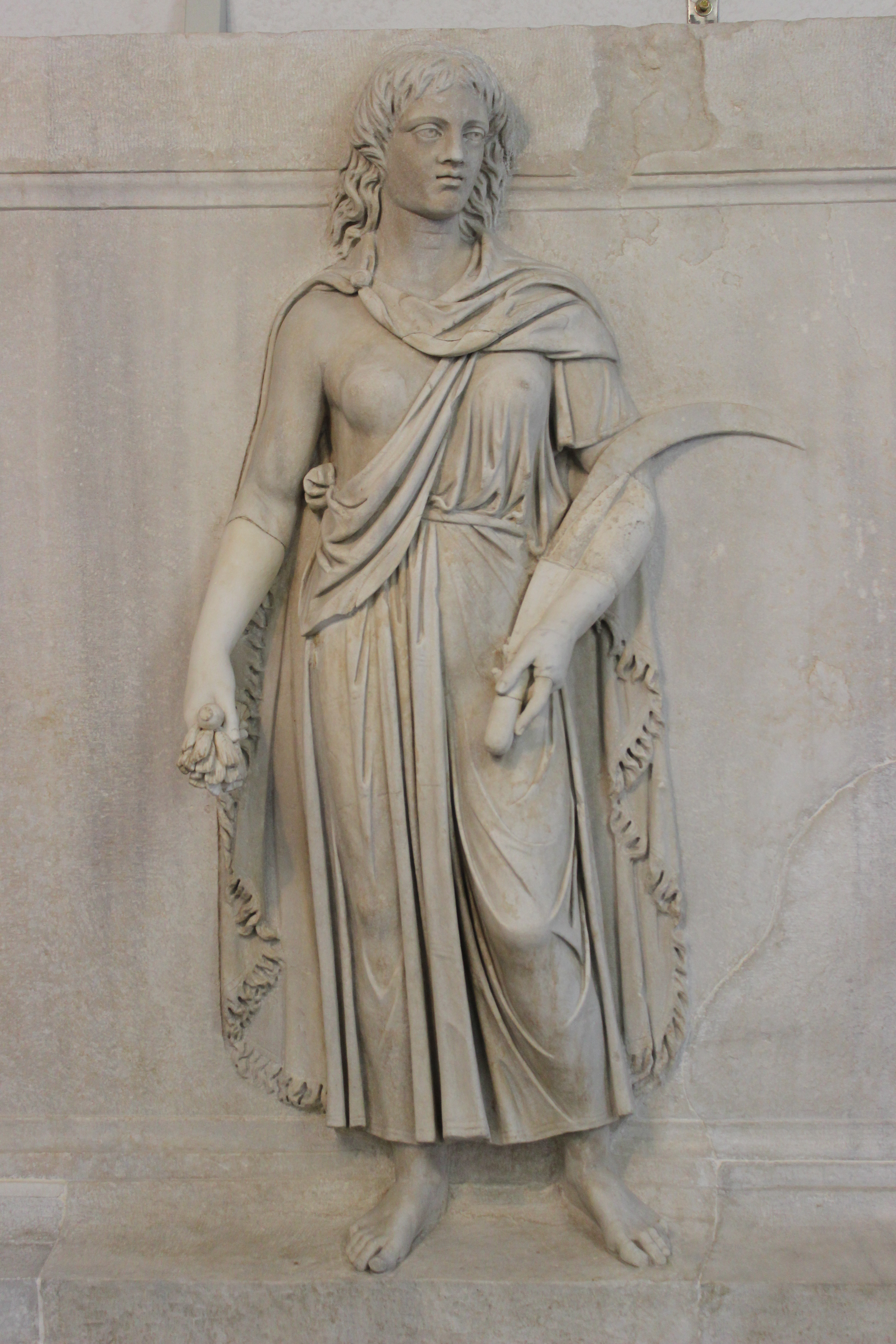
Thracia , the personification of the province of Thrace - from the Hadrianeum

As it was an interior province, far from the borders of the Empire, and having a major Roman road (Via Egnatia) that passed through the region, Thrace remained peaceful and prosperous until the Crisis of the Third Century, when it was repeatedly raided by Goths from beyond the Danube. During the campaigns to confront these raiders, Emperor Decius (r. 249–251) fell in the Battle of Abritus in 251. Thracia suffered especially heavily in the great Gothic seaborne raids of 268–270, and it was not until 271 that Emperor Aurelian (r. 270–275) was able to secure the Balkan provinces against Gothic raids for some time to come.

Generally, the provincial and urban policy of Roman emperors, with the foundation of several cities of Greek type (city-state), contributed more to the progress of Hellenization than to the Romanization of Thrace. So by the end of Roman antiquity, the phenomenon of Romanization occurs only upon the Lower Moesia, while Thrace lying south of the Haemus mountains had been almost completely Hellenized.

As regards the Thracian dispersion outside the borders (extra fines provinciae), from epigraphic evidence we know the presence of many Thracians (mostly soldiers) throughout the Roman Empire from Syria and Arabia to Britain.

== Late antiquity ==
Under the administrative reforms of Diocletian (r. 284–305), Thracia's territory was divided into four smaller provinces: Thracia, Haemimontus, Rhodope and Europa.

The new province of Thracia comprised the northwestern portion of the old province, i.e. the upper valley of the Hebrus river between Haemus and Rhodope and including Philippopolis (in Thracia), which had become the provincial capital in the early 3rd century. It was headed by a governor with the rank of consularis.

The four Thracian provinces, along with the two provinces of Moesia Inferior, were grouped into the diocese of Thraciae, which in turn was part of the Prefecture of the East. Militarily, the entire region was under the control of the magister militum per Thracias.

== See also ==
- Constantinople
- List of Roman governors of Thracia
- Thraco-Roman

== Sources ==
- Soustal, Peter (1991). Tabula Imperii Byzantini, Band 6: Thrakien (Thrakē, Rodopē und Haimimontos) (in German). Vienna: Verlag der Österreichischen Akademie der Wissenschaften. ISBN 3-7001-1898-8.
