= Rhodope (province) =

Roman province

Province of Rhodope Provincia Rhodopeia Ἐπαρχία Ῥοδόπης
- Province of the Roman Empire
- c. 293 – 7th century
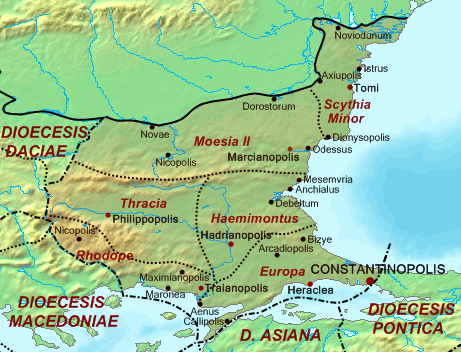
- Rhodope within the Diocese of Thrace c. 400.
- Capital: Trajanopolis
- Historical era: Late Antiquity
  - Diocletian's provincial reforms: c. 293
  - Slavic invasion of the Balkans: 7th century
- Today part of: Bulgaria; Greece

Rhodope (Greek: Ῥοδόπη) was a late Roman and early Byzantine province, situated on the northern Aegean coast. A part of the Diocese of Thrace, it extended along the Rhodope Mountains range, covering parts of modern Western Thrace (in Greece) and south-western Bulgaria. The province was headed by a governor of the rank of praeses, with Trajanopolis as the provincial capital. According to the 6th-century Synecdemus, there were six further cities in the province, Maroneia, Maximianopolis, Nicopolis, Kereopyrgos (unknown location) and Topeiros (mod. Toxotai in Greece).

The province survived until the Slavic invasions of the 7th century, although as an ecclesiastic province, it continued in existence at least until the 12th century. The theme of Boleron covered most of the area in later Byzantine times.

== Sources ==
- Kazhdan, Alexander, ed. (1991), Oxford Dictionary of Byzantium, Oxford University Press, p. 1793, ISBN 978-0-19-504652-6
- Soustal, Peter (1991). Tabula Imperii Byzantini, Band 6: Thrakien (Thrakē, Rodopē und Haimimontos) (in German). Vienna: Verlag der Österreichischen Akademie der Wissenschaften. ISBN 978-3-7001-1898-5.
