= Diocese of Thrace =

Diocese of the Roman Empire

Diocese of Thrace Dioecesis Thraciae Διοίκησις Θρᾴκης
- Diocese of the Roman Empire
- 314–535
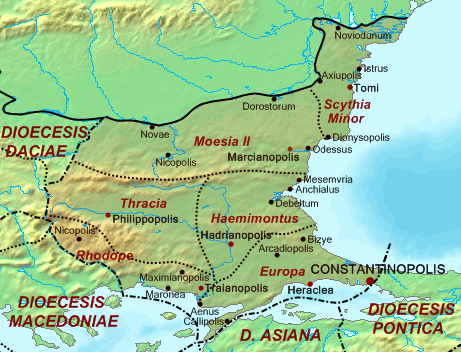
- The Diocese of Thrace c. 400.
- Capital: Philippopolis
- Historical era: Late Antiquity
  - Established: 314
  - Diocese abolished by emperor Justinian I: 535
- Today part of: Bulgaria; Greece; Turkey; Romania

The Diocese of Thrace (Latin: Dioecesis Thraciae, Greek: Διοίκησις Θρᾴκης) was a diocese of the later Roman Empire, incorporating the provinces of the eastern Balkan Peninsula (comprising territories in modern south-eastern Romania, central and eastern Bulgaria, and Greek and Turkish Thrace). Philippopolis (modern Plovdiv, in Bulgaria) was the capital.

The diocese was established as part of the reforms of Diocletian and Constantine the Great, and was headed by a vicarius subordinate to the praetorian prefecture of the East. As outlined in the Notitia Dignitatum of c. 400, the diocese included the provinces of Europa, Thracia, Haemimontus, Rhodope, Moesia II, and Scythia Minor.

In May 535, with Novel 26, Justinian I abolished the Diocese of Thrace. Its vicarius retained his rank of vir spectabilis and received the new title of praetor Justinianus, uniting in his hand both civil and military authority over the provinces of the former diocese, in a crucial departure from the strict separation of authority from the Diocletianian system. A year later, in May 536, the two Danubian provinces, Moesia Inferior and Scythia, were detached to form, along with other provinces, the quaestura exercitus.

== List of known Vicarii Thraciarum ==
- Aelius Claudius Dulcitius (?–361)
- Capitolinus (361–363)
- Andronicus (c. 366)
- Philoxenus (c. 392)
- Solomon (?–582)

== Sources ==
- Bury, John Bagnell (1958) [1923]. History of the Later Roman Empire: From the Death of Theodosius I to the Death of Justinian, Volume 2. Mineola, New York: Dover Publications. OCLC 41478187.
