= Loutros, Evros =

Loutros Λουτρός
- Community
- Location within Greece
- Coordinates: 40°53′N 26°03′E
- Country: Greece
- Administrative region: East Macedonia and Thrace
- Regional unit: Evros
- Municipality: Alexandroupoli
- Municipal unit: Traianoupoli

Population (2021)
  - Community: 595
- Time zone: UTC+2 (EET)
  - Summer (DST): UTC+3 (EEST)

Loutros (Greek: Λουτρός) is a village and a community in the southern part of the Evros regional unit in Greece. It is part of the municipal unit of Traianoupoli. Its population in 2021 was 595 for the community, including the villages Loutra Traianoupoleos (thermal baths) and Pefka. It is located on a small river between low hills, east of Alexandroupoli, on the edge of the coastal plains of the Aegean Sea.

== Population ==
Year	Village population	Community population
1912	160	-
1981	1,367	-
1991	1,223	-
2001	1,049	1,148
2011	713	769
2021	548	595

== See also ==
- List of settlements in the Evros regional unit
