= Metropolis of Alexandroupolis, Traianoupolis and Samothrace =

Holy Metropolis of Alexandroupolis, Traianoupoli, and Samothrace

Orthodox
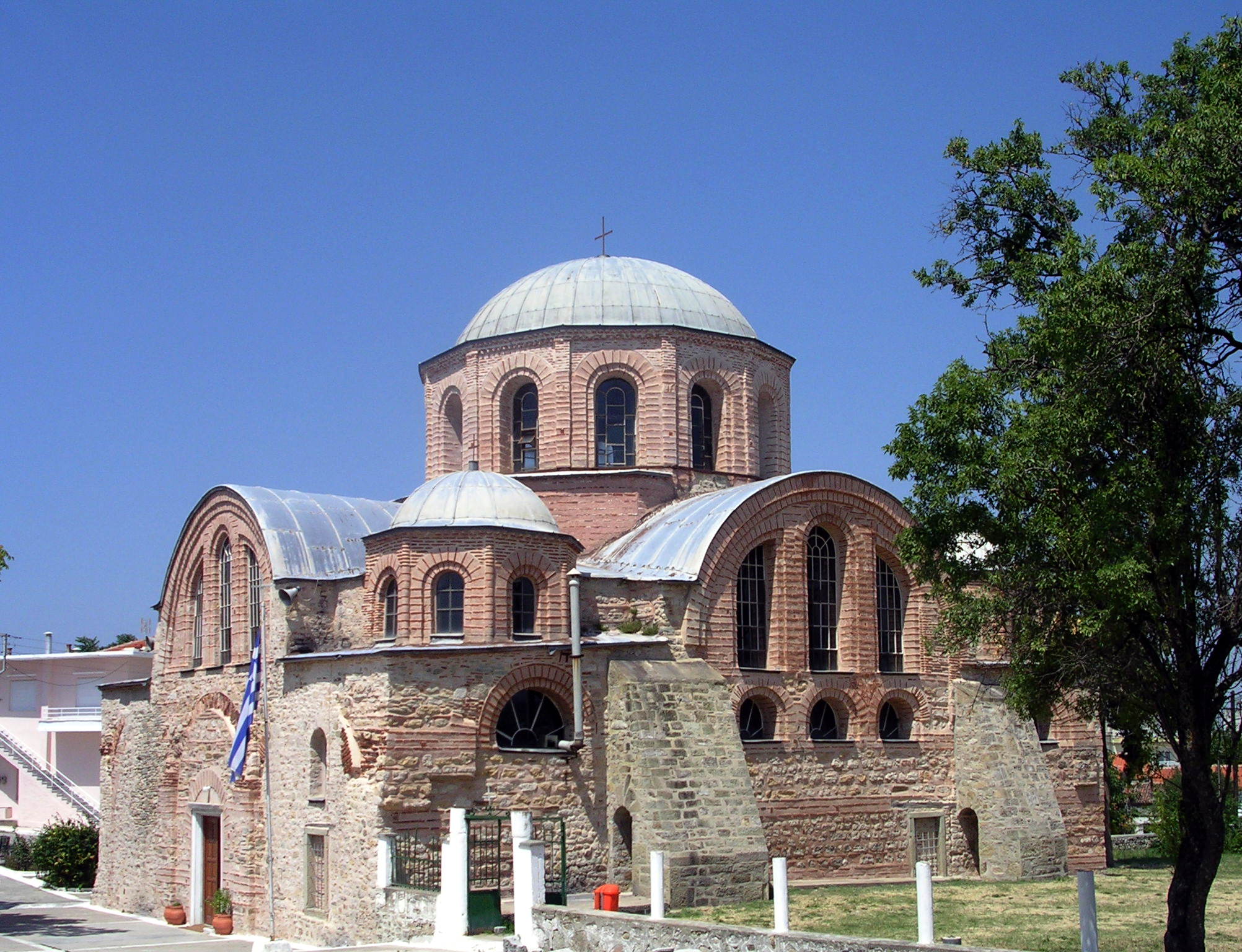
- Monastery of Panagia Kosmosotira in Ferres

Location
- Country: Greece
- Headquarters: Alexandroupolis

Statistics
- Parishes: 61

Information
- Denomination: Eastern Orthodox
- Rite: Byzantine Rite
- Established: 1922 AD
- Cathedral: Saint Nicholas of Alexandroupoli
- Language: Greek

Current leadership
- Parent church: Ecumenical Patriarchate of Constantinople and Church of Greece
- Governance: Episcopal
- Patriarch: Bartholomew I of Constantinople
- Metropolitan: Anthimos Koukouridis

Website
- https://imalex.gr/

The Holy Metropolis of Alexandroupolis, Traianoupoli, and Samothrace (Greek: Ιερά Μητρόπολις Αλεξανδρουπόλεως, Τραϊανουπόλεως και Σαμοθράκης) is a diocese of the Greek Orthodox Church, with its seat in Alexandroupolis in western Thrace. It currently has 61 parishes and 2 monasteries. Since 2004, its current Metropolitan is Anthimos Koukouridis.

== History ==
Christianity first arrived in western Thrace in at least 161 AD, with the arrival of Saint Glyceria in Traianoupoli. Traianoupoli (near modern day Didymoteicho) served as an important center of early Christians until at least 305 AD, during the Great Persecution in which its first bishop Alexander of Traianoupoli was martyred on orders by Diocletian. The first historically attested bishop of Traianoupoli, Theodoulos, was characterized as a "good and orthodox man" who fought against the Arians. Since the 5th century, the diocese was elevated to Metropolis status, where it stayed at that status until at least 879 during the reign of Leo VI the Wise. After the destruction of Traianoupoli, the seat of the diocese was moved to Ainos and diminished to an exarchate. It was briefely reelevated to Metropolitan status sometime between 1341 and 1351, and in 1646 when it was permanently reelevated to Metropolitan status. In 1885, it absorbed parts of the nearby Metropolis of Maroneia, including what would now be Alexandroupolis.

The diocese as is today was created as a result of the Treaty of Lausanne on November 17, 1922 by synodal decision during the reign of Patriarch Melitios IV Metaxakis due to the influx of Greek refugees from Asia minor, many of which were Pontic Greeks including its first bishop Gervasios (Sarasitis). On June 5, 1934 it was expanded to include Samothrace which at the time was part of the metropolis of Maroneia.

== Bishops ==
- Gervasios (Sarasitis) (1922 - 1934)
- Ioakeim (Kaviris) (1934 - 1966)
- Constantios (Chronis) (1967 - 1974)
- Anthimos (Roussas) (1974 - 2004)
- Anthimos (Koukourides) (2005–present)
