= List of Roman governors of Thracia =

This is a list of the Roman governors of Thracia.

Date	Name
between 69 and 79	Lucius Venuleius Pataecius (equestrian procurator)
between 85 and 95	Tiberius Claudius Sacerdos Julianus (equestrian procurator)
before 110	Prifernius Paetus Memmus Apollinaris (equestrian procurator)
109-112	Publius Juventius Celsus (propraetorian legate)
112-114	Titus Statilius Maximus Severus Hadrianus (propraetorian legate)
114-116	Gnaeus [...] (propraetorian legate)
116-118	Aulus Platorius Nepos (propraetorian legate)
123-126	Quintus Tineius Rufus (propraetorian legate)
c. 131 – 132	? Agrippa (propraetorian legate)
135-136	Cavarius Fronto (propraetorian legate)
138	Julius Crassipes (propraetorian legate)
138-139	Gaius Rubrius Vinicius Porcius? Marcellus (propraetorian legate)
between 129 and 137	Publius [...] (propraetorian legate)
between 118 and 139	Maec. Nepos (propraetorian legate)
c. 142	Marcus Antonius Zeno
c. 143 – c. 146	Gaius Fabius Agrippinus
c. 146 – c. 149	Marcus Pontius Sabinus
c. 149 – c. 152	Gaius Gallonius Fronto Quintus Marcius Turbo
c. 152 – c. 155	Gaius Julius Commodus Orfitianus
c. 155 – c. 158	Lucius Pompeius Vopiscus
c. 158 – c. 161	Lucius Pullaienus Gargilius Antiquus
c. 161 – c. 164	Appius Claudius Martialis
c. 164 – c. 167	Quintus Tullius Maximus
after 167	? Caerellius Priscus
c. 172 – c. 174	Gaius Pantuleius Graptiacus
c. 174 – c. 177	Asellius Aemilianus
c. 177 – c. 180	Claudius Bellicus
after 180	Aemilius Just[us/inus]
184 or 185	P. (?) Julius Castus
186-187	Caecilius Maternus
c. 188 – c. 189	Gnaeus Suellius Rufus Marcianus
c. 192	Quintus Caecilius Secundus Servilianus
between 190 and 193	Tiberius Claudius Attalus Paterculianus
196-198	Titus Statilius Barbarus
before 198	Caelius Oneratus
198	Gaius Caecina Largus
202	Quintus Sicinius Clarus Po[ntianus?]
208	Quintus Egnatius Proculus
between 198 and 213	Fl(avius) Claudianus
between 198 and 217	[...]ius Pudens
between 198 and 217	Quintus Atrius Clonius
between 227 and 229	Rutilius Pudens Crispinus
between 222 and 235	Marcus Ulpius Senecio Saturninus
between 238 and 241	Lucius Catius Celer
?244	Severianus
c. 244/245	Coresnius Marcellus
c. 245 – 247	Sextus Furnius Publianus
c. 247 – 248	Gaius Vibius Gallus
248/249 – 251	Titus Julius Priscus
