= Plotinopolis =

Plotinopolis (Greek: Πλωτινούπολις) is an ancient city founded in Thrace by the Roman emperor Trajan and named after his wife, Pompeia Plotina. In the 6th/7th centuries, it was replaced by the nearby city of Didymoteichon.

== History ==
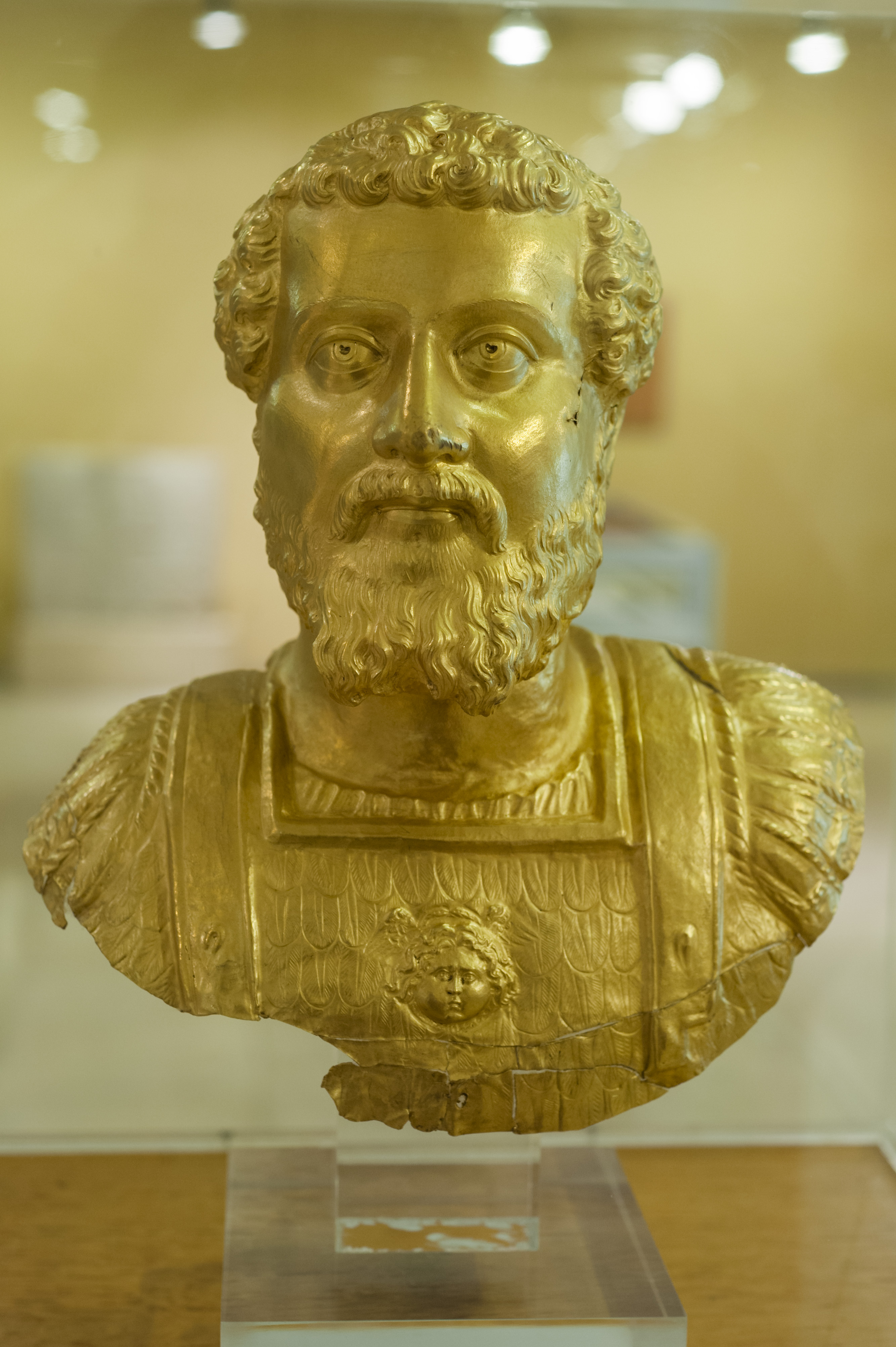
The golden bust of Plotinopolis.

In the early 2nd century, the Roman emperor Trajan created a new city on the banks of the Hebrus River, between two surrounding hills, near modern Turkish Uzunköprü and much older Greek Didymoteicho (Demotika), and named it Plotinopolis, after his wife Pompeia Plotina. A solid gold bust of Emperor Septimius Severus found on the site of Plotinopolis in 1965 is now in the museum at Komotini.

The city would later be one of the most important towns in Thrace, having its own assembly, part of the late Roman province of Haemimontus, and had an episcopal see (suffragan of the Metropolis of Adrianople).

The first bishop of the city, Hierophilus, is mentioned in the 430s. In the 6th century, Emperor Justinian I improved the fortifications of Plotinopolis. It was probably at that time that the nearby rocky and more defensible hill was also fortified. It seems that already in the 7th century, the latter had become the core of the settlement, which was thereafter named Didymoteichon ("twin wall").

The name "Plotinopolis" survived in the ecclesiastical registers until the 9th century, before there too it was replaced by Didymoteichon.

== Catholic titular diocese ==
The diocese of Plotinopolis was established 1933 as a Latin Catholic titular bishopric. It only had a single incumbent: Pavlo Vasylyk (1991.01.16 – 1993.04.20), while auxiliary bishop of Ivano-Frankivsk of the Ukrainians.
