= Haemimontus =

Roman and Byzantine province

Province of Haemimontus Provincia Haemimonti ἐπαρχία Αἱμίμοντου
- Province of the Roman Empire
- c. 293 – 640s
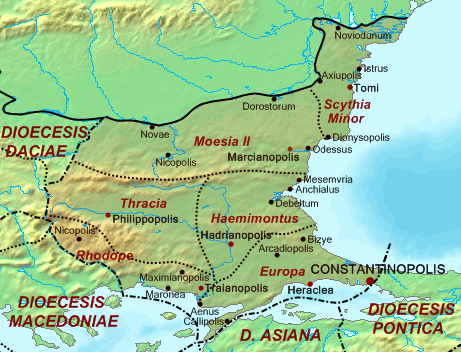
- Haemimontus within the Diocese of Thrace c. 400.
- Capital: Adrianople
- Historical era: Late Antiquity
  - Diocletian's provincial reforms: c. 293
  - Thematic reforms: 640s
Succeeded by
Theme of Thrace
- Today part of: Bulgaria; Greece; Turkey

Haemimontus (Greek: Αἱμίμοντος) was a late Roman and early Byzantine province, situated in northeastern Thrace. It was subordinate to the Diocese of Thrace and to the praetorian prefecture of the East. Its capital was Adrianople, and it was headed by a praeses. In the 5th century, Epiphanius in a report mentions a three dioceses within the province; the Diocese of Adrianopolis, the Diocese of Plotinoupolis and an unnamed third diocese.

The province was superseded by the Theme of Thrace during the 7th century, and later by the Theme of Macedonia after 8th century. However, the name Haemimontus survived as an Orthodox ecclesiastical metropolis until late Byzantine times.

== Honours ==
Hemimont Plateau in Graham Land, Antarctica is named after the province.

== Sources ==
- Soustal, Peter (1991). Tabula Imperii Byzantini, Band 6: Thrakien (Thrakē, Rodopē und Haimimontos) (in German). Vienna: Verlag der Österreichischen Akademie der Wissenschaften. pp. 47–49, 63, 126–128. ISBN 978-3-7001-1898-5.
