= Mosynopolis =

Ancient settlement and archaeological site near Komotini, Greece

- Μοσυνόπολις (Ancient Greek)
- Maximianopolis
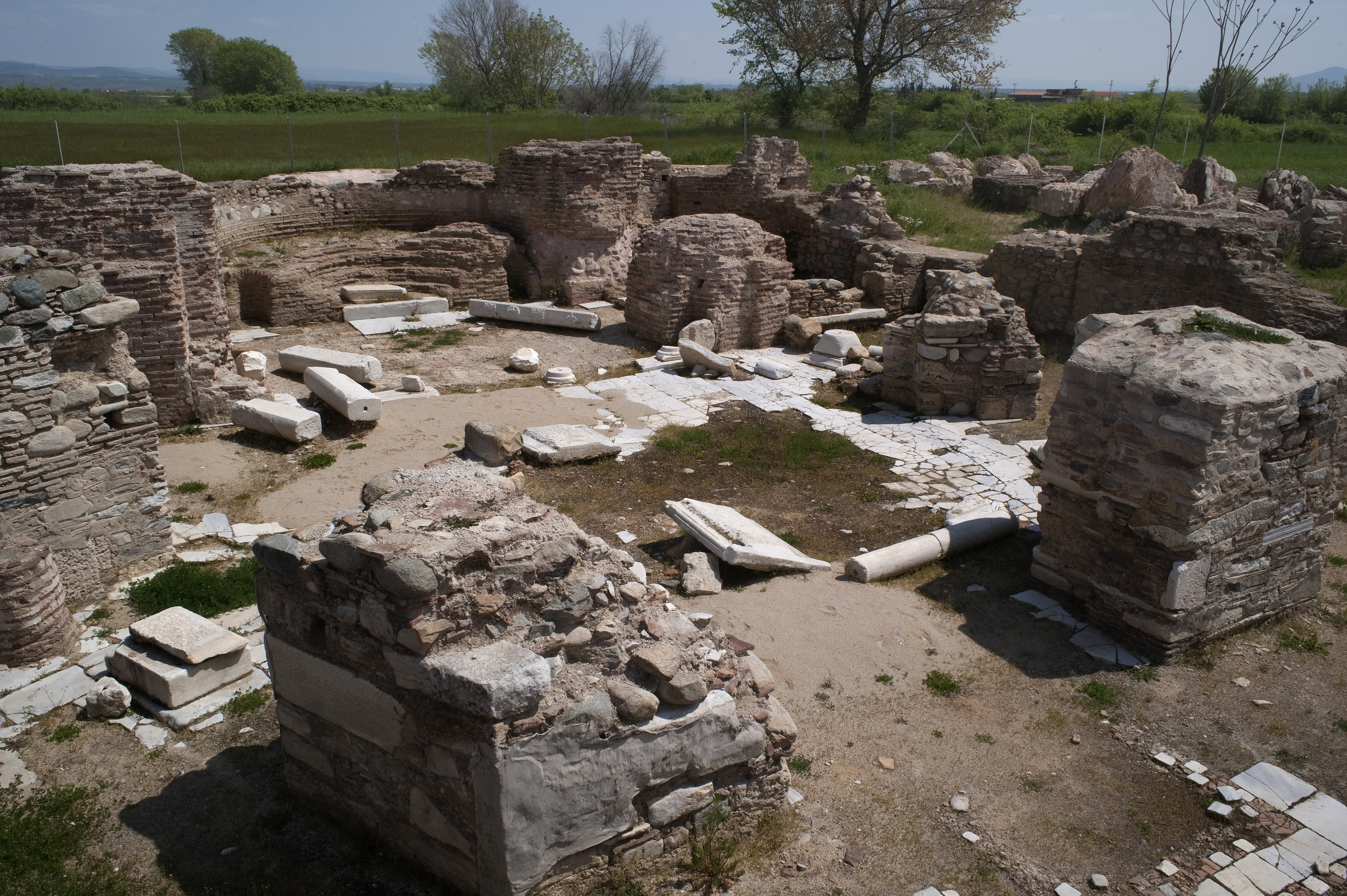
- A central plan church in Mosynopolis

- Location within Greece
- 41°07′43″N 25°19′31″E
- Type: Settlement
- Cultures: Roman, Byzantine
- Location: Near Komotini, Greece
- Region: Thrace

History
- Abandoned: 13th century

Site notes
- Condition: In ruins

Mosynopolis (Greek: Μοσυνόπολις) was a city in the Roman province of Rhodope, which was known until the 9th century as Maximianopolis (Μαξιμιανούπολις) or, to distinguish it from other cities of the same name, as Maximianopolis in Rhodope. Only ruins now remain in Greek Thrace.

== History ==
The city of Maximianopolis appears in written sources from the 4th century on. Its fortifications were renewed by Byzantine emperor Justinian I, and it was later a base for operations by Emperor Basil II in his wars against the Bulgarians.

In the 11th century, the city was the center of a district (bandon) in the theme of Boleron, and Anna Komnene reports in her Alexiad that there were many Manichaeans living in Mosynopolis in the late 11th/early 12th centuries. The town was captured in 1185 by the Normans, while the monk Ephrem says that the city was captured in 1190 by Frederick I, Holy Roman Emperor. The Battle of Messinopolis, in which the Bulgarians defeated Boniface I, Marquess of Montferrat, took place nearby in 1207, and was speedily followed by the destruction of Mosynopolis by Tsar Kaloyan of Bulgaria.

The fate of the town thereafter is somewhat obscure: it re-appears in 1317 as part of the theme of "Boleron and Mosynopolis", and its bishopric was still active, but the historian Catherine Asdracha, in her 1972 survey of the Rhodope area in the late Middle Ages, suggests that it never recovered from Kaloyan's sack and remained in ruins, proposing that it is to be identified with the town of Mesene, which the emperor and historian John VI Kantakouzenos reported as "destroyed many years ago".

The town at some point had other names including Porsula or Porsulae, Corsulae, Impara and Pyrsoalis,

== Ecclesiastical history ==
Bishops of Maximianopolis in Rhodope were present at the 5th and 6th-century ecumenical councils of Ephesus (431), Chalcedon (451), and Constantinople II (553) and in another council of 459.

From the 7th to the 9th centuries, the see is referred to as archiepiscopal, giving it autocephalous status.

In all these instances, the see appears under the name Maximianopolis, but in 879 it is under the name Mosynopolis that it is represented by a bishop called Paul at the Fourth Council of Constantinople. From the following century to the 12th, it appears with reduced status as a suffragan of Trajanopolis in Rhodope.

In the 13th century it became a Latin bishopric.

The see is mentioned under the name Mosynopolis also in the Notitiae Episcopatuum of Leo the Wise, about 900; in that for 940; in that for 1170 under the name of Misinoupolis.

After the destruction of the city, the Patriarchate of Constantinople in August 1347 authorized the Metropolitan of Trajanopolis to exercise jurisdiction in what had been the see of Maximianopolis or Mosynopolis.

=== Titular see ===
The bishopric is included in the Catholic Church's list of titular sees both as an archiepiscopal see under the name Maximianopolis in Rhodope and as a suffragan diocese of Mosynopolis subject to Trajanopolis in Rhodope.

The diocese was nominally restored in 1933 as the Latin Catholic titular archbishopric Massimianopolis in Rhodope.

It is vacant, having had a single incumbent of the intermediary (archiepiscopal) rank:

- Adam Hefter (5 December 1939 – 9 January 1970), previously Bishop of Gurk (Austria) (26 December 1914 – 4 May 1939) and Titular Bishop of Marciana (4 May 1939 – 5 December 1939)

== Photographs ==
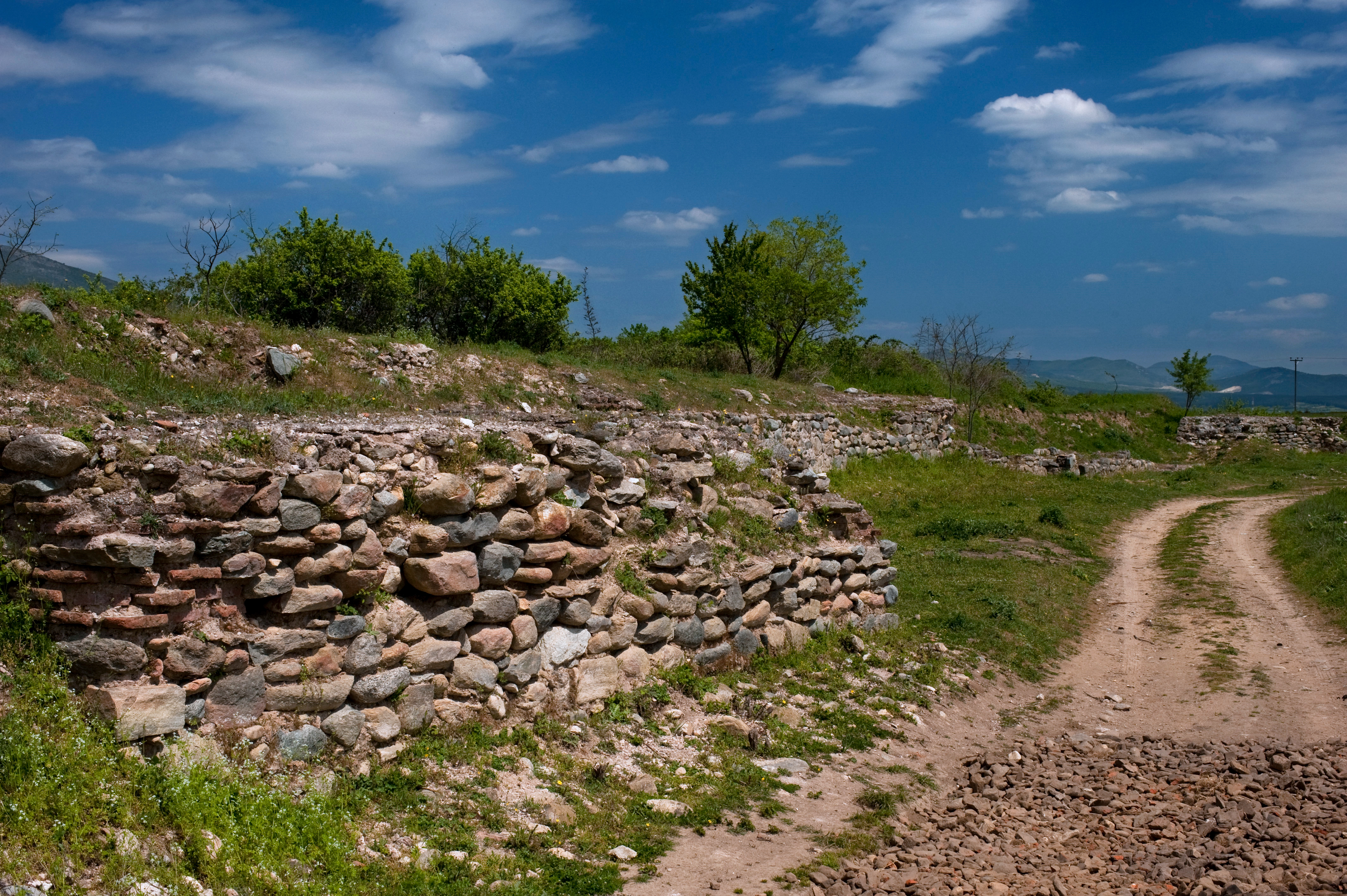
Fortress: a little south from the church.

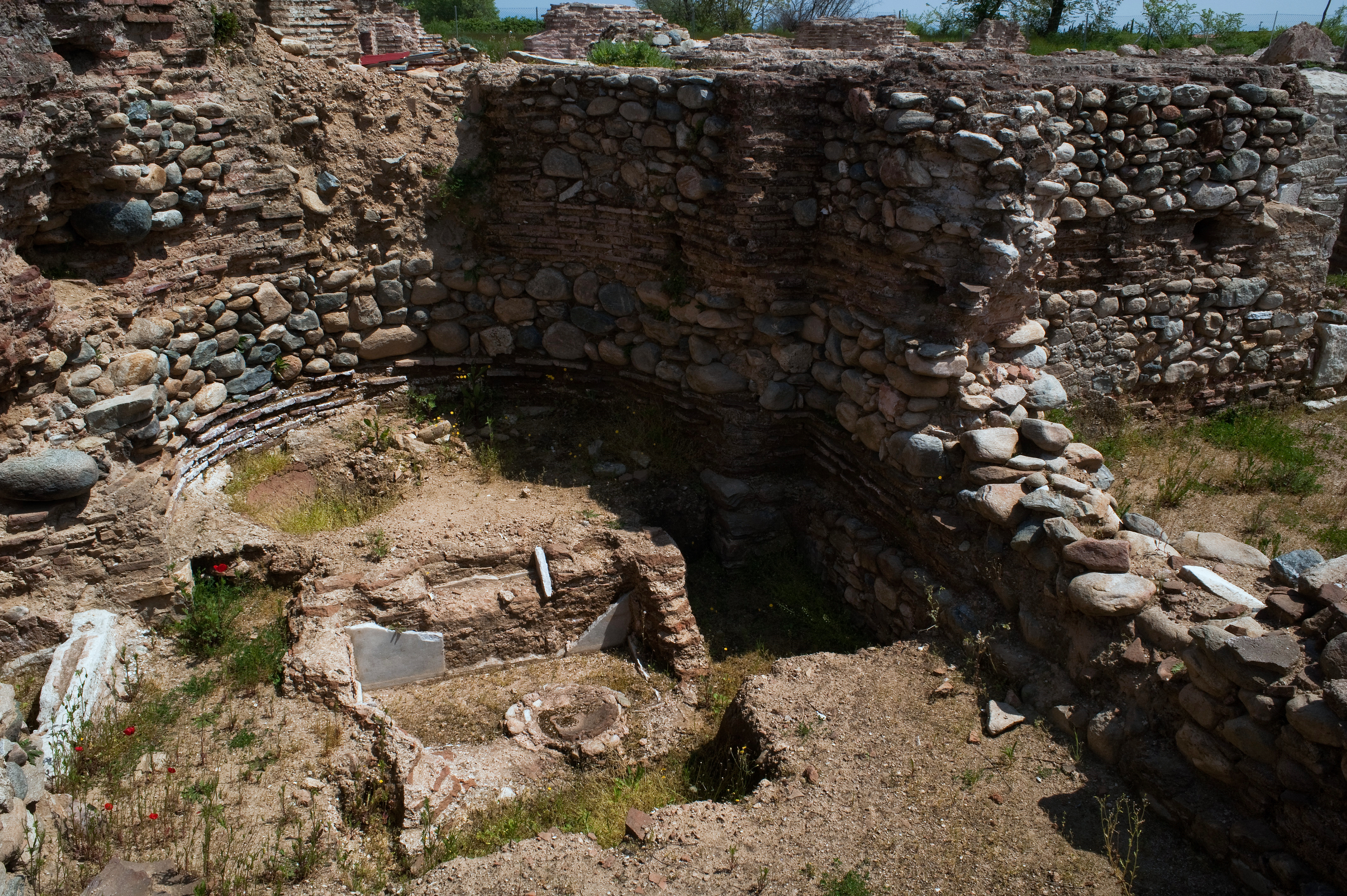
A central plan church.

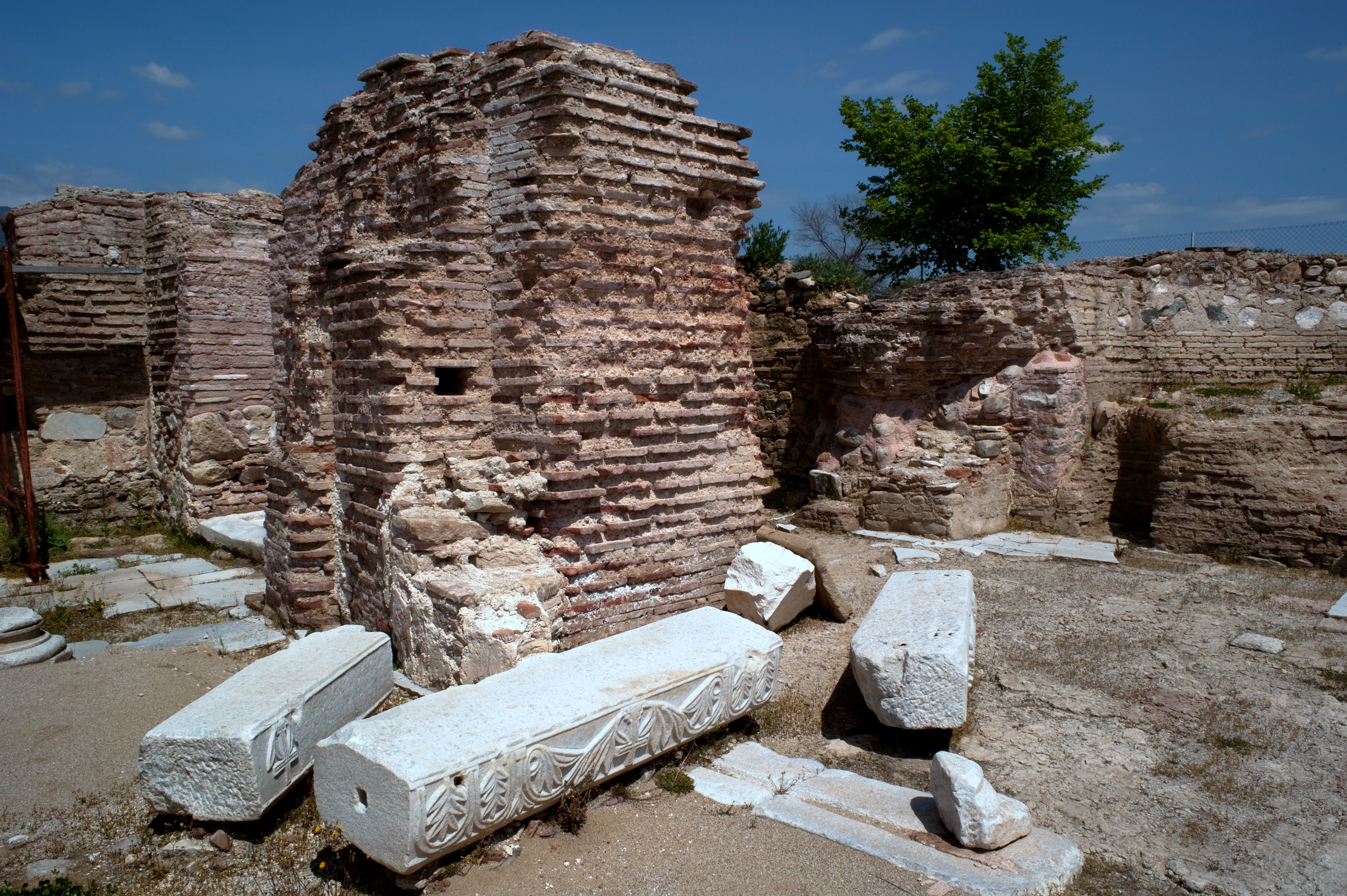
A central plan church.

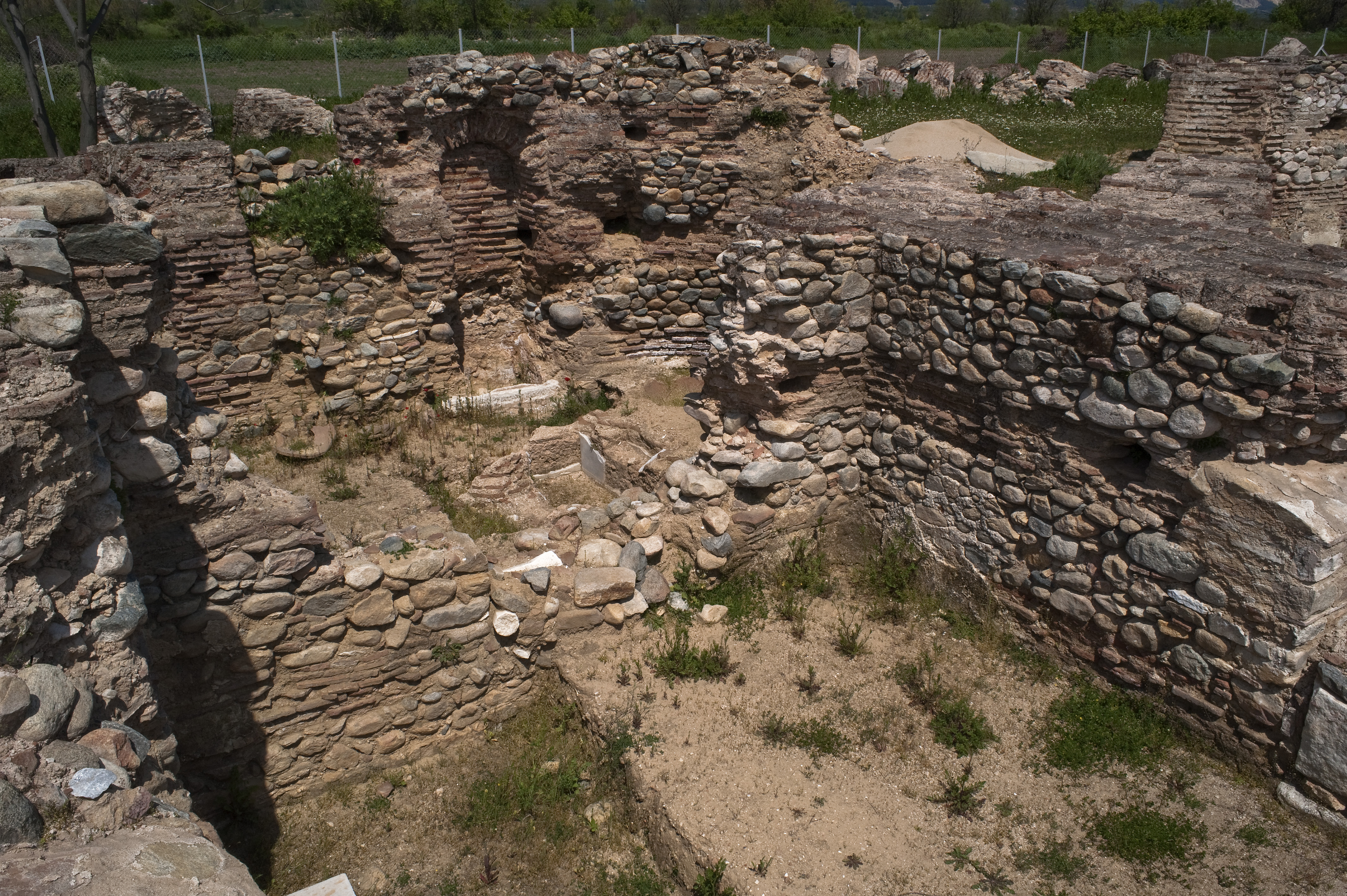
A central plan church.

== See also ==
- Maximianopolis (disambiguation)
