= Traianoupoli =

Traianoupoli Τραϊανούπολη
- Municipal unit
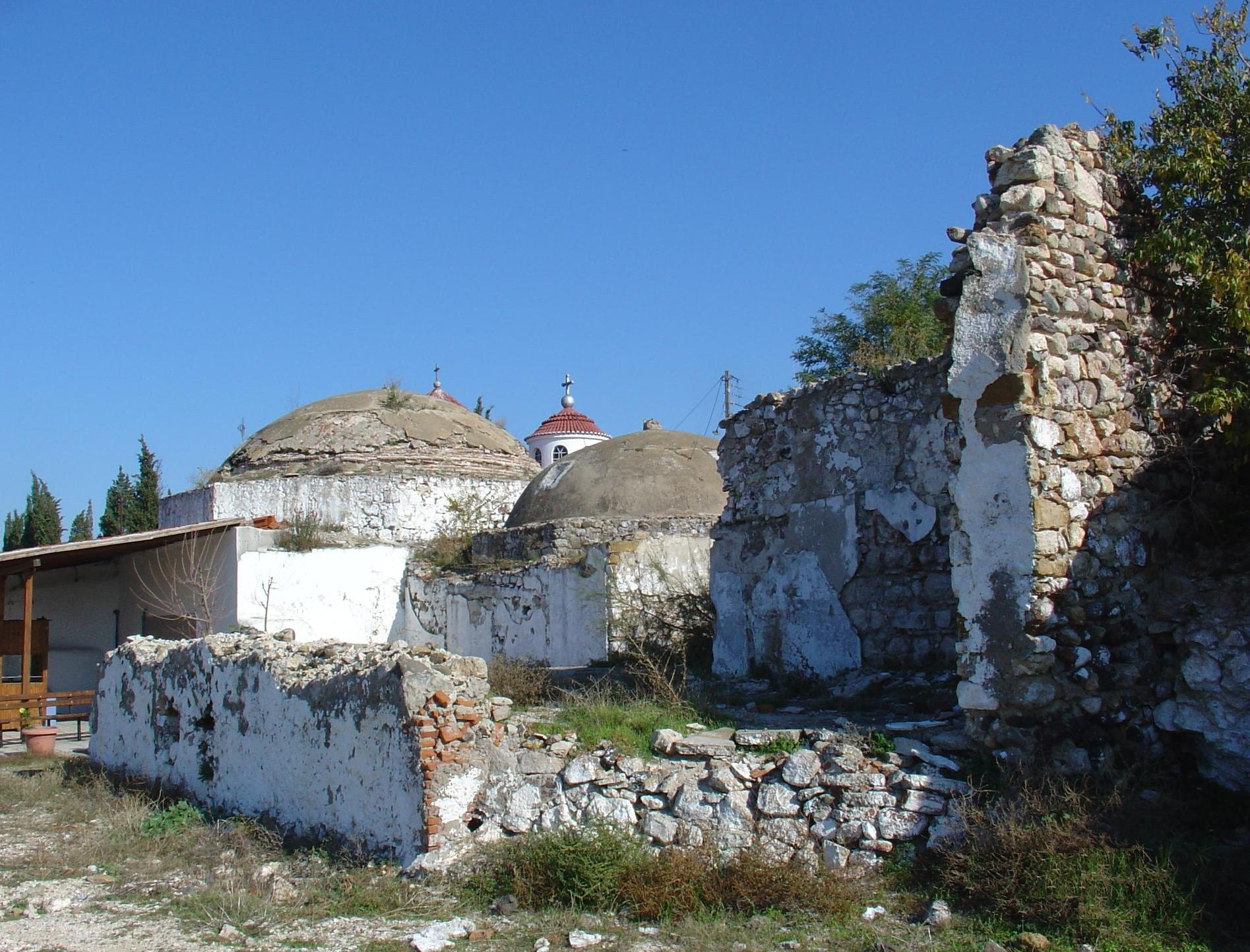
- The ruins of four baths of the Roman and Ottoman period

- Location within the regional unit

- Location within Greece
- Coordinates: 40°52′N 26°02′E
- Country: Greece
- Administrative region: East Macedonia and Thrace
- Regional unit: Evros
- Municipality: Alexandroupolis

Area
  - Municipal unit: 163.5 km^{2} (63.1 sq mi)
- Elevation: 58 m (190 ft)

Population (2021)
  - Municipal unit: 2,315
  - Municipal unit density: 14.16/km^{2} (36.67/sq mi)
- Time zone: UTC+2 (EET)
  - Summer (DST): UTC+3 (EEST)
- Vehicle registration: EB

Traianoupoli (Greek: Τραϊανούπολη) or Traianopolis in Thrace, Trajanopolis or Trajanople was a medieval settlement in the 14th century in the Evros regional unit of East Macedonia and Thrace region, northeastern Greece, nowadays named Loutra Traianoupoleos.

Traianoupoli was also the name of a municipality which existed between 1997 and 2011 following the Kapodistrias Plan.

== Modern town ==
Since the 2011 local government reform it is part of the municipality Alexandroupolis, of which it is a municipal unit. The municipal unit has an area of 163.549 km^{2}. Population 2,315 (2021).

The seat of the municipality was in Antheia.

=== Subdivisions ===
The municipal unit Traianoupoli is subdivided into the following communities (constituent villages given in parentheses):

- Antheia (Antheia, Aristino)
- Doriko (Doriko, Aetochori)
- Loutros (Loutros, Loutra Traianopouleos, Pefka)
- Nipsa

== History ==
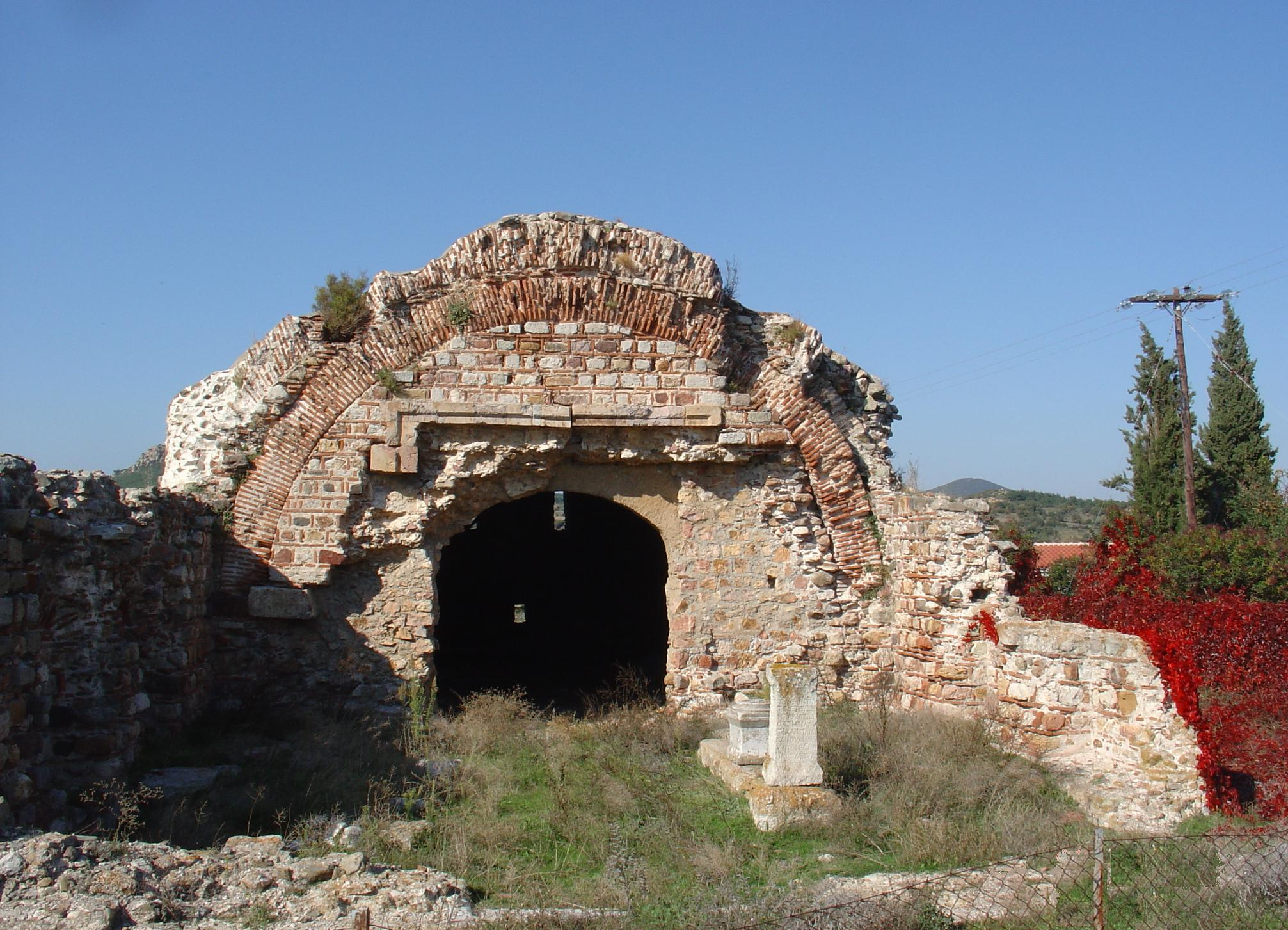
Hana is an impressive baths building of the Roman period, renovated by the Ottoman Gazi Evrenos.

The city was founded by the Roman emperor Trajan (r. 98–117) near the ancient town of Doriscus, and received his name. In the Roman period, the city was famous for its baths.

In the 4th century, it became the capital and metropolitan see of the Thracian Roman province of Rhodope. Under Justinian I (r. 527–565) the city walls were repaired. The city remained the metropolis of the ecclesiastical province of Rhodope until its decline in the 14th century, when it ceased being a provincial capital with the rise of the theme system. It was restructured under the Theme of Macedonia, although a single strategos of Traianoupolis is attested in an 11th-century seal. In autumn 1077, the troops of the rebel general Nikephoros Bryennios the Elder proclaimed him emperor at Trajanople.

In the Partitio Romaniae of 1204, it is listed as the pertinentia de Macri et Traianopoli. The Crusader Geoffrey of Villehardouin is known to have been assigned fiefs in the area. In 1205 or 1207, the town was destroyed by Tsar Kaloyan of Bulgaria, but in 1210 it is attested as a Latin (Roman Catholic) archbishopric. Following its recovery by the Empire of Nicaea, the Greek Orthodox see was restored; in 1260, John Kondoumnes was named as its bishop. The area was ravaged by Bulgarian raids in 1322 and by Turkish raids in 1329/30. By the time John Kantakouzenos and his ally, Umur Bey, erected their camp on the site in the winter of 1343/44, the city had lain destroyed and abandoned for several years. In 1347, the local metropolitan was therefore allowed to reside in Mosynopolis instead. The area fell to the Ottoman Turks by 1365, and in 1371 the see was supplanted by that of Serres in the ecclesiastical hierarchy.

The sole use of the site after the city's abandonment was as a way-station, and in ca. 1375/85, the Ottoman Gazi Evrenos built an inn (Hana) and a hammanm (bathhouse), which still survives today; traces of the medieval buildings and the circuit wall also have survived.

The area came under Bulgarian rule after the Balkan Wars of 1912–13 until it was ceded to Greece in the Treaty of Neuilly in 1919.

== Ecclesiastical history ==
=== Residential see ===
Trajanopolis was an episcopal see at least since the time of Constantius II (r. 337–361), when its bishop Theodulus was persecuted by the Arians. By the end of the century, it had become the metropolis of the ecclesiastical province of Rhodope, a position it retained throughout its existence until the 14th century. Its suffragan sees were originally Ainos, Didymoteichon, Makri, Maroneia, Mosynopolis, Perberis, Anastasioupolis-Peritheorion, Polystylon, Poroi, Topeiros and Xantheia.

A bishop Syncletius is attested ca. 400, and several the metropolitans are attested thereafter in various church councils: Peter took part in the Council of Ephesus in 431, Basil in the "Robber Council" of 449 and the Council of Chalcedon in 451, John in the church council of 459, Eleusinius in the Fifth Ecumenical Council of 553, Tiberius in the Quinisext Council of 691/2, Leo in the Second Council of Nicaea in 787, Nicephorus in the Fourth Council of Constantinople in 879, and George in the council of 997. John, Metropolitan of Anastasiopolis, was also administrator (proedros) of Trajanopolis in 1285, but in the early 14th century the see fell vacant. Patriarch Nephon I of Constantinople assumed direct control over its revenues in 1310–14, and in 1315 the vacant see was granted for life to Patriarch John XIII of Constantinople.

The city was largely destroyed and abandoned after the raids of the 1320s, so that in 1347, the metropolitan moved his residence to Mosynopolis. In 1353, the incumbent metropolitan was assigned the Metropolis of Peritheorion as well. Following the Ottoman conquest shortly after, in 1365 the dispossessed Metropolitan was moved to the Metropolis of Lacedaemon. In 1371 the see of Serres replaced Trajanopolis in the ecclesiastical hierarchy of the Patriarchate of Constantinople.

The title of Metropolitan of Trajanopolis remained a titular appointment in the Church of Constantinople until 1885, when it was assigned to the Metropolis of Ainos (full title "Ainos, Trajanopolis, and Dede-Agatch"). From 1922, with the establishment of the Metropolis of Alexandroupolis within the modern Greek state, the title passed to it; the full title of the metropolitans of Alexandroupolis is "Metropolitan of Alexandroupolis, Trajanopolis and Samothrace", with the style of "hypertimos and exarch of Rhodope".

=== Catholic titular see ===
The diocese was nominally restored as a Latin Catholic Metropolitan titular archbishopric in the 17th century, simply as Traianopolis (or Trajanopolis), which was changed in 1933 to Trajanopolis in Rhodope (since 1970 spelled Traianopolis in Rhodope), avoiding confusion with a Turkish namesake.

It is vacant since 1968, having had the following incumbents, all except the first (merely episcopal, the lowest rank) of the highest (Metropolitan) rank :

- Titular Bishop Claudio de Villagómez (1684-04-24 – 1685-11-04?)
- Titular Archbishop Deodat Bogdan Nersesowicz (1701-07-18 – 1709)
- Titular Archbishop Nicolò Paolo Andrea Coscia (later Cardinal) (1724-06-26 – 1725-06-11)
- Titular Archbishop Carlo Pignatelli (1725-07-23 – ?)
- Titular Archbishop Francesco Scipione Maria Borghese (later Cardinal) (1728-03-08 – 1729-07-06)
- Titular Archbishop Pietro de Carolis (1729-09-07 – 1744-11-27)
- Titular Archbishop Francisco de Solís Folch de Cardona (later Cardinal) (1749-01-20 – 1752-09-25)
- Titular Archbishop Niccolò Oddi, Jesuits (S.J.) (later Cardinal) (1754-01-14 – 1764-02-20)
- Titular Archbishop Alexandre-Angélique de Talleyrand-Périgord (later Cardinal) (1766-12-01 – 1777-10-27)
- Titular Archbishop Pierre-François-Martial de Loménie (1788-12-15 – 1794-05-10)
- Titular Archbishop Giuseppe Carrano (1801-07-20 – 1819?)
- Titular Archbishop Hyacinthe-Louis de Quélen (1819-12-17 – 1821-10-20)
- Titular Archbishop Giovan Domenico Stefanelli, Dominican Order (O.P.) (1845-01-20 – 1852-02-05)
- Titular Archbishop Benedict Planchet, S.J. (1853-06-04 – 1859-09-19)
- Titular Archbishop Saint Antonio María Claret y Clará, founder of the Claretians (C.M.F.) (1860-07-15 – 1870-10-24)
- Titular Archbishop Serafino Milani, Franciscans (O.F.M. Obs.) (1874-01-23 – 1874-12-21)
- Titular Archbishop Augusto Giuseppe Duc (1907-12-19 – 1922-12-14)
- Titular Archbishop Ismael Perdomo Borrero (1923-02-05 – 1928-01-02)
- Titular Archbishop Fabio Berdini (1928-03-02 – 1930-03-22)
- Titular Archbishop Giacinto Gaggia (1930-03-29 – 1933-04-15)
- Titular Archbishop Mario Zanin (蔡寧) (1933-11-28 – 1958-08-04)
- Titular Archbishop Albert-Pierre Falière, Paris Foreign Missions Society (M.E.P.) (1959-12-19 – 1968-01-12)

== See also ==
- List of settlements in the Evros regional unit
- Traianopolis (Phrygia), namesake see in Asia Minor

== Sources and external links ==
- GCatholic, with titular incumbent biography links
