= Evrenos Bey Han =

Han in Greece

Coordinates: 40°51′55″N 26°02′00″E

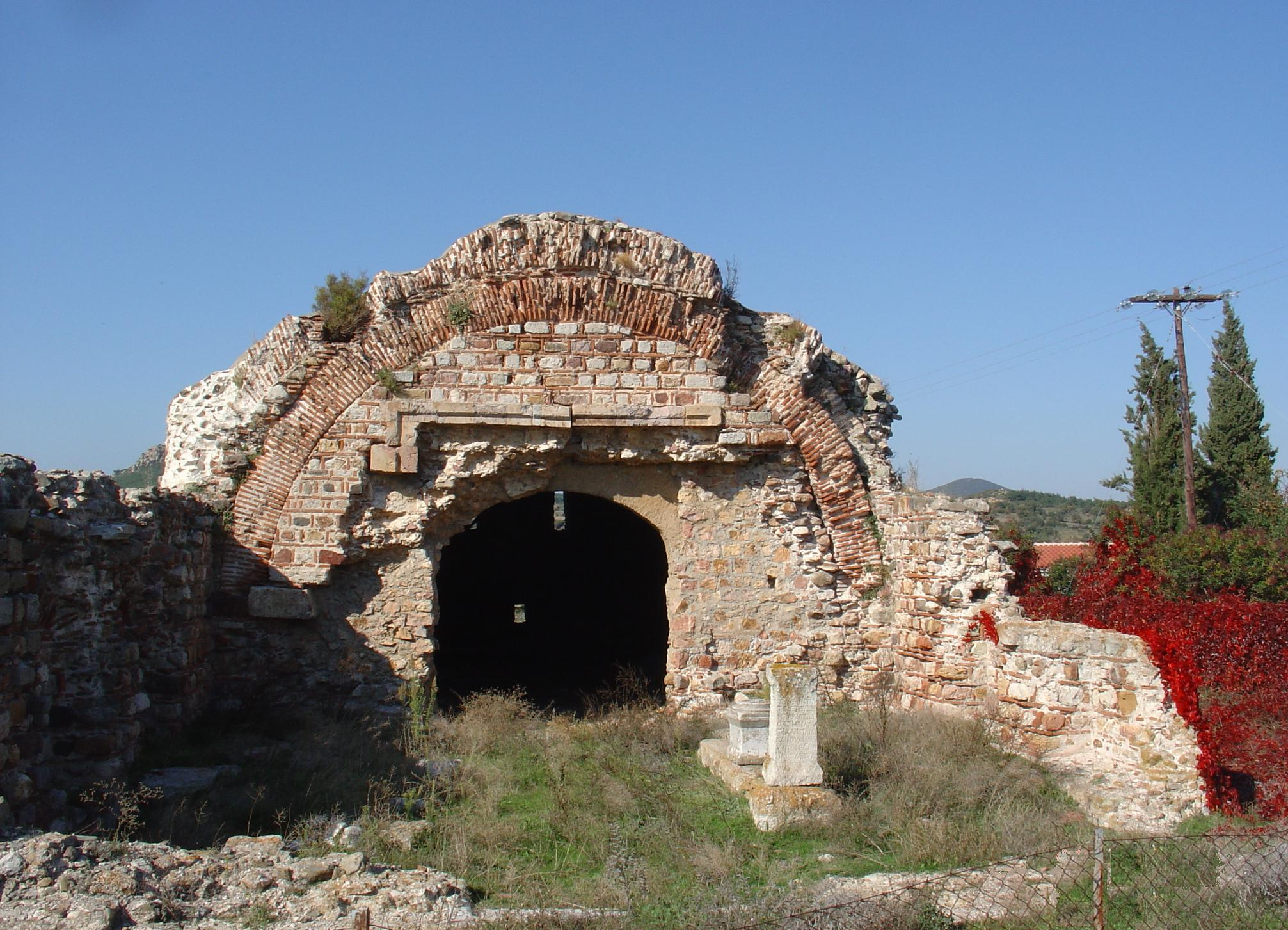
The main entrance of the han of Trajanopolis.

The Evrenos Bey Han, also known as the Hana of Trajanopolis (Greek: Χάνα της Τραϊανούπολης; Turkish: Kara Ilıca’daki Hanı) or just Hana is a caravanserai (han) in northern Greece, and one of the oldest Ottoman monuments in the Balkans. It was built in 1370–90 by Gazi Ahmet Evrenos and is located in the Trajanopolis Baths, just twelve kilometers to the northeast of Alexandroupolis. The monument is a long, rectangular building with external dimensions of 38.8 by 13 metres (127 ft × 43 ft).

== Description ==
Trajanopolis was an important Roman city founded by the emperor Trajan (r. 98–117 AD) on the ancient Via Egnatia.

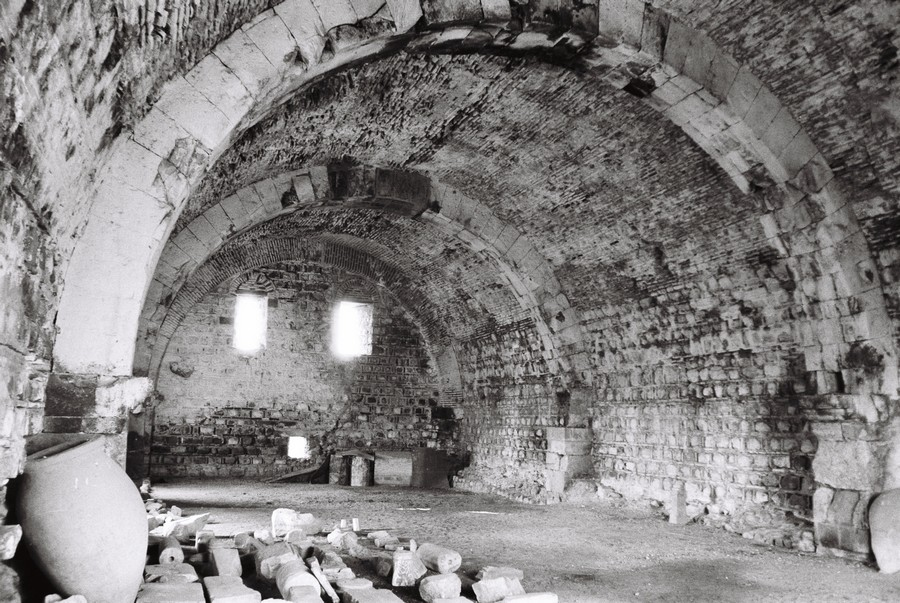
interior view in 1971

Thermal springs could be found in the city, and thus a spa town was created. During Byzantine rule in the seventh and fourteenth centuries, Trajanopolis is mentioned to have been the metropolis of the ecclesiastical province of Rhodope.

The han functioned as an inn (due to the road station) near the Ottoman hamam (baths) complex, of which today ruins remain dating to the sixteenth century. Today, modern facilities for spa therapy have been rebuilt in the archaeological site. The han is characterized by its grandeur, as it was a public utility project by the Ottomans. This work also shows the expansive nature of the empire. As a monument, it differs from the corresponding Byzantine ones in terms of architecture, size and construction method. At the base of the han is the base and slab of an early Christian pulpit.

On the neighboring hill where the small church of Agios Konstantinos and Georgios stands today used to be a center of gathering of dervishes, the Isklar tekke, which was mentioned by the Ottoman traveller Evliya Çelebi back in 1668.

== See also ==
- Feridun Ahmed Bey Hamam
- Oruç Pasha Hamam
- Yunus Bey Mosque
