= Oruç Pasha Hamam =

Historical baths in Didymoteicho, Greece

Coordinates: 41°20′47.33″N 26°29′27.49″E

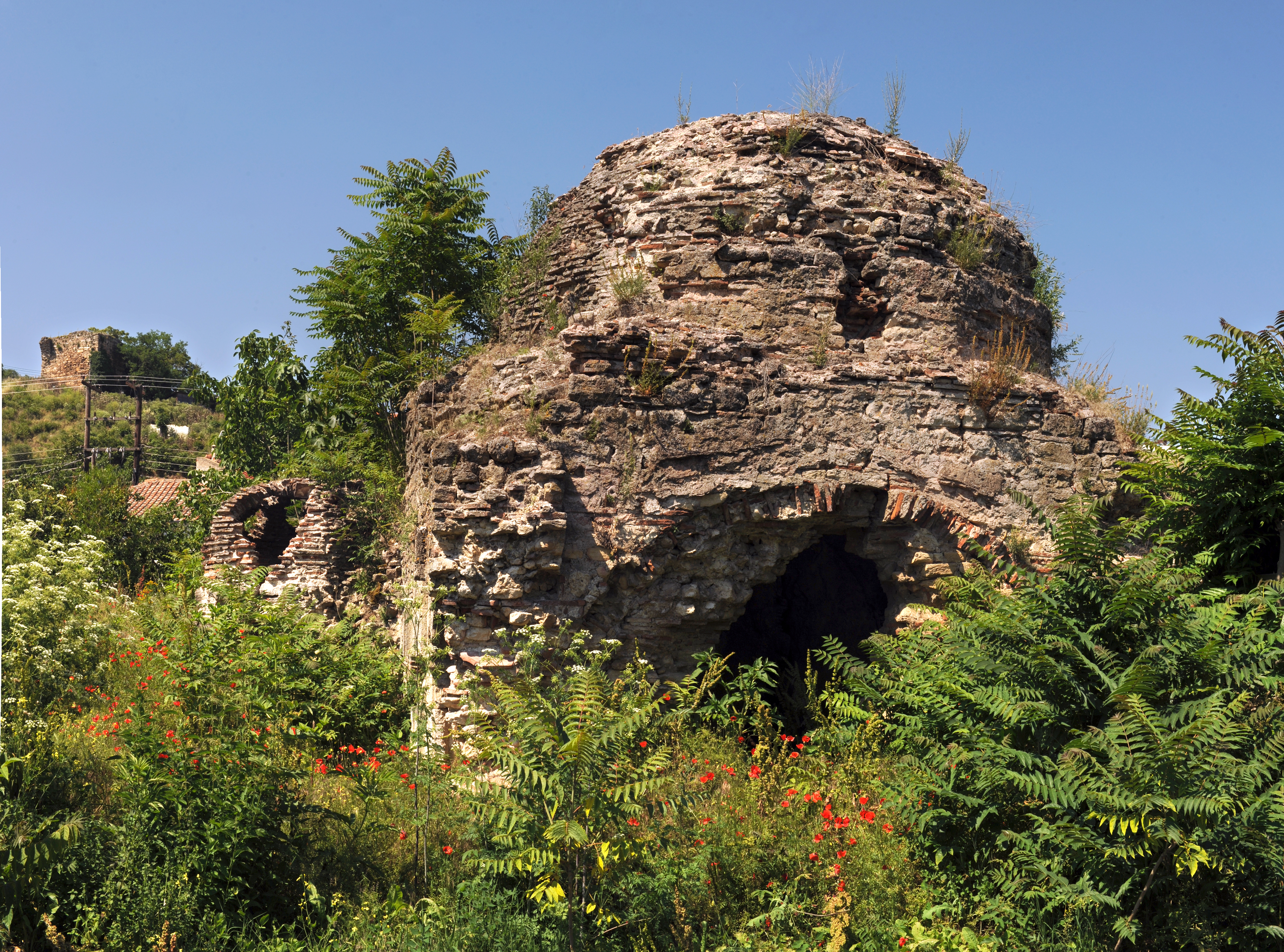
The hamam in its current state.

The Oruç Pasha Hamam (Greek: Χαμάμ του Ορούτς Πασά, from Turkish: Oruç Paşa Hamami), also known as the Bath of Whispers (Turkish: Fısıltı Hamami) or the Baths of Love is an Ottoman bath dating from around 1398-1399 near the banks of the Erythropotamos river, in Didymoteicho, northern Greece.

Today it stands in a very poor state with plant life all over it, although restoration works are planned.

== History ==
According to Dutch Ottomanologist historian Machiel Kiel, this hamam is among the oldest Ottoman hamams found within the borders of Greece, as it was built between 1398 and 1399, mere decades after Didymoteicho's conquest by Sultan Murad I in 1361.

The hamam was open until the early twentieth century, and is now the oldest surviving Ottoman bathhouse in Europe. An agreement was signed on March 14, 2011, between Greece, Bulgaria and the European Union for the promotion of this monument as well as a corresponding bath in Svilengrad, in Bulgaria.

== Architecture ==
The architecture type of the bath is very common among baths built in Greece, defined by a square-shaped domed hot room surrounded by smaller hot rooms. Its masonry is characterized by alternating brick and stone layers. Its cloister dome-vault is tiled with bricks and rests on Turkish triangles.

The entrance to the bath from the north-west side leads to a dressing room measuring 5.10 x 5 m. In the bath there were two sections, the "lukewarm" and the "hot". According to the Ottoman traveller Evliya Çelebi, the masonry contained clay ducts so that the sounds from the "hot" room could be heard in the "lukewarm" room. This is the reason why the bath got the name Fısıltı Hamami meaning "Bath of Whispers". Due to its special acoustics, in this hamam lovers were able to express their passion while the Sublime Porte could be informed of the secrets of exiled pashas.

== See also ==
- Yeni Hamam
- Yahudi Hamam
- Bey Hamam
- Feridun Ahmed Bey Hamam
- Evrenos Bey Han
- Oruç Pasha türbe

== Bibliography ==
- Kanetaki, Eleni (2004). "The Still Existing Ottoman Hamams in Greek territory" (PDF). Metu Jfa. 1 (21). Middle East Technical University / Faculty of Architecture. Archived from the original (PDF) on 2013-01-24.
