= Feridun Ahmed Bey Hamam =

Historical hamam in Didymoteicho, Greece

Coordinates: 41°20′59.24″N 26°29′37.00″E

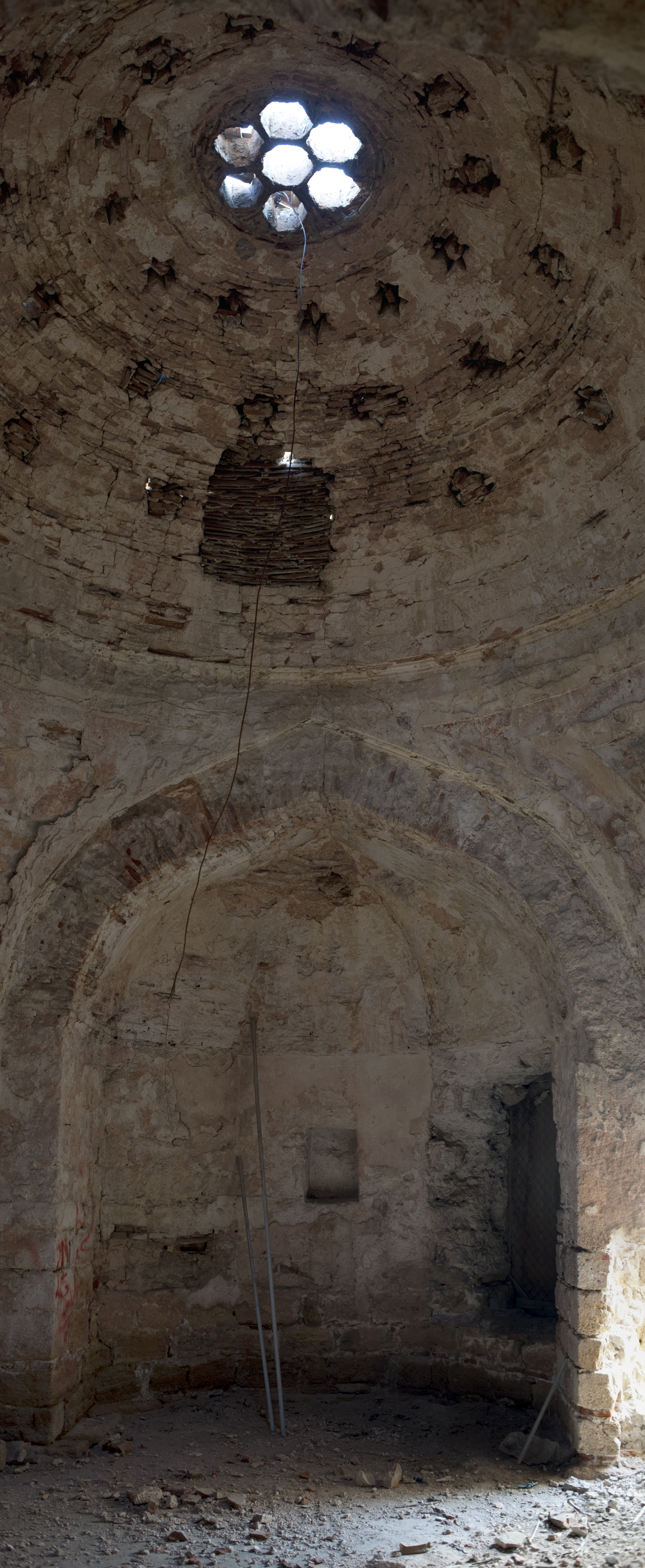
Feridum Ahmed Bey Hamam today.

The Feridun Ahmed Bey Hamam (Greek: Χαμάμ του Φεριντούν Αχμέτ Μπέη, Turkish: Feridun Ahmed Bey Hamam) is an Ottoman bath which dates from 1571/72 and is located to the north of the Mehmed I Mosque in the central square of Didymoteicho, in northern Greece. Today it stands in poor condition.

== Description ==
According to Dutch historian and Ottomanologist Machiel Kiel, on the facade of the hamam there used to be an inscription giving the year of construction as 1571/2, as it is mentioned in the account of the Ottoman traveller Evliya Çelebi.

Feridun Ahmed Bey was a senior official as well as a man of letters. Feridun built these baths in Didymoteicho, as well as a mosque bearing his name, which was demolished at the beginning of the twentieth century. The hamam had two sections, one for men and one for women with a separate entrance for each. The entrance to the men's bath was from the square and had a grand entrance. The baths ceased to function at the beginning of the twentieth century. Part of the building was demolished in the 1970s, but today the monument is protected under the Ministerial Decision of the Ministry of Culture/ΑΡΧ/Β1/Φ37/67046/1492/17-11-1982 (Φ.Ε.Κ. 27/Β/27-1-1983).

== See also ==
- Yeni Hamam
- Oruç Pasha Hamam
