= Poshposh Tekke =

Destroyed monument in Komotini, Greece

Coordinates: 41°7′30″N 25°23′33″E

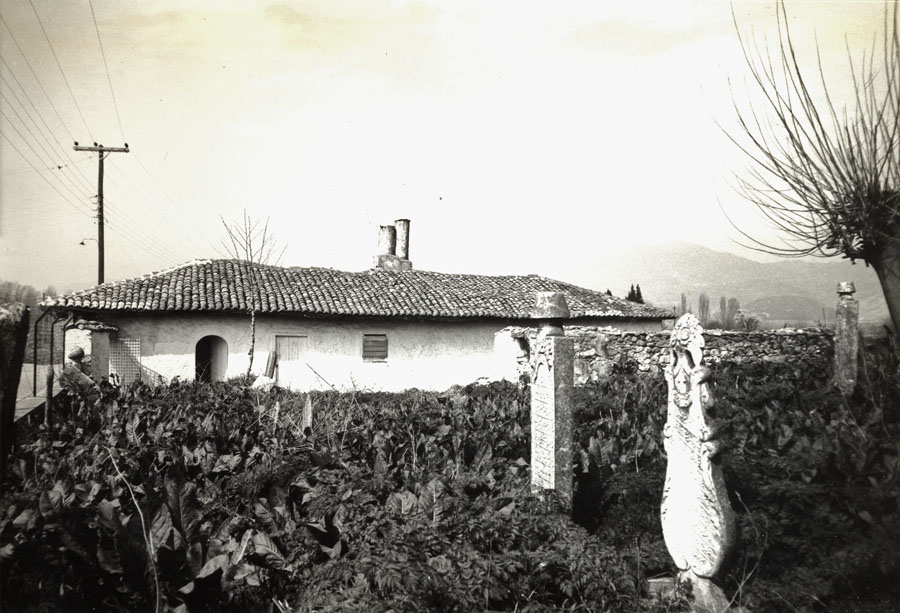
The tekke in 1974, photo taken by Machiel Kiel

The Poshposh Tekke also known as the Posh-Posh Baba Tekke (Greek: Ποσπός Τεκκές; Turkish: Poş-poş, Puş-puş, or Poşpoş Tekkesi) was an Alevi tekke (a khanqah) that was built in the fourteenth century near modern Nea Mosynopolis, in the Poshposh neighbourhood of Komotini, in northern Greece. It stood near the now ruined Yunus Bey Mosque, and was demolished in 1989.

== Description ==
The khanqah was a stone building measuring 12 by 5 metres (39 ft × 16 ft), with a brick-tiled roof and a 25 by 30 metres (82 ft × 98 ft) courtyard. The building had three rooms and three different entrance ways. The first room was the türbe (tomb), the second housed a fireplace and the third was used as a warehouse.

== History of the tekke ==
It has been suggested that the tekke's name is from the dervish Postinpus Baba. This dervish had also founded a tekke in Bursa by order of Sultan Murad I, and thus many Ottoman tekkes of that era bore his name. According to another theory the name is derived from the phrase "postu bos" meaning that the post of the chief Sufi was usually vacant (bos).

The tekke operated until 1989, when it was demolished by the Municipality of Komotini, citing safety concerns due to the structure's poor condition. With the decision 198/2012 of the Municipality of Komotini in July 2012 it was decided to restore the tekke in its original form.

== Gallery ==
Poshposh Tekke

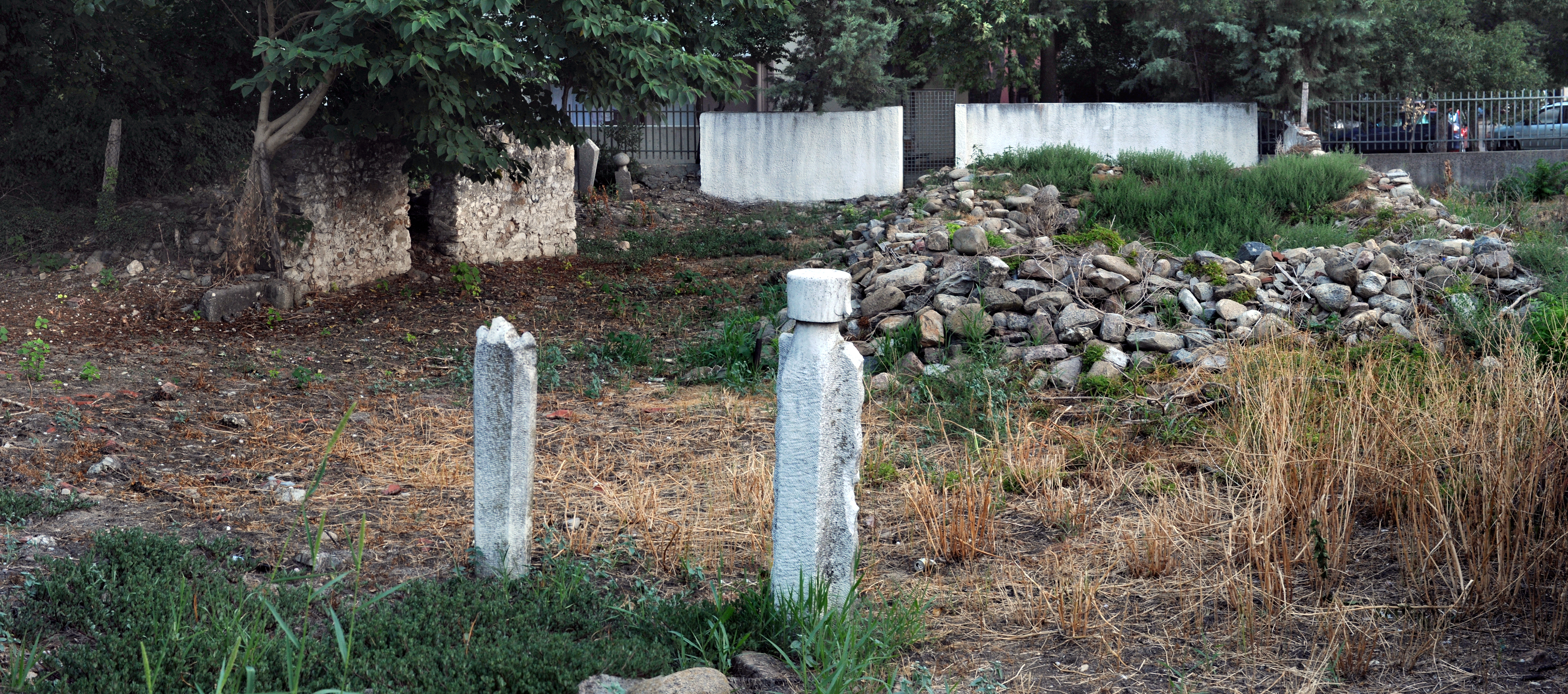
Tombstones.

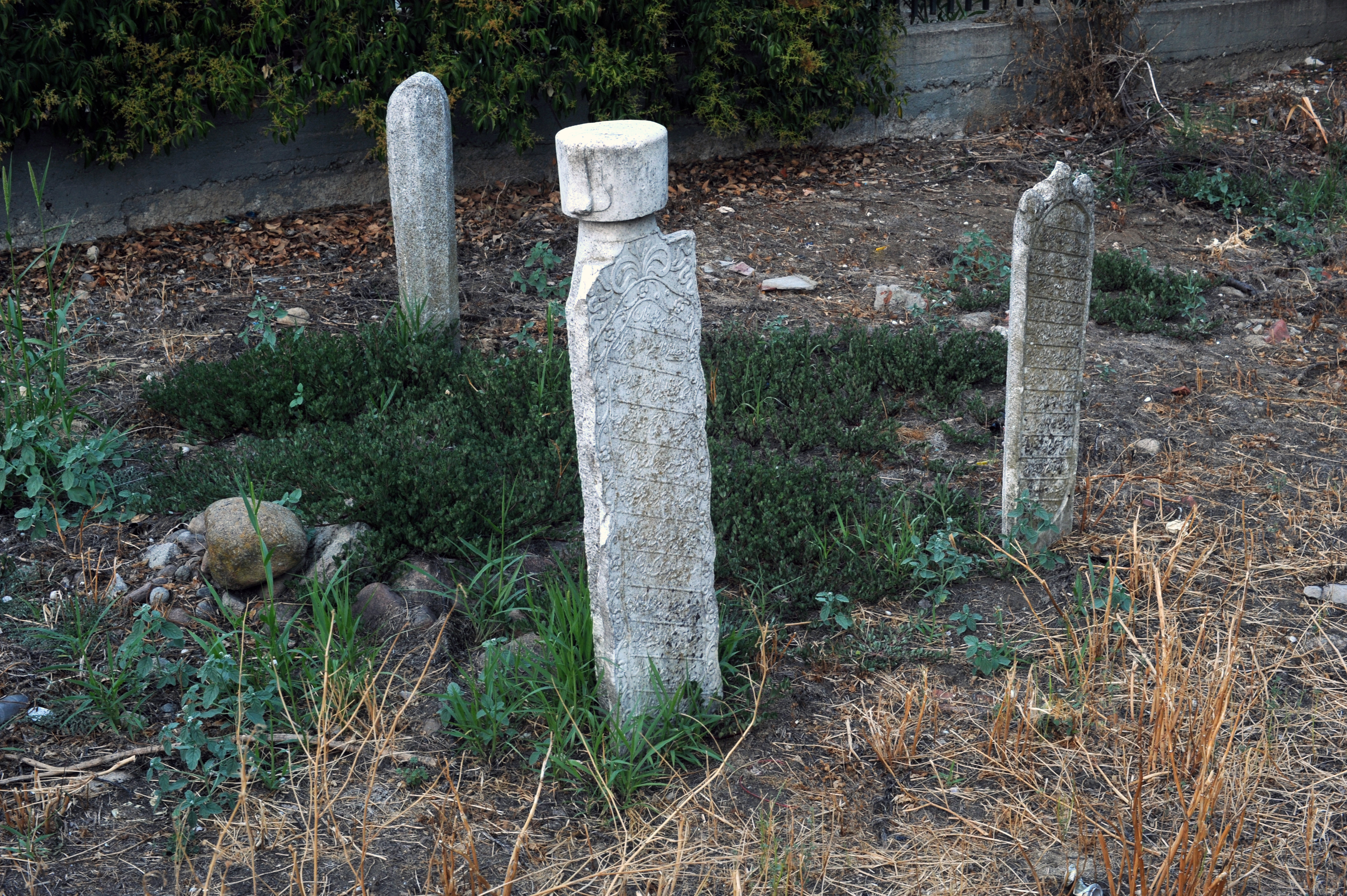
Gravestones.

== See also ==
- Ottoman Greece
- Hayriyye Madrasa
- Greek Muslims

== Bibliography ==
- Ζεγκίνης, Ευστράτιος (1985). "Ο Μπεκτασισμός στην Δ. Θράκη - Συμβολή στην ιστορία της διαδόσεως του μουσουλμανισμού στο Ελλαδικό χώρο (Διδακτορική διατριβή)". Αριστοτέλειο Πανεπιστήμιο Θεσσαλονίκης (ΑΠΘ). - Στην σελίδα 356, εικόνα 33 του διδακτορικού υπάρχει φωτογραφία του τεκέ.
