= Yeni Hamam =

Hamam in Thessaloniki, Greece

Coordinates: 40°38′21″N 22°56′54″E

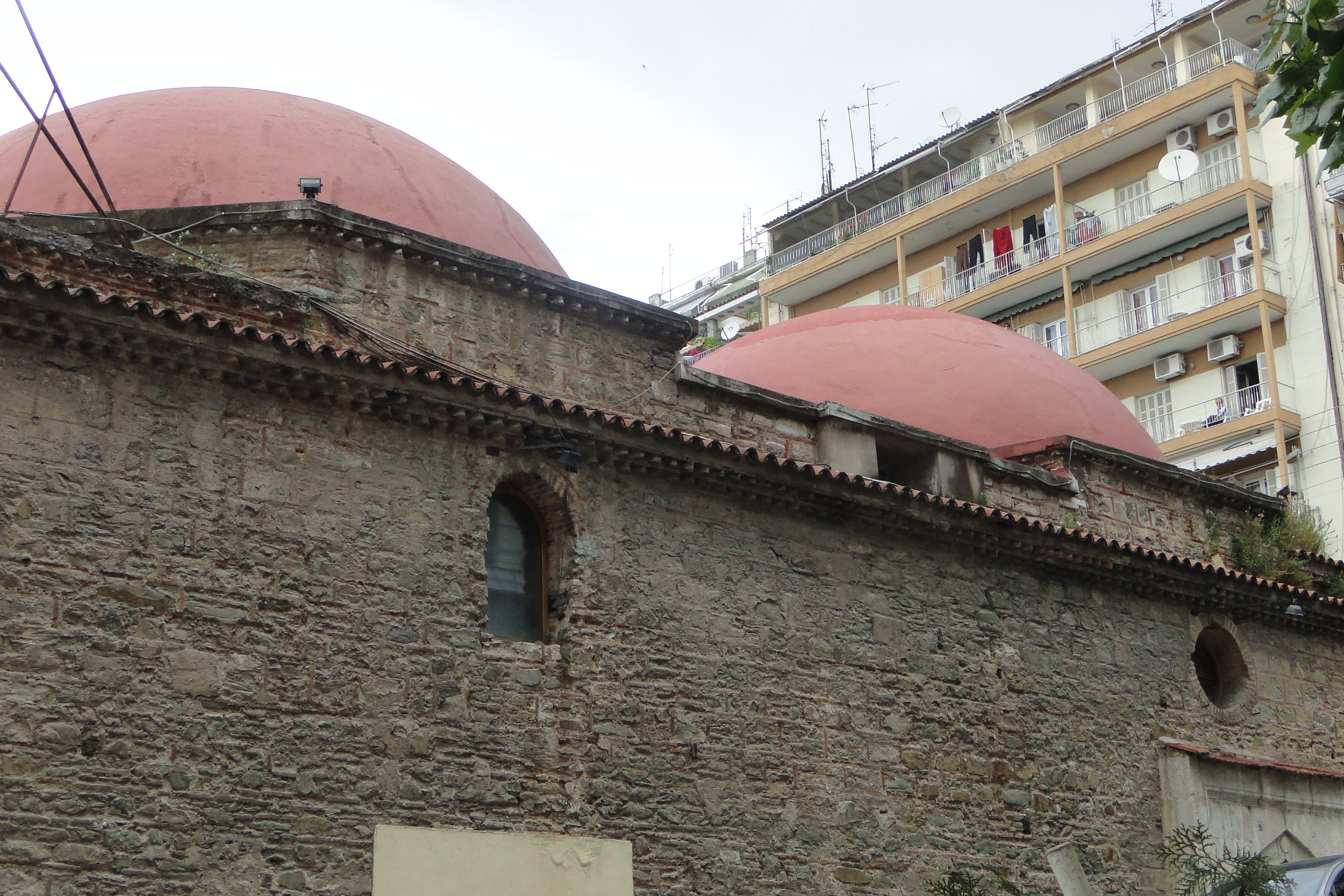
Yeni Hamam in Thessaloniki.

The Yeni Hamam (Greek: Γενί Χαμάμ, meaning "new hamam" in Turkish) is a building dating to the Ottoman period in Thessaloniki, Greece. It was apparently built in the last quarter of the sixteenth century by Khusref Kenkhuda, a property owner in Thessaloniki who probably served as Kehaya (administrator) for the Vizier Sokolou Mehmet Pasha. It functioned as a double bathhouse with separate compartments for men and women, with the usual layout of rooms. Today it is located at the corner of today's Kassandros and Agios Nikolaos streets.

== History ==
The building ceased to function as public baths following the annexation of Thessaloniki by the kingdom of Greece in 1912, unlike the other hamams in the city which remained open. In 1919 it became property of the Greek public, util 1937 when it was bought by a private person who used it as a warehouse.

For many years, a winter cinema operated inside the hamam until the mid-80s, while a summer cinema also operated in its garden. There the organizaztion parallaxi organized movie marathons during summer in the mid-nineties. Soon after that it opened as a tavern called "Seville".

For a large period it functioned as a concert hall in which many Greek musicians and singers performed. Today it remains in private ownership and is used as a café bar and restaurant with the name "Aegle Yeni Hamam".

== See also ==
- Yahudi Hamam
- Ottoman baths of Larissa
- Oruç Pasha Hamam
