= Yunus Bey Mosque =

Historical mosque in Komotini, Greece

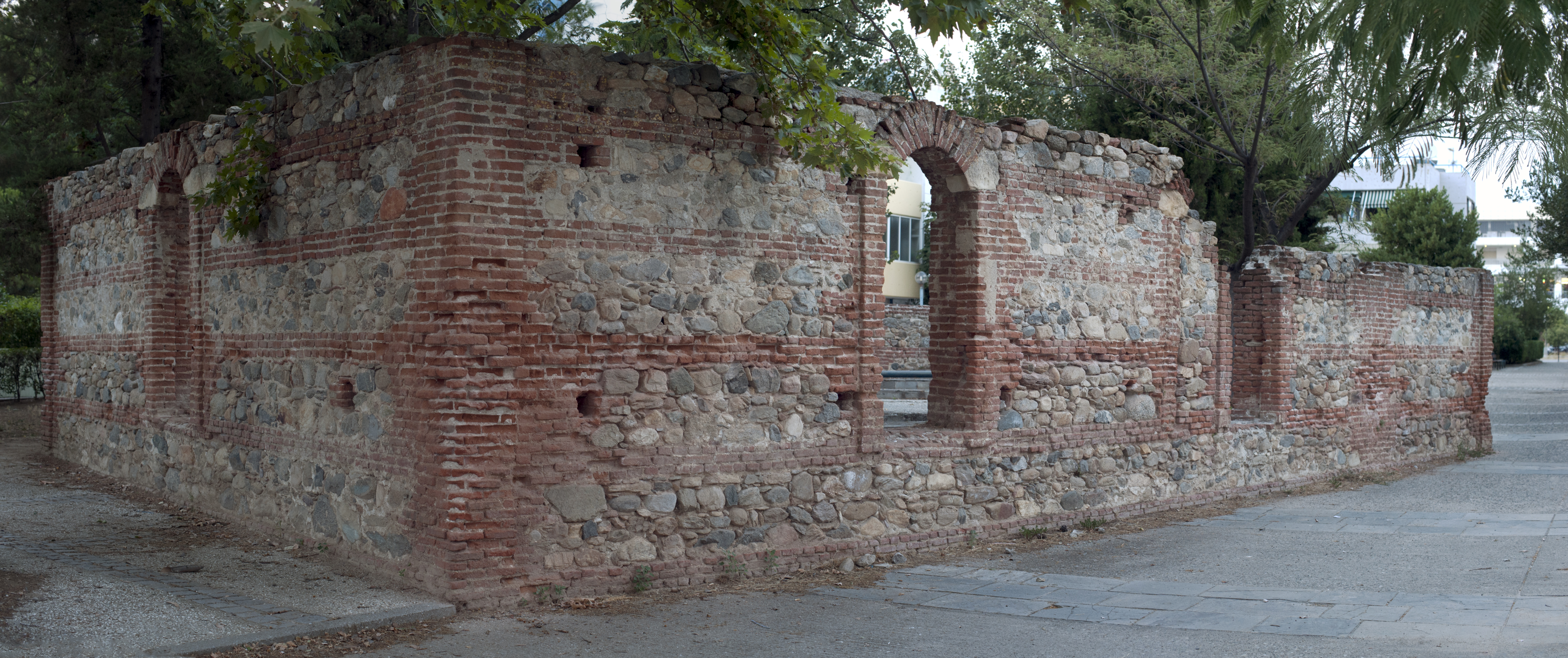
- Ruins of the former mosque in 2012

- Location of the former mosque in Greece

Religion
- Affiliation: Islam (former)
- Ecclesiastical or organizational status: Mosque (former)
- Status: Abandoned (ruinous state)

Location
- Location: Komotini, Rhodope, Eastern Macedonia and Thrace
- Country: Greece
- Interactive map of Yunus Bey Mosque
- Coordinates: 41°7′28.3″N 25°23′34.7″E

Architecture
- Type: Mosque architecture
- Style: Ottoman

Specifications
- Minaret: (since destroyed)
- Materials: Stone

The Yunus Bey Mosque (Greek: Τέμενος Γιούνους Μπέη, from Turkish: Yunus Bey Camii) was an Ottoman-era mosque whose remains now lie in a ruinous state. It is located in the town of Komotini, Western Thrace, in northern Greece.

== History ==
The former mosque was built in what is now the Nea Mosynoupoli district of Komotini. It is located fifty metres east of the Poşpoş Tekke. It was built following the Ottoman conquest of Thrace in the Middle Ages, but the exact year Yunus Bey was erected remains unknown. Today, only its four outer walls and a door survive. The mosque's roof and all inner walls have collapsed. The interior is now used as a playground by local children.

In accordance with the expropriation plans of the municipality of Komotini, an estimated 41,25 m² of land of the plot of Yunus Bey is to be expropriated. This is based on the Komotini city plans that were drawn in 1993, which included several other mosques and masjids.

== See also ==
- Islam in Greece
- List of former mosques in Greece
- Yeni Mosque, Komotini

== Bibliography ==
- Western Thrace Minority University Graduates Association (July 9, 2009). Mosques in Western Thrace. Vienna: Organization for Security and Co-operation in Europe.
