= Machiel Kiel =

Dutch professor of art history (1938–2025)

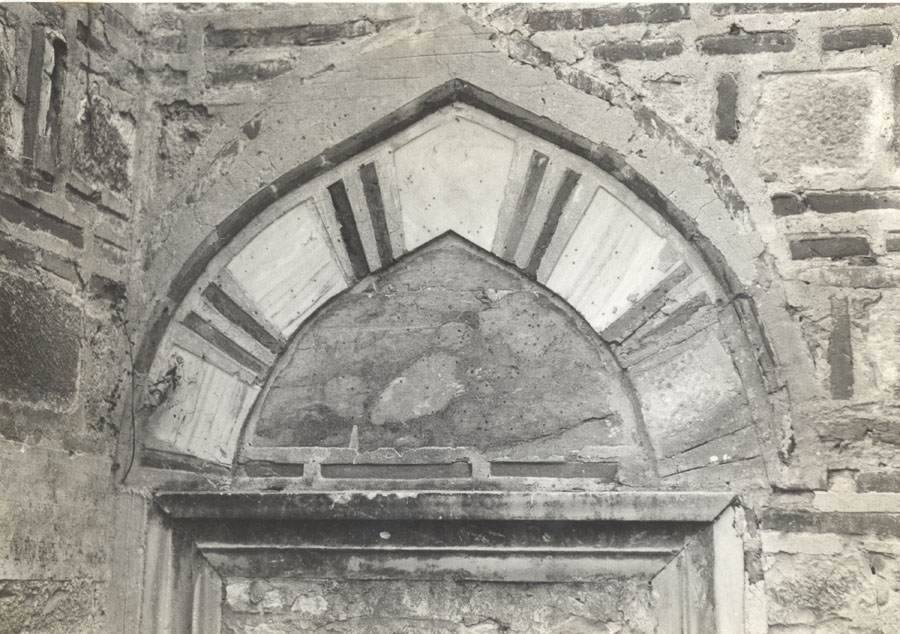
"Wolf tooth” cornice, photo from 1970 by Machiel Kiel.

Machiel Kiel (28 February 1938 – 29 July 2025) was a Dutch professor of art history and narrow specialist in Ottoman architecture in the Balkans.

== Life and career ==
For more than half a century after the Second World War, he worked on the grounds, restorations and with the Ottoman archives in Sofia, Istanbul and Ankara.

He personally researched the Ottoman architecture of the Old Bazaar, Skopje before the 1963 Skopje earthquake.

Kiel was the author of 15 books about this subject. He died in Wormerveer on 29 July 2025, at the age of 87.
