= Yahudi Hamam =

Building of the Ottoman period in Thessaloniki

Coordinates: 40.6347°N 22.9408°E

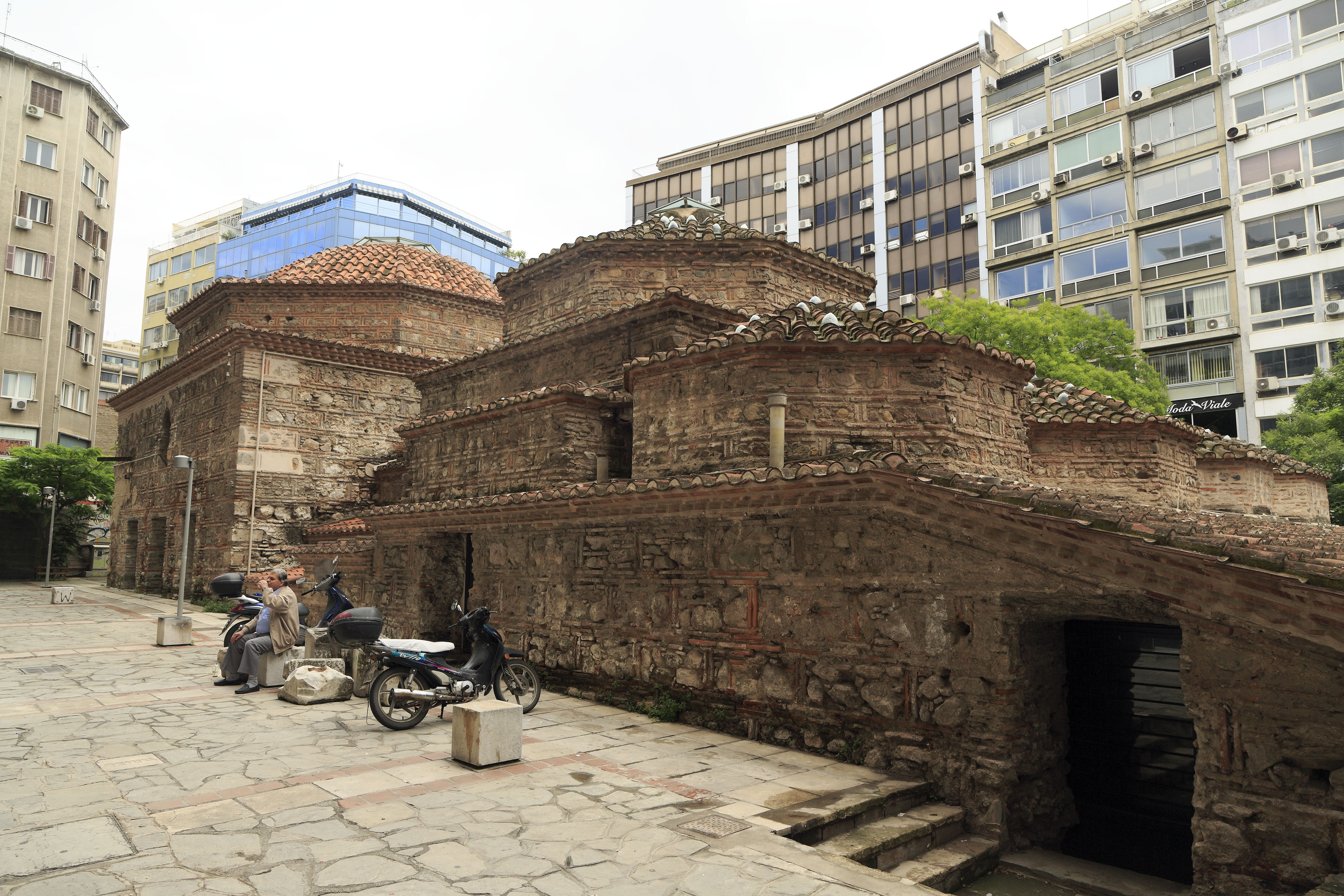
A photo

The Yahudi Hamam (Greek: Γιαχουντί Χαμάμ) is an Ottoman-era bath in Thessaloniki, Greece. Located at the intersection of Vasileos Irakleiou and Frangini streets, the bath dates to the 16th century. Its name means "Bath of the Jews", as the area was predominantly settled by Sephardi Jews. It was also named Pazar Hamam, due to its location in the central market-place of the city.
