= Theodosius and Saint Ambrose =

Painting by Peter Paul Rubens

Theodosius and Saint Ambrose (1615-1616) by Rubens

Theodosius and Saint Ambrose is a painting by Peter Paul Rubens, with assistance from his main pupil Anthony van Dyck, executed c. 1615–1616. It is now in the Kunsthistorisches Museum in Vienna. Rubens created the preparatory drawing, with the painting almost entirely done by van Dyck, who painted his own similar version of the subject a few years later. In the Rubens version, the architectural background is less defined, Theodosius is bearded and the spear and halberd in van Dyck's own version are omitted.

It shows the Roman emperor Theodosius I and his entourage being barred from Milan Cathedral by its archbishop saint Ambrose, as punishment for the Massacre of Thessalonica.

== Bibliography ==
- Gian Pietro Bellori, Vite de' pittori, scultori e architecti moderni, Torino, Einaudi, 1976.
- Didier Bodart, Van Dyck, Prato, Giunti, 1997
- Christopher Brown, Van Dyck 1599-1641, Milano, RCS Libri, 1999 ISBN 8817860603
- Justus Müller Hofstede, Van Dyck, Milano, Rizzoli/Skira, 2004
- Stefano Zuffi, Il Barocco, Verona, Mondadori, 2004
