= Saint Ambrose barring Theodosius from Milan Cathedral =

Painting by Anthony van Dyck

Saint Ambrose Barring Theodosius from Milan Cathedral
- Saint Ambrose barring Theodosius from Milan Cathedral
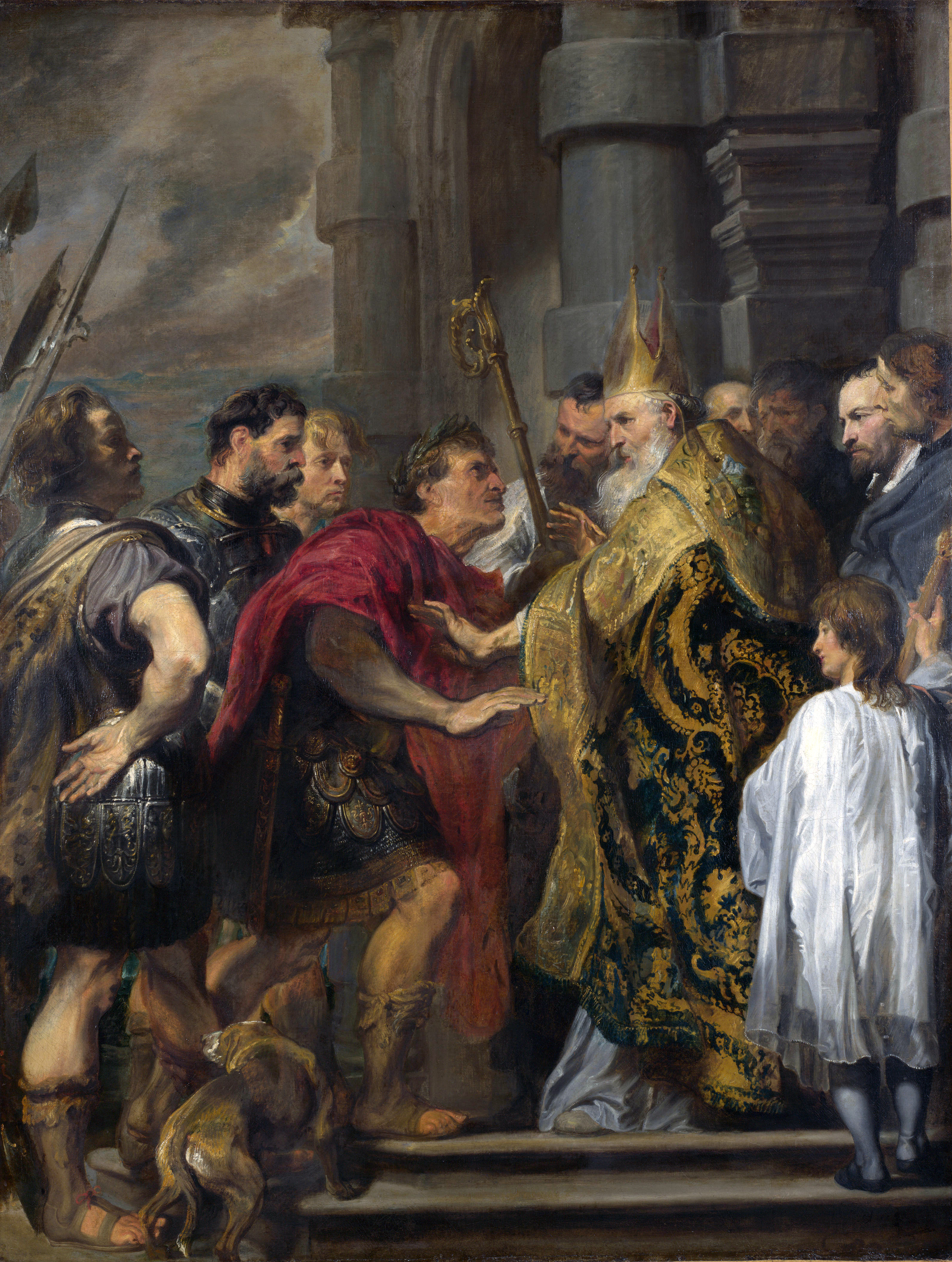
- Artist: Anthony van Dyck
- Year: c. 1619–20
- Medium: Oil on canvas
- Dimensions: 149 cm (59 in) × 113 cm (44 in)
- Location: National Gallery
- Accession no.: NG50
- Identifiers: RKDimages ID: 37078; Art UK artwork ID: the-emperor-theodosius-is-forbidden-by-saint-ambrose-to-enter-milan-cathedral-115572

Saint Ambrose barring Theodosius from Milan Cathedral is a painting of c. 1619–20 by Anthony van Dyck in the National Gallery, in London.

It draws heavily on a 1615-16 treatment of the same subject by Peter Paul Rubens, on which van Dyck had worked as a studio assistant. In van Dyck's version, Theodosius is beardless, the architectural background is more defined, a spear and a halberd are added on the left-hand side and a dog in the bottom-left.

The painting depicts the Roman emperor Theodosius I and his entourage being barred from Milan Cathedral by its archbishop Saint Ambrose, as punishment for the Massacre of Thessalonica.

== See also ==
- List of paintings by Anthony van Dyck

== Sources ==
- National Gallery, St Ambrose barring Theodosius from Milan Cathedral

== Bibliography ==
- Gian Pietro Bellori, Vite de' pittori, scultori e architecti moderni, Torino, Einaudi, 1976.
- Didier Bodart, Van Dyck, Prato, Giunti, 1997.
- Christopher Brown, Van Dyck 1599–1641, Milano, RCS Libri, 1999.ISBN 8817860603
- Justus Müller Hofstede, Van Dyck, Milano, Rizzoli/Skira, 2004.
- Stefano Zuffi, Il Barocco, Verona, Mondadori, 2004.
