= Medieval Greece =

Medieval Greece refers to geographic components of the area historically and modernly known as Greece, during the Middle Ages.

== States ==
These include:

- Byzantine Greece (Early to High Middle Ages)
- Northern Greece under the First Bulgarian Empire
- various High Medieval Crusader states ("Frankish Greece"):
  - Latin Empire
  - Kingdom of Thessalonica
  - Principality of Achaea
  - Duchy of Athens
- various Byzantine splinter states:
  - Empire of Nicaea
  - Despotate of Epirus-Empire of Thessalonica
  - Despotate of the Morea
- Northern Greece under the Second Bulgarian Empire (Ivan Asen II of Bulgaria)
- Northern and central Greece under the Serbian Empire
- Ottoman Greece (Late Middle Ages)

== See also ==
- Medieval Greek
