= Butheric =

Roman-Gothic general (d. 390 CE)

Butheric (German: Butherich; Latin: Buthericus; died 390) was a Roman general of Gothic descent. Under the reign of emperor Theodosius I, Butheric was stationed in Thessalonica as a magister militum. According to Sozomen, in June of the year 390 he had a famous circus charioteer arrested in Thessalonica, who openly practiced pederasty. This was based on the emperor's law which punished "sin against nature" with death. The population reacted violently against the arrest, both for the popularity of the charioteer and for prejudices against Goths. Butheric was lynched by the mob in the circus. In retaliation, Theodosius authorized his Gothic soldiers to punish the people of city, in what is known as the Massacre of Thessalonica.

== Sources ==
- Alexander Demandt: Magister militum. In: Paulys Realencyclopädie der classischen Altertumswissenschaft (RE). Supplementband XII, Stuttgart 1970, Sp. 553–790, hier 717.
