= Navarinou Square =

Square in Thessaloniki, Greece

Coordinates: 40.6307°N 22.9487°E

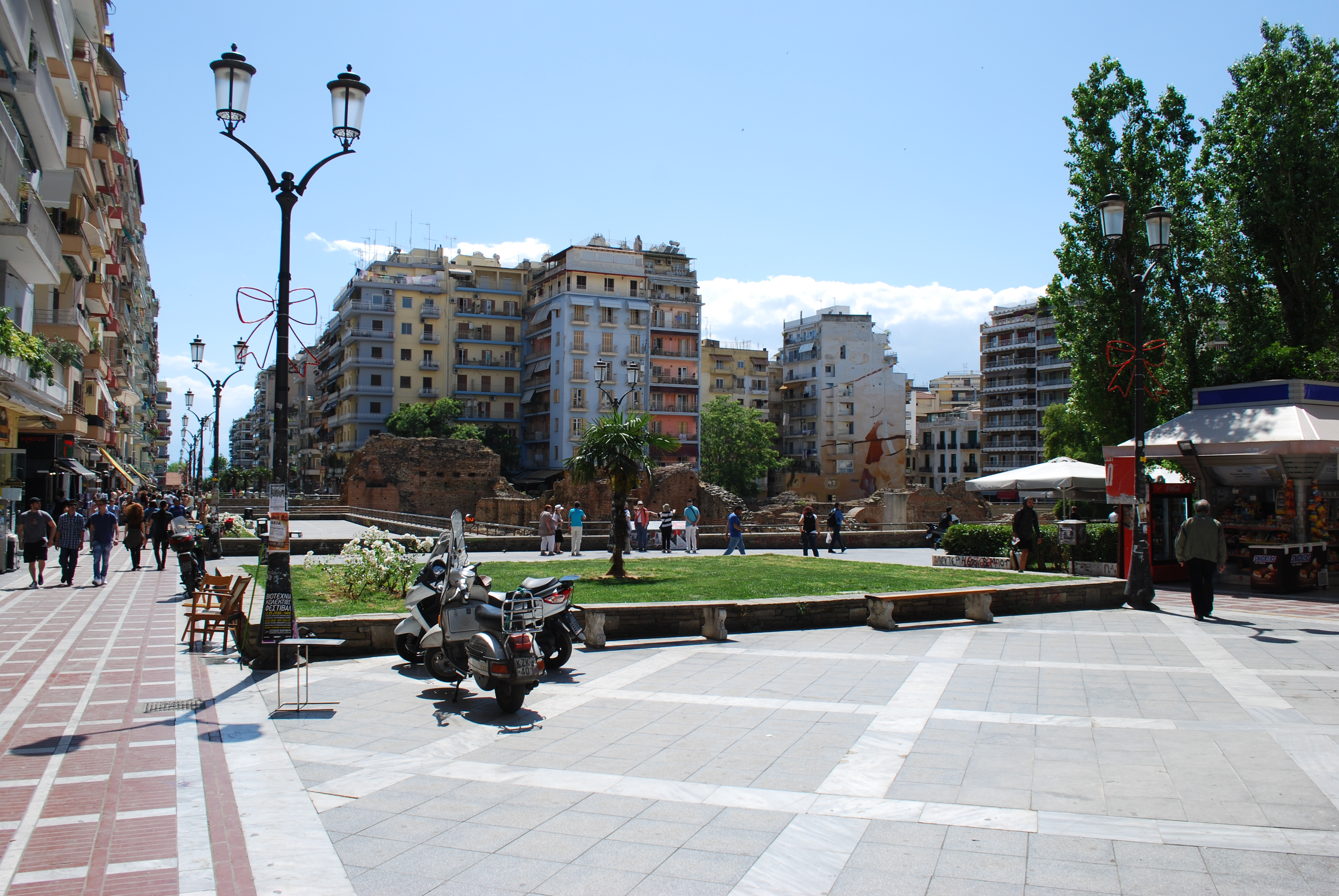
View of the square

Navarinou Square (Greek: Πλατεία Ναυαρίνου) is a square in the city of Thessaloniki in Greece. It is named after the Battle of Navarino, a crucial battle of the Greek War of Independence.

== History ==
The square dates back to the Roman period of the city, with the ruins of the palace of Galerius located within it. The square is beside the "Hippodromus Square", the ancient site of Hippodrome, where the Massacre of Thessalonica took place during the reign of Theodosius I.

Today Navarinou is a popular meeting place, mainly amongst the student population of the city.

== Gallery ==
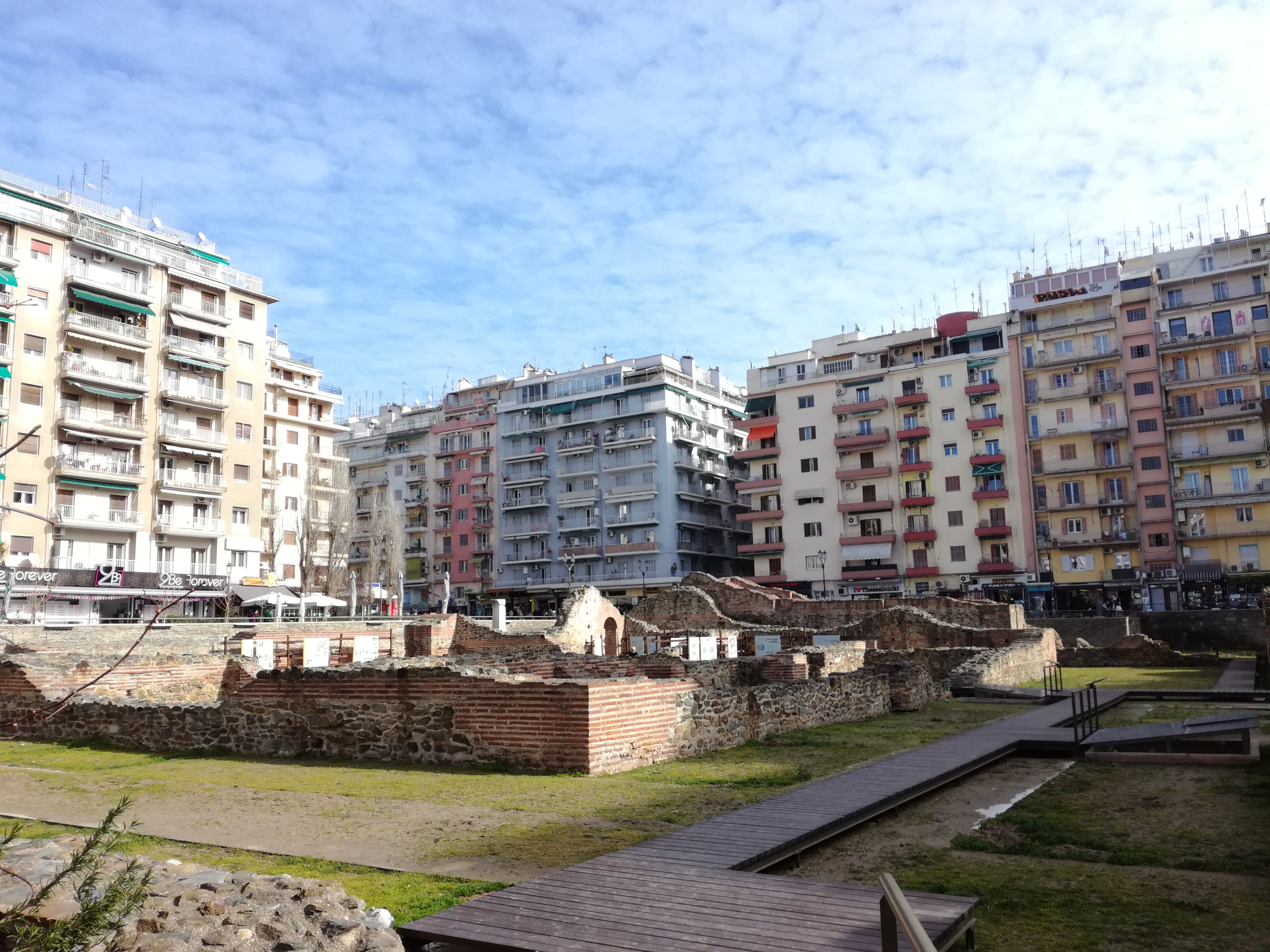
Remains of the Palace of Galerius

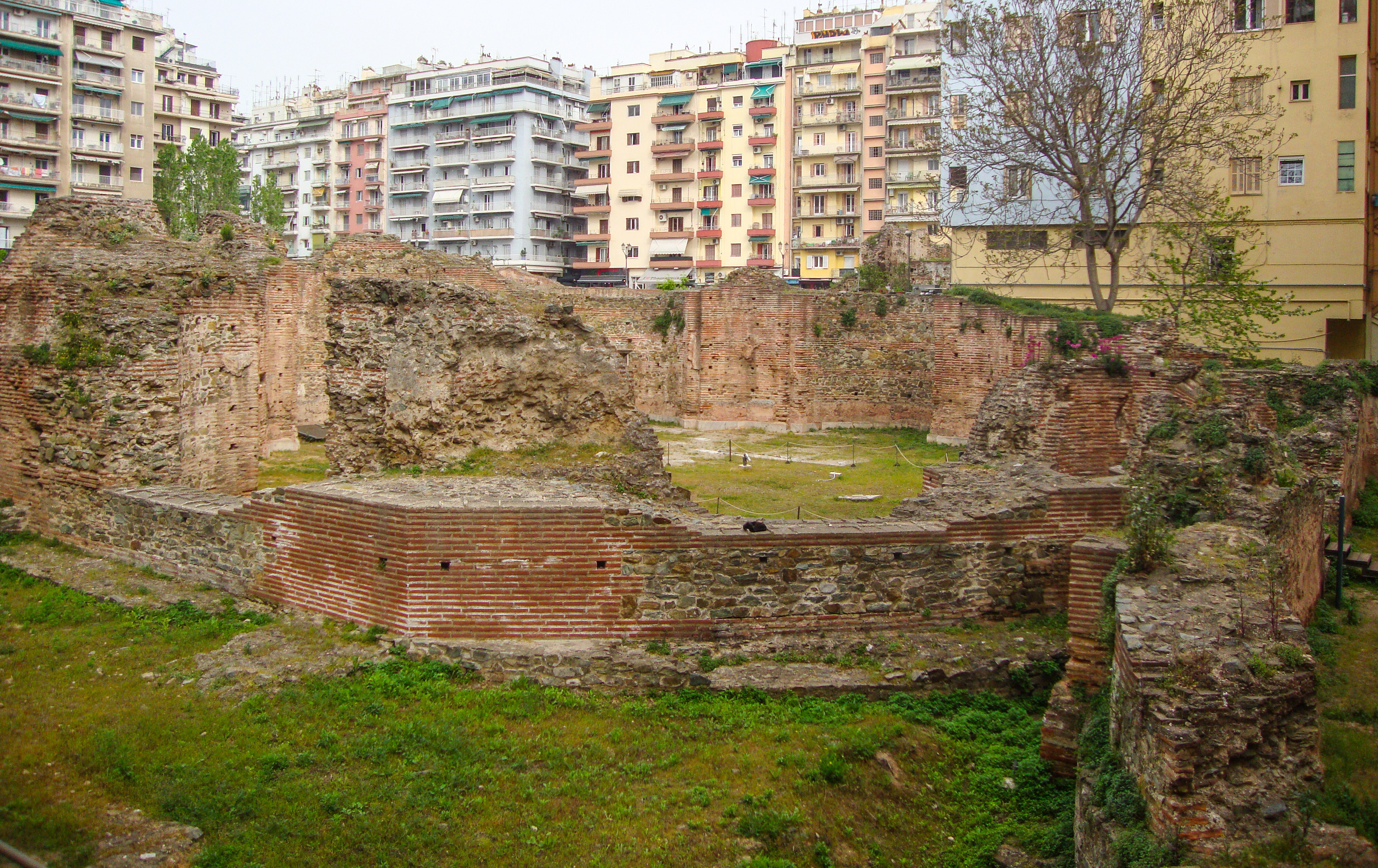
Remains of the palace

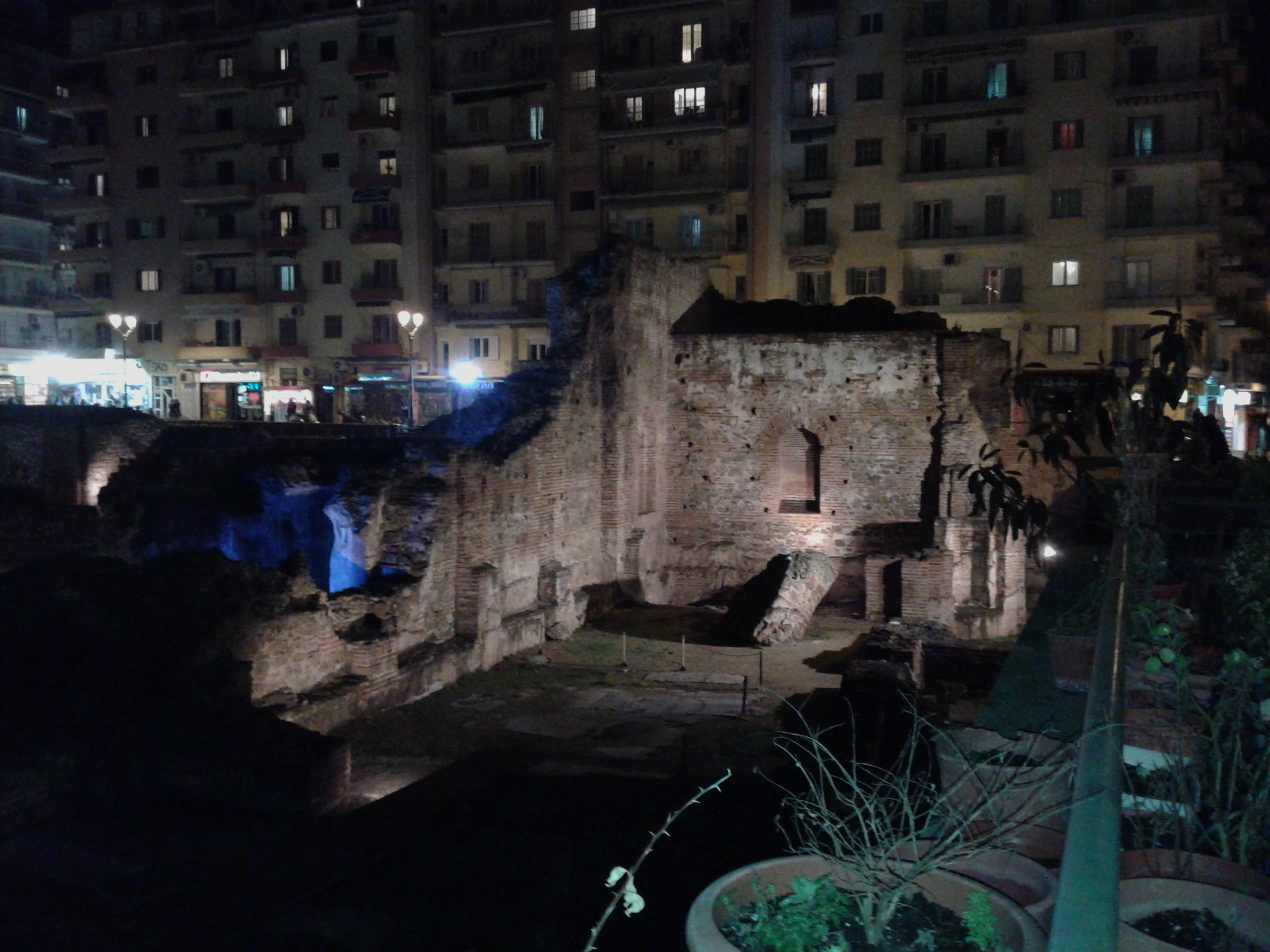
Nightview

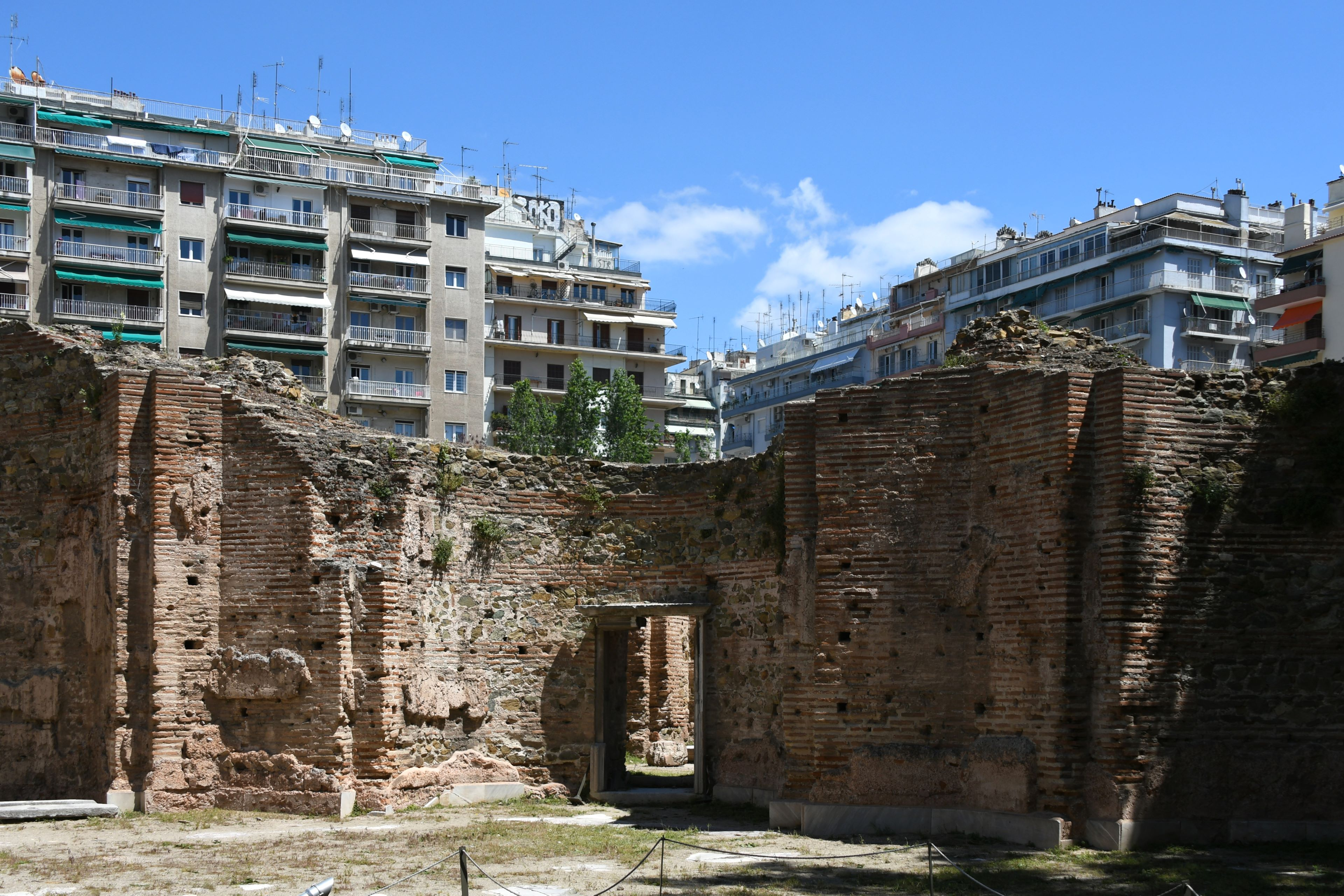
Close view

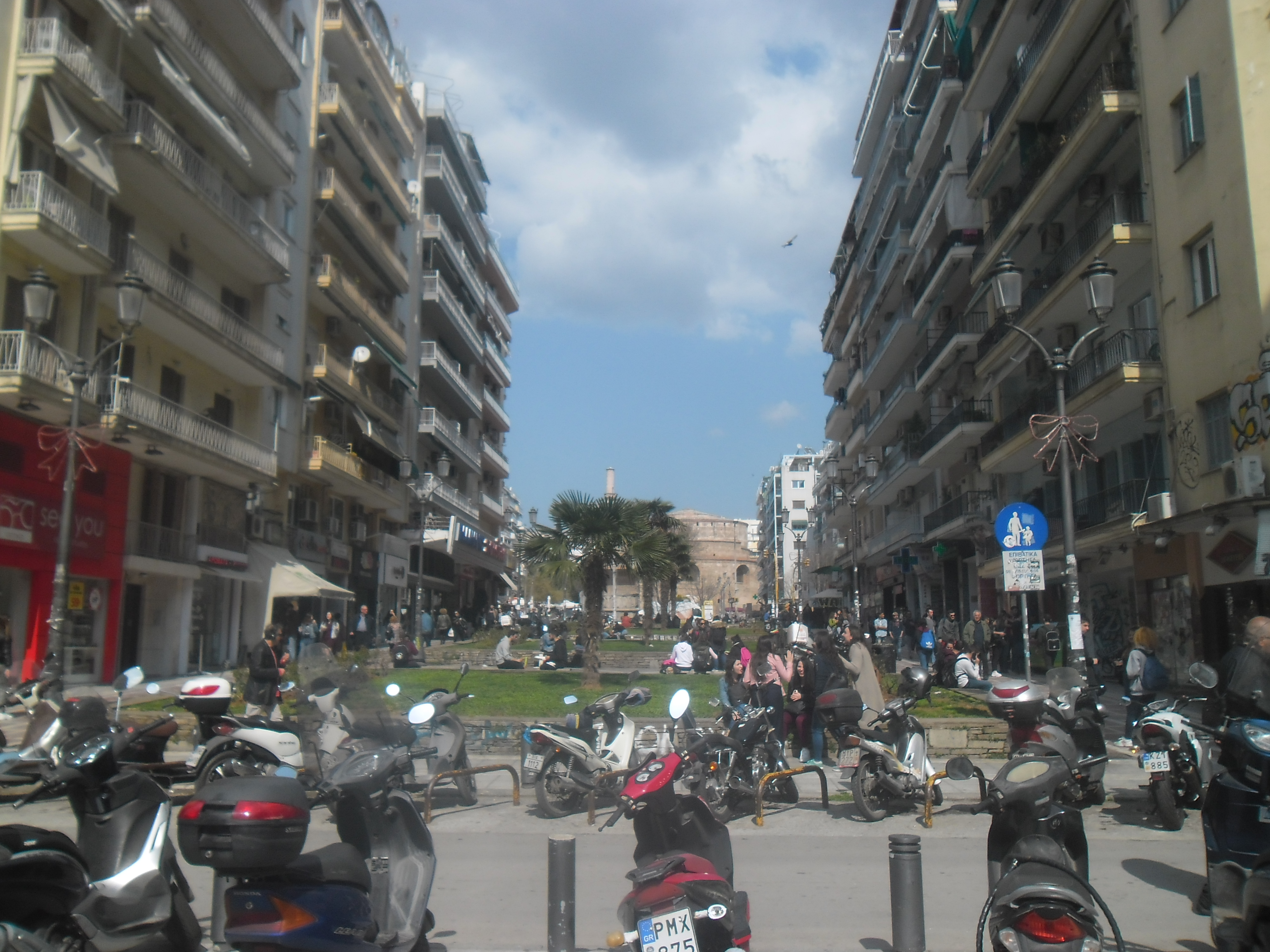
The square with view to the Rotonda
