= Massacre of Thessalonica =

390 Roman massacre under Theodosius I

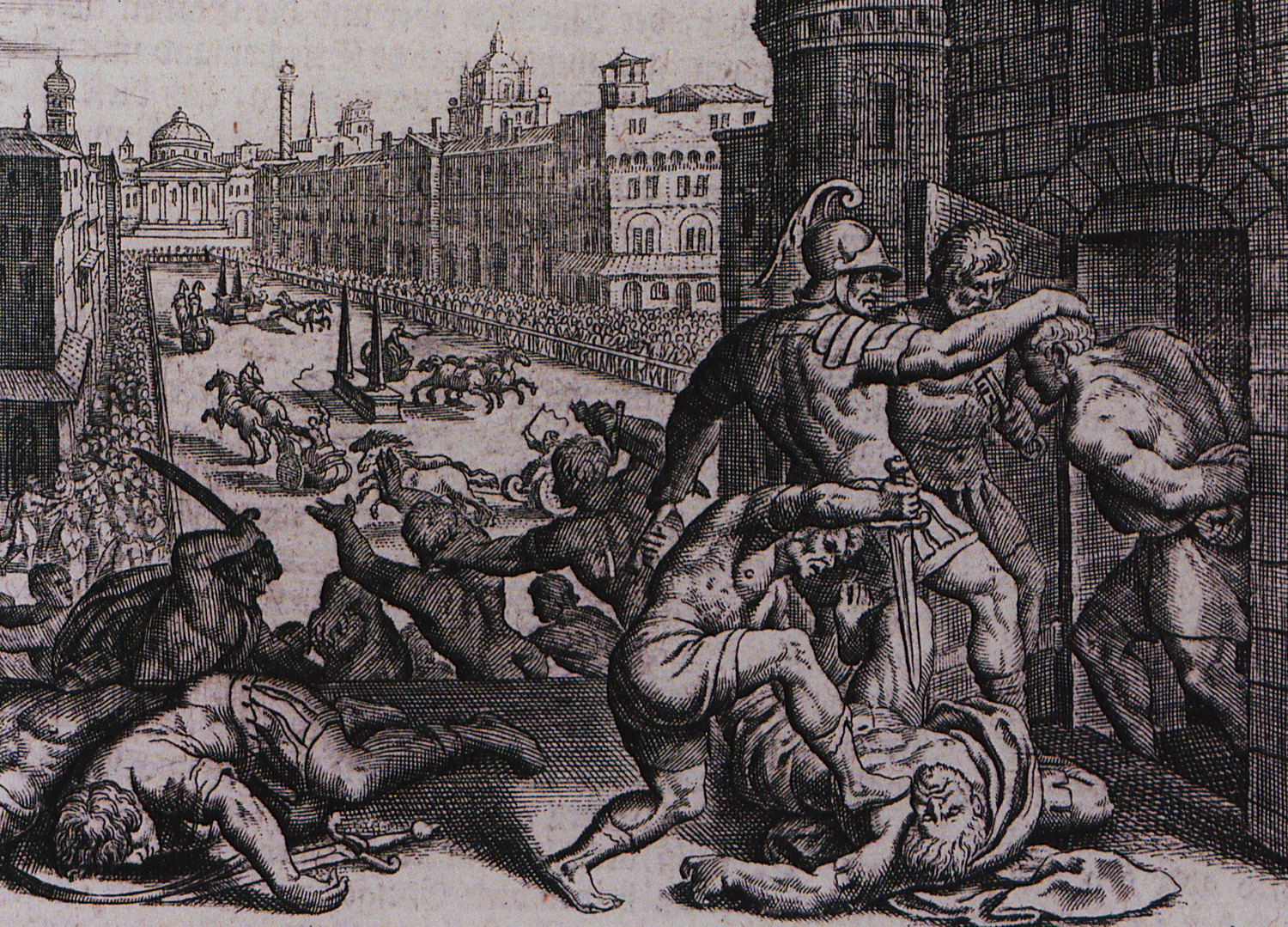
Massacre in the Hippodrome of Thessalonica in 390, 16th-century wood engraving.

The Massacre of Thessalonica in Macedonia, Greece, was a massacre of local civilians by Roman troops which is believed to have occurred around 390. According to Sozomen, in June of that year, Butheric, a Roman general stationed in Thessalonica as a magister militum, was lynched in an urban riot by an angry mob in the circus after having a famous circus charioteer arrested for pederasty, and refusing the people's demand for his release, although, this is found in only one source. In response, Theodosius authorized his Gothic soldiers to punish the people of the city resulting in the killing of a large number of citizens when they were assembled in the city's hippodrome.

Modern historians have had difficulty discerning the details of the massacre and its aftermath, as there are no contemporaneous accounts of the event. Instead, the works of fifth-century church historians provide the earliest record of what happened. Many parts of these accounts contradict one another, and some are of questionable reliability. The pagan historians of late antiquity do not discuss the massacre at all. Scholars contend that most extant records portray events by focusing on the moral perspective rather than the historical and political details. This makes it difficult for modern historians to distinguish fact from legend. Nonetheless, most classicists accept at least the basic account of the massacre, although they continue to dispute when it happened, who was responsible for it, what motivated it, and what impact it had on subsequent events.

Most scholars agree that Emperor Theodosius the Great played at least some role in either ordering or permitting the massacre, although others contend that the soldiers simply got out of control. Historically, Theodosius took responsibility upon himself, and that is when Ambrose (339–397 AD), bishop of Milan, became involved. Ambrose was absent from court when these events took place, and though he was one of Theodosius' many counselors, he was not one of the consistory (Theodosius' closest advisory council). Ambrose got much of his information on Theodosius through an informant, and, after he was informed of events concerning the events at Thessalonica, Ambrose wrote Theodosius a letter stating the emperor needed to demonstrate repentance for the massacre, further adding that emperor Theodosius would be forbidden from receiving the Eucharist until he had done so. History indicates Theodosius chose to cooperate with Ambrose' requirement.

== Historical background ==
Theodosius I, also known as Theodosius the Great, became emperor in 379. Mark Hebblewhite, ancient historian at Macquarie University, explains that the emperor Valens had just died, along with much of the eastern army, at the 378 Battle of Adrianople leaving the empire exposed to the barbarian threat. Theodosius was 32 years old when he took the throne with years of military leadership experience already behind him, but circumstances in the empire were not in his favor. Boniface Ramsey says Roman society was becoming less urban centered and more rural as the great days of the cities were gone, the middle class was increasingly stressed, and the situation of the poor was dire. The Germanic threat and their incursions into Roman territory disturbed the peace of Roman society everywhere. Hebblewhite says Theodosius was a Latin speaking westerner and a Nicene Christian when he became ruler of the religiously mixed, Greek-speaking East, yet he still managed to leave an indelible mark on history. He was a man who radiated strength, writes Hebblewhite, who transformed his society through his personal desire to reunify the empire, and his desire to bring unity to a badly divided church.

Ambrose was invested as Bishop of Milan in 376 AD, the same year the 16-year-old Gratian became emperor. Paulinus records in his biography, The Life of Ambrose, that before Ambrose became a bishop, he was an elected official of the Roman government, a magistrate, and Governor of Aemilia-Liguria in northern Italy. In 374, the bishop of Milan, Auxentius died. Conflict in the diocese of Milan between the Nicene Christians and the Arians, and the probability of an uproar over who would be elected the next bishop of Milan, led Ambrose to take troops, go to the election site, and speak to the people. His address was interrupted by a call, "Ambrose, for bishop!" which was taken up by the whole assembly. At first he refused, and fled to a colleague's home, believing he was not suitable for the position, since he was not yet baptized. But Emperor Gratian wrote a letter praising the appropriateness of Rome appointing individuals who had demonstrated they were worthy, and Ambrose's host gave him up. Within a week, Ambrose was baptized, ordained and duly consecrated bishop of Milan. Neil B. McLynn, classics scholar at Oxford, writes that "The next four years would see Ambrose become ... a figure of empire-wide importance".

As bishop, he adopted an ascetic lifestyle, donated his money to the poor and his land to the church, excepting only what was required to make provision for his sister Marcellina. Ramsey characterizes Ambrose as a spiritual man whose public activities were guided by spiritual considerations, but who was also straightforward, practical, and fearless, epitomizing the self-confidence of the age in which he lived. Ramsey also describes him as accepting of different customs, adapting himself to whatever customs prevailed wherever he happened to be, and as a highly adept politician.

By the time of the Thessalonian affair, Ambrose had been a bishop for 16 years, and during his episcopate, had seen the death of three emperors before Theodosius. These produced significant political storms, yet Ambrose held his place using what McLynn calls his "considerable qualities [and] considerable luck" to survive. Theodosius had been emperor for 11 years, had temporarily settled the Gothic wars, won two civil wars, offering clemency afterwards, and weathered his own storms.

== Description of events ==
John Curran writes one description of events in The Cambridge Ancient History: "In 390, Butheric, the garrison commander of Illyricum which included Thessalonica, was lynched by a mob of citizens in a dispute over the detention of a charioteer. Theodosius decided that a clear demonstration of his anger was required and in April 390, when the citizens of Thessalonica had gathered in the circus of their town, the emperor’s troops were let loose. The slaughter was frightful; 7,000 men, women and children were massacred in three hours. Ambrose, the Bishop of Milan withdrew in horror from the emperor’s court. He denounced Theodosius’ wickedness and banned him from receiving communion until he had repented. The emperor sought absolution and was readmitted to communion on Christmas day 390, after an eight-month penance".

Historian Daniel Washburn writes that several "key aspects of this sequence remain murky". Summarizing the core elements, he writes: "...the people of Thessalonica revolted, killing at least one public official. For this infraction, the empire struck back with a punishment that, intentionally or not, ended in a massacre. The saga continued as Bishop Ambrose of Milan in a famous letter rebuked the emperor Theodosius for his responsibility for the bloodshed. Additionally, Ambrose vowed to refuse him the Eucharist until the emperor exhibited proper remorse. The affair concluded when Theodosius accepted the bishop's terms of repentance". Washburn adds that the exact date of the massacre is unknown and disputed, but general consensus places it in the spring or summer of 390 AD.

Washburn's account is based on his belief that Sozomen gives the fullest account of the riot's origins. Sozomen wrote that a popular charioteer tried to rape a cup-bearer, (other sources say a male servant in a tavern or Butheric himself), and in response, Butheric arrested and jailed the charioteer. According to Sozomen, the populace demanded the chariot racer's release, and when Butheric refused, a general revolt rose up, costing Butheric his life. Sozomen is the only source for this story about the charioteer. The other sources do not include these or many of the other details that have become part of the legend: they do not say how strong the garrison was, or whether or not the garrison was composed of Gothic allies and the riot racially motivated, or even whether the "military officer" in question was, himself, a Goth. The sole source on who the officer was, is again, Sozomen, who supplies only enough information to identify Butheric as the commanding general of the field army in Illyricum (magister militum per Illyricum). Stanislav Doležal, philosopher at the University of South Bohemia, says the name "Butheric" indicates he might very well have been a Goth, and that the general's ethnicity "could have been" a factor in the riot, but none of the early sources actually say so.

Robert Frakes says this is all that can be safely assumed: "there was a riot, and some of the inhabitants [of Thessalonica] killed an important military officer".

== Commentary ==
=== Sources ===
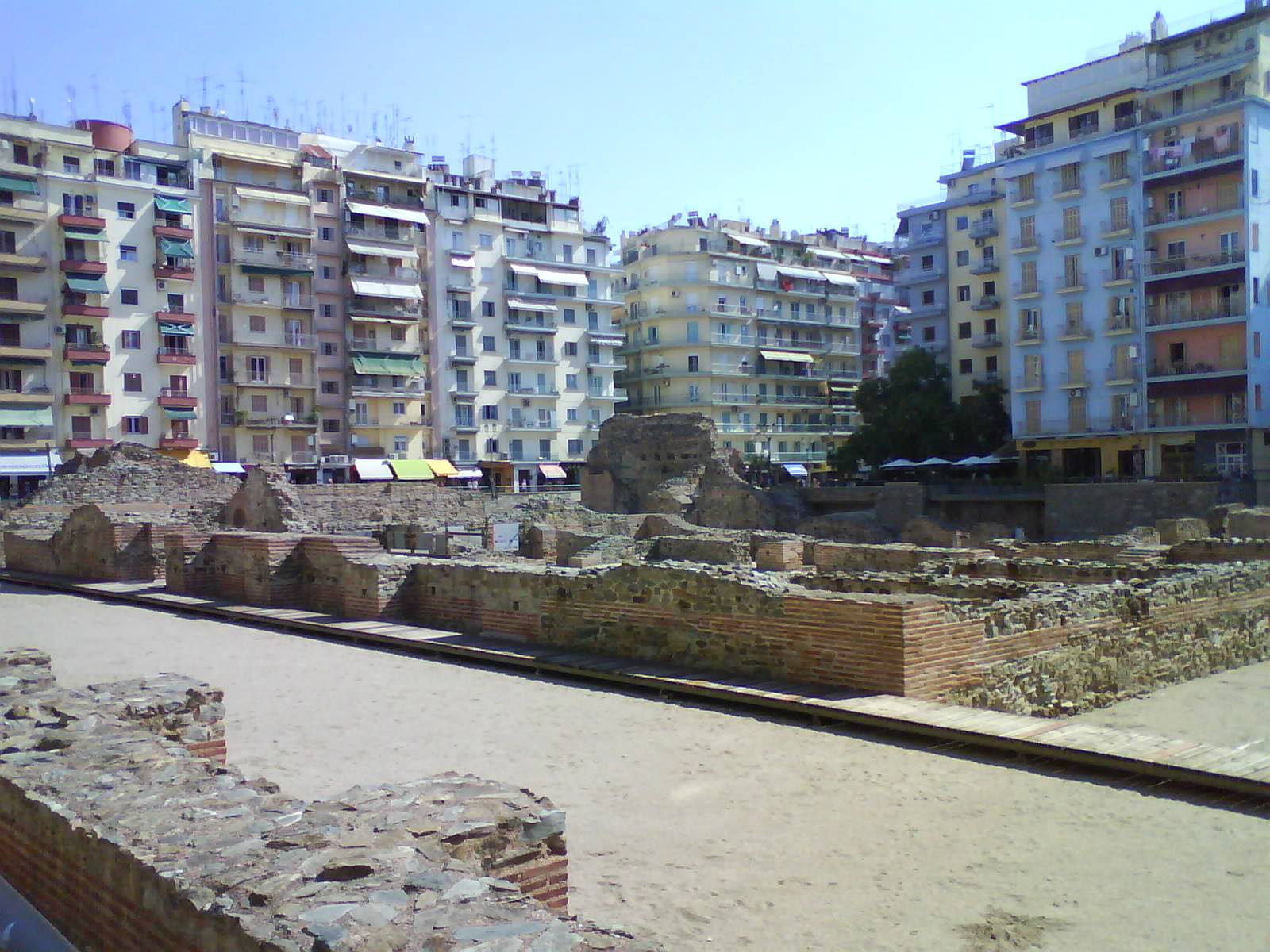
The Palace of Galerius in Thessaloniki (Navarinou Square), near the Hippodromus, where the massacre allegedly took place.

Many contemporary scholars, such as historian C. W. R. Larson, are skeptical of the story. There are a limited number of pagan histories from the period, but there is no mention of the Thessalonican massacre at all in those histories. The biggest problem, according to Stanley Lawrence Greenslade, is not the absence of information, it is that the story of the Massacre of Thessalonica moved into art and literature in the form of legend almost immediately.

Washburn says that determining what really happened at Thessalonica has "vexed" scholars, and McLynn says it is almost impossible to reconstruct. Stanislav Doležal says these problems begin with the sources not being contemporaneous; instead, they come from the fifth century church historians Sozomen, Theodoret the bishop of Cyrrhus, Socrates of Constantinople and Rufinus. Sozomen wrote Historia ecclesiastica around 442, which includes a detailed account of the events that is considered the most reliable. According to Doležal, Theodoret wrote the lengthiest but also the least reliable account. These events occurred within Rufinus' lifetime, but his Historia ecclesiastica (II,18) has only a short and somewhat confusing description, while Socrates makes no mention of it at all.

Paulinus, Ambrose' personal secretary, wrote a biography of Ambrose in the fifth century, The Life of Ambrose (Vita Ambrosii). In it, chapter 7 discusses the massacre, but exclusively from Ambrose' perspective. There are also two direct sources from Ambrose, but they include no description of the massacre. Augustine of Hippo, mentions the massacre in his fifth century work, The City of God, but only briefly. There are also 6 later histories, but they use the fifth-century works as sources, and as a result, are unable to add anything scholars see as dependable.

All these accounts are plausible, but they also had a method and purpose that makes Washburn question them: they were written "to evoke appreciation for ecclesial action and imperial piety". McLynn explains that this political event was quickly transformed in the Christian historiography of the time into a moral lesson where "the surviving sources always present the story... in the context of Theodosius' repentance". The second problem in attempting to interpret historical reliability is that these sources do not give a unified account, and in many respects, are mutually exclusive.

=== Theodosius' role ===
Theodosius was not in Thessalonica when the massacre occurred, the court was in Milan, and it is unclear whether he ordered or simply permitted the massacre or if the troops got out of control. Historian G. W. Bowersock, and authors Stephen Williams and Gerard Friell think that Theodosius ordered the massacre in an excess of "volcanic anger", "choler" and "wrath". McLynn also puts all the blame on the Emperor. Church historian Theodoret holds the emperor's temper accountable, saying:

The anger of the Emperor rose to the highest pitch, and he gratified his vindictive desire for vengeance by unsheathing the sword most unjustly and tyrannically against all, slaying the innocent and guilty alike. It is said seven thousand perished without any forms of law, and without even having judicial sentence passed upon them; but that, like ears of wheat in the time of harvest, they were alike cut down.

Hebblewhite says "Butheric held a very senior military position...and his death represented a direct threat to the authority of the emperor", but Hebblewhite does not think Theodosius ordered the massacre in hasty anger, arguing instead that there was a time lapse between Butheric's death and the massacre of at least three months. Historian N. Q. King says the Emperor may very well have been angry at first, but he would not have made a decision until his anger had passed and he was thinking clearly. Doležal also argues for the unlikelihood of Theodosius ordering the massacre in a fit of rage. He references Peter Brown, who points to the empire's established process of decision making, which required the emperor "to listen to his ministers" before acting. Thessalonica was an important city populated largely by Nicene Christians, most of whom would have been totally innocent of the crime, and Theodosius and his advisors would have known that. In Doležal's view, Theodosius must have listened to advice from the counselors in Milan with him, but what advice he received is unclear.

Ambrose, Paulinus, Augustine and Theodoret, (but not Rufinus or Sozomen) either imply or openly declare that the Emperor was somehow misled or duped in his decision by his officials. Ambrose is quite enigmatic, speaking of the “deceit of others”, which caused the Emperor’s guilt (deflevit in ecclesia publice peccatum suum, quod ei aliorum fraude obrepserat), while Paulinus only mentions some “secret negotiations of the officers with the Emperor”, with which Augustine concurs, adding that Theodosius was “compelled by the urgency of certain of his intimates” (tumultu quorundam, qui ei cohaerebant). Sozomen knows of no such involvement, and the church historian Rufinus blamed no persons either, but a “demon” instead (subreptione quadam daemonis).

One possible alternative explanation of events is that the troops lost control of the situation. Doležal writes: "Working on the conflicting sources, J. F. Matthews argues that the Emperor first tried to punish the city by selective executions... Peter Brown concurs: 'As it was, what was probably planned as a selective killing ... got out of hand'." According to Doležal, the massacre took place in the hippodrome and not all over the city. Sozomen is very specific, Doleźal adds, saying that in response to the riot, the soldiers made random arrests in the hippodrome to perform public executions there, and the citizenry objected. "The soldiers, realizing that they were surrounded by angry citizens, perhaps panicked and did what they were trained to: they forcibly cleared the hippodrome at the cost of several thousands of lives of local inhabitants. If Paulinus is right, the massacre lasted just over an hour, which is quite enough for such an operation".

McLynn says Theodosius was “unable to impose discipline upon the faraway troops [and] was compelled by the much-proclaimed myth of imperial omnipotence to accept [responsibility for the massacre himself]. The best face he could put upon the situation was of a hasty order countermanded too late". Doleźal acknowledges that, in letter 51, "Ambrose explicitly speaks of the massacre that "you yourself consider to be grave by revoking it too late" (et quod ipse sero revocando grave factum putasti)". This story may have been what Ambrose received from his informant, but Doleźal doubts that revocation of an imperial order is what actually happened.

One peculiarity of the story is that there is no record in any of the sources of a criminal investigation or other attempt to track down the culprits responsible for Butheric's death. Yet, Theodosius had carefully crafted a public image of an emperor with "a love of mankind". This inconsistency leads scholars like Wolfe Liebeschuetz and Carole Hill to call these events "unprecedented".

== Aftermath ==
Scholars such as Boniface Ramsey think the massacre occurred during a period when Ambrose was banned from Theodosius' presence. As Ambrose himself says in letter 51, "I alone of all at your court have been stripped of the natural right of hearing, with the consequence that I have also been deprived of the power of speaking". Ramsey says Theodosius had become annoyed and sent Ambrose away when the emperor became aware Ambrose was being informed of "confidential decisions of the imperial consistory". Sozomen says Ambrose left the court claiming illness after he heard of the massacre. Whatever the reason for his absence, sources agree Ambrose hadn't been there to offer counsel when the riot and massacre occurred, nor was he present in its immediate aftermath.

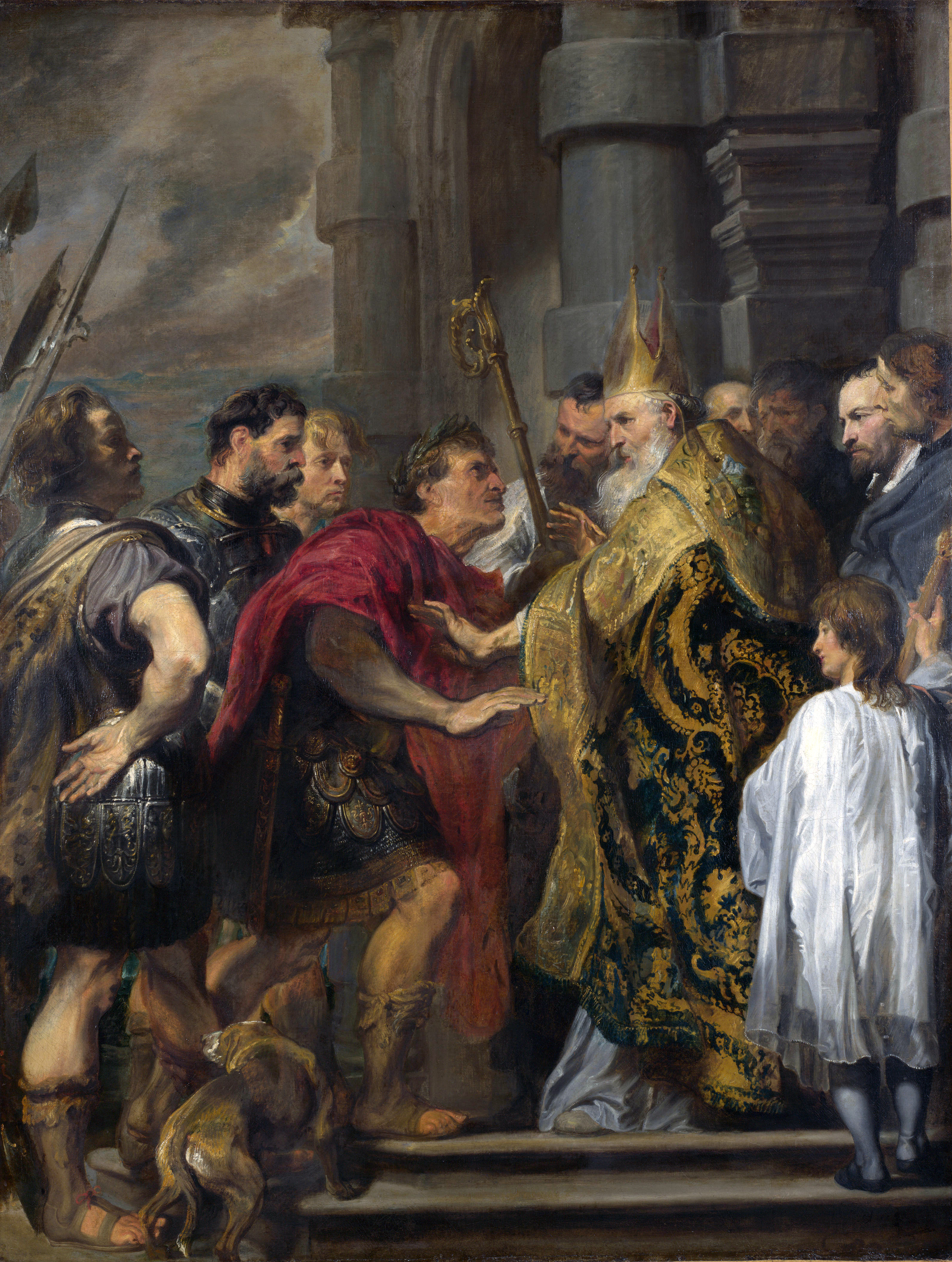
Anthonis Van Dyke's 1619 painting of St. Ambrose blocking the cathedral door, refusing Theodosius' admittance. Saint Ambrose barring Theodosius from Milan Cathedral

At some point, Ambrose was informed of events. He responded by writing Theodosius a personal and private letter. According to McLynn, this still existing letter is "unusually" tactful for Ambrose, and it offers a different way for the emperor to "save face" and restore his image. Theodosius' concern for his public image being one of personal piety is well attested. Ambrose urges a semi-public penitence, using the example of David and Uriah, telling the emperor that he cannot give Theodosius communion until he demonstrates repentance for the massacre. Wolf Liebeschuetz says "Theodosius duly complied and came to church without his imperial robes, until Christmas, when Ambrose openly admitted him to communion".

From the time Edward Gibbon wrote his The Decline and Fall of the Roman Empire, Ambrose' action after–the–fact has been cited as an example of the church's dominance over the state in Antiquity. John Moorhead says these events are seen as "marking important victories of church over state". Alan Cameron observes that Theodosius' actions are often explained in terms of his falling under the dominating influence of Bishop Ambrose, which, Cameron says, is "often spoken of as though documented fact". Indeed, he says, "the assumption is so widespread it would be superfluous to cite authorities. But there is not a shred of evidence for Ambrose exerting any such influence over Theodosius".

Brown notes that Ambrose was not, in actuality, guaranteed success with his letter. He had been denied access to the emperor and denied other requests before. Brown says Ambrose was just one among many advisors, and Cameron says there is no evidence Theodosius favored him above anyone else. While McLynn asserts that the relationship between Theodosius and Ambrose was transformed into myth within a generation of their deaths, he also observes that the documents that reveal the relationship between Ambrose and Theodosius seem less about any purported personal friendship and more like negotiations between the institutions the two men represent: the Roman state and the Italian church.

Washburn says the image of the mitered prelate braced in the door of the cathedral in Milan blocking Theodosius from entering is a product of the imagination of Theodoret; he wrote of the events of 390 (probably sometime between 449 and 455) "using his own ideology to fill the gaps in the historical record". Peter Brown also says there was no dramatic encounter at the church door. McLynn states that "the encounter at the church door has long been known as a pious fiction". Ambrose advocated a course of action which avoided the kind of public humiliation Theodoret describes, and that is the course Theodosius chose.

=== Disputed dates and a questioned law ===
Malcolm Errington has observed that "it is universally accepted that the incident happened in 390", but no source actually mentions a year. The only internal chronological reference in any source is in Theodoret who says Theodosius celebrated Christmas in the church eight months after Ambrose had demanded penance from him. In 388 Theodosius was in Italy only in October, November and December, and in 391, he was gone from Italy by July, but he was in Milan in both 389 and 390. Both Theodoret and Sozomen say the confrontation with Ambrose took place after Theodosius arrived in Milan, which seems to point to 389, except that Theodosius spent almost three months (June to September) in Rome in 389, making 390 more likely.

In August of 390, Theodosius is alleged to have issued a law ordering a 30-day wait between an order for capital punishment and its actual execution. Peter Brown says Theodosius wrote the law because he wanted to "take the wind out of Ambrose' sails" in the face of Ambrose' demand for penitence. MacMullen says that the law "represented the will of its bishop, Ambrose". According to Doležal, Theodosius was forced by Ambrose to enact the law before being allowed to "rejoin the Christian community". However, this is not in Ambrose's letter, and an inability to take the Eucharist would not prevent participation in worship or community. Doleźal explains that "the law in question seems to be CTh IX,40,13" which has come down to the modern day with a date of 18 August 382; it has been "inferred that the date is wrong and should be corrected to 390".

There is no consensus on whether this law was issued in 390, and if it was, whether it had anything to do with the massacre or not. Errington argues that the law was issued in 382 and had nothing to do with the massacre of Thessalonica. Peter Brown claims that the law was issued in 390, but that it was unrelated to the massacre of Thessalonica: "The law envisioned notables held in prison, not the innocent population of a whole city". T. Honoré supports 390, but is cautious, saying: "The law is only loosely connected with the massacre". J. F. Mathews argues for 390, explaining that he firmly believes in the connection between these events and the law.

== See also ==
- List of massacres in Greece
- History of Thessaloniki
- Massacre at Béziers (1209)

== Bibliography ==
- A. Lippold: Theodosius der Große und seine Zeit. 2nd ed., München 1980, p. 40ff.
- J. Norwich, Byzantium: The Early Centuries, p. 112.
- E. Gibbon, The Decline and Fall of the Roman Empire, ch.27 2:56
- A. Demandt: Magister Militum. In: Pauly-Wissowa. Paulys Realencyclopädie der classischen Altertumswissenschaft (neue Bearbeitung). Supplementband XII, Sp. 717 - Butherichh and Theodosius

See also:

- P. Heather, Goths and Romans, 332-489. Oxford 1991, p. 184.
- A. Schwarz, Reichsangehörige Personen gotischer Herkunft. Wien 1984, s.v. Butherichus.

Primary fifth century sources for this event:

- Theodoret, Historia ecclesiastica 5.17
- Sozomenus, Historia ecclesiastica 7.25.1-7
- Cassiodorus, Historia ecclesiastica 9.30
- Ambrose, epistola 51
- Ambrose, De obitu Theodosii 34

Later historical works:

- Joannes Malalas, Chronographia 13.43
- Theophanes the Confessor, Chronographia 1.72-3
- Cedrenus, Compendium historiarum 1.556-9
- Joannes Zonaras, Epitome historiarum 13.18.
