= Tourism in Greece =

Tourism in Greece has been a key element of the economic activity in the country, and is one of the country's most important sectors. Greece has been a major tourist destination and attraction in Europe since the 1970s for its rich culture and history, which is reflected in large part by its 21 UNESCO World Heritage Sites, among the most in Europe and the world as well as for its long coastline, many islands, and beaches. Greece attracted 40.7 million inbound travelers in 2024, while travel receipts reached 21.59 billion euros, according to the Bank of Greece.

Greece is one of Europe's most popular tourist destinations. The religious tourism and pilgrimages, the ecotourism, the conference tourism, and the medical tourism are prominent, and initiatives are being made to promote the seasonal tourism as well. Some of the country's major tourist destinations include the capital city Athens, the islands of Santorini, Mykonos, Rhodes, Corfu and Crete, as well as the peninsula of Chalkidice.

== History ==
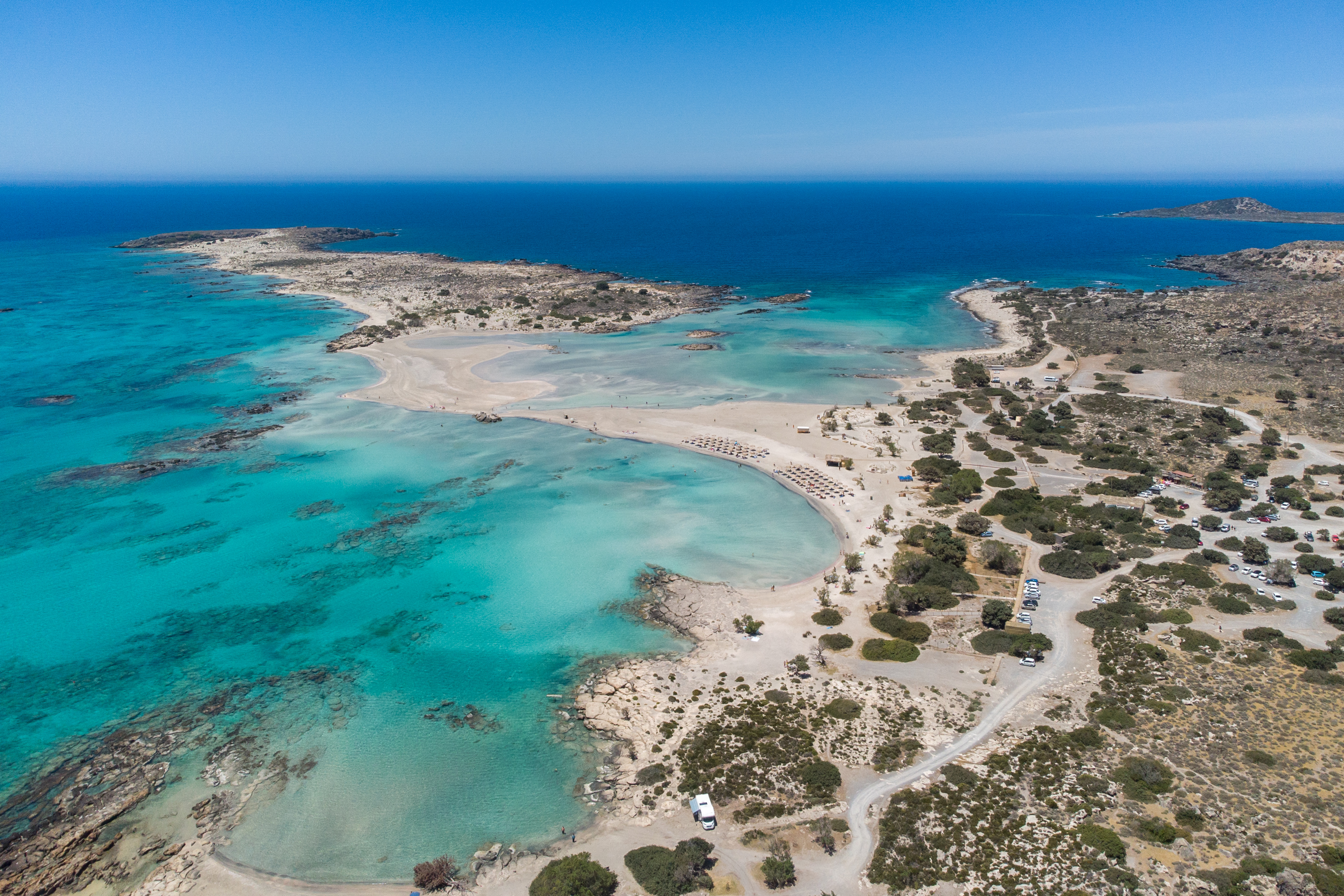
Elafonisi or Elafonisos beach, south-west of Crete. It is world-famous for its pink sand beaches, shallow turquoise waters and exotic scenery. (C messier, May 2021, CC BY-SA 4.0)

Tourism in Greece traces its roots to ancient times. Cultural exchange took place between the Greek colonies of Magna Graeca and the young Roman Republic before Rome's rise to dominance of the Western Mediterranean. When Greece was annexed by the Roman Empire centuries later, the cultural exchange that started between the two civilizations triggered as a result a large number of ancient Roman tourists visiting the famous centers of Greek philosophy and science, such as Athens, Corinth and Thebes, partly because Greece had become a province of the Roman Empire and Greeks were granted Roman citizenship.

Tourism in modern-day Greece started to flourish in the 1960s and 1970s, in what became known as mass tourism. During that time, large-scale construction projects for hotels and other such facilities were undertaken, and the country saw an increase in international tourists over the years. International events such as the 2004 Summer Olympic Games and the Eurovision Song Contest 2006, both held in Athens, greatly helped to boost tourism in the country, while large-scale nationally funded cultural infrastructure such as the New Acropolis Museum also contributed to the flow of tourists in the country. Thessaloniki was the European Youth Capital in 2014.

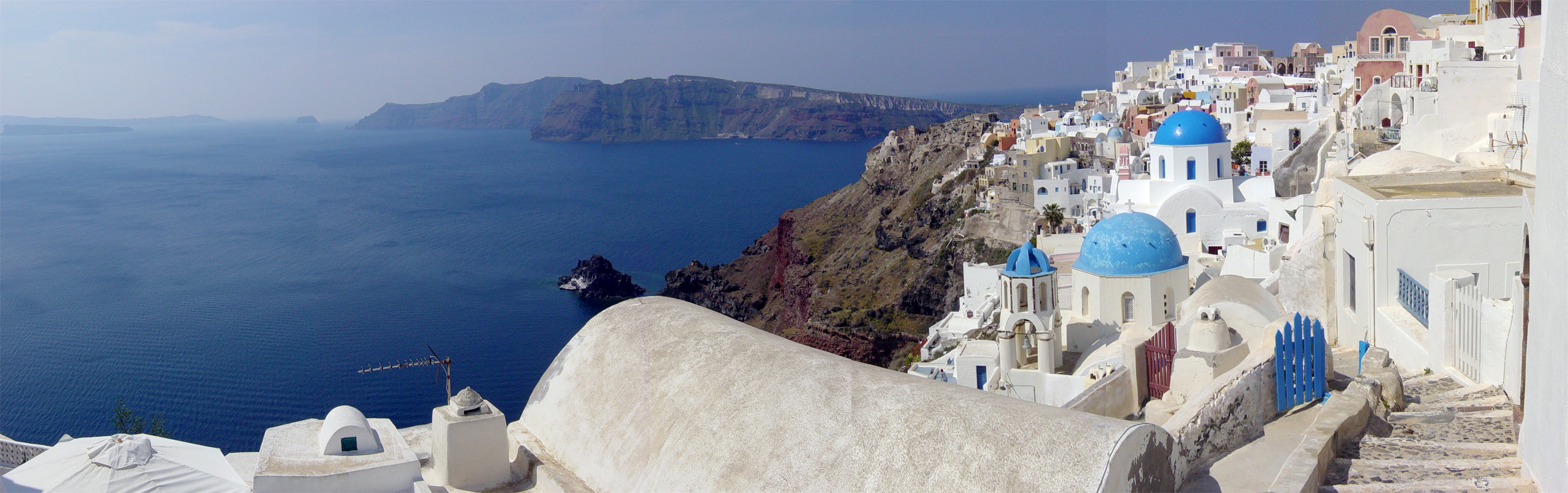
Panoramic view of the Santorini caldera, taken from Oia

== Land and climate ==
Greece has a Mediterranean climate along its coasts and islands. Once inland, many areas and cities experience a continental climate.

Summers are usually hot and dry, while winters are generally mild and wet. Northern Greece can experience cold winters, while Southern Greece and the islands experience considerably milder winters.

== Infrastructure ==
As a developed country highly dependent on tourism, Greece offers a wide variety of tourist facilities and several Greek state Mobile Apps for public support and services. Tourism infrastructure in Greece has been greatly improved since the 2004 Athens Olympic Games and continues to expand with a number of important projects particularly in areas of less mass-tourism. Each year, Greece receives many Blue Flag awards, a certification granted by the Foundation for Environmental Education (FEE) to organized beaches, marinas, or sustainable boating tourism operators that meet its high quality standards. Greece operates quiet hours schedule by law throughout the year, and Fire Ban Period (Anti-Fire period, fire is prohibited) to outdoor areas from 1 May to 31 October. In Greece, the legal age for purchasing and consuming alcoholic beverages, tobacco smoking, cigarette and heated tobacco products is 18 years old, the relevant legislation was strengthened in 2025 through Law 5216/2025. Specific Greek legislation and its updates also applies to certain purchases and services, including taxi services, sea bathing, goods and service purchased in cash, and other services.

=== Beach resorts ===
Beach resorts

Some popular beach resorts include Crete, Rhodes, Kos, Corfu, Kefalonia, Zakynthos and Skiathos attracting millions of foreign tourists every year. Athens will become the home to Greece’s first integrated resort when the Hard Rock Hotel & Casino Athens opens in 2027.

=== Hotels and facilities ===
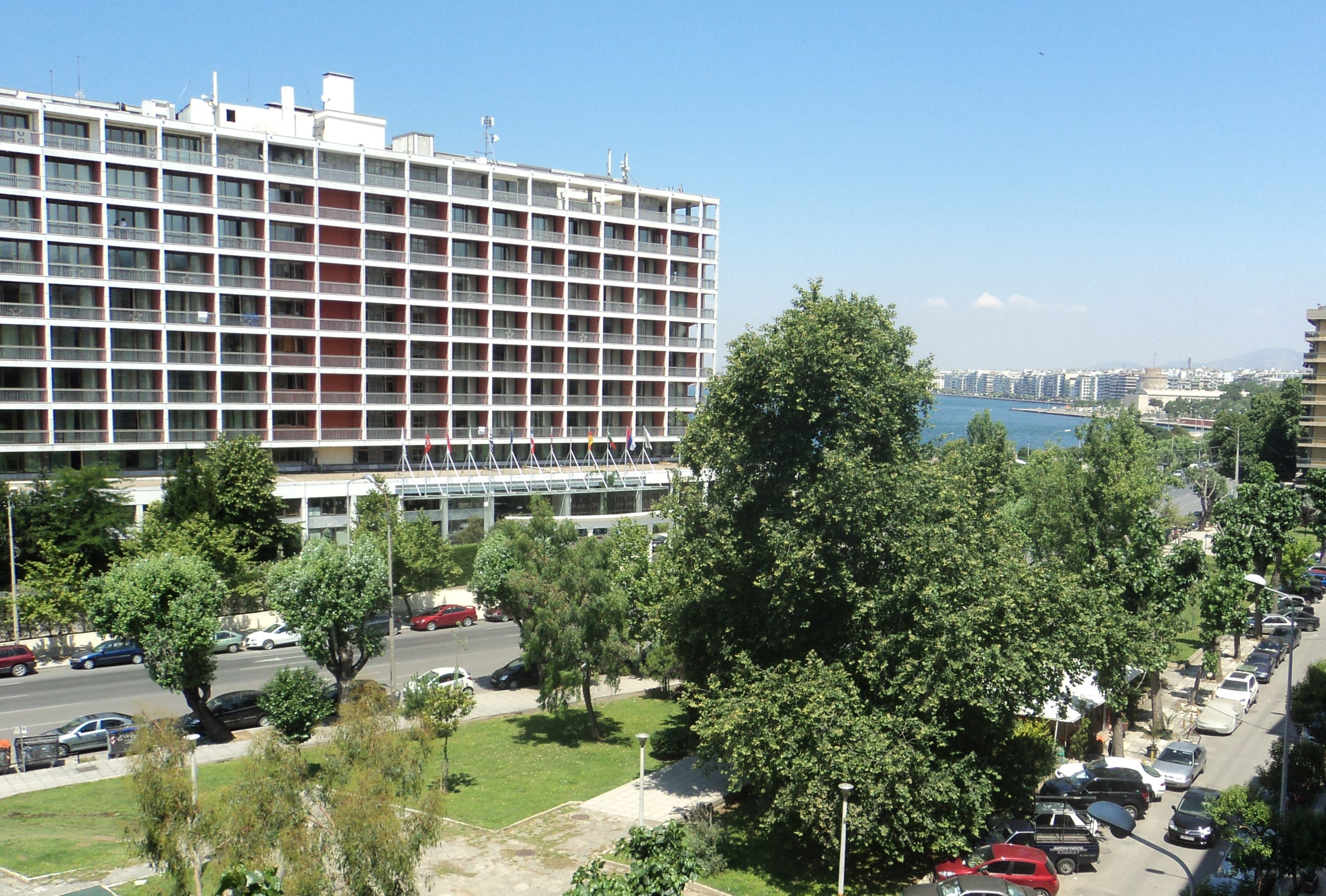
Makedonia Palace, Thessaloniki

Conrad Athens The Ilisian, Athens

Hotel Grande Bretagne, Athens

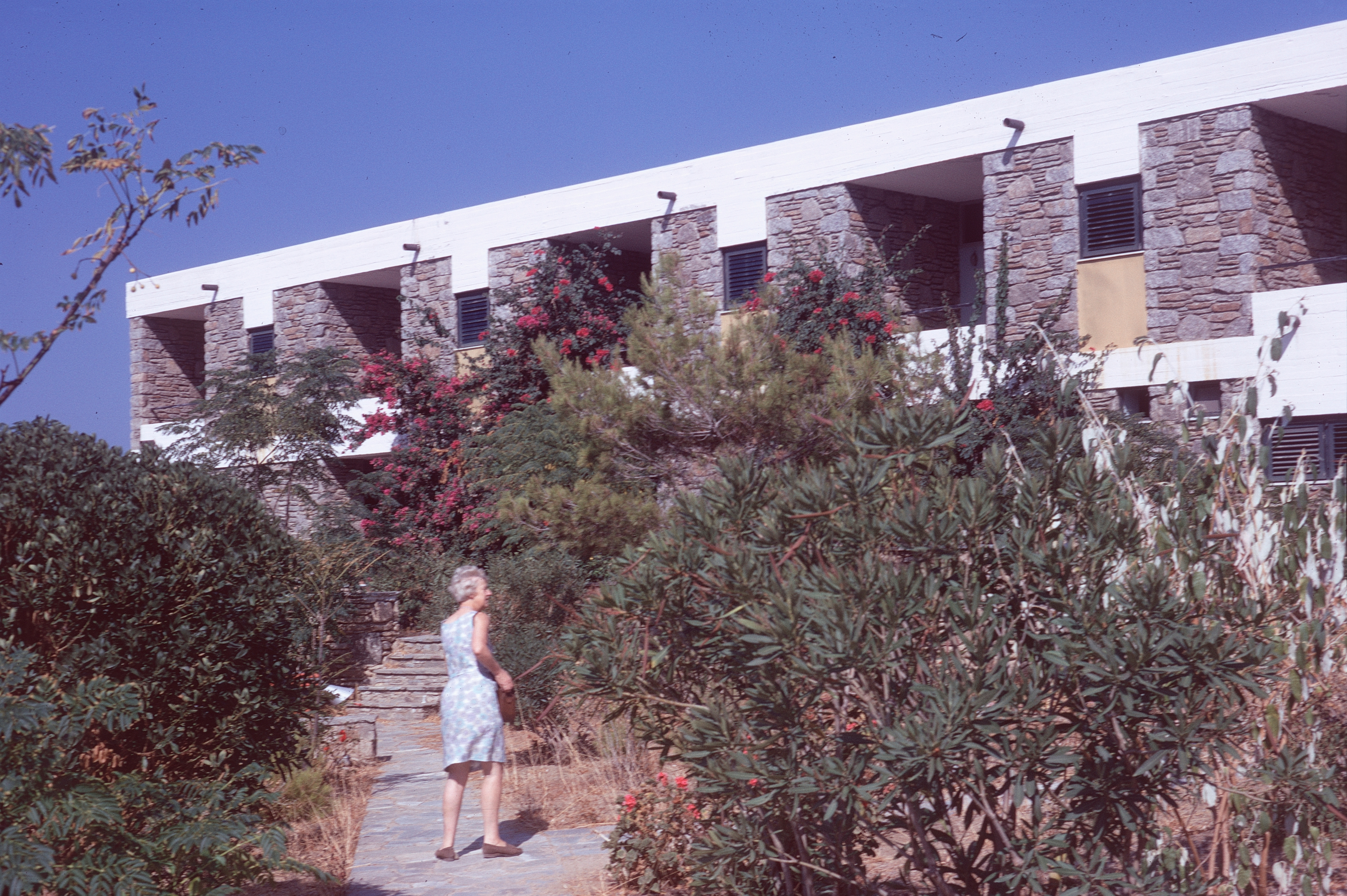
Mykonos Theoxenia, Mykonos

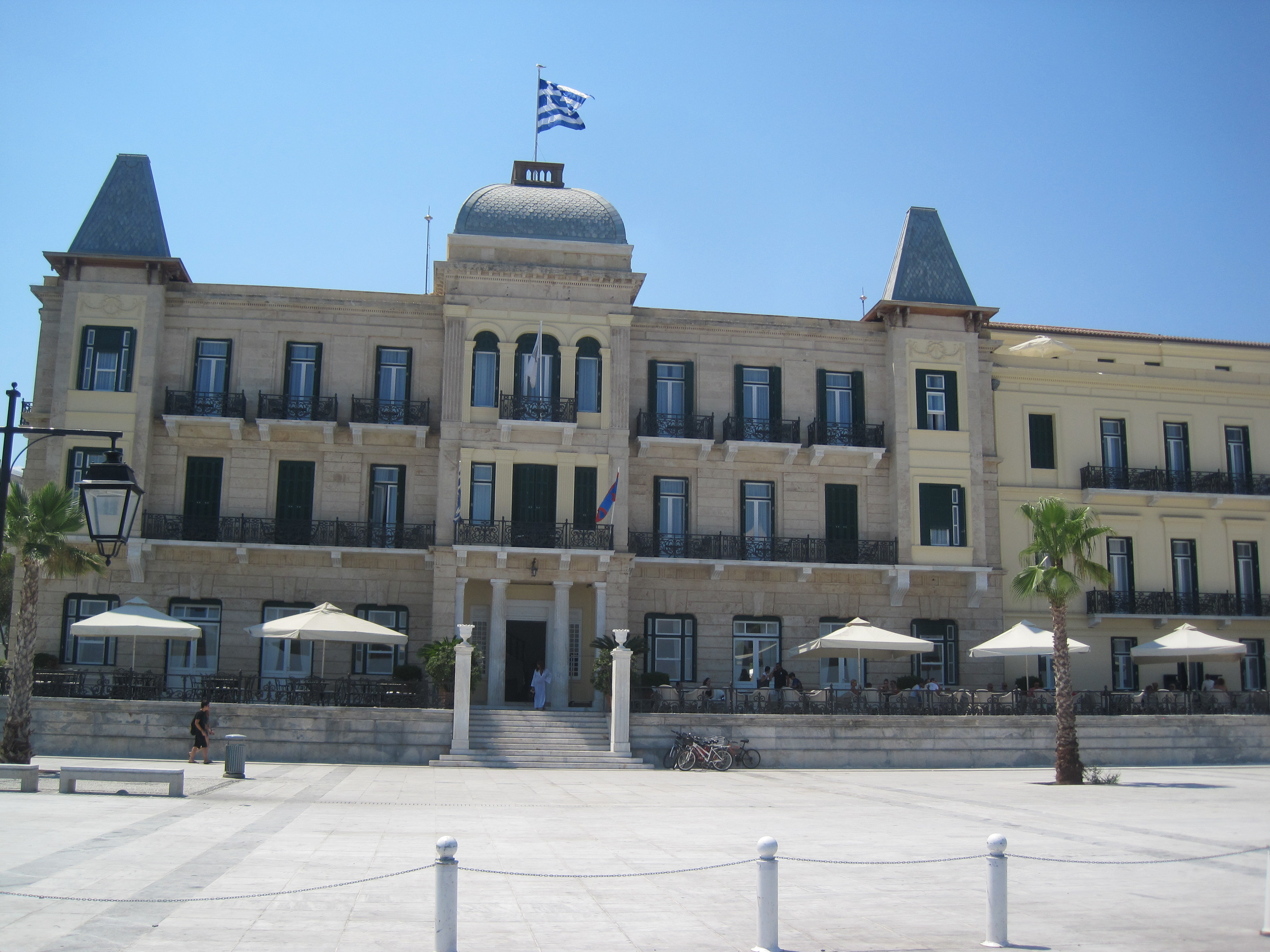
Poseidonion Grand Hotel, Spetses

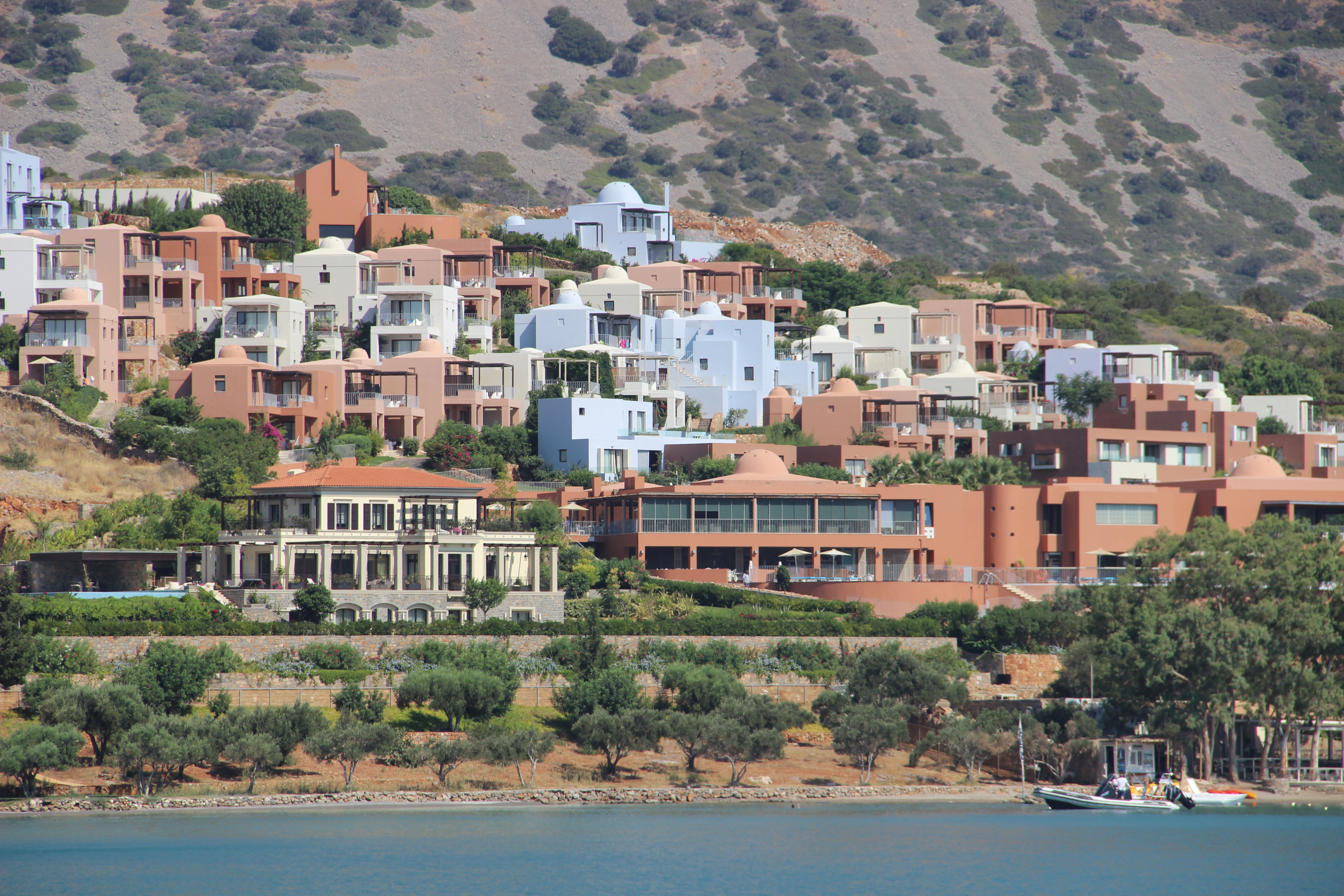
Blue Palace Resort, Elounda, Crete

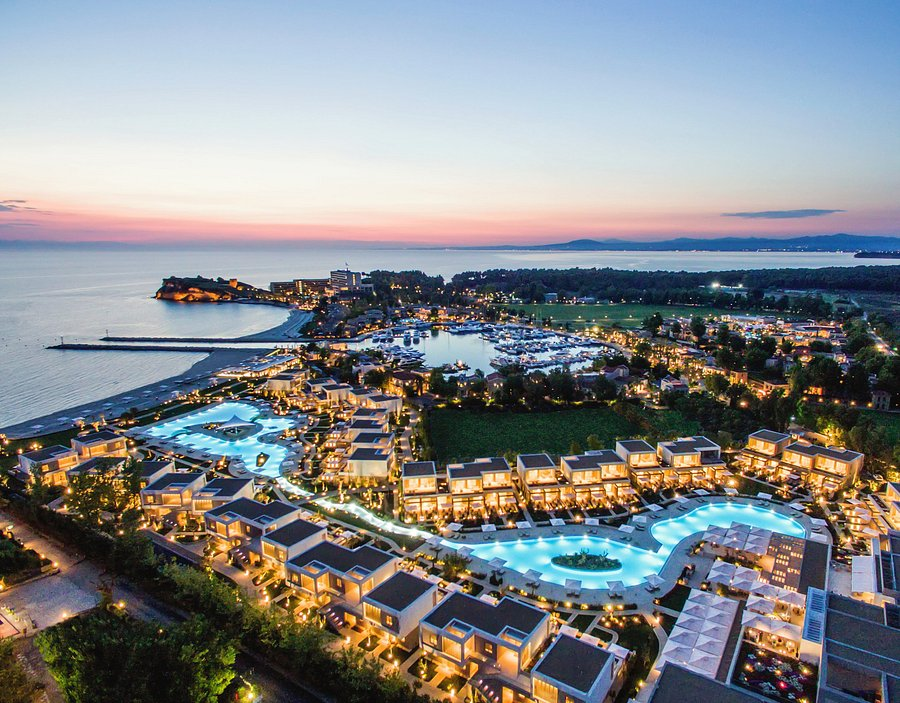
Sani Resort, Sani, Chalkidiki

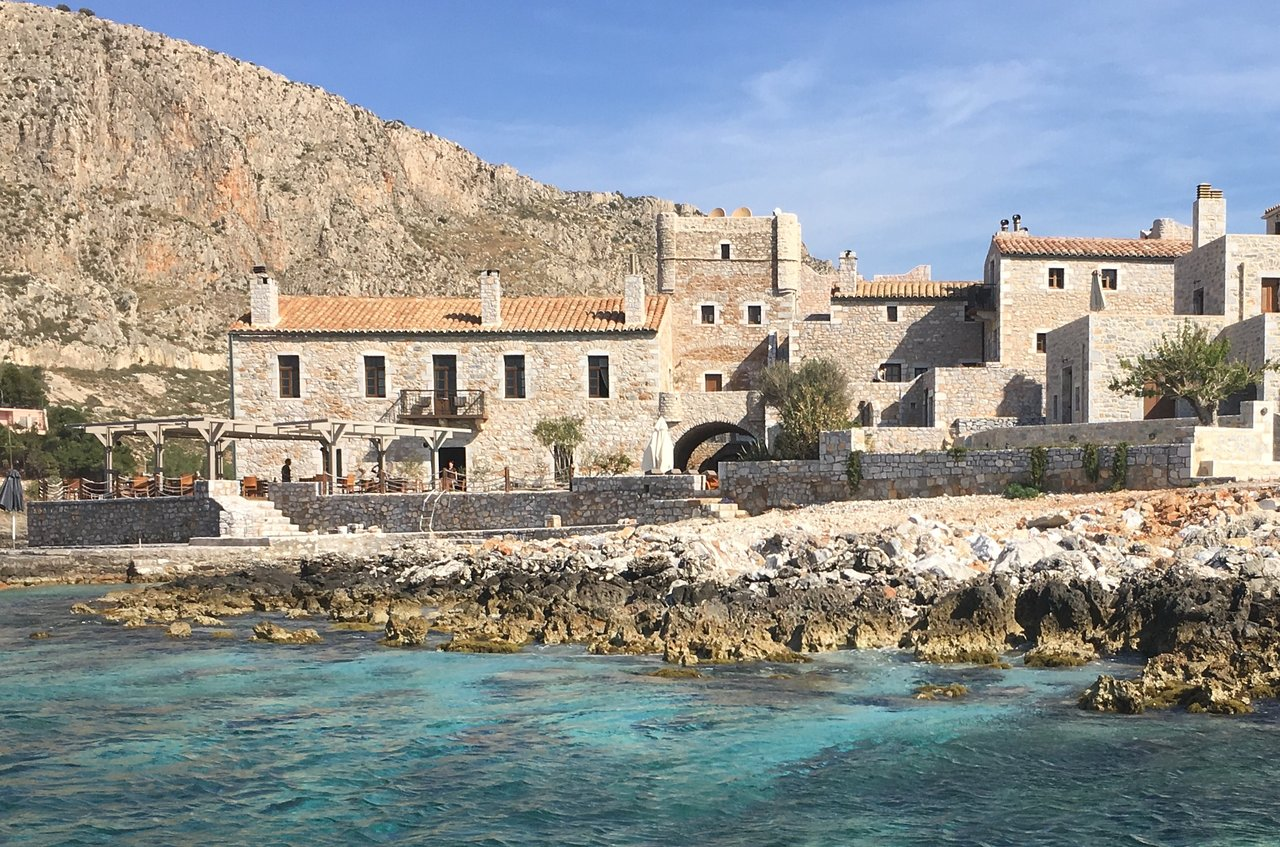
Kyrimai Hotel, Mani, Messinia

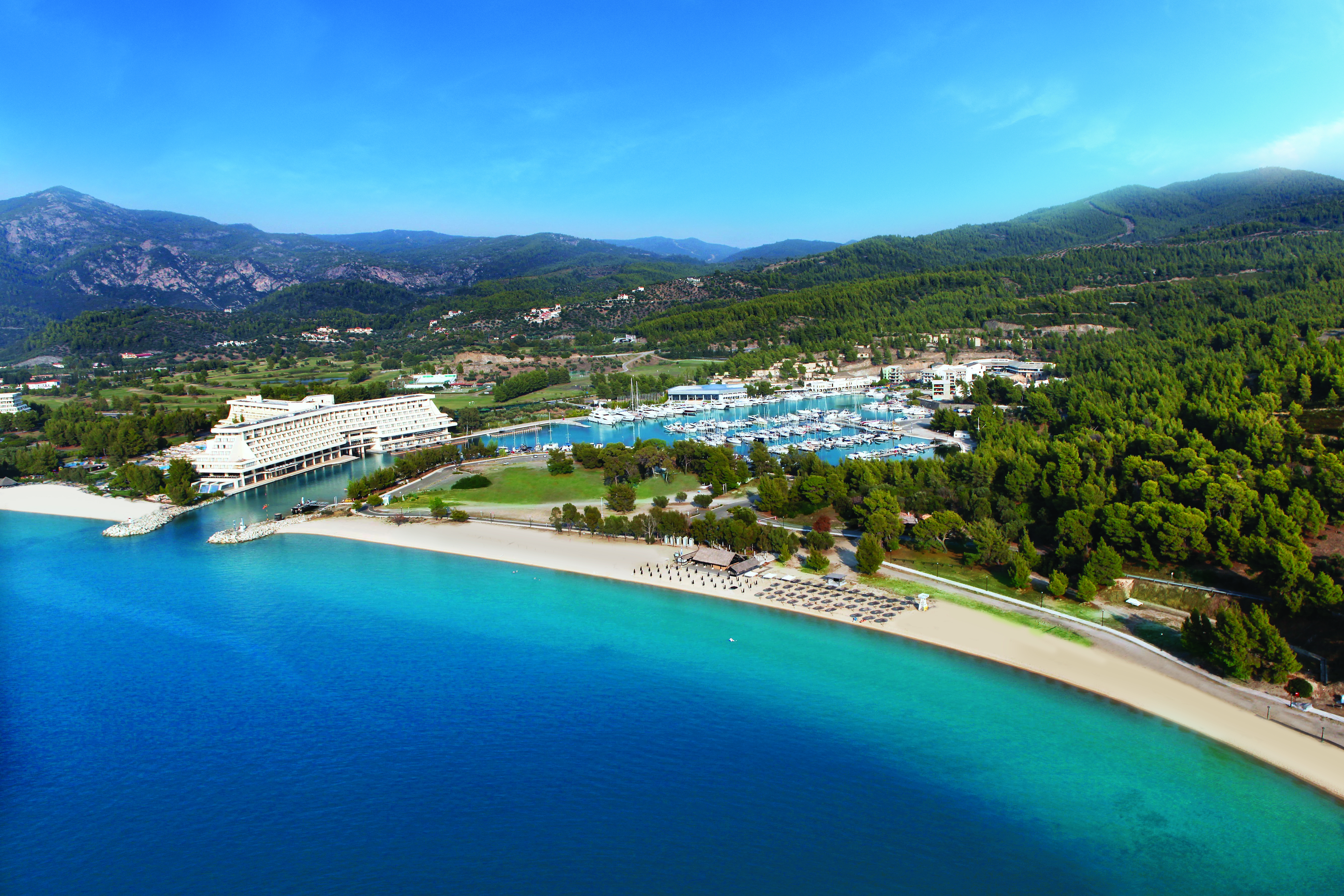
Porto Carras Hotel Resort in Chalkidiki hosted the European Union leader's summit in 2003

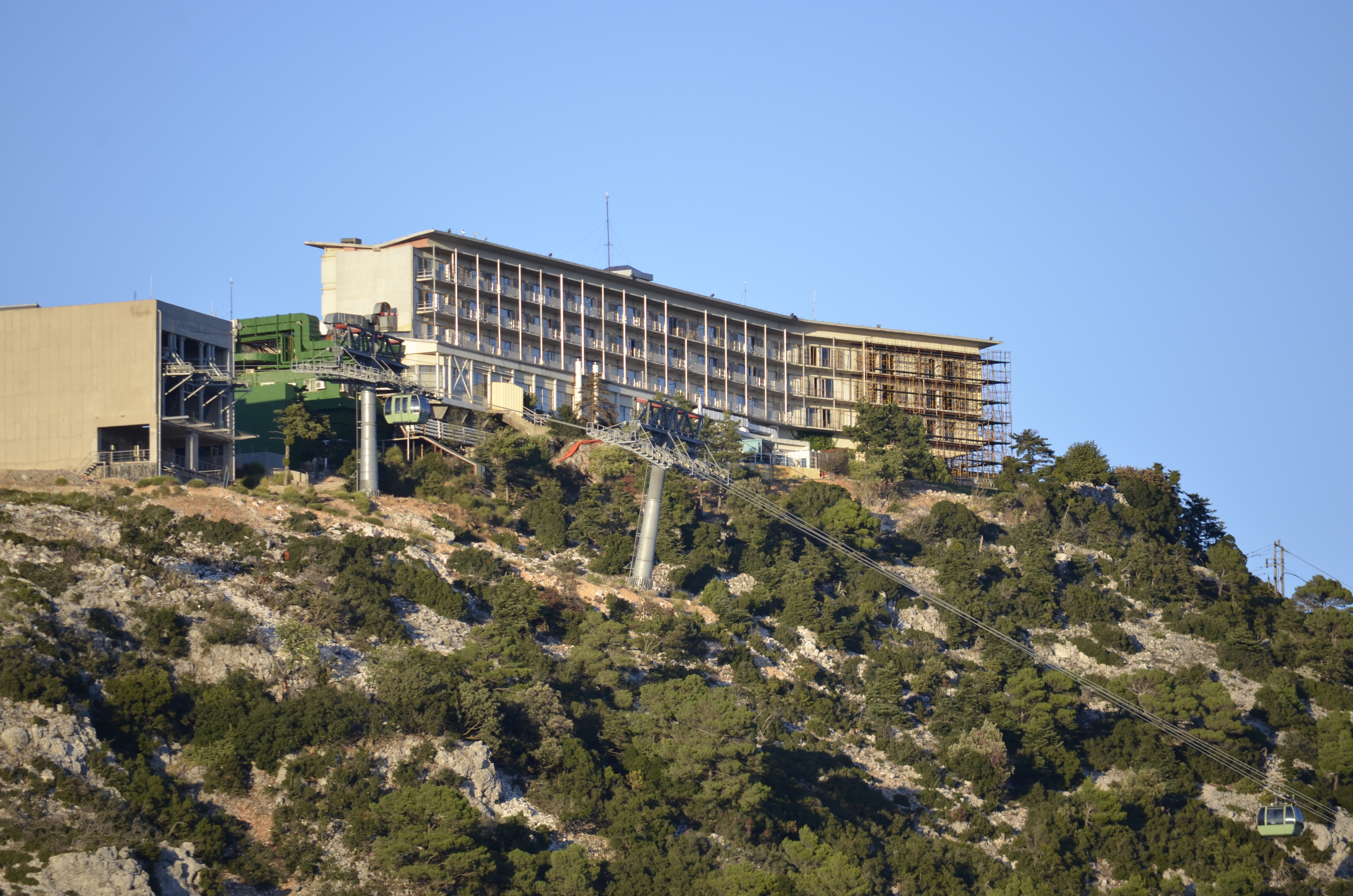
Regency Casino Mont Parnes at Mount Parnitha north of Athens

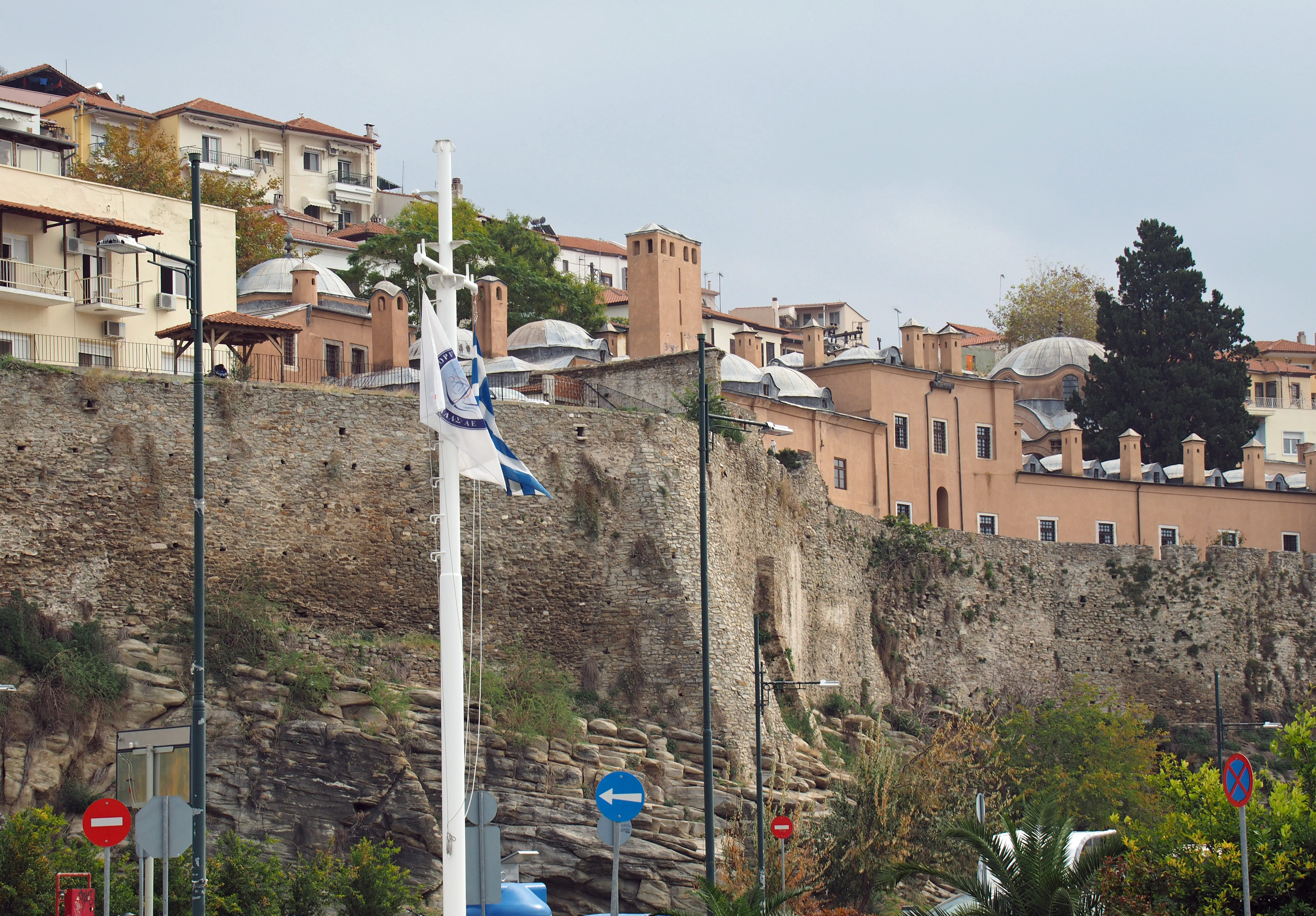
Imaret Hotel, Kavala

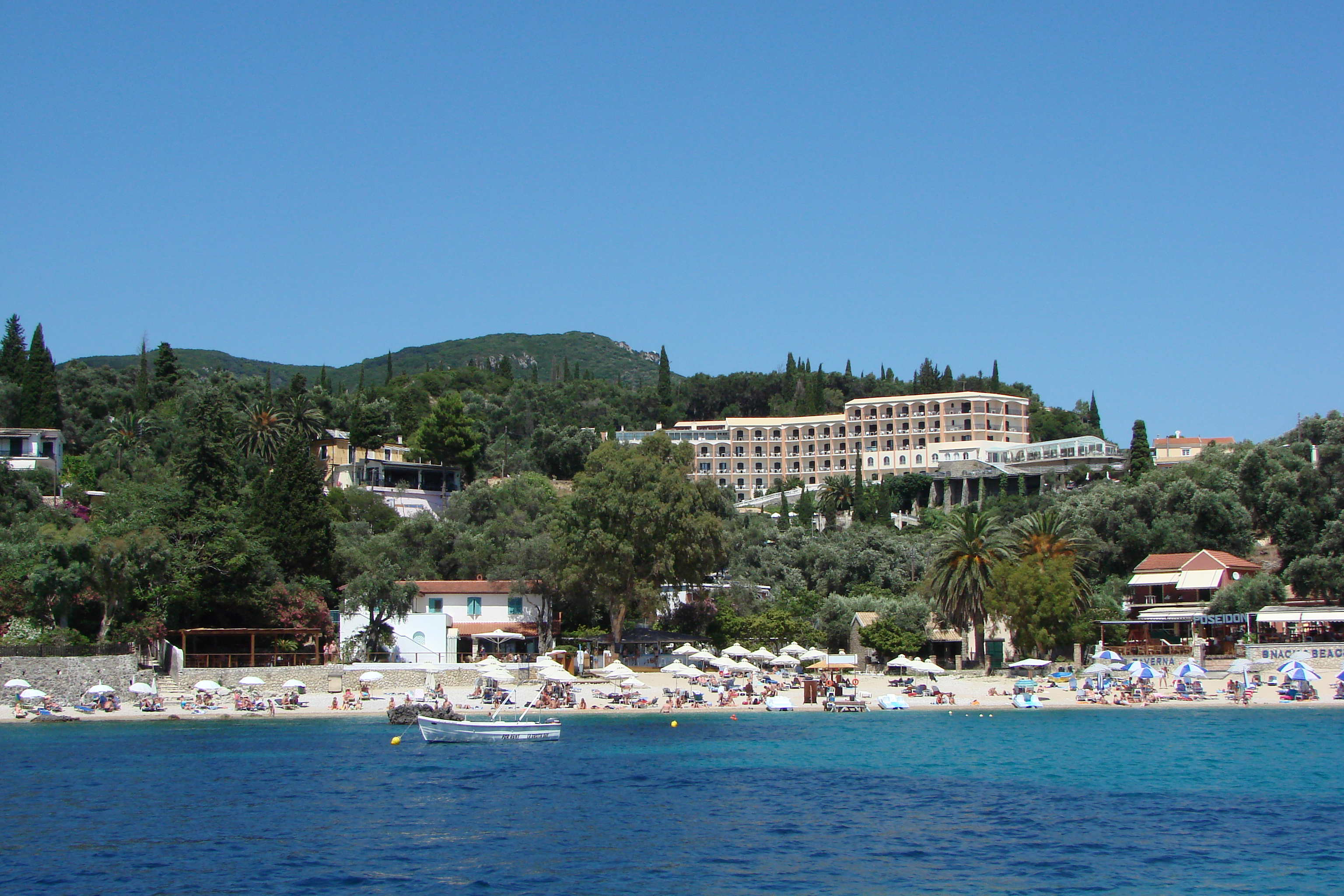
Hotel, Corfu

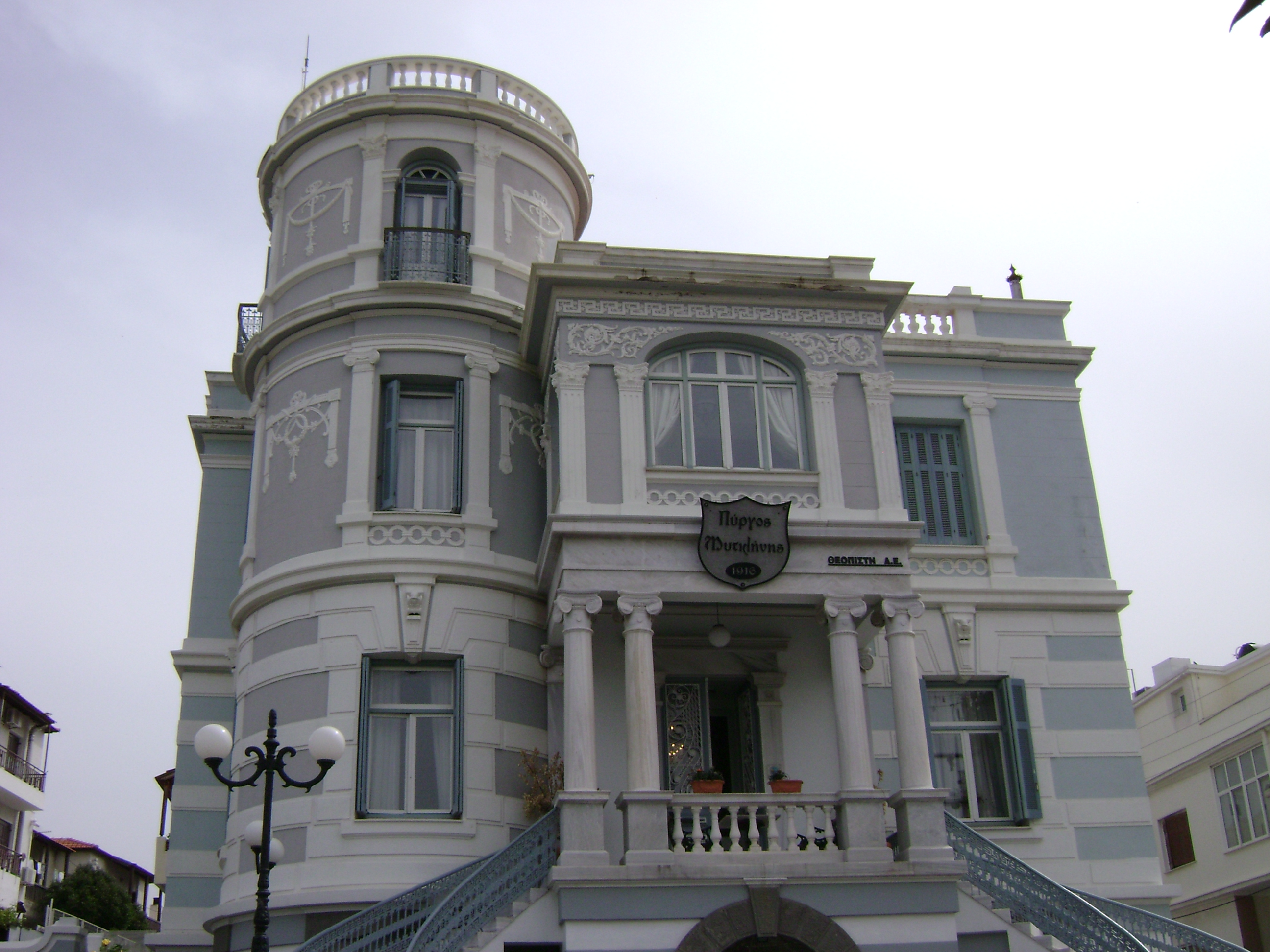
Hotel Pyrgos, Mytilene

According to the Hellenic Chamber of Hotels in 2016, the number of hotels in Greece was by classification (bedplaces):

Star rating	Number	Beds
5 star	444	137,210
4 star	1,412	203,203
3 star	2,472	185,560
2 star	3,990	210,365
1 star	1,412	52,215
Total	9,730	788,553

=== Marinas ===
Greece has 51 marinas and 14,661 mooring places that provide such services as berths, fuel, water and electricity, telephony, and repairs.

Some of the most developed and busiest marinas in Greece are just a few kilometres from the centre of Athens. The marinas of Alimos and Flisvos, on the south coast of Athens, have an aggregated capacity of more than 1,800 vessels.

=== Spas and thermal springs ===
Greece has 752 thermal springs. Many have been classified as therapeutic by the National Institute for Geographical and Mineral Research. Several of them were known and exploited already since antiquity. Thermal or curative tourism was, after all, one of the earliest forms of tourism in the ancient world. In 1983 was founded the Hellenic Association of Municipalities with Thermal Springs. Some of these ancient "spa resorts" were situated in Aidipsos, known from the time of Aristotle, Loutraki, mentioned by Xenophon, Traianoupoli, founded by the emperor Trajan in the 2nd century A.D., whereas some others are attested in the Byzantine period, such as the Thermal baths of Lagkadas. In the late 19th and the beginning of the 20th century these hot springs were surrounded by cosmopolitan facilities, namely hotels and restaurants, whereas several prominent members of the society of both the Modern Greek State and the Ottoman State (for regions still incorporated in it) invested in touristic infrastructure and private estates. Thermal tourism became particularly widespread in the 1960s and 1970s, whereas in the 1980s it was widely supported by a social tourism program, which subsidized large part of the expenses for the elderly users of the facilities. Nowadays, however, there is an urgent need to refurbish, restore and elevate these spas to modern standards and create an international clientele. Visitors, however, can already find high-standard touristic facilities in Pozar, in Aidipsos, and in Kamena Vourla, in Loutraki close to Corinth, as well as at Kaiafas, on the western shores of the Peloponnese. A detailed List of spa towns in Greece can give an insight in the inexorable richness of thermal springs of the country.

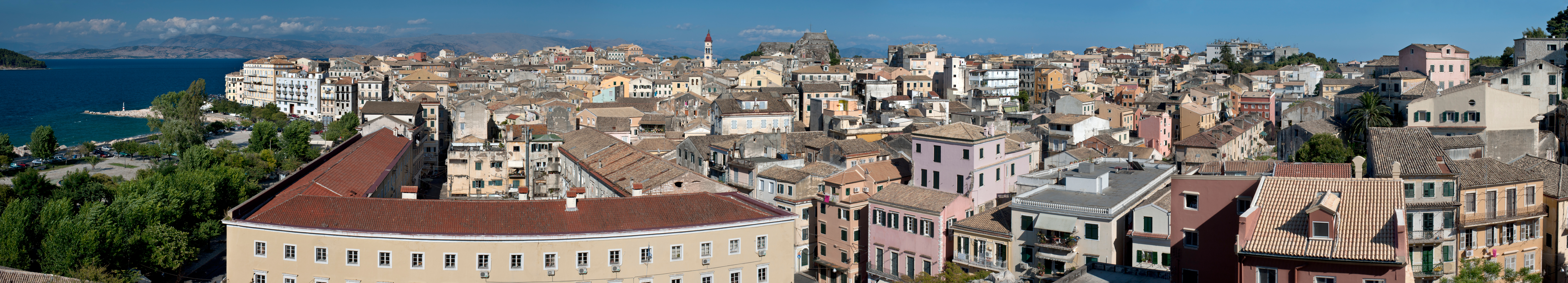
View of the city of Corfu

== Cultural attractions ==
=== Museums ===
Several kinds of museums are located in the Hellenic Republic. Generally speaking, every major city and town in Greece has its own Archaeological Museum, which houses findings from the nearby area. However, most of them can be found in the big cities like Athens, where the famous New Acropolis Museum and the National Archaeological Museum are located. Furthermore, there is a vast number of galleries like the National Gallery (Athens). There are many museums in Thessaloniki too, like the Byzantine Museum. Overall, there are approximately 150 museums all over the country which are easily accessible by tourists.

=== Archaeological sites and cities ===
Selection of significant archaeological sites and cities

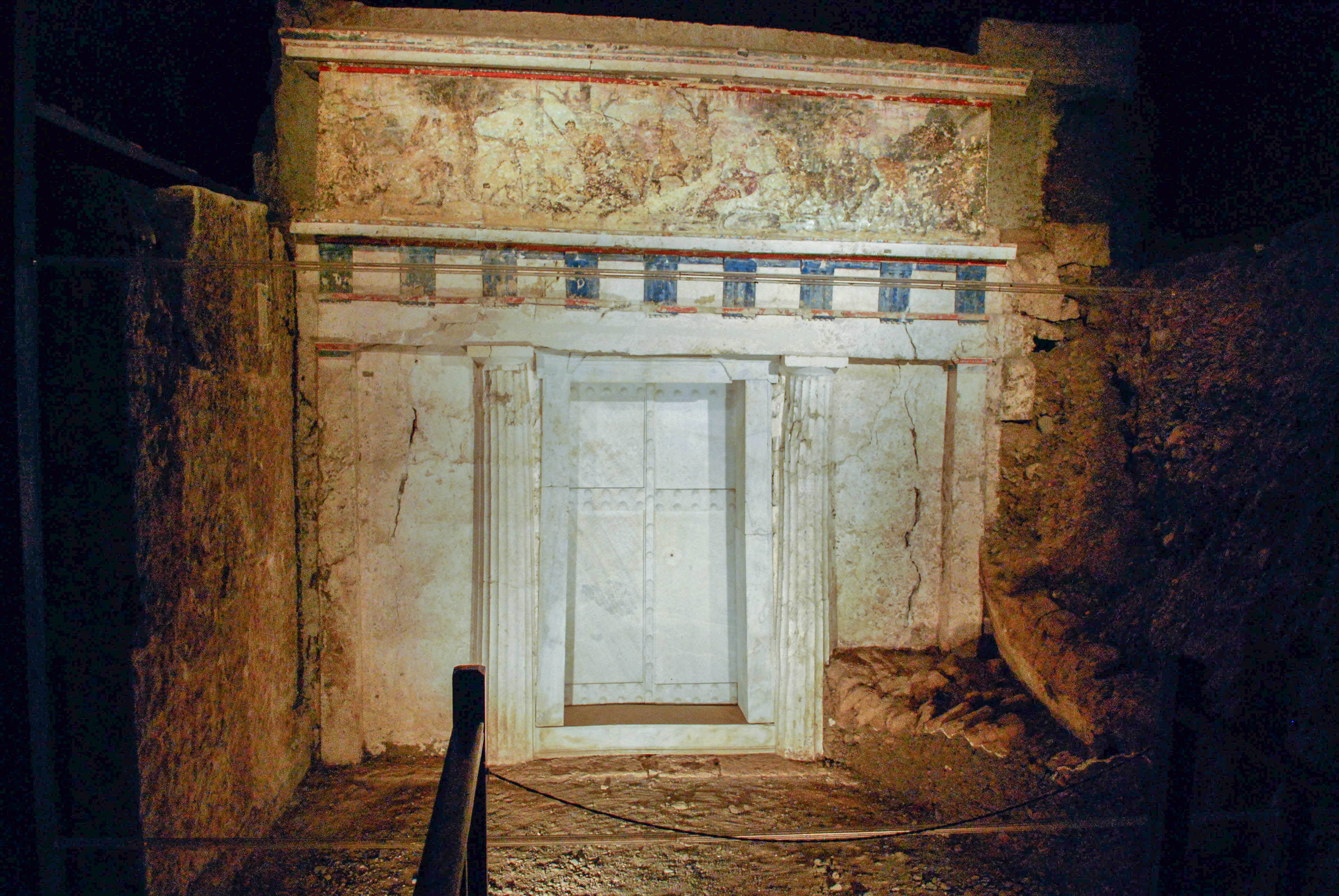
Tomb of Philip II of Macedon in Vergina

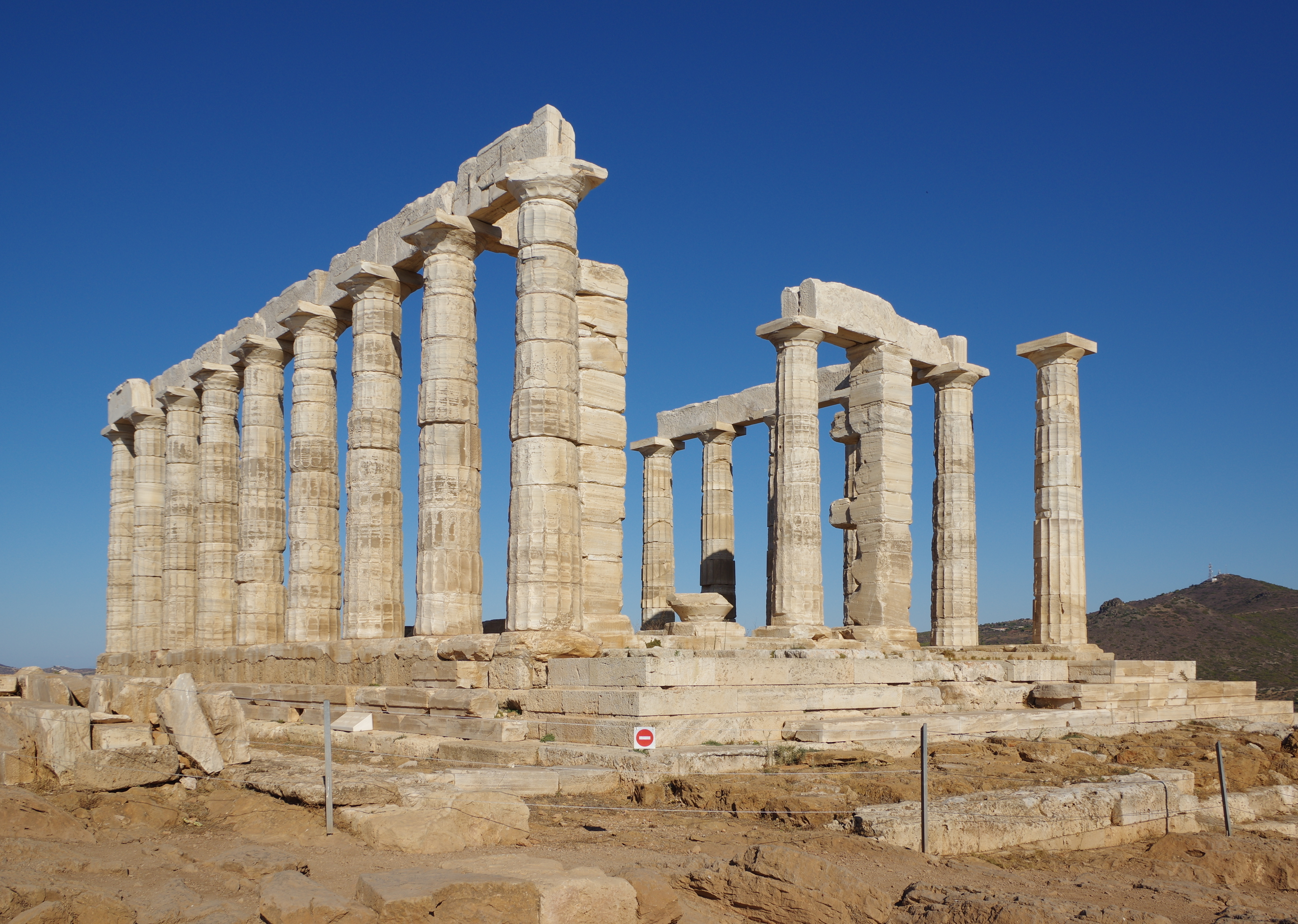
The Temple of Poseidon, Cape Sounion

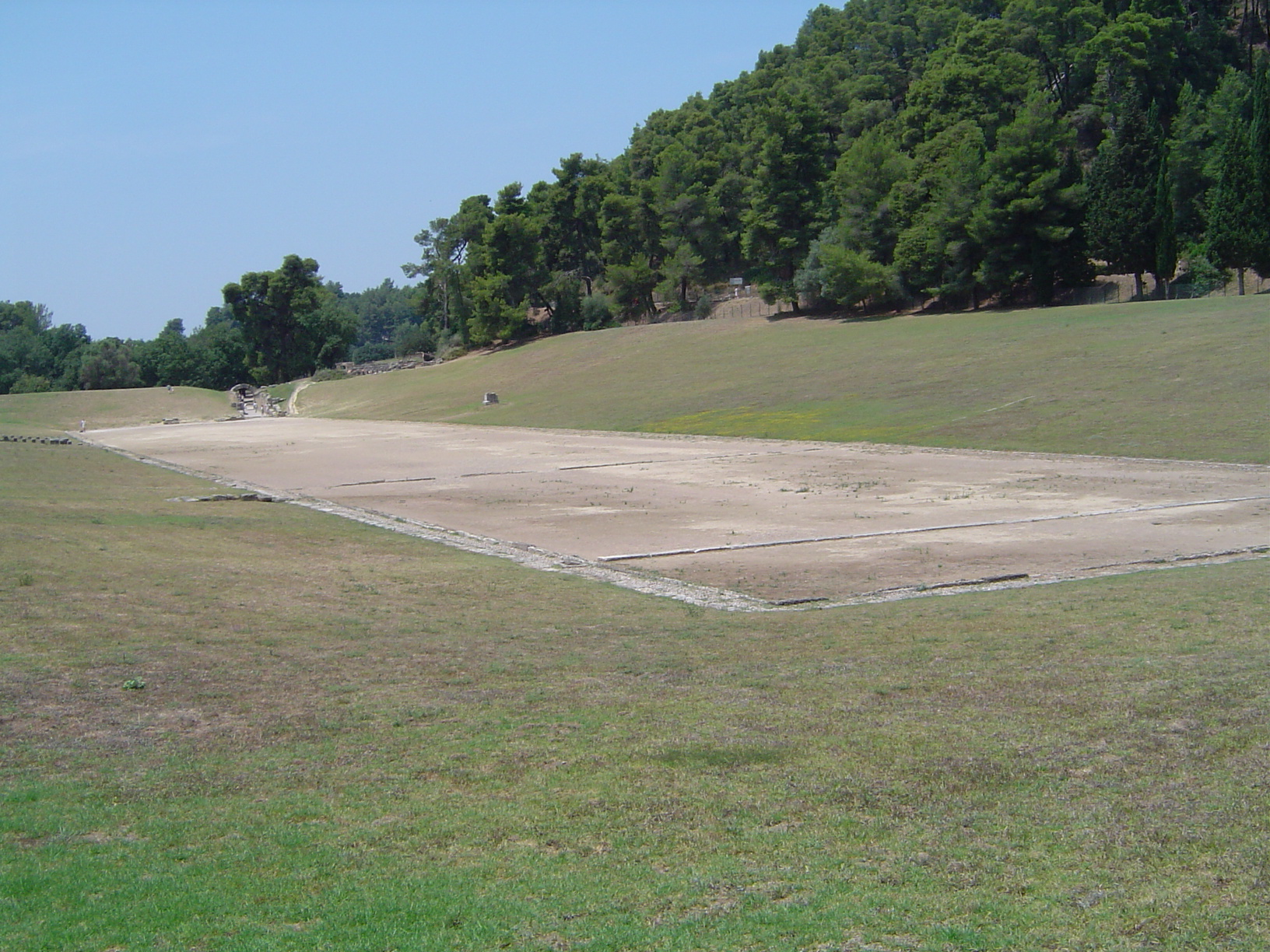
The ancient Olympic Stadium in Olympia

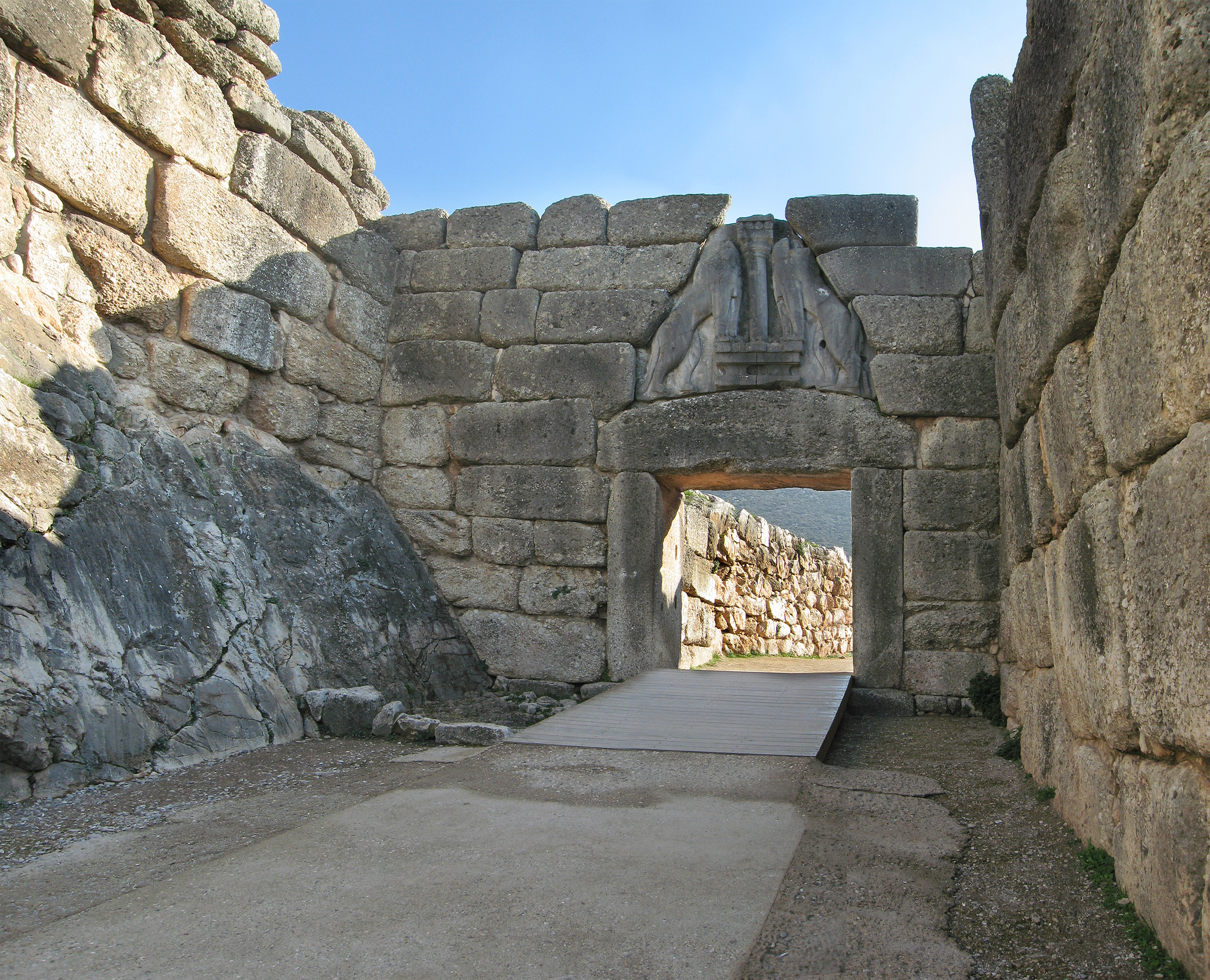
The Lion Gate in Mycenae, Peloponnese

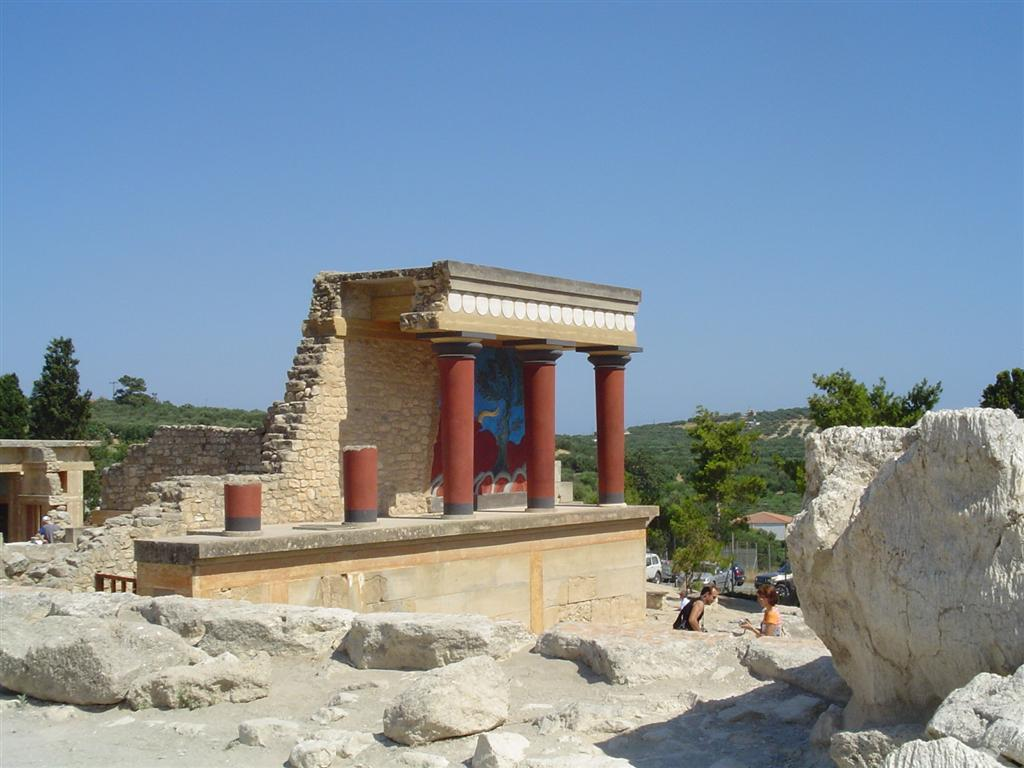
The Minoan palace in Knossos, Crete

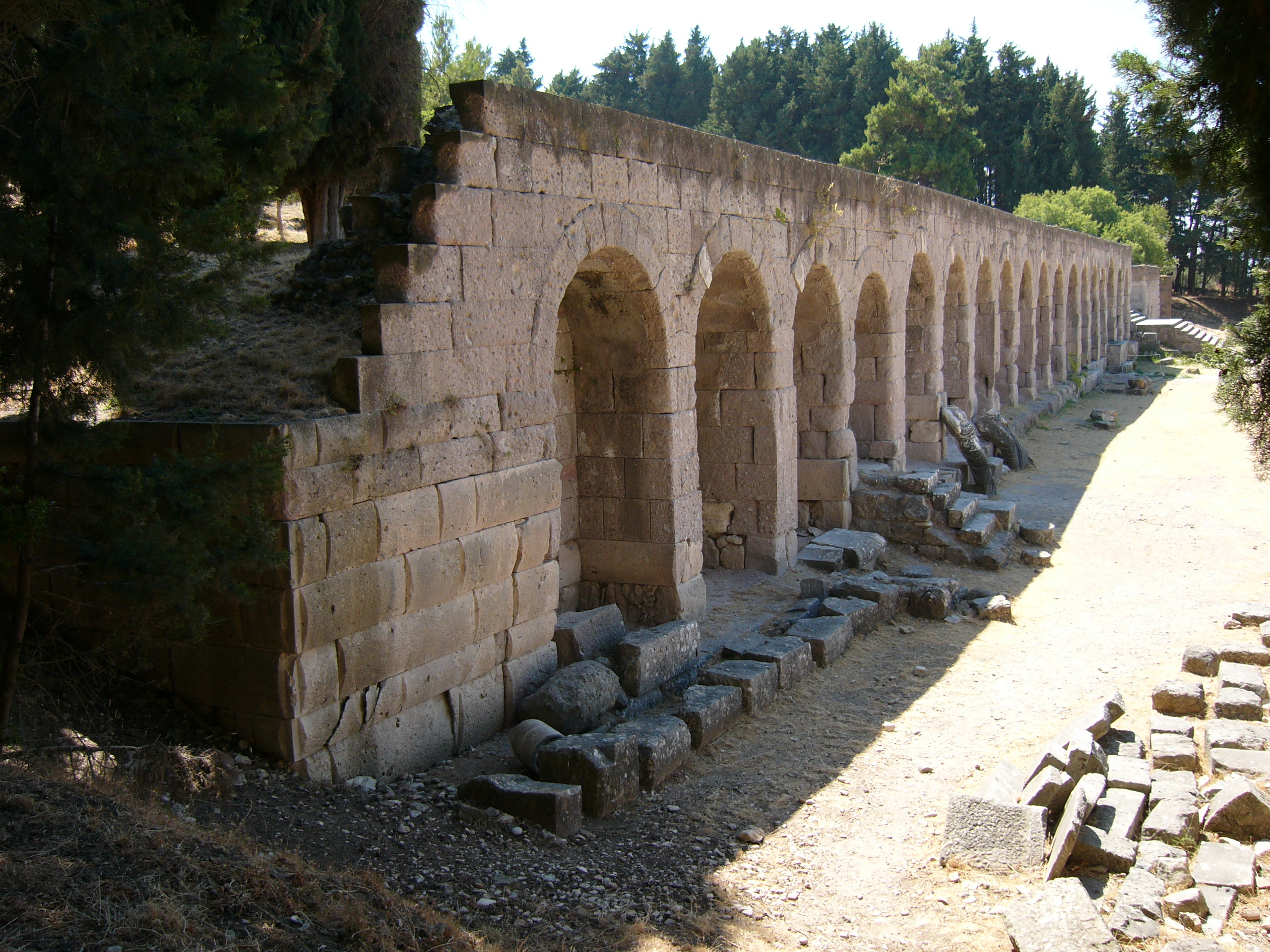
The Asclepeion of Kos

There are numerous archaeological sites dotted all around Greece, many of which are popular with tourists.

The Greek capital, Athens, has many archaeological sites, the most famous being the Acropolis, the Temple of Olympian Zeus, the Ancient Athenian cemetery of Kerameikos, the Philopappou Hill, the Tower of the Winds, Plato's Academy and the Ancient Agora.

In the adjacent area of Attica are the Marathon tumuli, burying mounds in Marathon that house the ashes of the Athenian and Plataean hoplites that were killed in the homonymous battle. Findings from the area and from the battle of Marathon are preserved in the Archaeological Museum of Marathon nearby. In western Attica is Eleusis, where, from as early as 1700 BC up to the 4th century AD, it was the site of the Eleusinian Mysteries, or the Mysteries of Demeter and Kore. At the eastern tip of Attica is Sounion, with the ruins of the Temple of Poseidon.

Central Greece is the location of Thebes, an ancient city that once rivalled Athens, and featured in Greek myth. Delphi has a distinguished ancient theatre, the site of the Oracle. Thermopylae is primarily known for the battle that took place there in 480 BC, in which an outnumbered Greek force probably of seven thousand (including the famous 300 Spartans) held off a substantially larger force of Persians estimated in the range 70,000-300,000 under Xerxes.

The Peloponnese peninsula, dominating the south of the mainland, has a wide variety of archaeological sites. Beginning at the north end, there is Ancient Corinth, near the modern town of the same name. In the northeast of the peninsula are Epidaurus, with its ancient theatre, now restored; Argos, with several ancient ruins, including the Heraion; and Nemea, where, in Greek mythology, Heracles overcame the Nemean Lion of the Lady Hera, and during Antiquity the Nemean Games were played. Most important of all, however, is Mycenae, which, in the second millennium BC, was one of the major centres of Greek civilization, a military stronghold which dominated much of southern Greece and parts of southwest Anatolia. The period of Greek history from about 1600 BC to about 1100 BC is called Mycenaean in reference to Mycenae. Tiryns, also in the area, is a Mycenaean archaeological site.

In the centre of the Peloponnese are Sparta, where, near the modern town, are ancient ruins, the most important being the tomb of Leonidas; Tegea, an important religious center of ancient Greece, containing the Temple of Athena Alea; and Lycosura, said by Pausanias to be the oldest city in the world.

On the western side of the peninsula are Bassae, an archaeological site in the northeastern part of Messenia; Messene itself, the ruins of a large classical city-state refounded by Epaminondas in 369 BC; and, at Pylos, the ruins of the Palace of Nestor, which is the primary structure within a larger Late Helladic era settlement, likely once surrounded by a fortified wall. In the northwest is Olympia, with many ancient ruins, including the Temple of Zeus, the Temple of Hera, the Palaestra and the Leonidaion.

Archaeological sites in Epirus, the western part of mainland Greece, include Ambracia, the ruins of the ancient capital of Pyrrhus of Epirus; Dodona, whose shrine was regarded as the oldest Hellenic oracle, possibly dating to the second millennium BC according to Herodotus; Elaea, near the mouth of the Acheron; and Gitanae. Nicopolis or Actia Nicopolis, also in Epirus, was founded 31 BC by Octavian in memory of his victory over Antony and Cleopatra at Actium the previous year. In addition, there are the ruins believed by some to be those of the Necromanteion of Acheron, an ancient Greek temple of necromancy devoted to Hades and Persephone.

Thessaly, another region of central Greece, has an archaeological site in Larissa, the Frourio Hill, which is the location of an ancient theatre and the ruins of a basilica.

The second city of Greece, Thessaloniki, is nicknamed the "Co-capital". It has many historic buildings, some World Heritage Sites, including the Arch and Rotunda of Galerius, the Church of Panagia Chalkeon and the White Tower.

In the adjacent region of Macedonia, there is Dion, the sacred place of the Ancient Macedonians. Dion is the site of a large temple dedicated to Zeus, as well as a series of temples to Demeter and to Isis. Pella, also in the region, is the capital of Ancient Macedonia and birthplace of Alexander the Great and Philip II of Macedon.

Other archaeological sites in Macedonia include Olynthus in Chalcidice; Philippi, established by the king of Macedon, Philip II, on the site of the Thracian colony of Krinides or Crenides; Amphipolis, an ancient city once inhabited by the Edoni people; Leibethra, an ancient city close to Olympus where Orpheus was buried by the Muses; Stagira, ruins of the ancient city known as the birthplace of Aristotle; and Vergina, a World Heritage Site, the location of the Macedonian Royal Tombs and the ruins of the ancient Macedonian capital.

Thrace, of which only the western part belongs to modern Greece, has an archaeological site at Abdera. Didymoteicho is a historical town built near the Turkish border which has many Ancient Greek, Byzantine and Ottoman landmarks, including the ruins of the ancient city of Plotinopolis, the Byzantine fortifications built around the town, the Bayezid Mosque built in 1420 and the Silent Baths, the oldest hamam in Europe.

The Greek islands have numerous historical sites of their own. Chalcis is located on Euboea. Delos is an uninhabited island in the Cyclades famous for its numerous archaeological sites, including the Stoivadeion, the Temple of the Delians, the Terrace of the Lions and the House of the Dolphins. On Syros, near Piraeus, and linked to the latter by a ferry taking only 2.5 hours, is the neoclassical city of Hermoupolis, where two civilizations and two religions lived harmonically and peacefully together. It has beaches, classical theatre, casino, general hospital and many places to see.

Santorini, one of the Cyclades, is the location of Ancient Thera, an antique city on a ridge of the steep, 360 m high Messavouno mountain, and of Akrotiri, a Minoan Bronze Age settlement.

The Samothrace temple complex is one of the principal Pan-Hellenic religious sanctuaries, located on the island of Samothrace.

Crete, the largest Greek island, has archaeological sites at Phaistos in the south, Zakros in the east, and most important of all, Knossos in the centre, which is famous for its ruined Minoan palace, with bull motifs.

Rhodes, one of the Dodecanese islands, is the location of the Acropolis of Rhodes, an acropolis dating from the Classical Greek period (5th–3rd century BC); the Acropolis of Lindos, a natural citadel which was fortified successively by the Greeks, the Romans, the Byzantines, the Knights of St John and the Ottomans; and the ancient city of Kameiros. On the nearby island of Kos is the Asclepeion, the ruins of one of the greatest healing temples of the Ancient World and the place where Hippocrates, the father of modern medicine was trained. On Kastellorizo, the easternmost island of Greece, is the Lycian Tomb, a rock cut tomb built by the ancient Anatolian civilization of the Lycians.

== Alternate tourism ==
=== Four Seasons & Winter tourism ===
The government intends to promote four seasons & winter tourism in Greece, which could potentially increase international arrivals even further.

=== Culinary tourism ===
Culinary tourism, encompassing both traditional and contemporary Greek cuisine, has expended significantly, with several food companies and gastronomy restaurants receiving distinctions.

=== Ecotourism ===
Greece has become in recent years a destination for ecotourism (especially hiking, canoeing, caving and climbing). The main destinations for skiing in Greece are Arachova, Kalavryta, Karpenisi and Metsovo. The Greek government is trying to bring more and more ecotourism to help benefit the environment.

=== Camping tourism ===
Camping and glamping tourism in Greece developed several years ago, mostly through seaside campsites offering various facilities and amenities. For RV vehicles, RV parking sites, campervan and camping sites, caravan, vehicle camping, tent camping, campfire, backpacking (hiking), canoe camping, wild camping and other related types are being operated and governed by Greek laws and applicable legislation. The Greek Road Traffic Code (KOK) governs and clarifies when a vehicle type of camper, motorhome or caravan is legally parked and when it may be considered illegal camping in Greece.

=== Conference tourism ===
Conference tourism, targeted at academic, business, or cultural markets, is a cornerstone of the Greek national tourism policy. As a result, the Greek government, with strong support from local authorities, has been offering lucrative cash grants, leasing and employment subsidies and tax allowances to establish new conference facilities and expand existing ones. In a recent report in Meeting and Incentive Travel, Greece was ranked eighth in the world in overnight stays for conferences. Figures from the Tourism Satellite Accounting Research, conducted by WTTC (World Travel & Tourism Council) project a worldwide increase in revenues in business travel to Greece from US$1.51 bn. in 2001 to US$2.69 bn. in 2011. In 1998, the figure stood at US$1.18 bn.

=== Medical tourism ===
Greece's temperate climate, medical staff, and medical innovations also are contributing to the country's medical travel industry.

=== Digital Nomads ===
Greece has entered the map of digital nomad destinations in recent years, made the country attractive for remote workers seeking flexibility and travel facilities.

=== LGBT tourism ===
Greece also is one of Europe's most popular LGBT tourist destinations, particularly its largest cities Athens and Thessaloniki and some of its islands such as Lesbos, Santorini, Skiathos and Mykonos. The latter is a well-known Gay-friendly destination with many establishments catering for the LGBT community. Skiathos and Mykonos are ranked among the most LGBT-friendly destinations in Europe and the world.

=== Religious tourism ===
Greece is promoting religious tourism and pilgrimages to regions with a significant historical religious presence, such as the Christian monasteries in Meteora and Mount Athos, in cooperation with other countries.

== Economic impact ==
At the same time, tourism consumption increased considerably since the turn of the millennium, from US$17.7 bn. in 2000 to US$29.6 bn. in 2004. The numbers of jobs directly or indirectly related to the tourism sector were 659,719 and represented 16.5% of the country's total employment for that year.

=== Revenues by countries ===
Greece earned €19,746,000,000 (around 11% of the total GDP) through its tourism industry, in 2023.

The top four countries by revenue (in ‘000 euros) were:

Rank	Country	Number
1	Germany	€3,571,000
2	United Kingdom	€3,294,000
3	France	€1,425,000
4	USA	€1,374,000
5	Italy	€1,078,000

== Visitors ==
Yearly tourist arrivals in millions

In 2009, the country welcomed over 19.3 million tourists, a major increase from the 17.7 million tourists the country welcomed in 2008. Also, it is predicted that tourism market is expected to reach USD 1431.88 billion by the end of 2037. The vast majority of tourists in the country are from within the European Union (12.7 million), followed by those from the Americas (0.56 million), Asia (0.52 million), Oceania (0.1 million) and Africa (0.06 million). In the year 2007, more British people visited the country than any other nationality, numbering 2.61 million in total, making up 15% of the country's tourists for that year alone. Additionally, 2.3 million Germans, 1.8 million Albanians and 1.1 million Bulgarians visited the country that year. In 2007, 92.8% of the total number of tourists in Greece were from countries in Europe.

Forest road in Mount Pelion

The most-visited region of Greece is that of Central Macedonia in northern Greece, near some of the most popular attractions in the country such as Halkidiki, Mount Olympus, Pella, the birthplace of Alexander the Great, and Greece's second-largest city, Thessaloniki. In 2009, Central Macedonia welcomed 3.6 million tourists, or 18% of the total number of tourists who visited Greece that year, followed by Attica (2.6 million) and the Peloponnese (1.8 million). Northern Greece is the country's most-visited region, with 6.5 million tourists, while Central Greece comes second with 6.3 million.

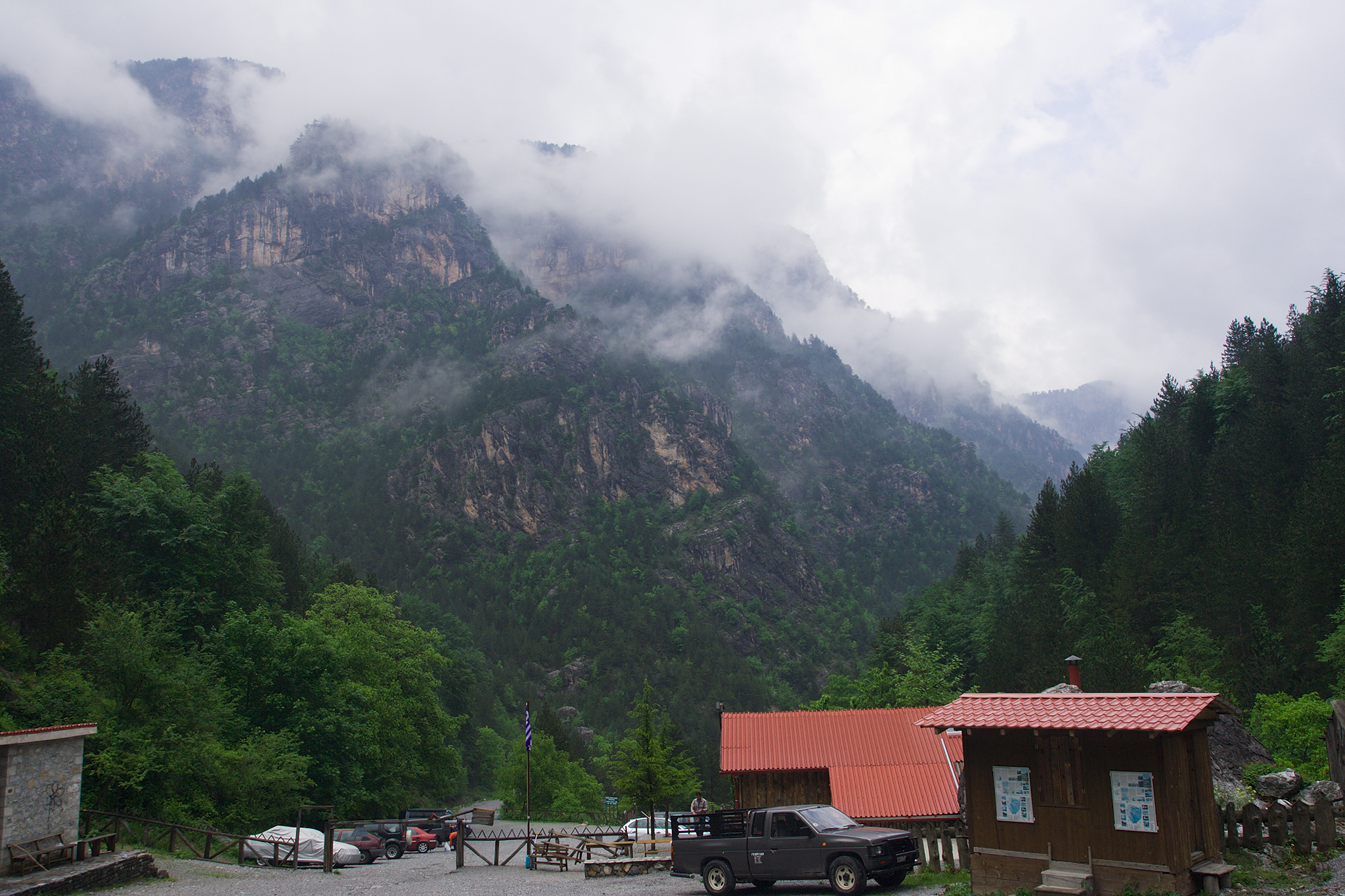
Mountain lodge in Mount Olympus

According to a survey conducted in China in 2015, Greece was voted as the Chinese people's number one choice as a tourist destination. In 2024, Austria announced that Greece was the favourite tourist destination for its citizens. In line with these observations, Greece's former Minister of Tourism Aris Spiliotopoulos announced the opening of a Greek National Tourism Organization office in Shanghai by the end of 2010, and GNTO currently operates two tourism offices in China, one in Shanghai and one in Beijing. It is estimated that throughout 2013 Greece welcomed over 17.93 million tourists, an increase of 10% compared to 2012.

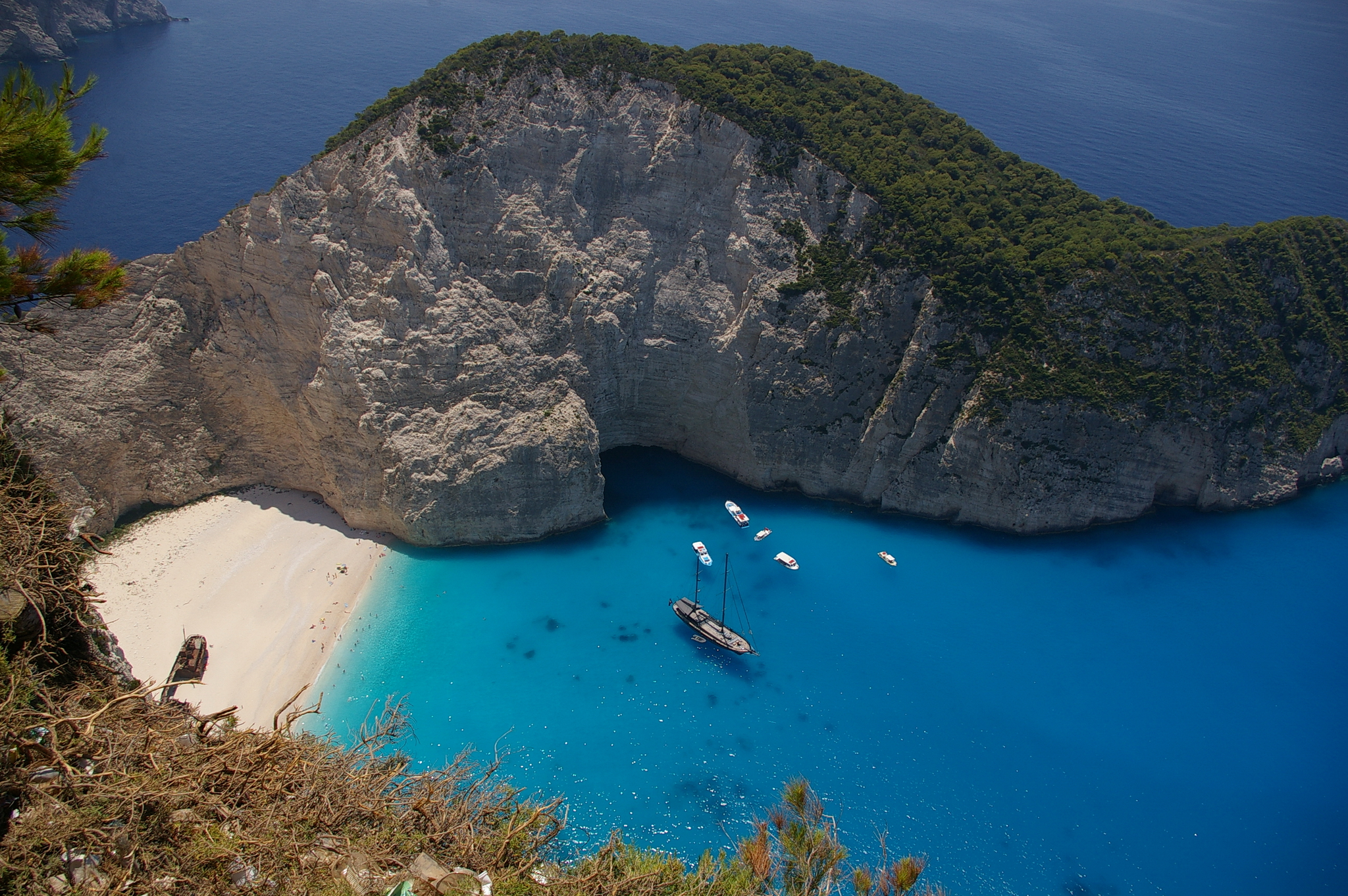
Navagio, a sand beach in Zakynthos

More than 22 million tourists visited Greece in 2014 and this number increased to 26 million visitors in 2015 and is projected to attract 28 million visitors in 2016, making it one of the most visited countries in Europe and the world. Tourism in Greece will typically peak between May and September where approximately 75% of all tourist visits happen.

=== Arrivals by countries ===
In 2023, Germany ranked as the leading tourist market for Greece with approximately 4.7 million tourists visiting the country. United Kingdom and France followed on the ranking with roughly 4.5 million and 4.2 million travelers in Greece, respectively. Traditionally, Germany, UK, France, Bulgaria, Italy and USA have been the main tourist markets for Greece. In 2023, the top 10 countries of arrival were:

Rank	Country	Number
1	Germany	4,764,235
2	United Kingdom	4,591,656
3	France	4,230,982
4	Bulgaria	2,874,507
5	Italy	1,842,293
6	Romania	1,415,892
7	United States	1,406,522
8	Poland	1,185,784
9	North Macedonia	1,127,936
10	The Netherlands	1,126,617
Total Arrivals		32,735,155

== Promoting Greek tourism ==
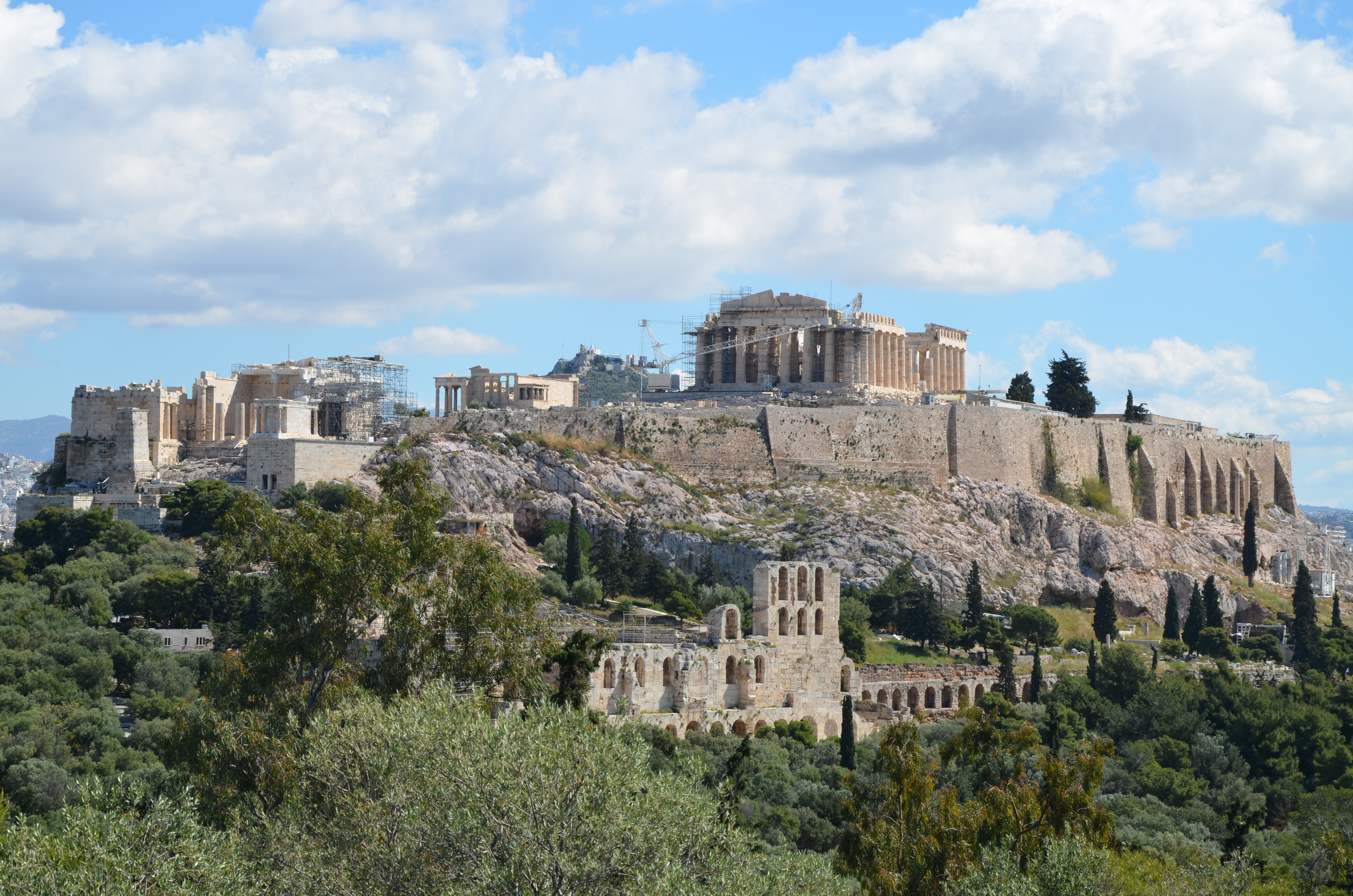
View of the Acropolis of Athens from the Philopappos Hill

Tourism in Greece is run by the Greek National Tourism Organisation (GNTO) who used Helena Paparizou, a famous Greek singer who won Eurovision Song Contest in 2005 as an ambassador. Singer Sakis Rouvas, who represented Greece in the 2009 Eurovision song contest, is currently the ambassador for Greek Tourism.

The advertisements displayed in the GNTO's web"site still focus on the triptych of sea, sun and sand. However, the tourism campaign is undergoing a significant change as city-breaks and conference tourism are promoted, along with cultural and wellness tourism. The impact of the new campaign will hopefully result in increased tourist revenues. The name of commercials is "You in Greece".

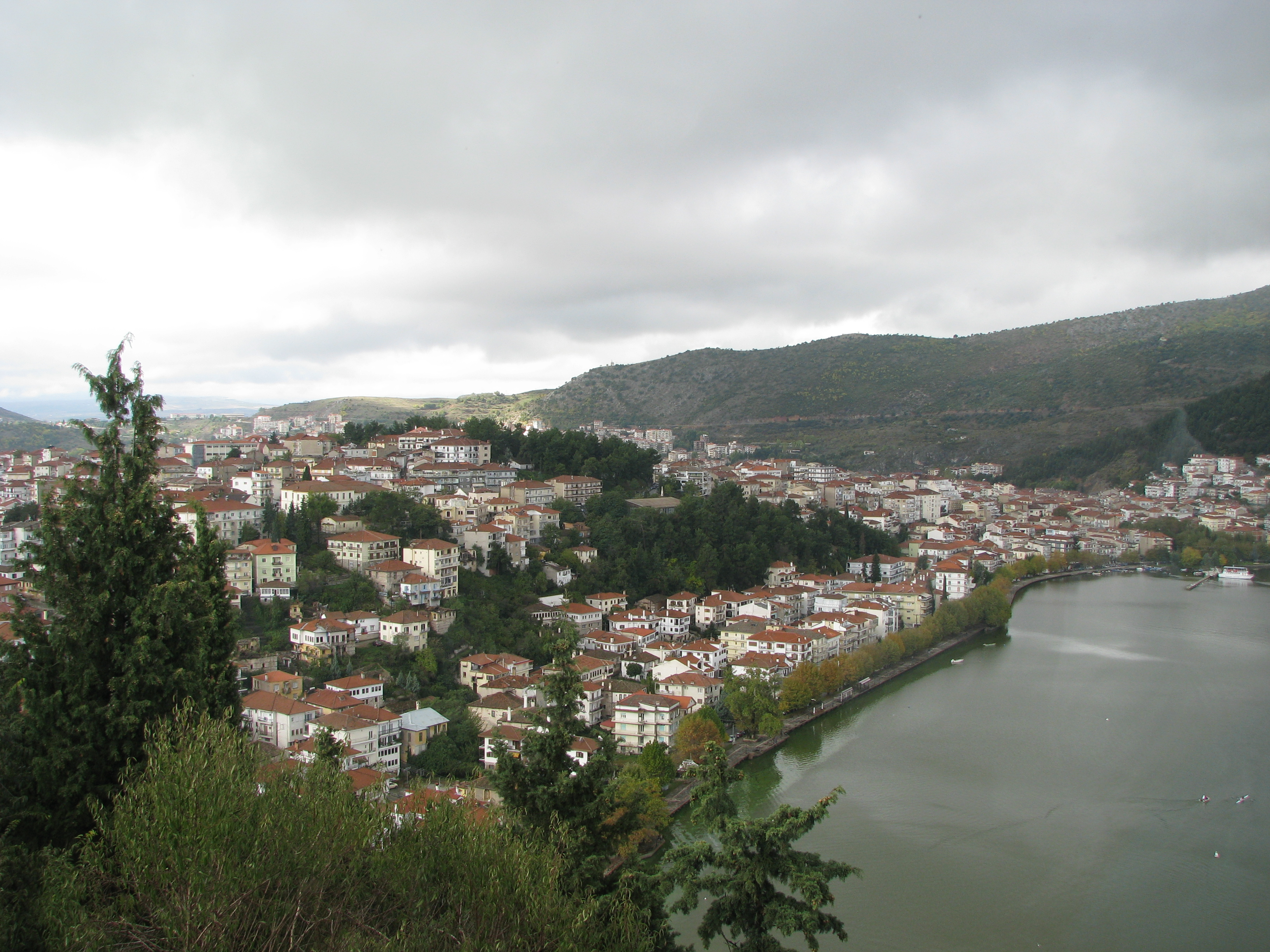
The city of Kastoria, on the shores of the Lake of Kastoria

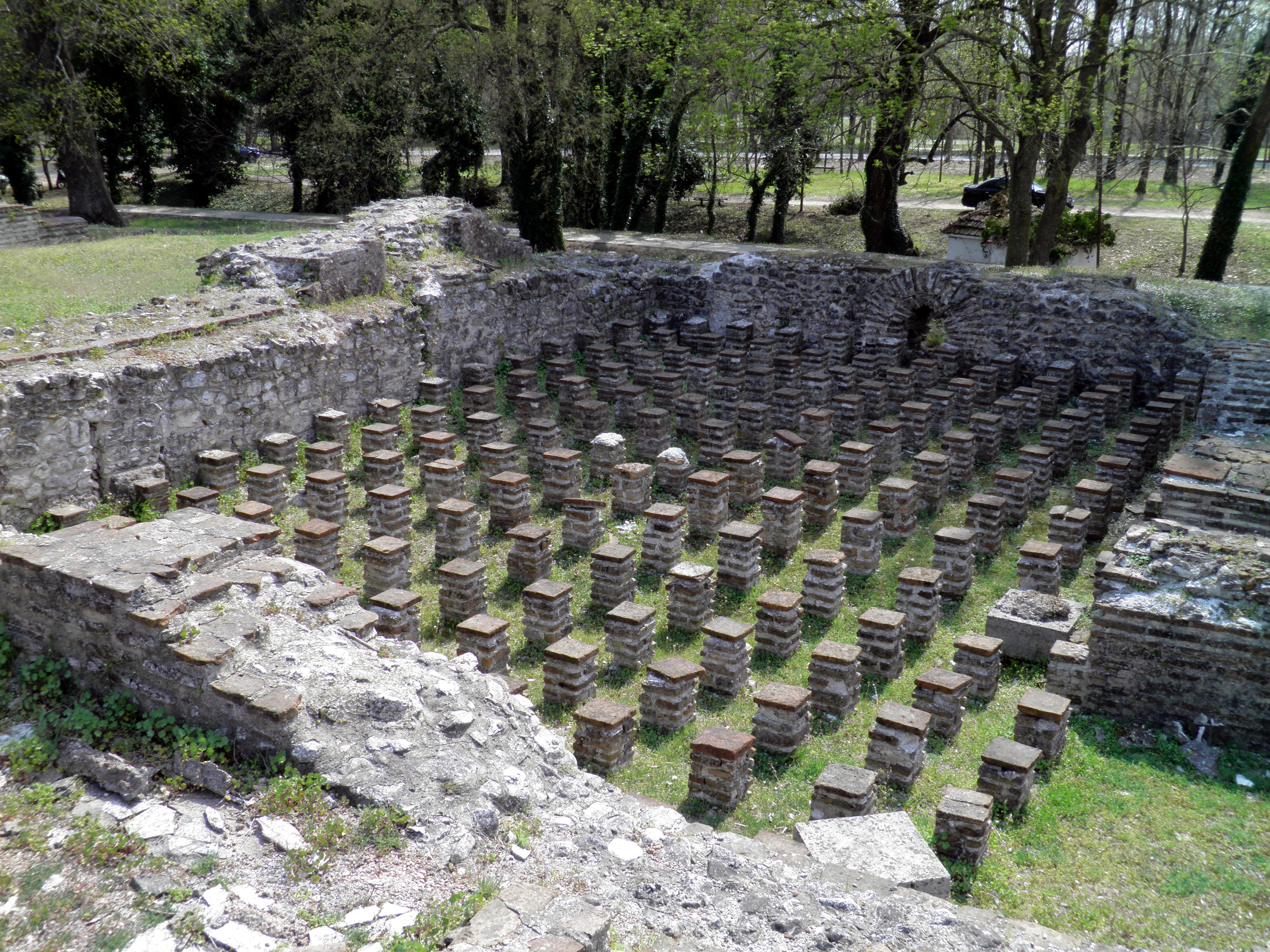
Ancient Dion, Pieria

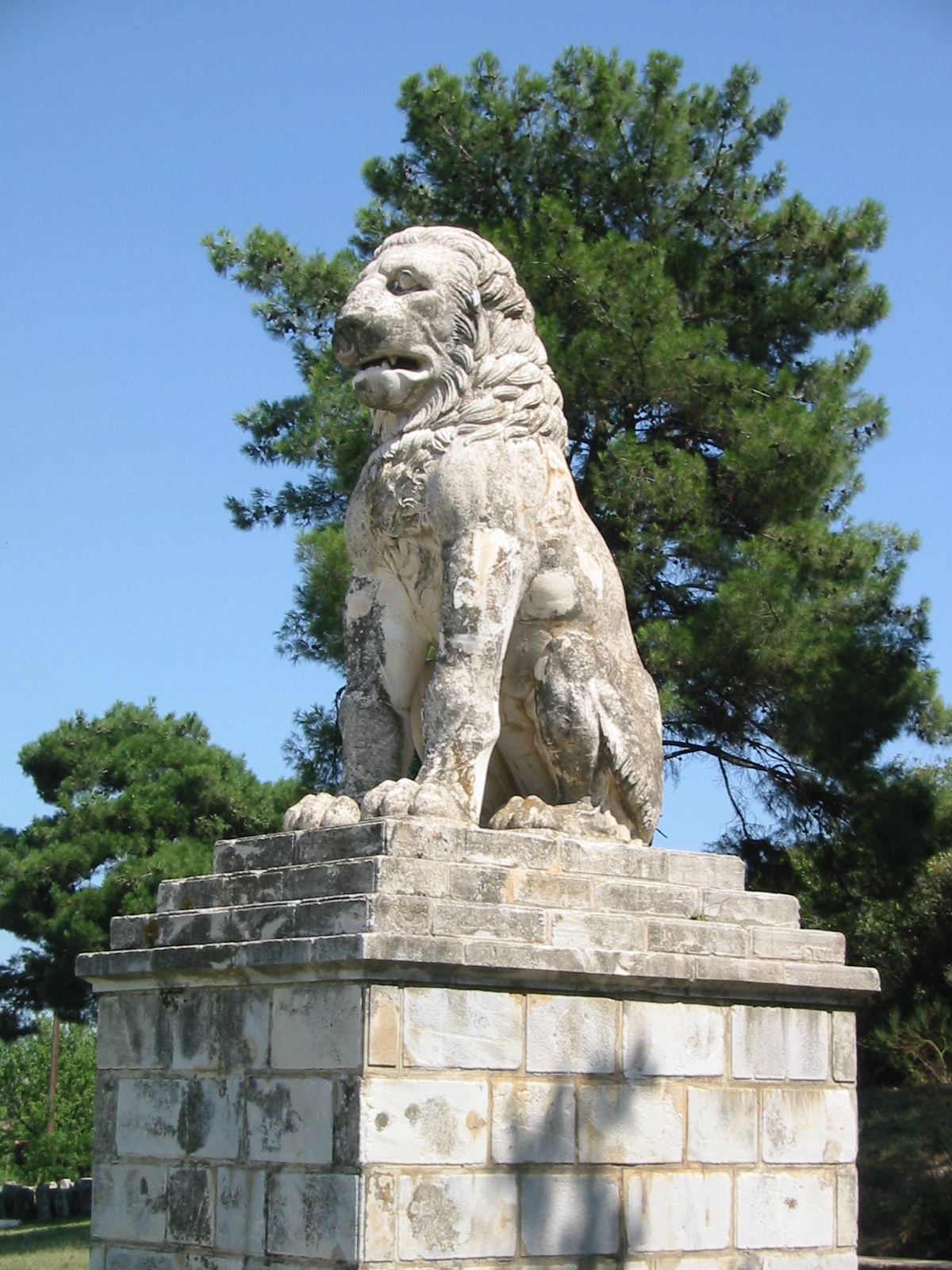
The Lion of Amphipolis, near the Kasta Tomb

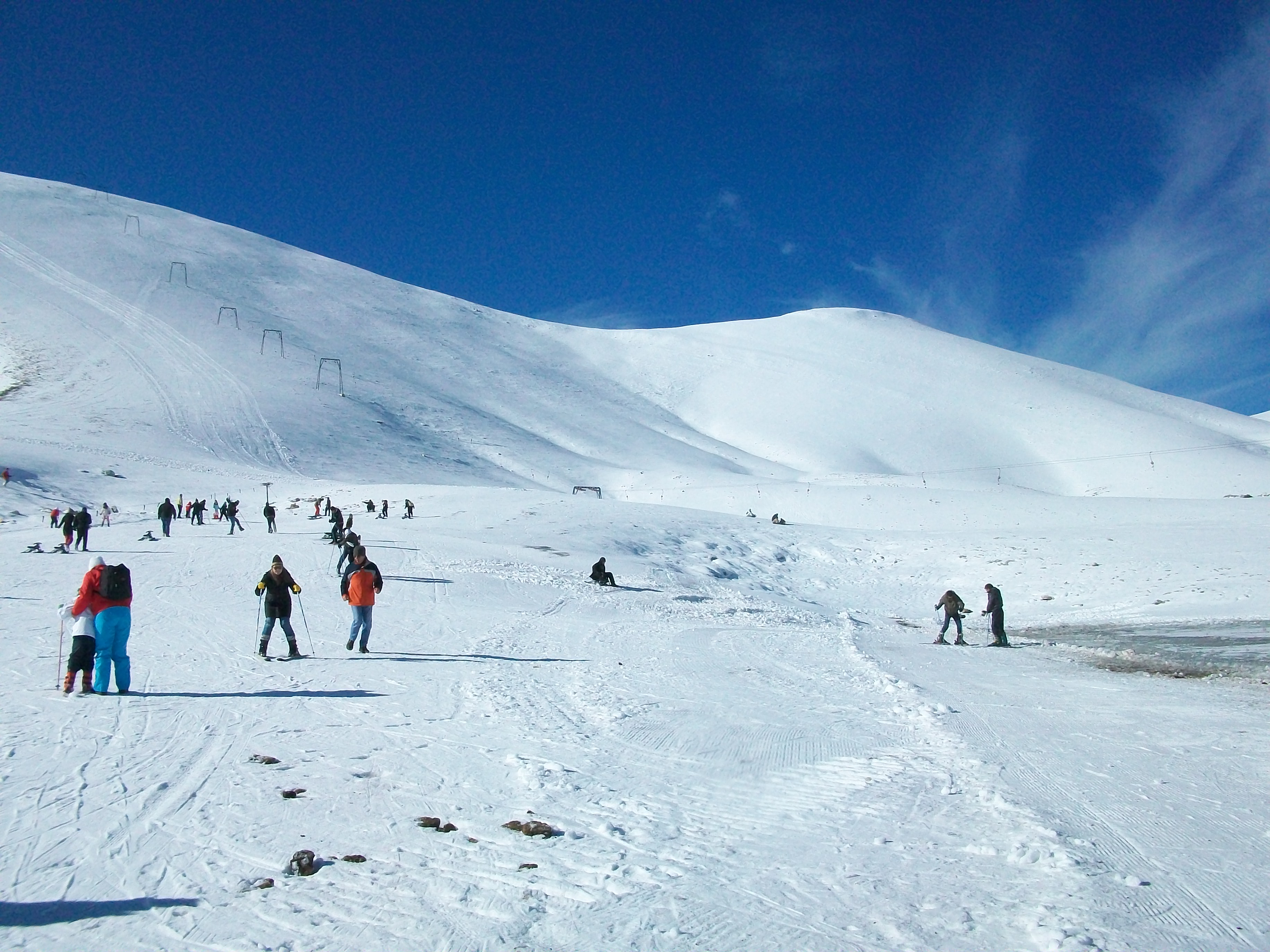
Ski resort in Falakro

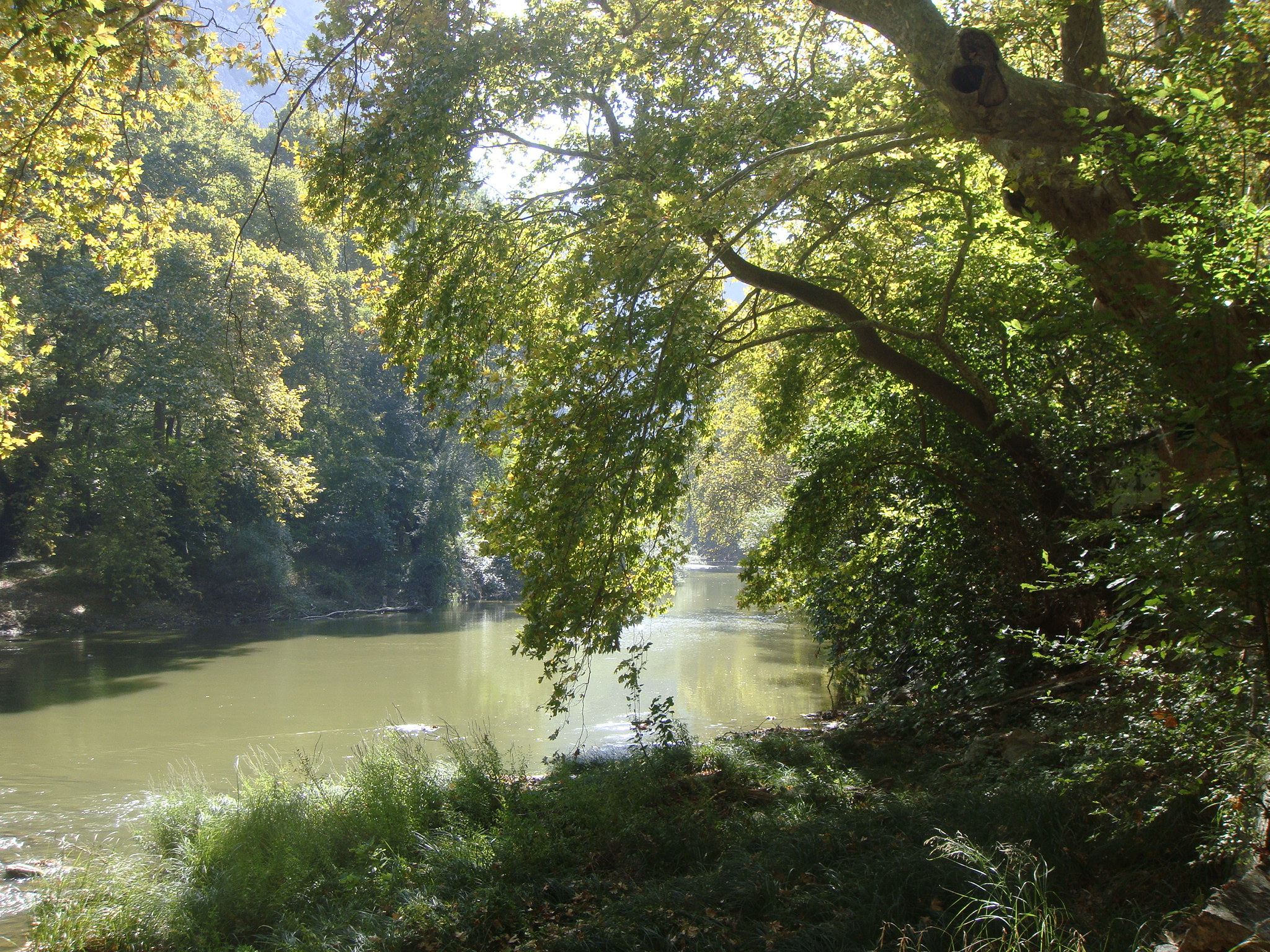
Tempe valley

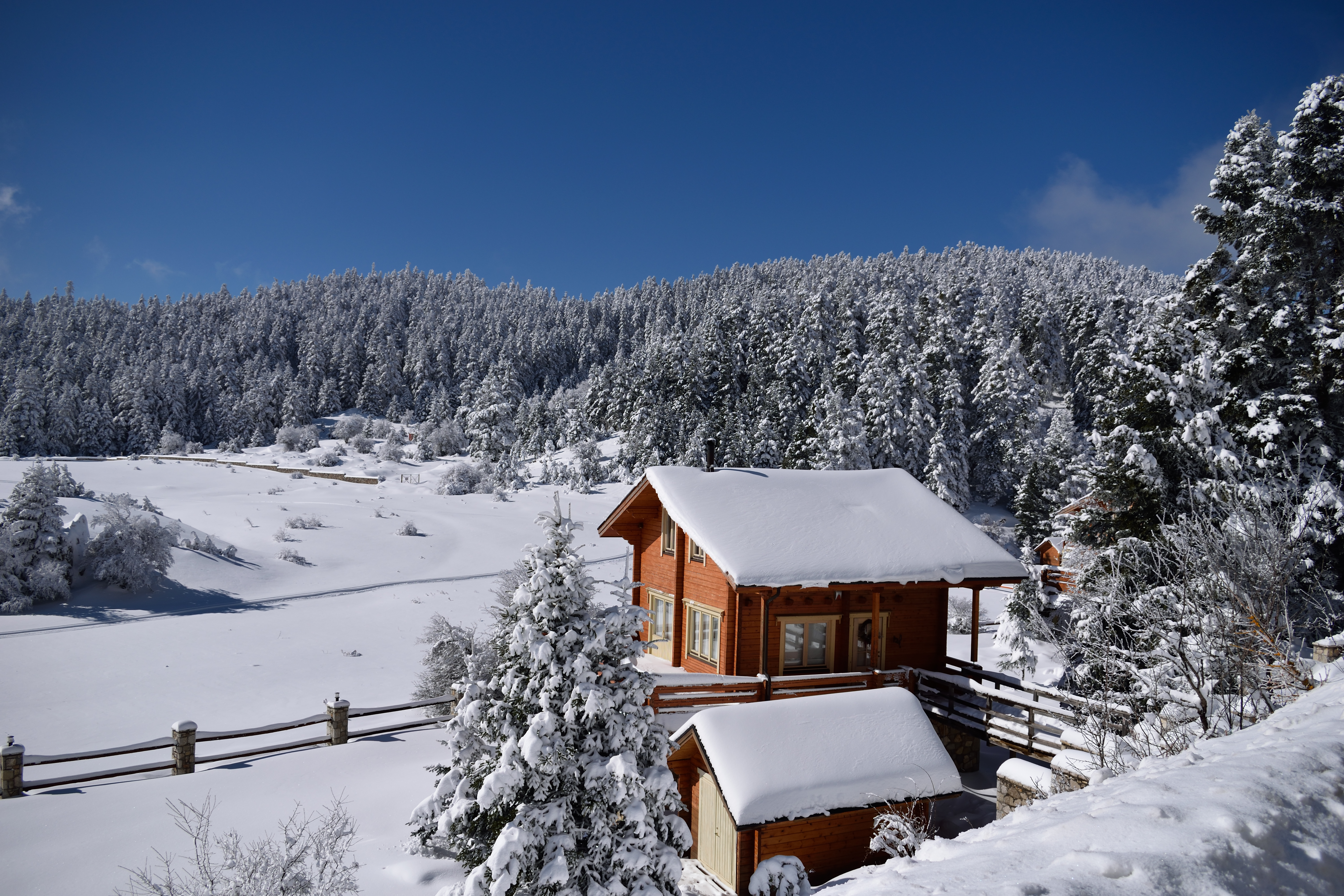
Parnassus ski resort

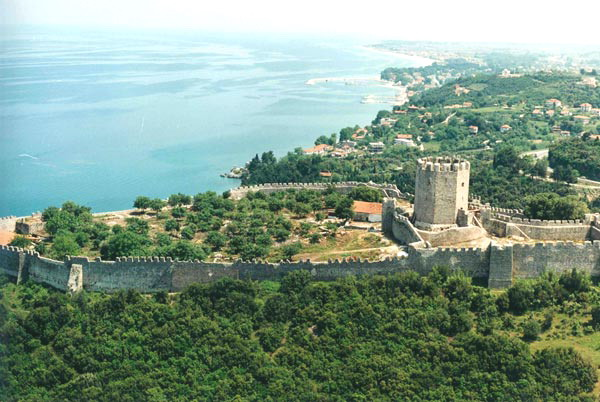
Platamon Castle

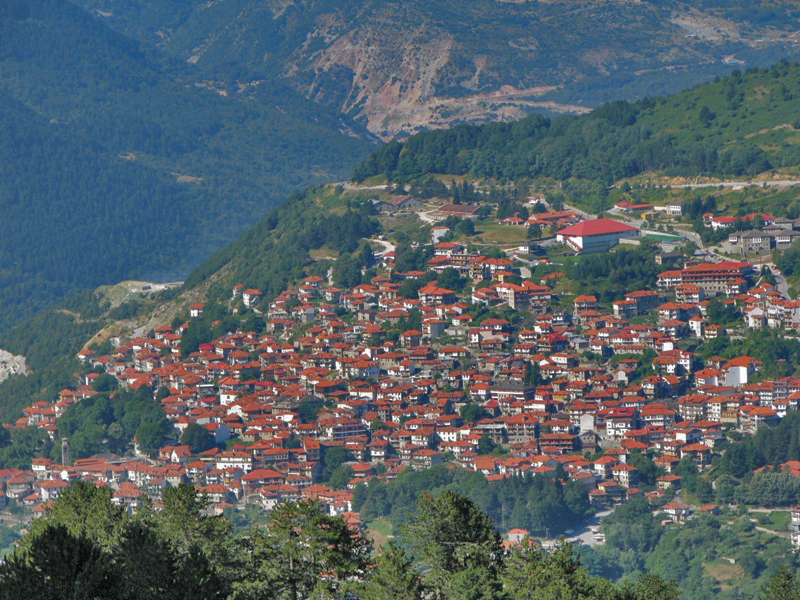
The Epirote town of Metsovo

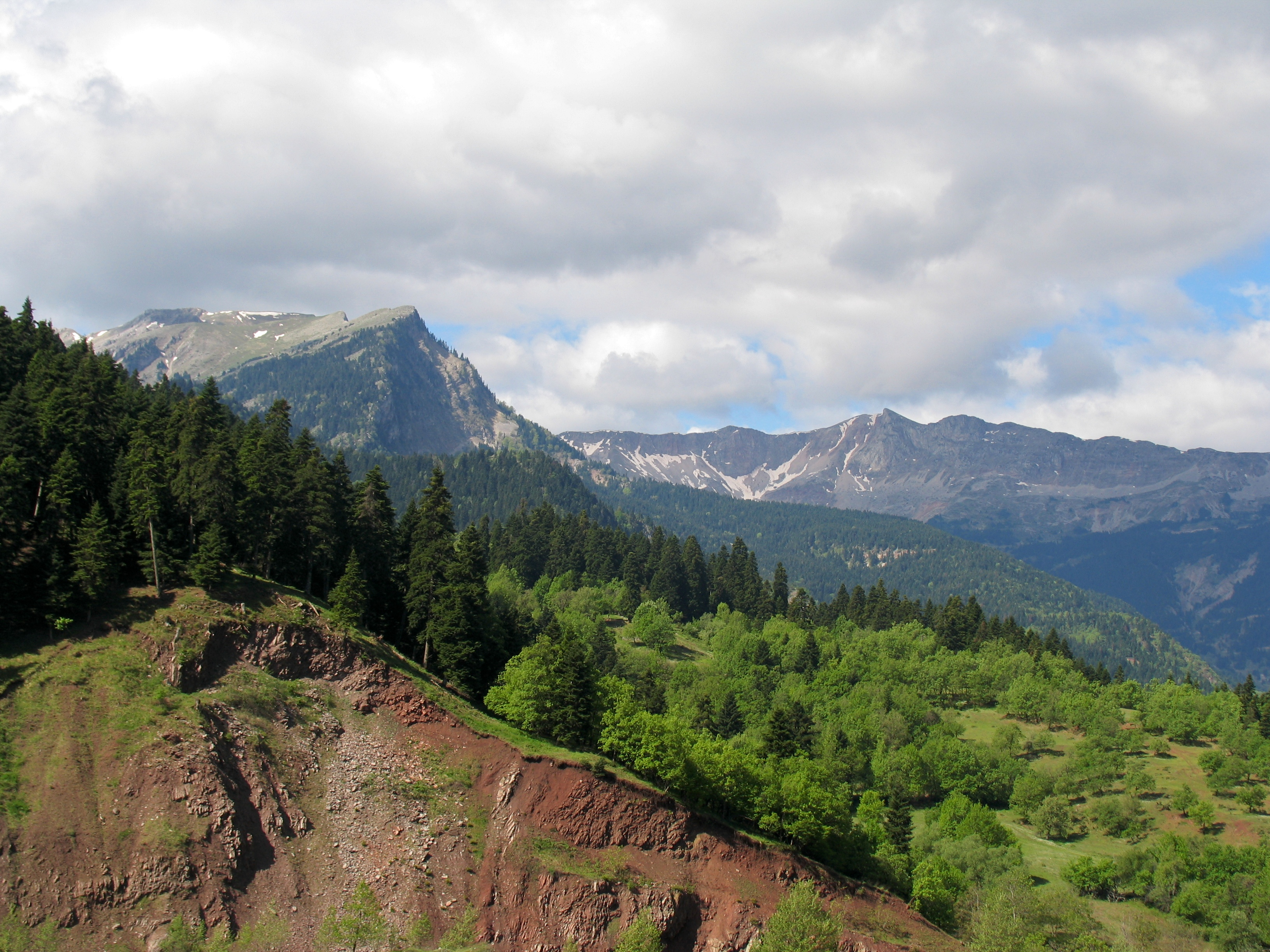
Pindus National Park in Mainland Greece

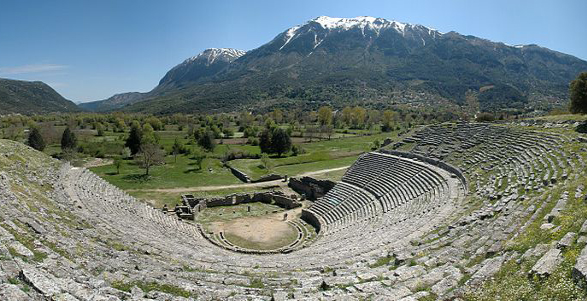
The ancient theatre at Dodona, Epirus

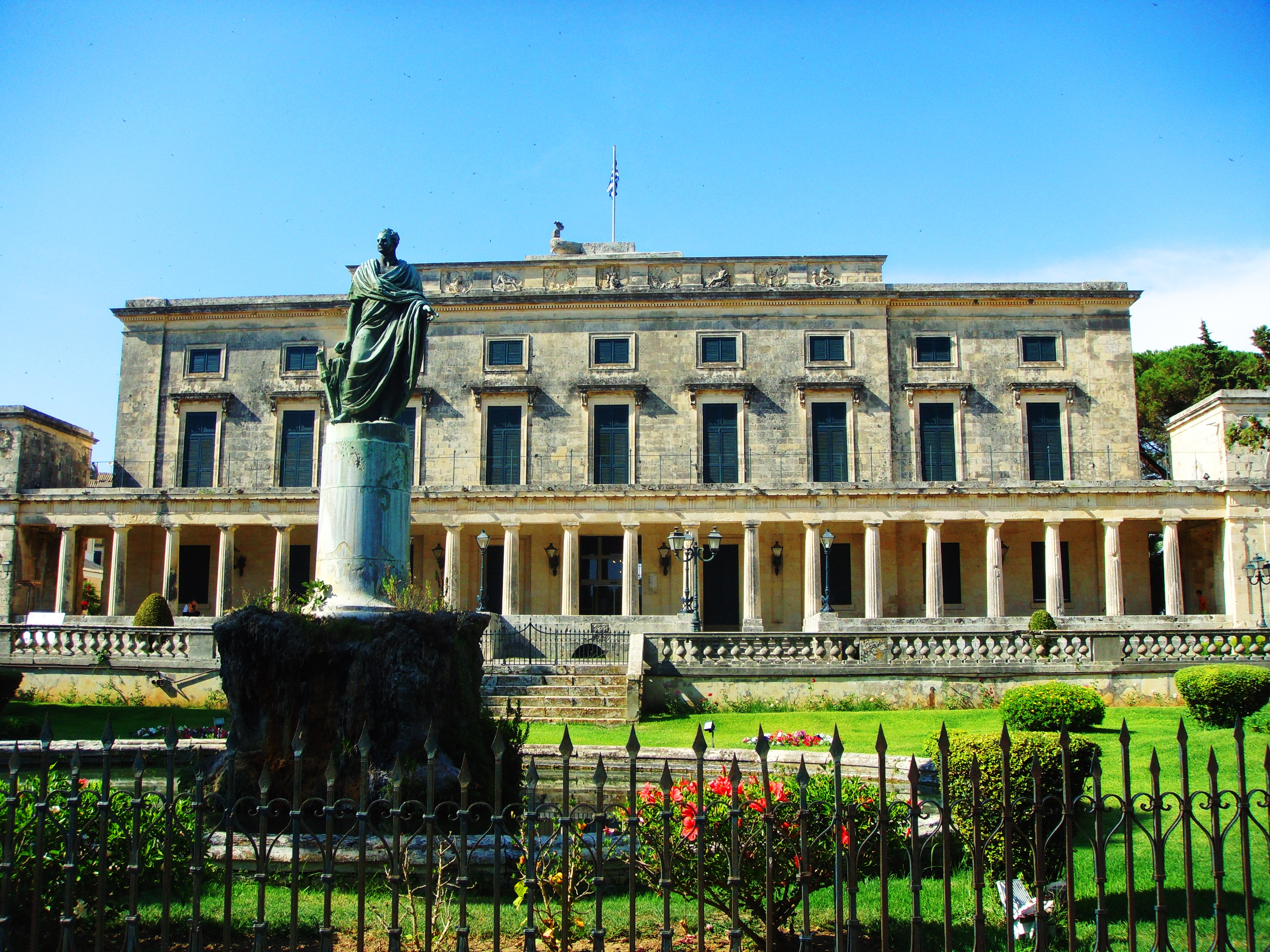
Palace of St. Michael and St. George, Corfu (city)

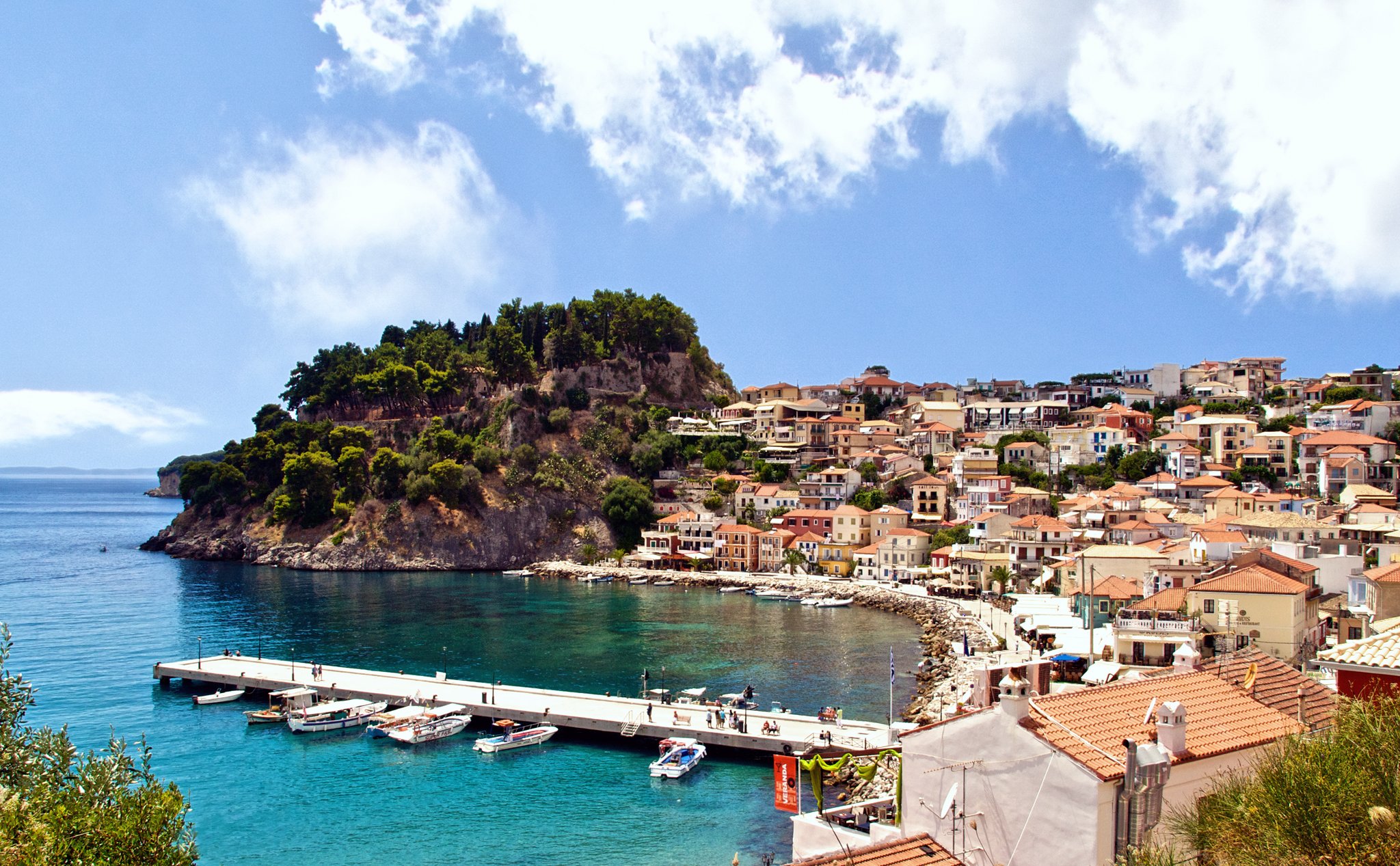
Overview of Parga, on the Ionian coast

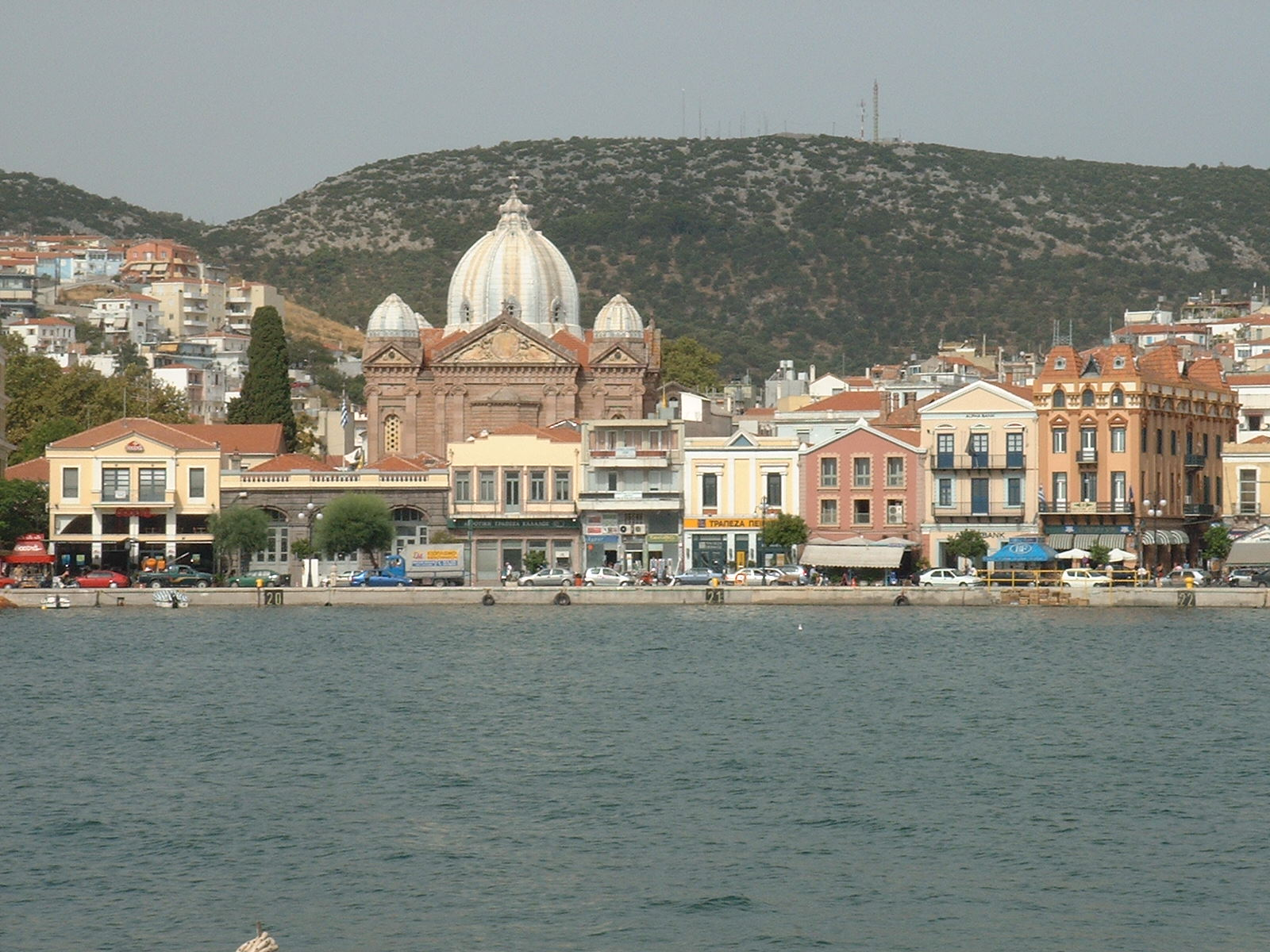
The town of Mytilene, in Lesbos island

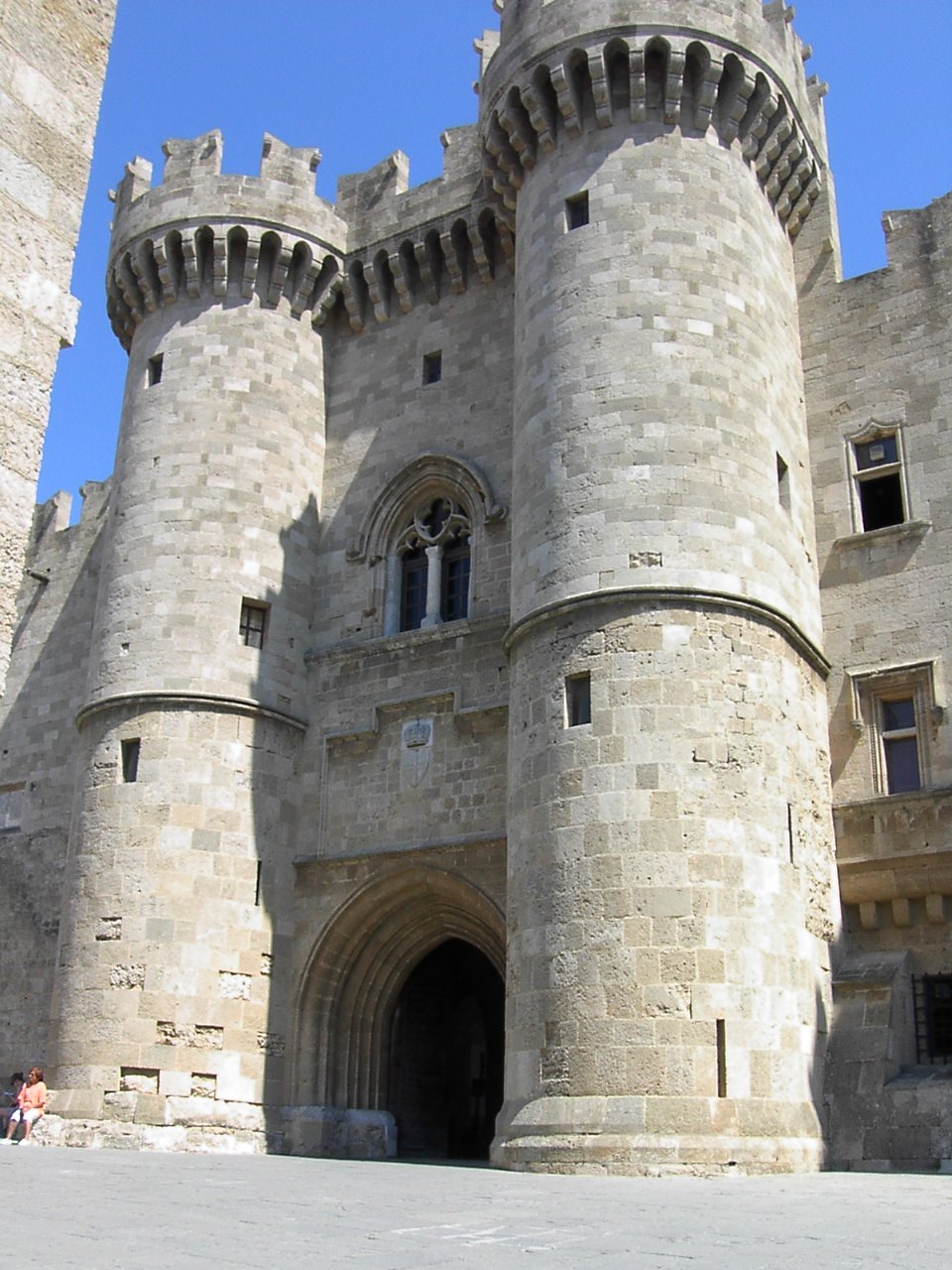
Palace of the Grand Master of the Knights, in Rhodes island–

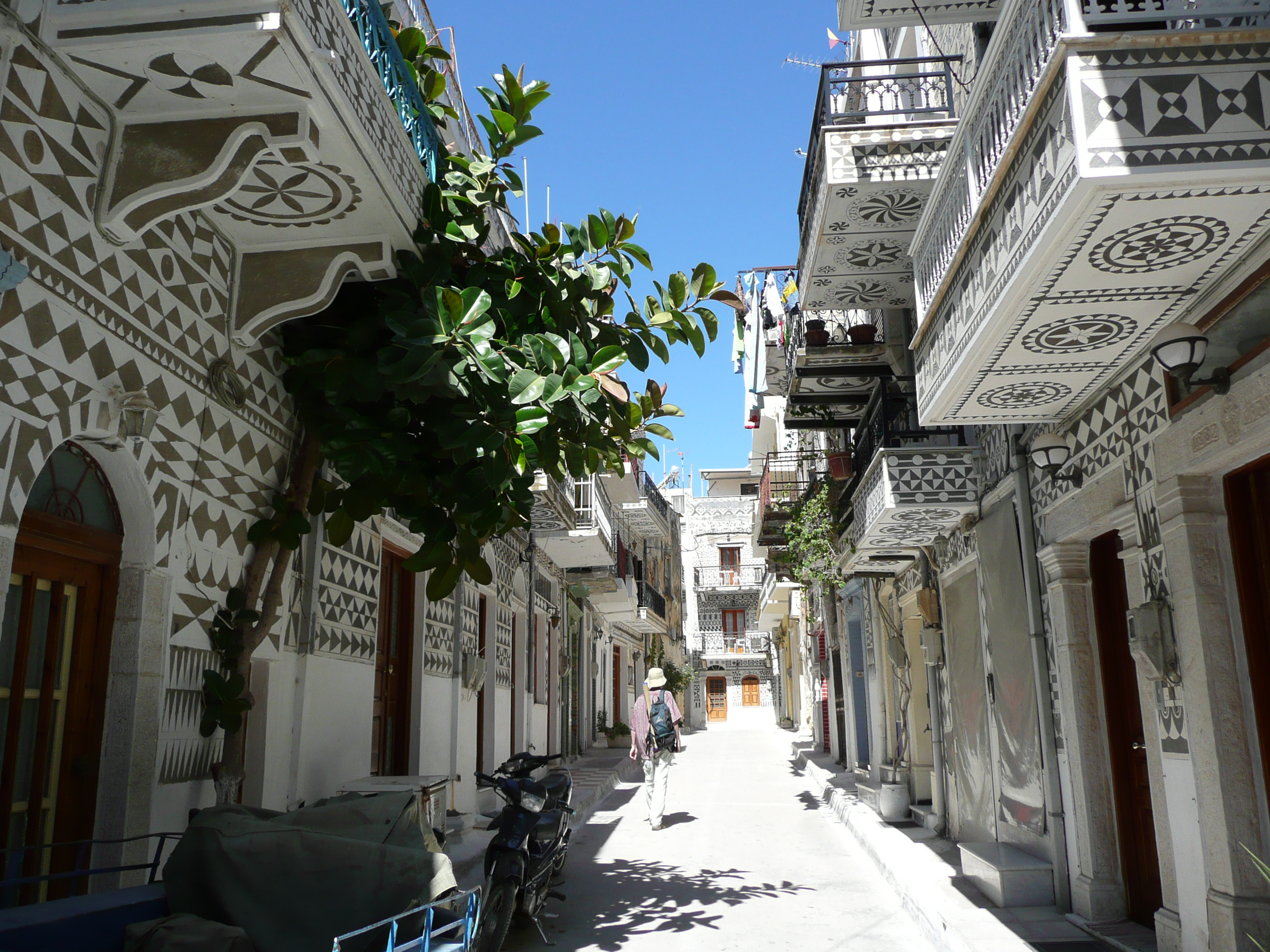
Mastichochoria, in Chios island

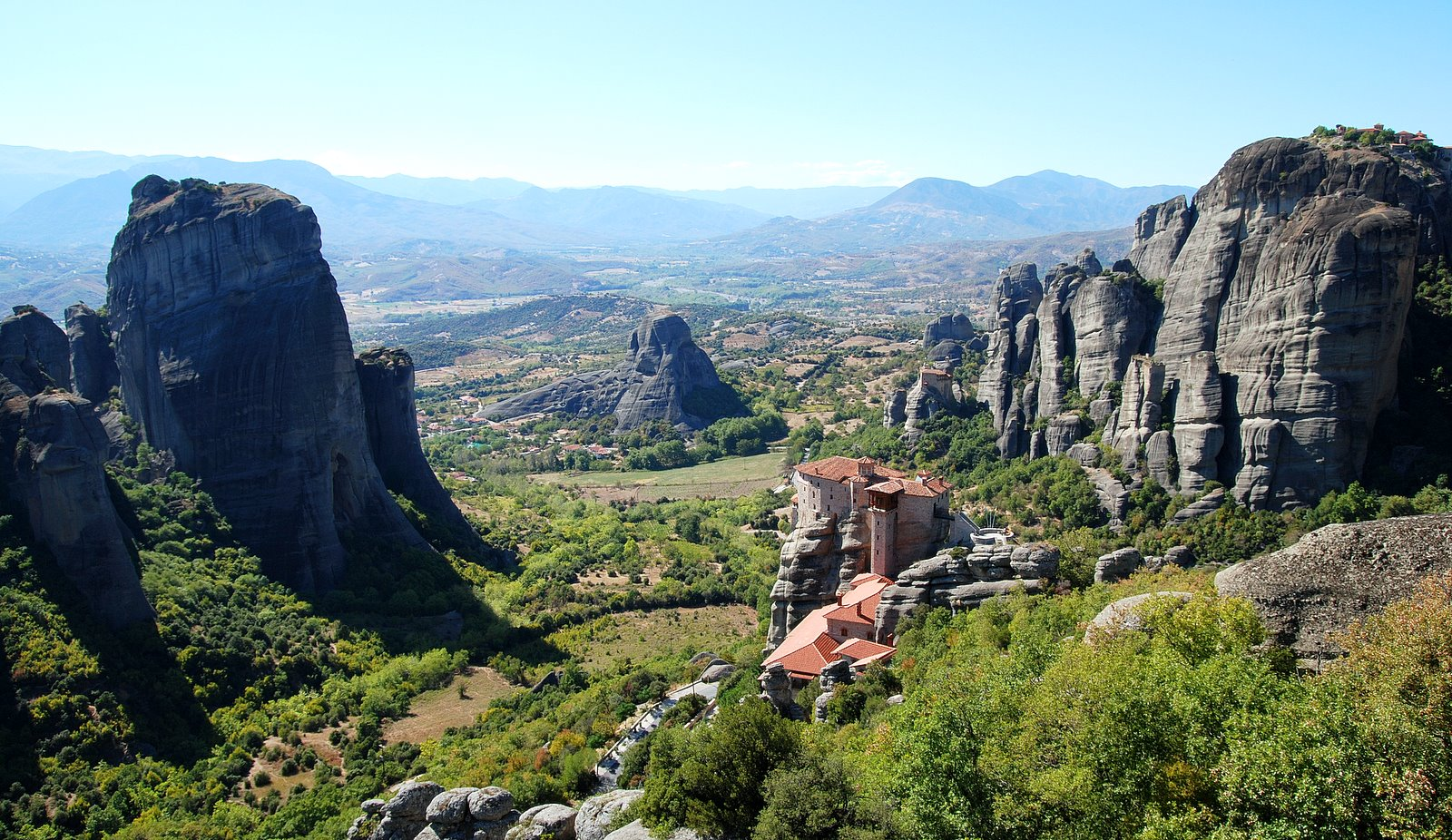
The Meteora in Thessaly

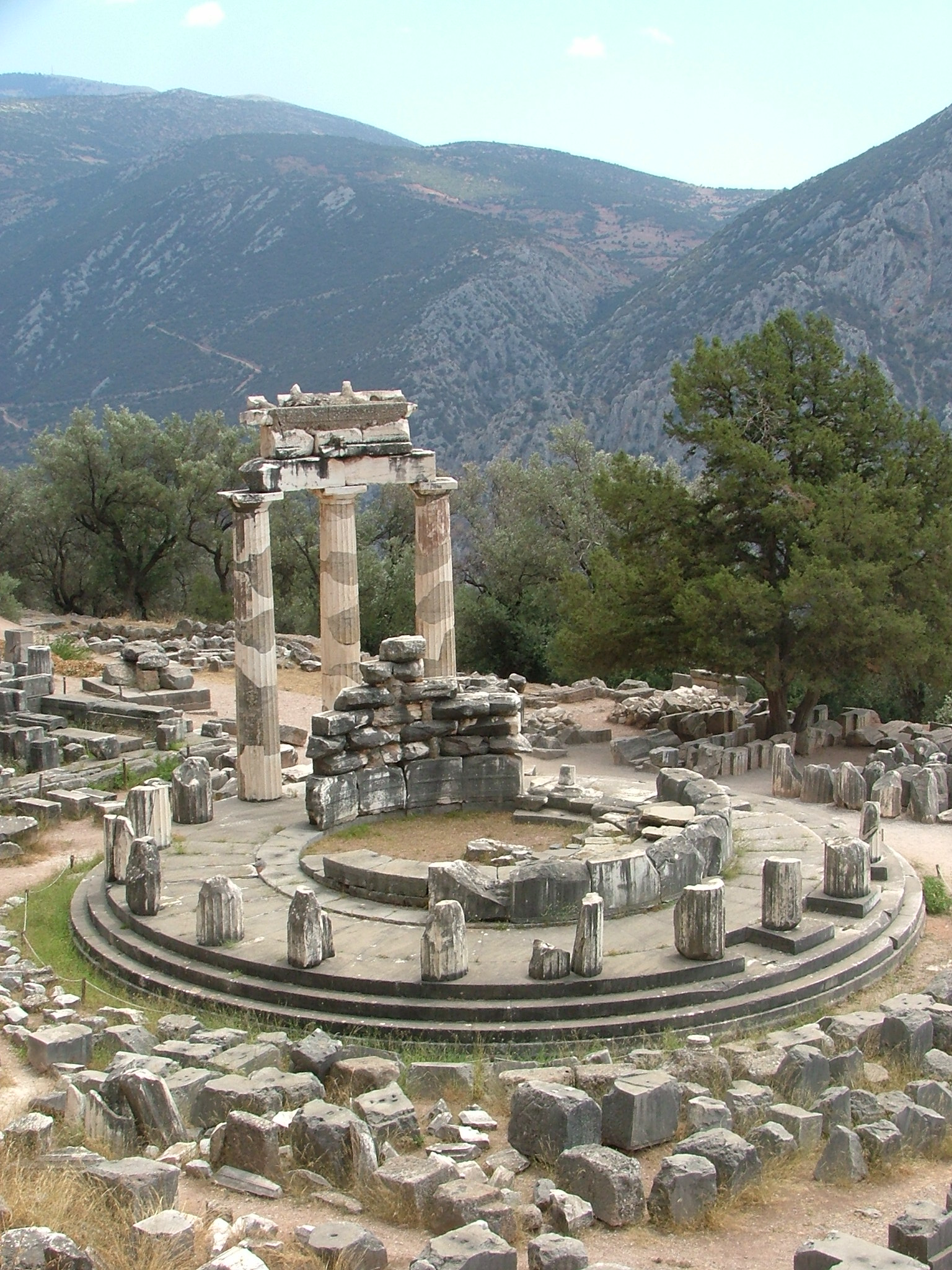
View of the archeological site of Delphi

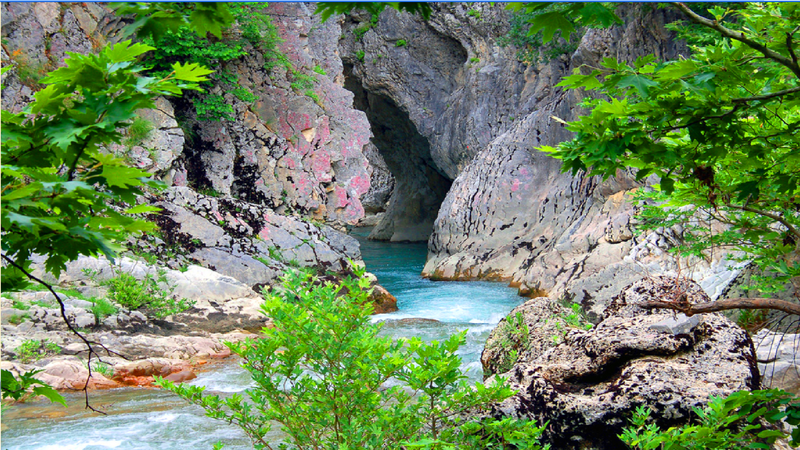
Canoeing in river Acheron in Epirus

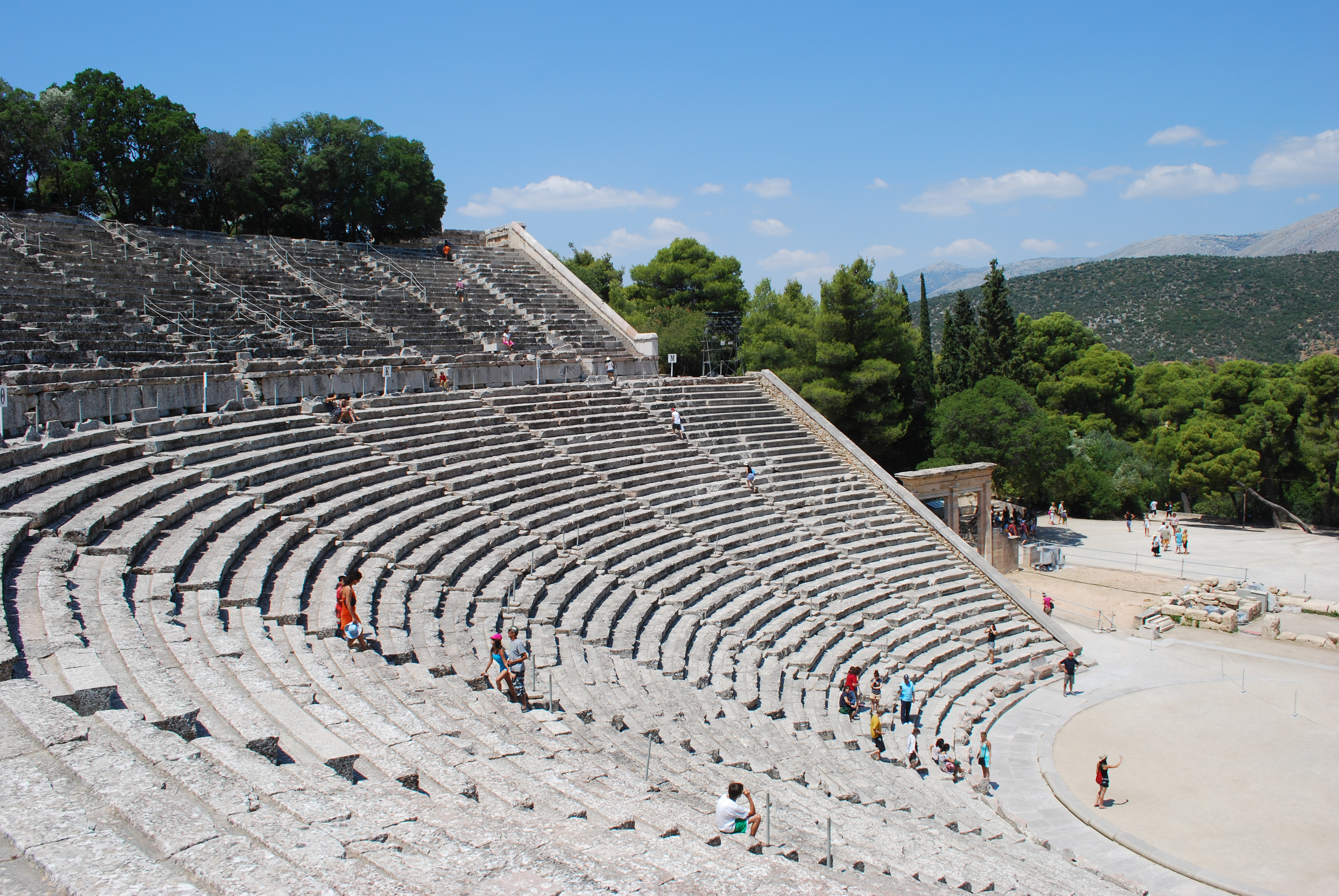
The ancient theatre of Epidaurus

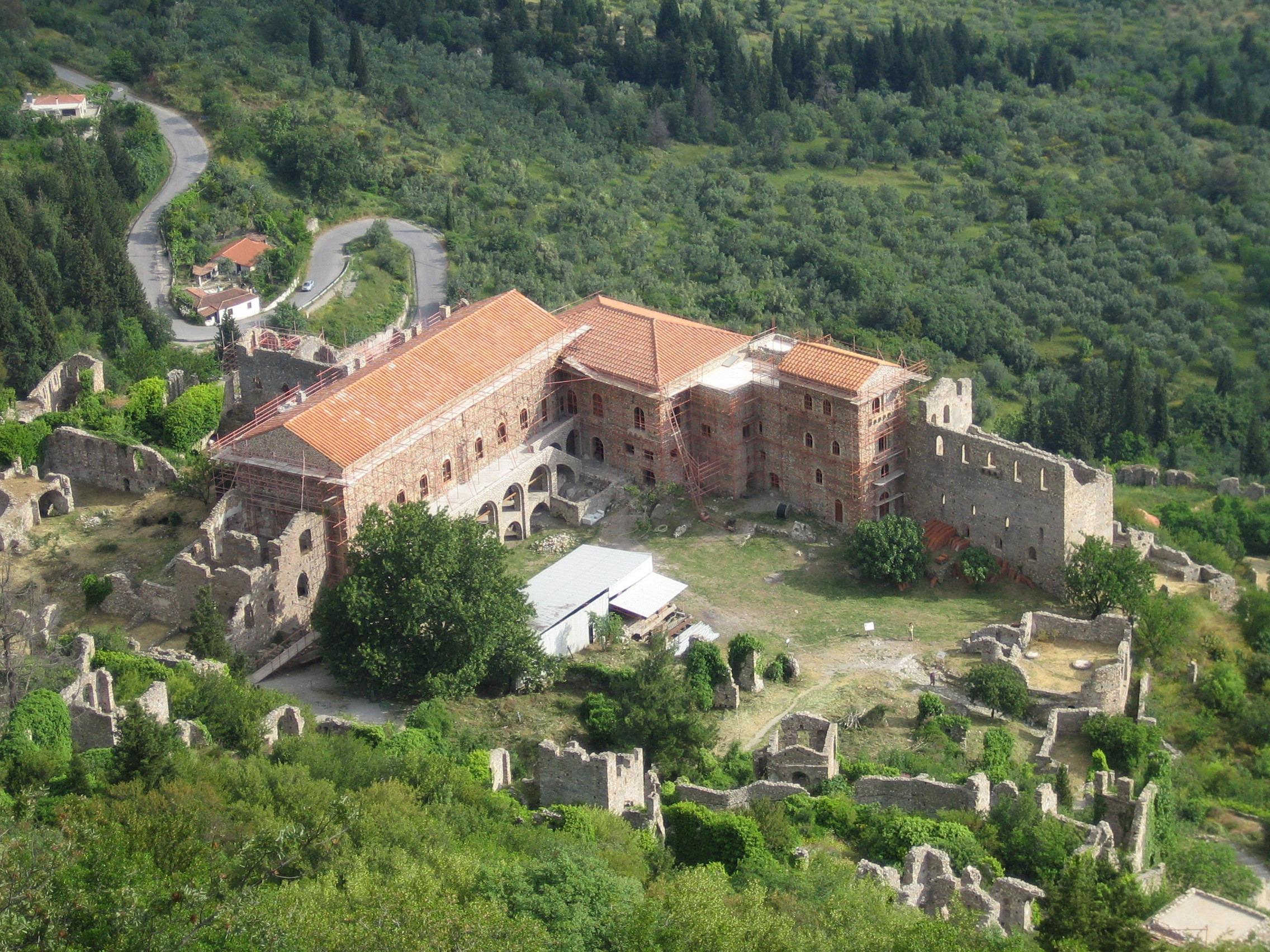
The Palace of Mystras, Peloponnese

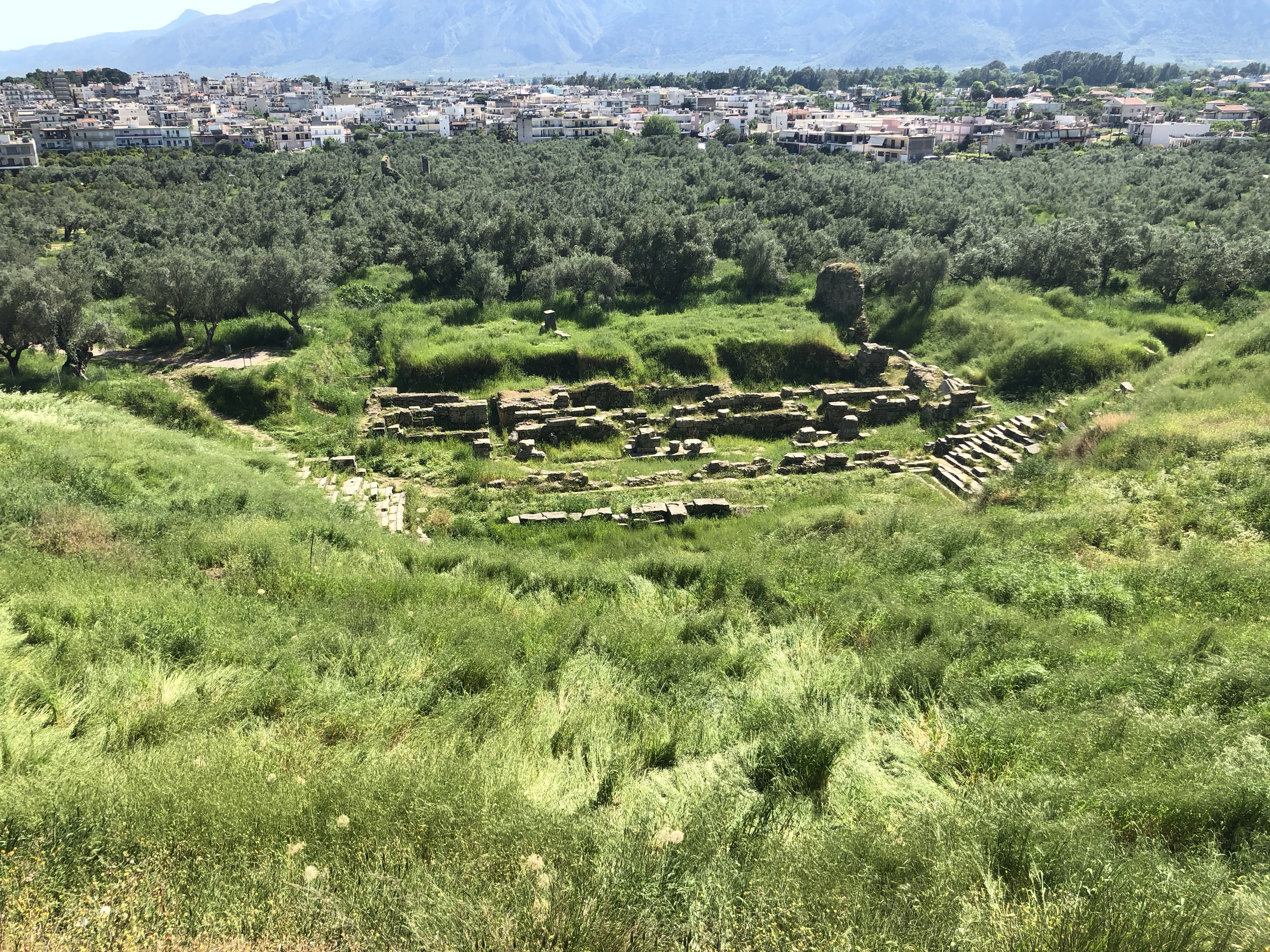
Theater of ancient Sparta, with modern Sparta and Mt. Taygetus in the background

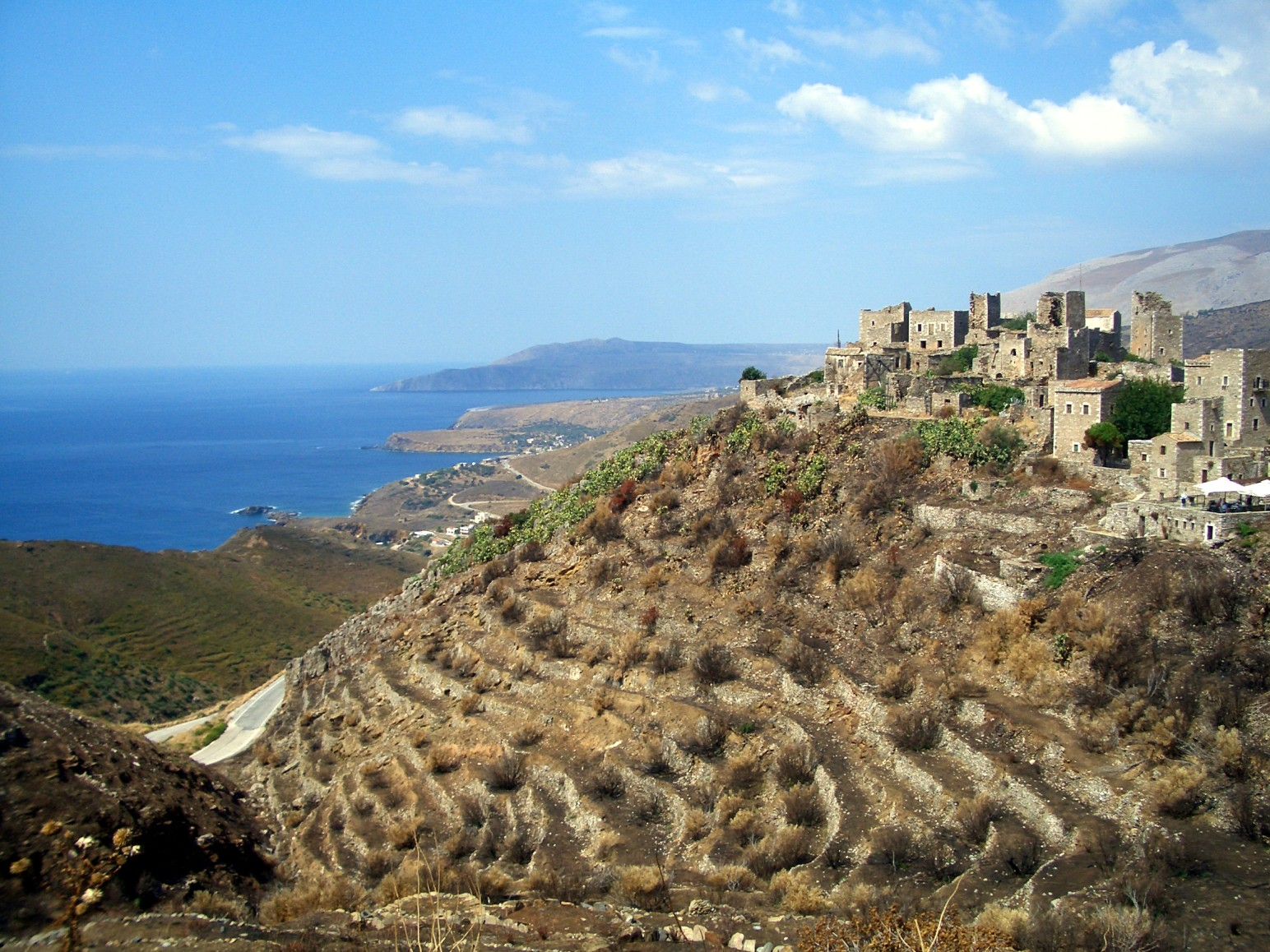
Towerhouses of Vatheia, Mani peninsula.

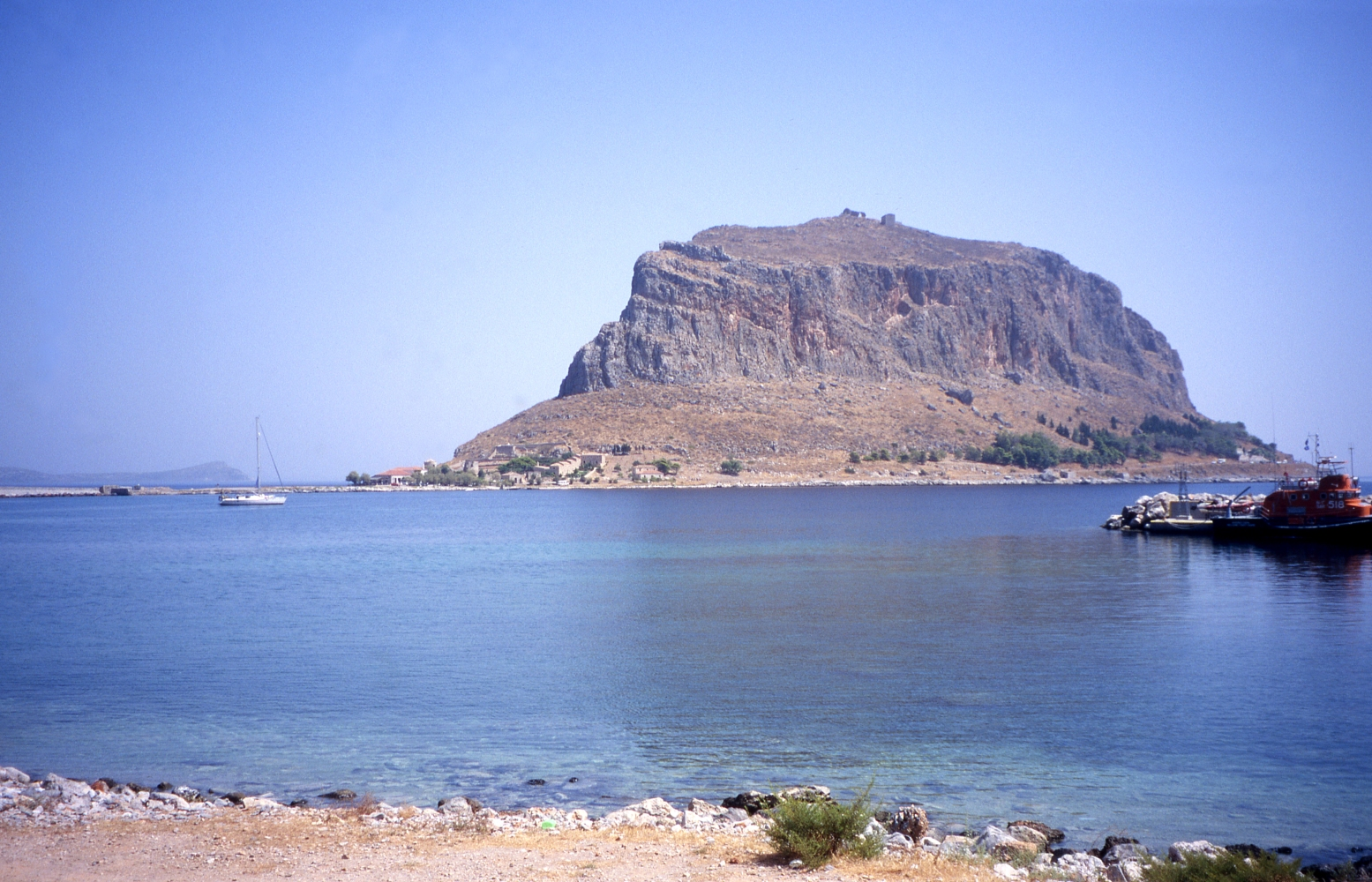
The Rock of Monemvasia

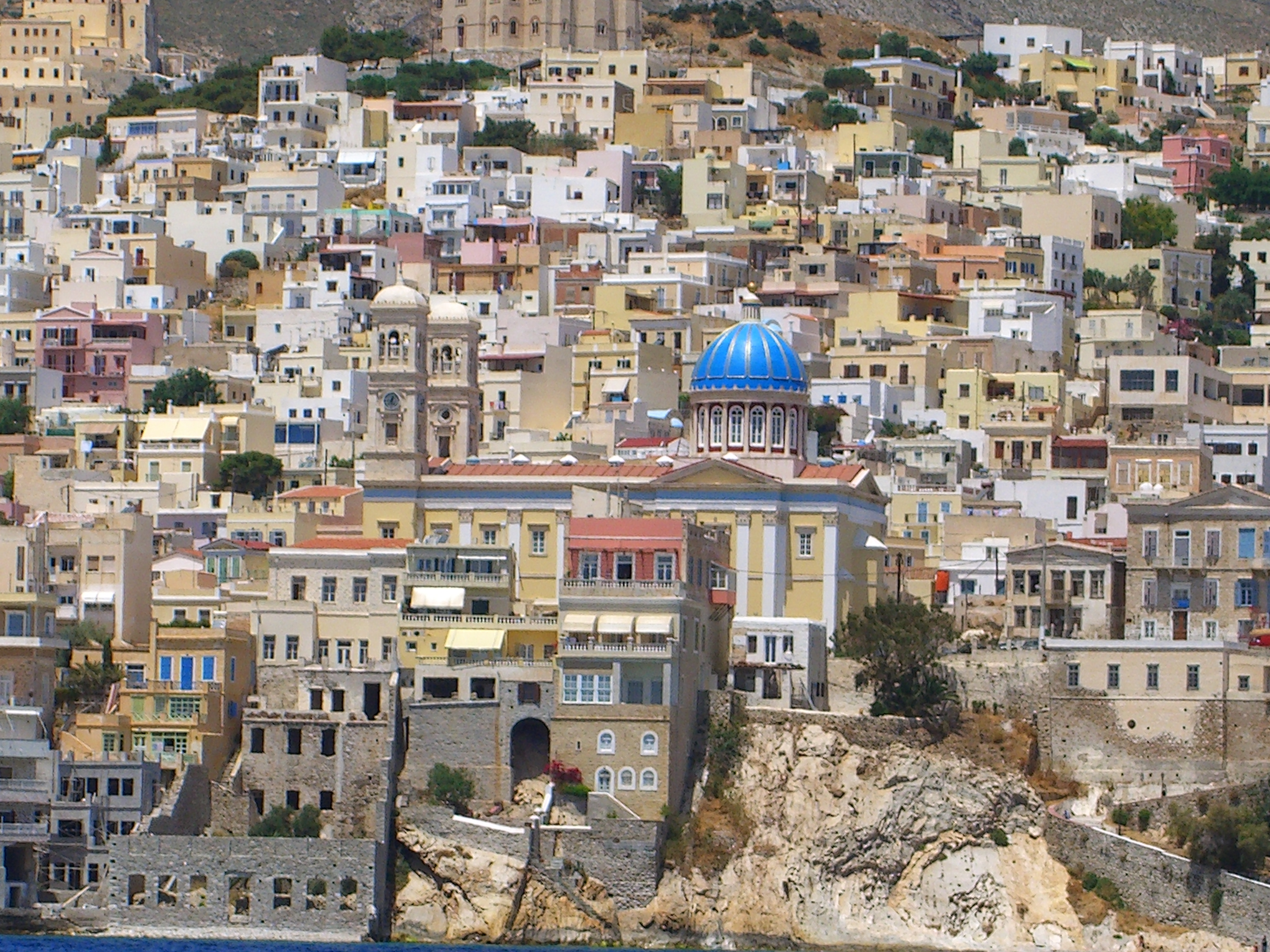
Ermoupoli, on Syros island, Cyclades

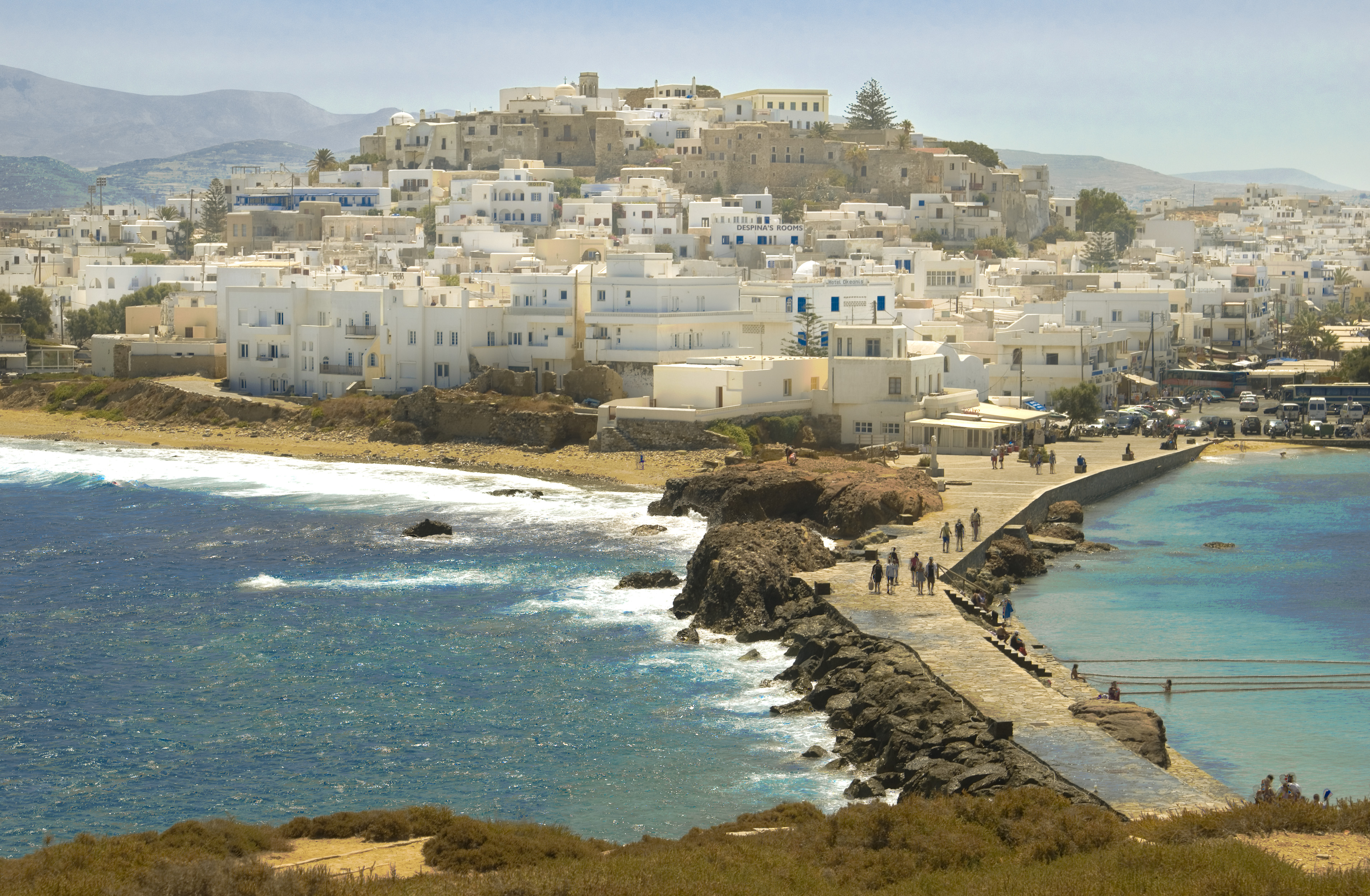
Naxos (city), on Naxos island, Cyclades

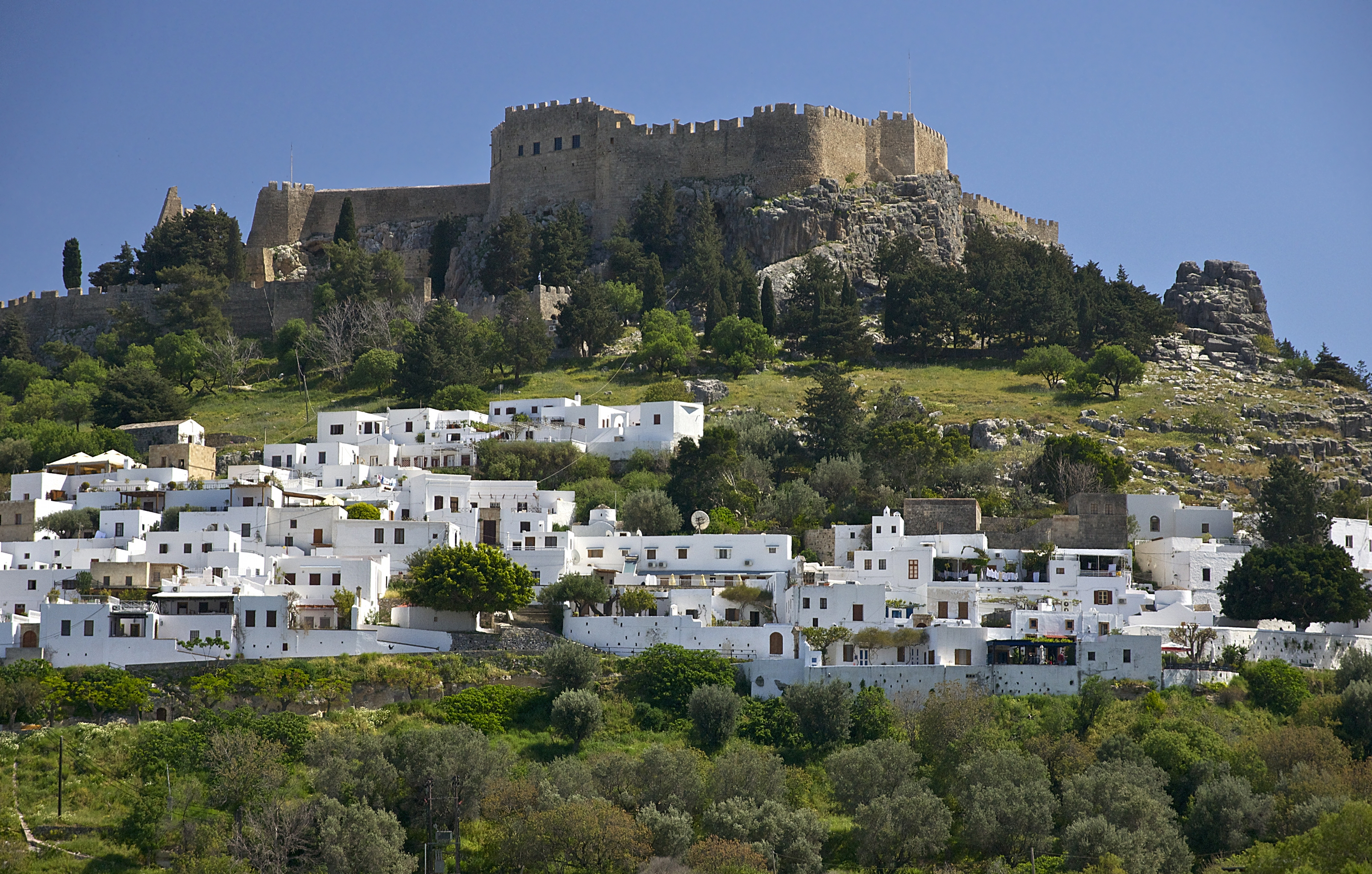
View of Lindos, Rhodes island

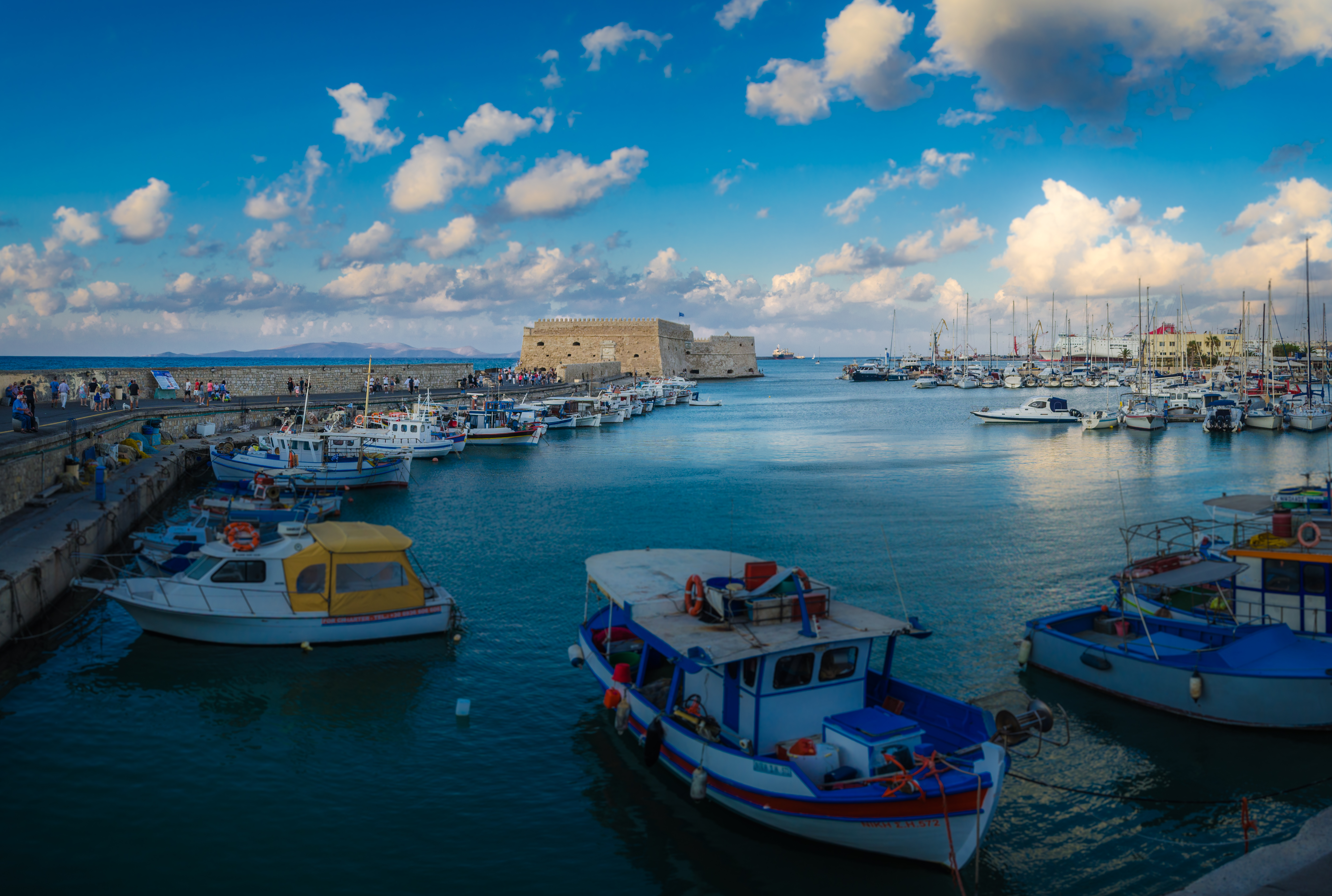
The port of the city of Heraklion, Crete

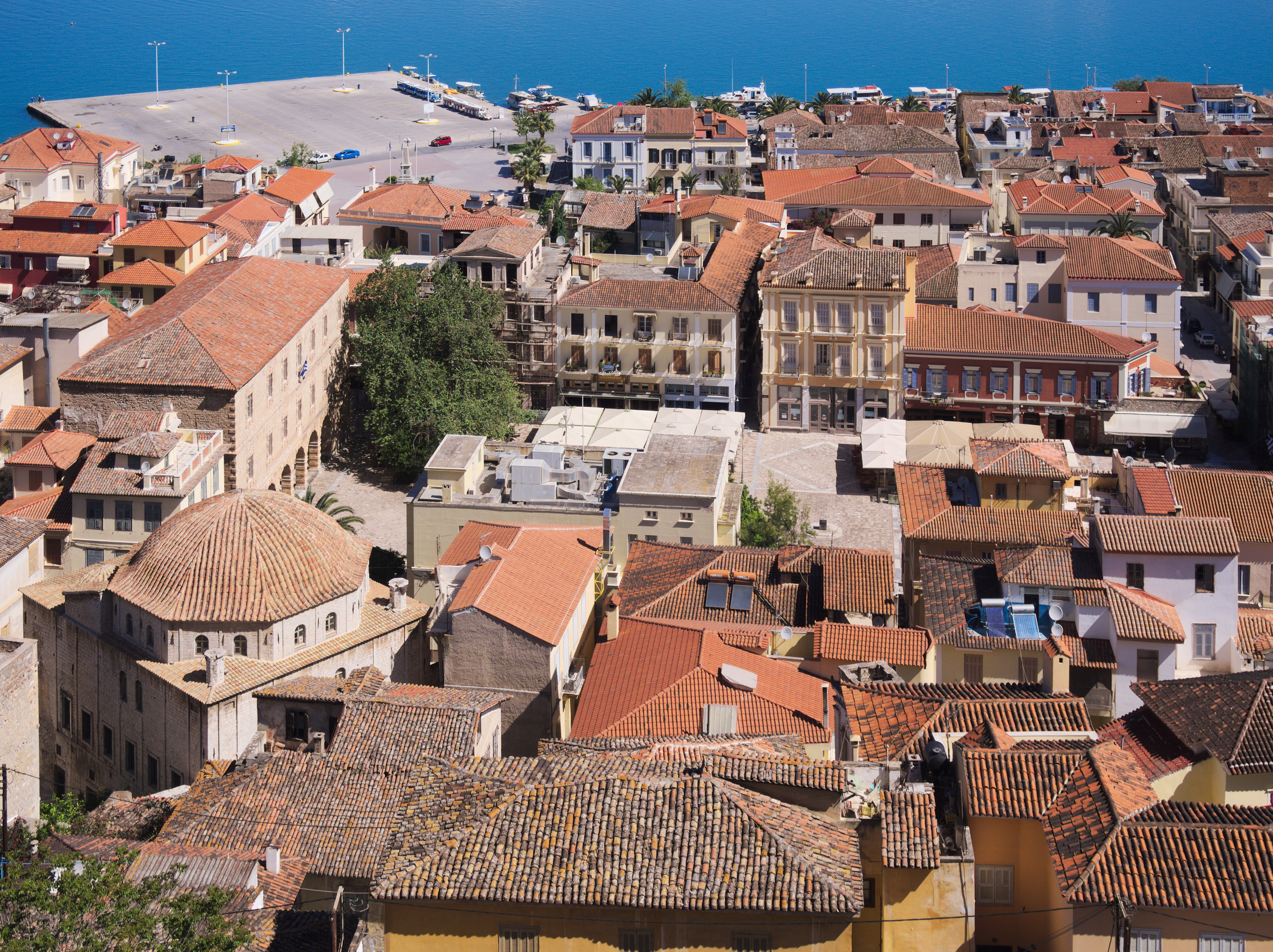
The city of Nafplio

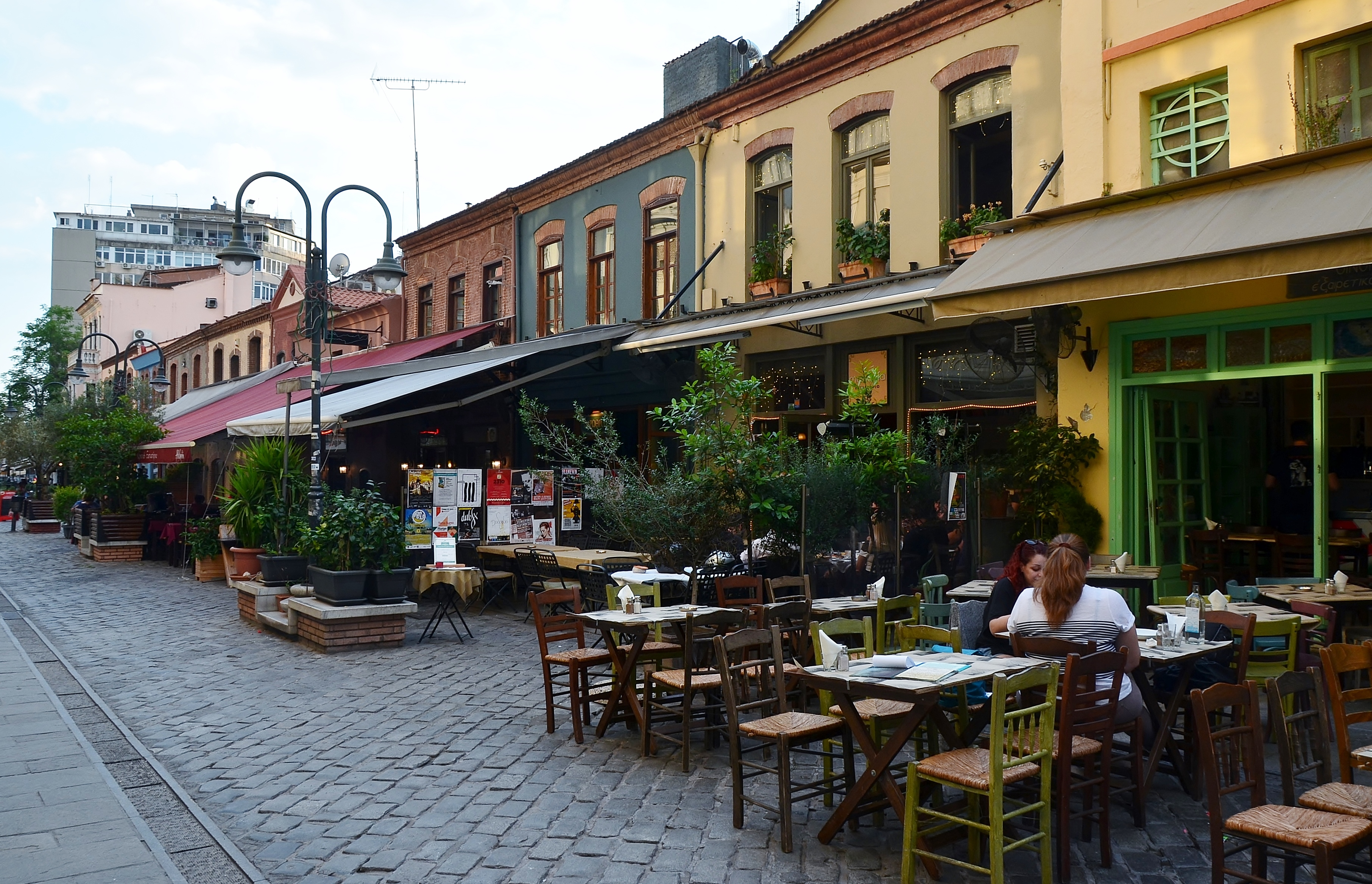
Greek restaurants in Ladadika, Thessaloniki

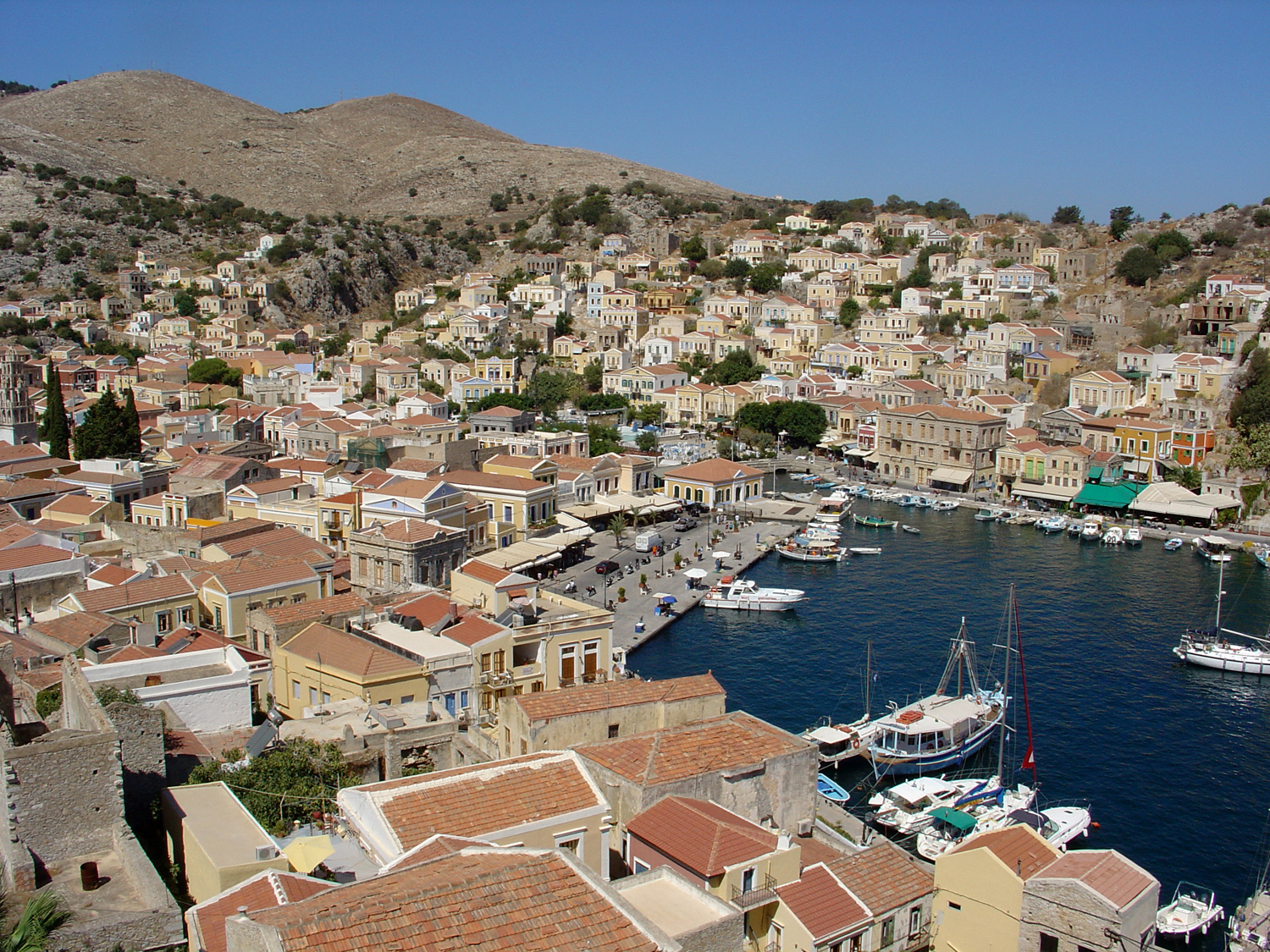
Symi island, South Aegean

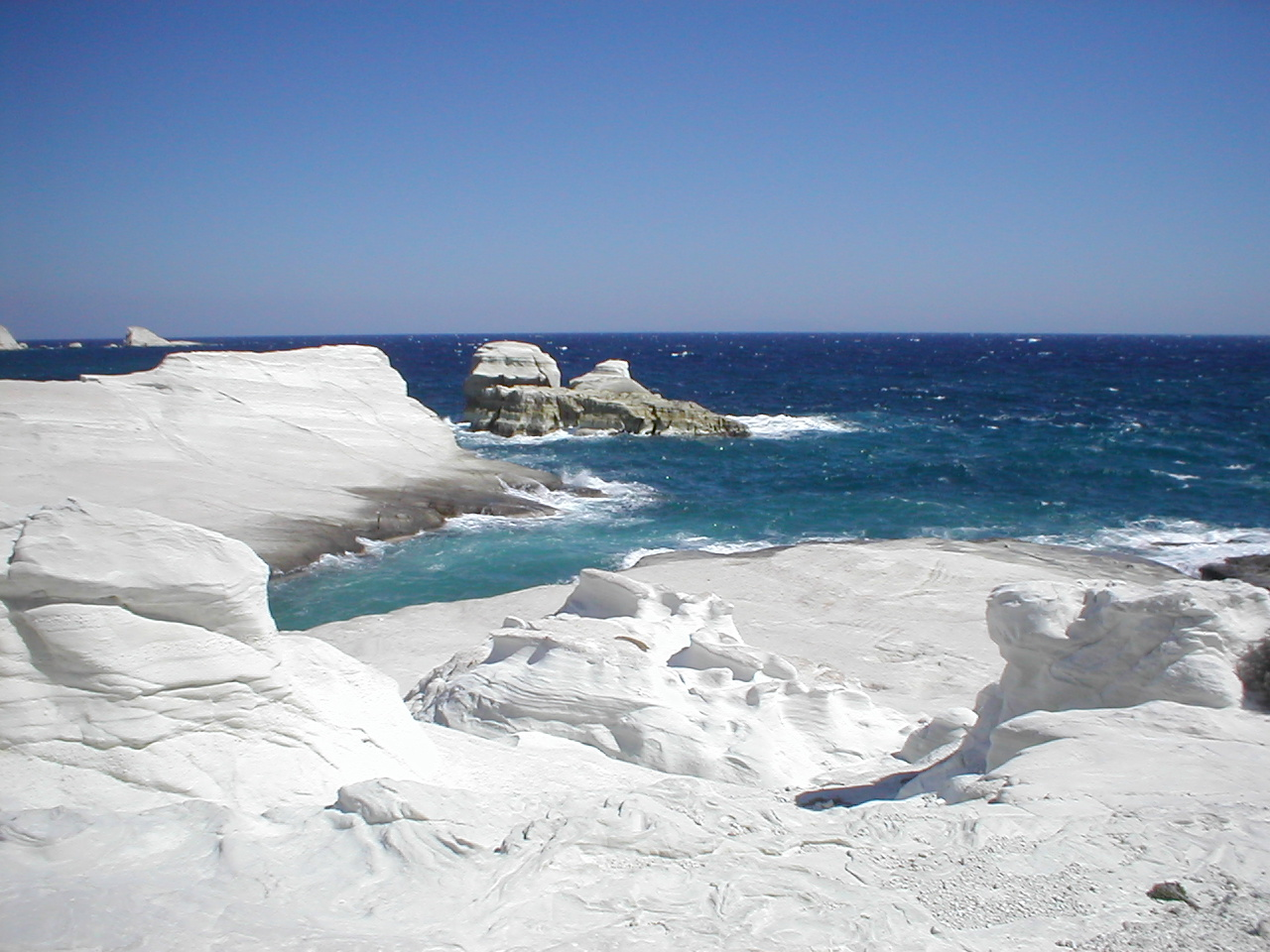
Sarakiniko Beach in Milos island, Cyclades

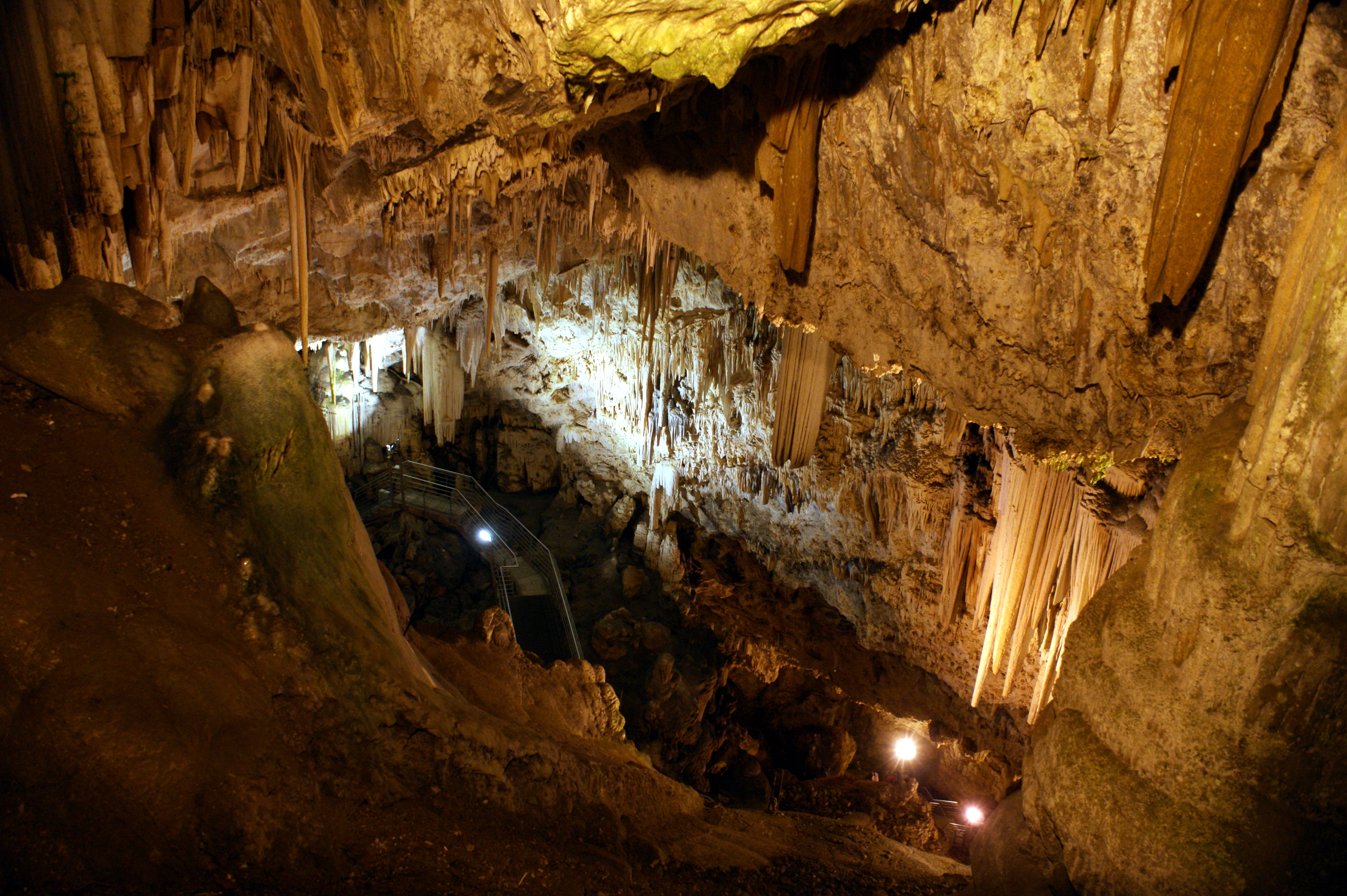
The Antiparos cavern, Antiparos

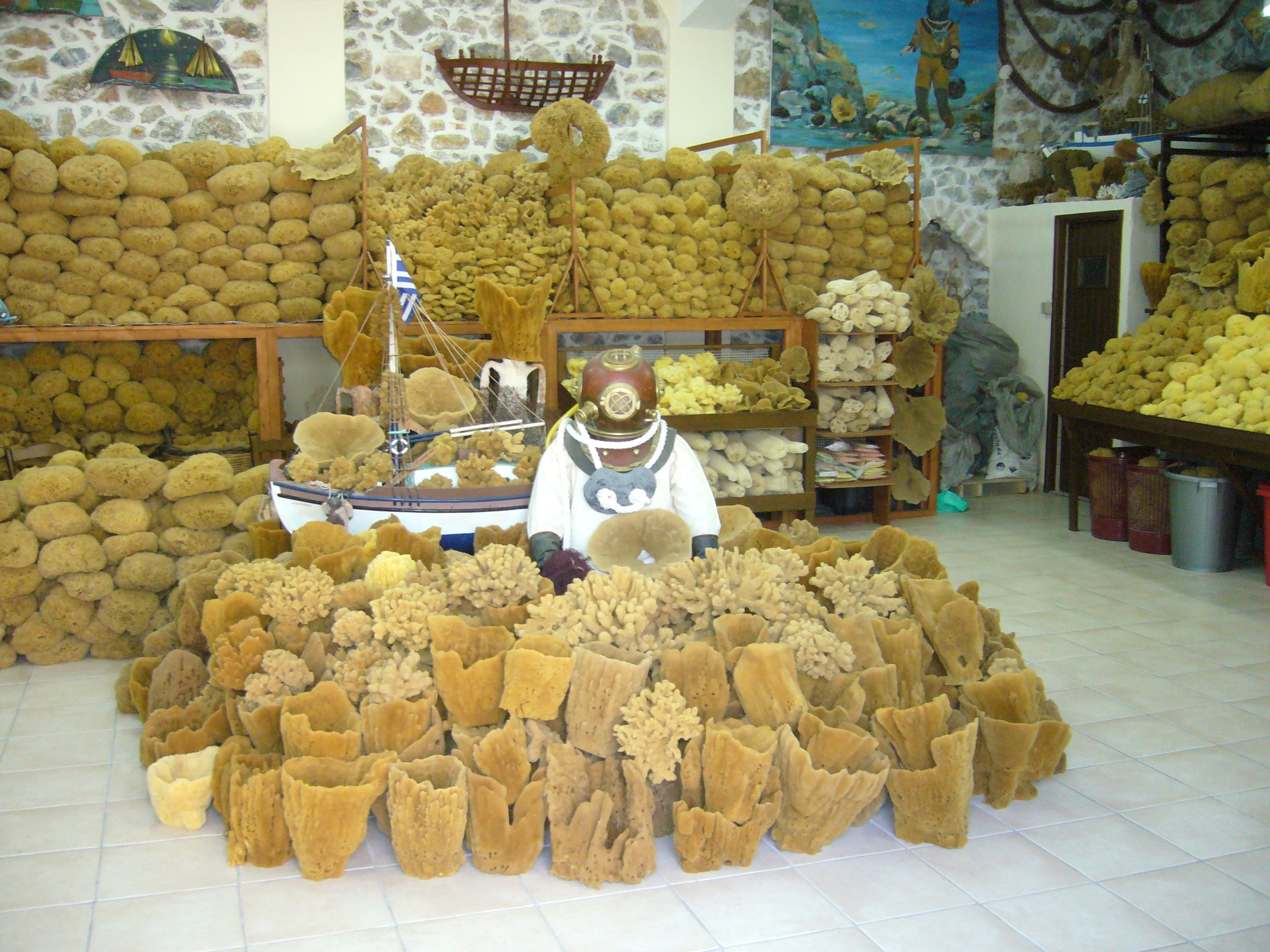
Natural sponges, Kalymnos

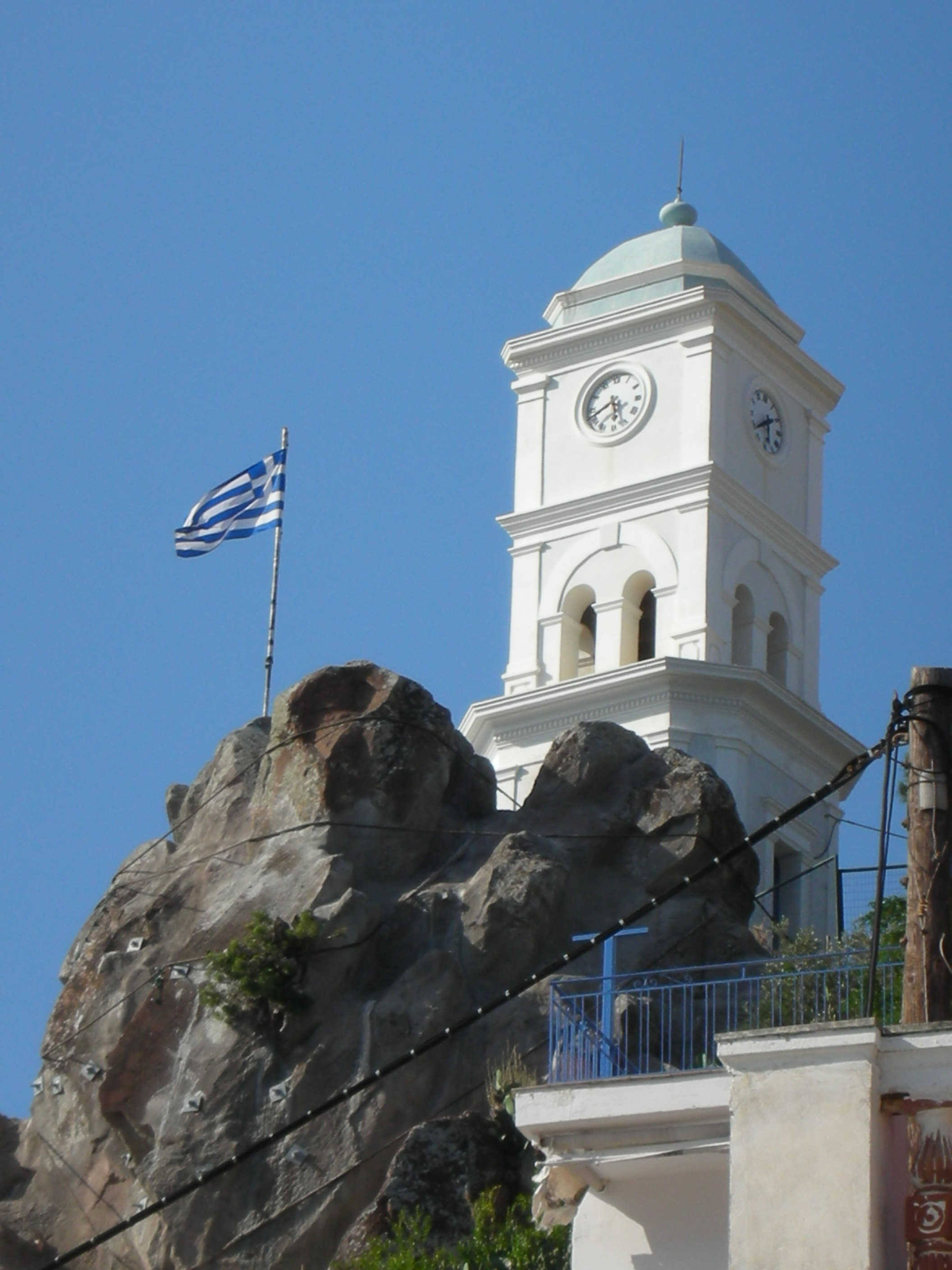
Poros clock tower, Poros

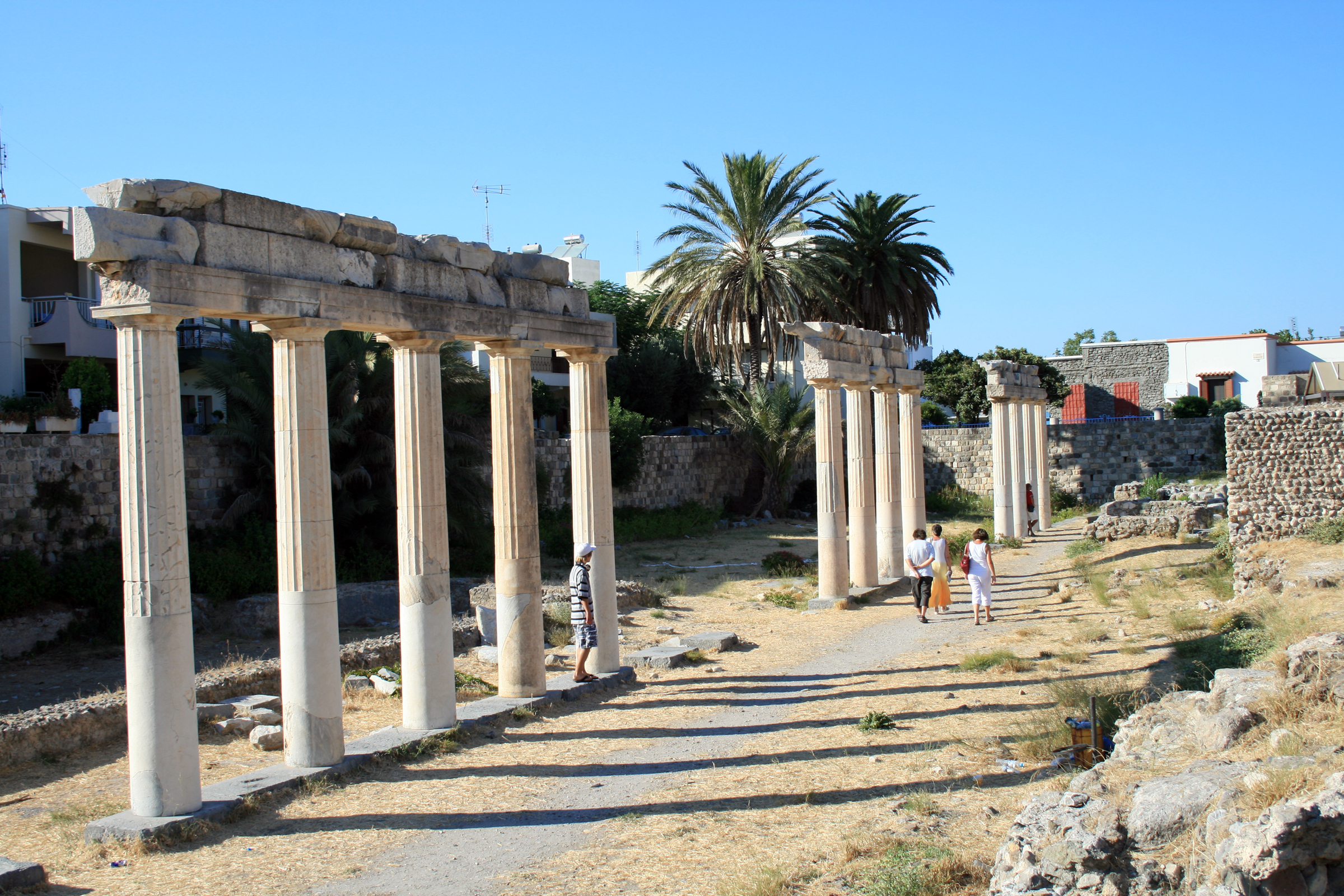
Ruins of the Ancient Gymnasion, Kos

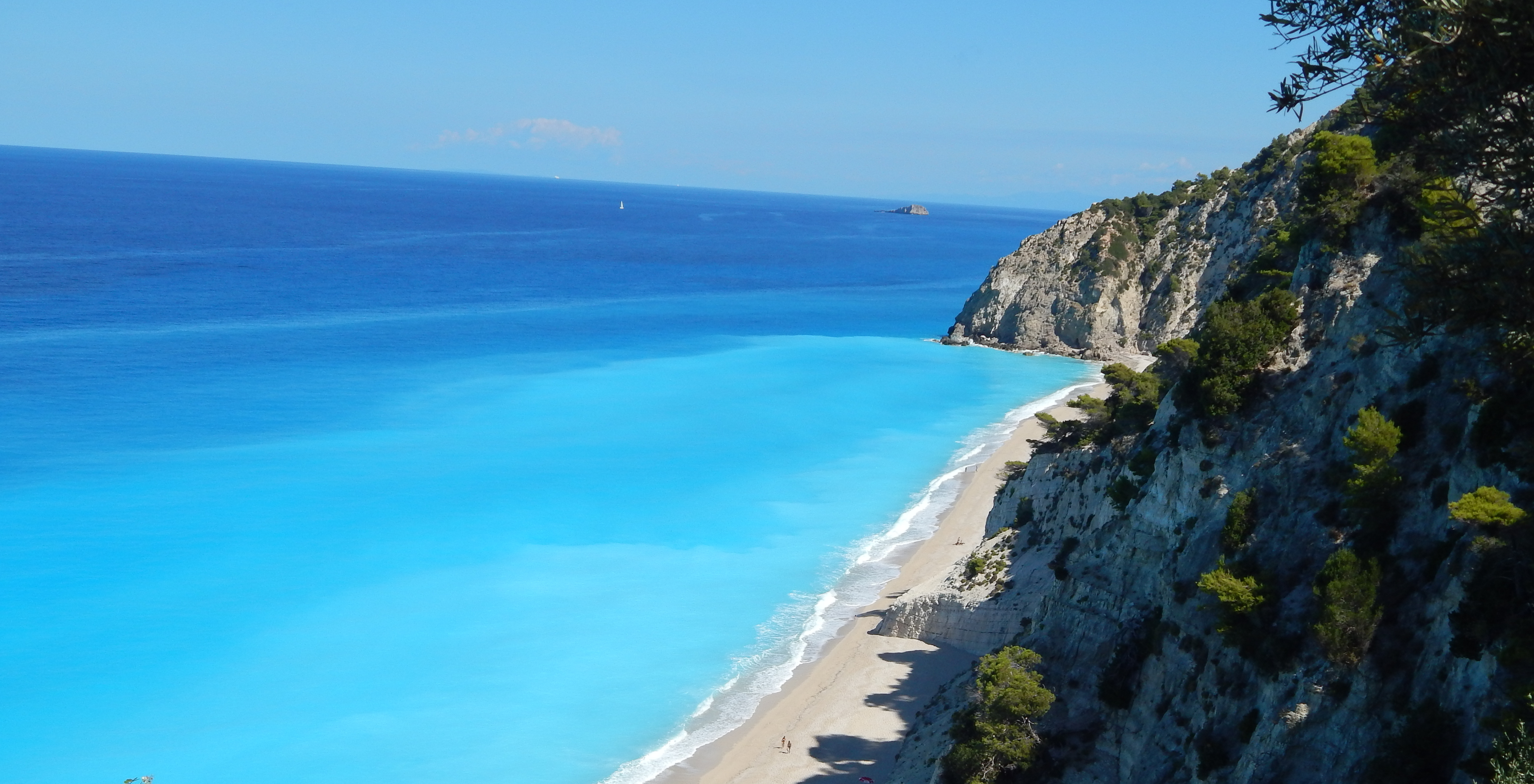
Egremnoi sand beach on the island of Lefkada

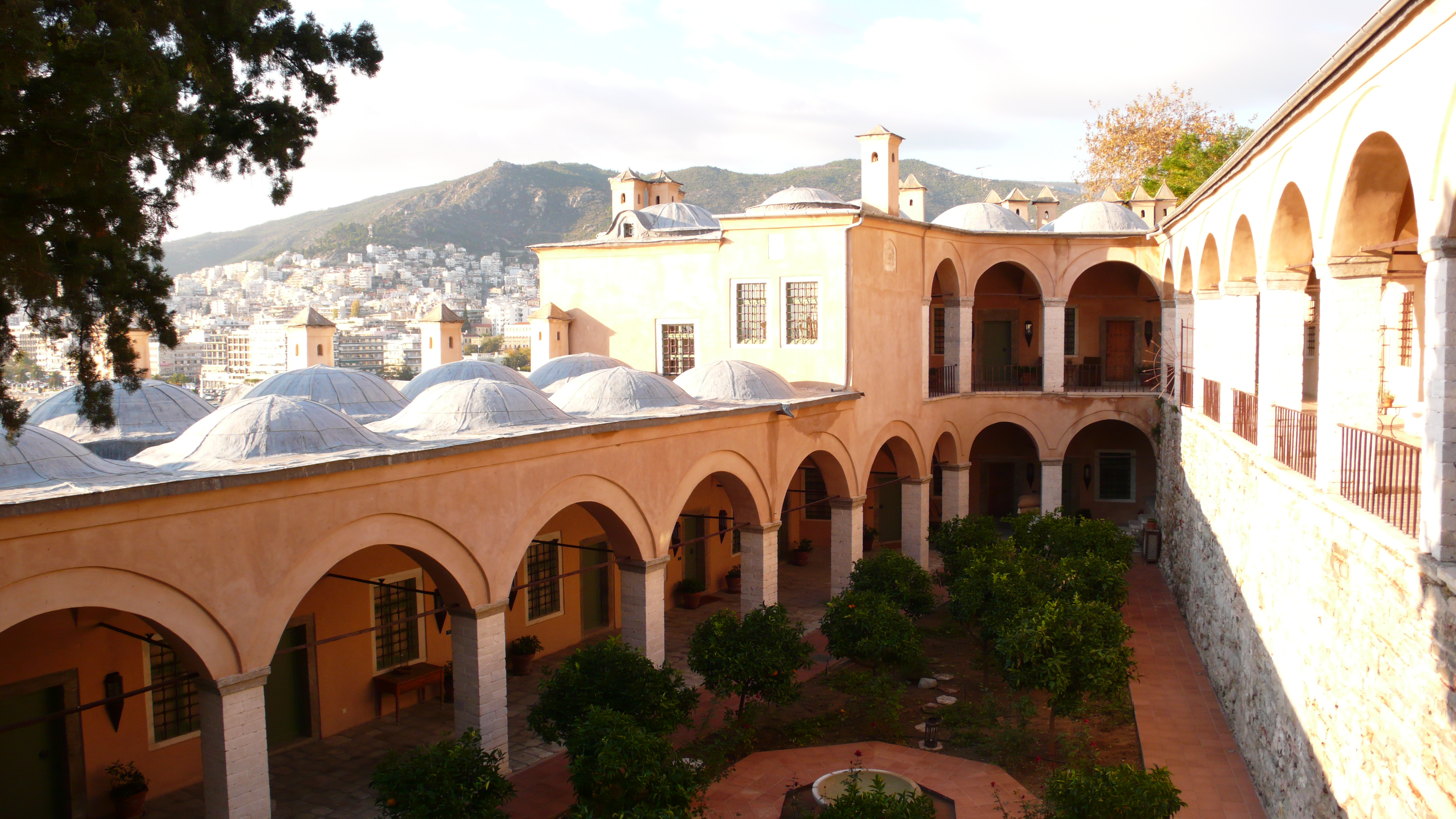
Imaret complex in Kavala

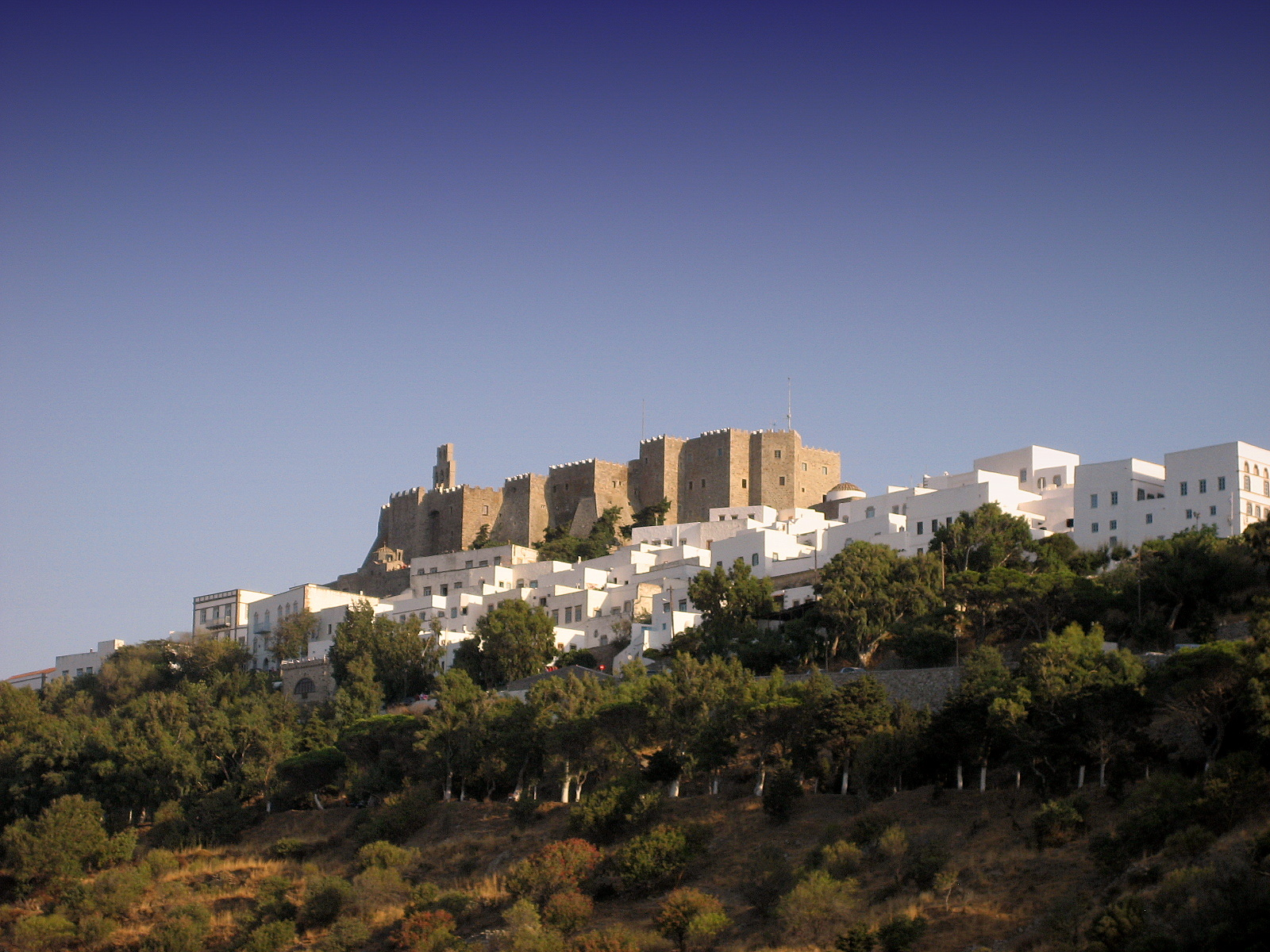
Castle of Patmos, Patmos

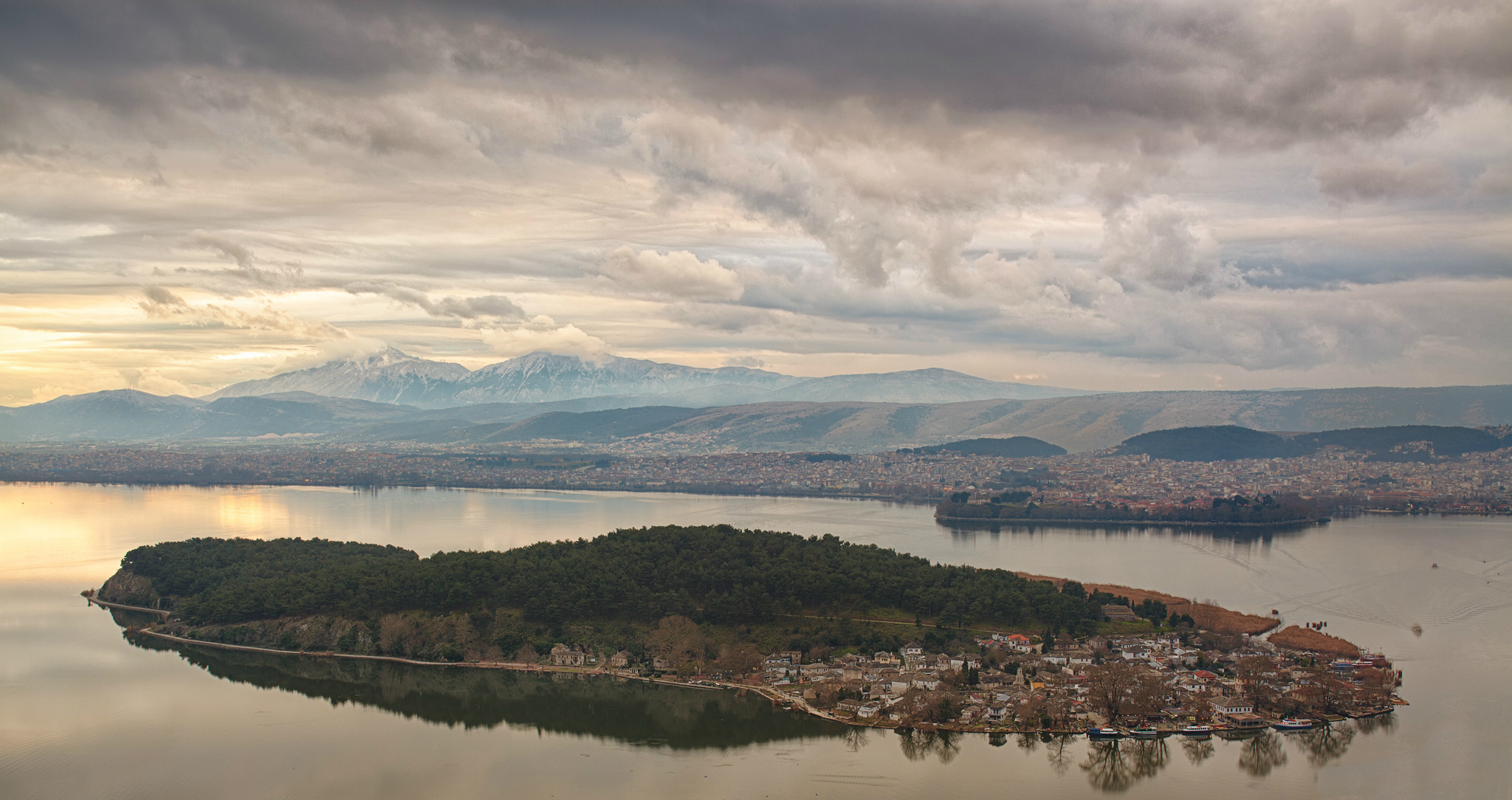
Ioannina Island

== See also ==
- Xenia
- Laiki agora
- Historic Hotels of Europe
