= Thessalian Radio Television =

TRT
- Country: Greece
- Broadcast area: Thessaly
- Network: HellasNet
- Headquarters: Athinon Avenue 84, Volos

Programming
- Language(s): Greek
- Picture format: 16:9 HD

Ownership
- Owner: Thessalian Radio TV S.A.

History
- Launched: February 5, 1990
- Founder: Angelos Antoniou

Links
- Webcast: Live Streaming
- Website: trttv.gr

The Thessalian Radio Television, also known as TRT (Thessaliki Radiofonia Tileorasi), was founded in 1989. It is a regional private television station that broadcasts in the region of Thessaly, Greece. It started broadcasting on 5 February 1990.

TRT has studios in five cities (Volos, Larissa, Karditsa, Trikala and Athens). The station broadcasts continuously and its programmes are targeted at a broad audience of all ages.

== Radio TRT 95.1 ==
Radio TRT 95.1 was launched on 29 October 1995 from the TRT studios of Larissa. The station operates around the clock, with a full program of entertaining and informative, with the collaboration of highly skilled and experienced journalists and producers, as well as many new outstanding partners. In a short time spent at the top of the ratings. From November 2011 rebroadcasts with Real FM 97.8.
