= Mikel Coffee Company =

Greek coffeehouse chain

- Type: S.A.
- Industry: Restaurants
- Genre: Coffee house
- Founded: 2008
- Founder: Eleftherios Kyriakakis
- Headquarters: Larissa, Greece
- Number of locations: 420+(2026)
- Area served: Greece, Cyprus, United Arab Emirates, United Kingdom, Bulgaria, Saudi Arabia, Canada, Turkey, North Macedonia, Kuwait, Jordan, Oman, Germany, Iraq, Serbia, Georgia, Kosovo, Egypt, Albania
- Key people: Eleftherios Kyriakakis (Chairman & CEO)
- Products: Coffee; Tea; Pastries; Frappuccino beverages Smoothies
- Services: Coffee
- Revenue: ▲€62.439 million (2014)
- Net income: ▲€12.133 million (2014)
- Number of employees: 3500 (2020)
- Website: www.mikelcoffee.com

Mikel Coffee Company, or Mikel, is a Greek coffeehouse chain, whose network consists of more than 400 coffee shops in 19 countries throughout the globe.

== History ==
The historical development of MIKEL began in 2008 with the opening of its initial coffee outlet in the Greek city of Larissa. Following the establishment of this first location, the enterprise initiated a gradual domestic expansion across Greece, using the city of Volos as its secondary operational starting point. To support this growth, the corporate entity Mikel Coffee Company S.A. was established in 2011. The following year, in 2012, the company restructured its business model through the creation of the Mikel Franchise network, launching its first 10 franchised locations. This shift led to rapid domestic growth; by 2013, the network had expanded to 60 stores, including its first location in the capital city of Athens, and by 2014, the total number of operational outlets across Greece reached 100.

International development became a primary focus in 2015 with the establishment of Mikel Coffee Company Ltd., a United Kingdom-based subsidiary headquartered in London designed specifically to manage global operations. The company's first market entry outside of Greece occurred in 2016 with the launch of a coffee store in the United Arab Emirates. This was followed by a Master Franchise agreement in Cyprus in 2017, which resulted in the establishment of 26 branches. By March 2018, the brand began direct operations in London and simultaneously expanded its European presence into Bulgaria. The corporate footprint extended into the Middle East in 2019 with openings in Saudi Arabia, followed by further regional expansion into Kuwait and Oman in 2021, Jordan in 2022, and Iraq in 2023.

The company continued its expansion across diverse international markets. In 2020, MIKEL entered Canada, North Macedonia, and Turkey, with the latter market growing to encompass 93 branches. European integration progressed further with openings in Germany in 2023, followed by Serbia and Georgia in 2024. The expansion strategy continued into 2025, during which the brand established its first operational locations in Kosovo, Albania, and the North African market via Egypt. By 2026, the company's global network had scaled to a total of 403 corporate and franchised stores worldwide.

== Brand ==
The brand name, stylised as "MIKEL", stands for "Maybe it's knowledge entering life", the company's motto. The brand logo features the father of its founder, Eleftherios Kyriakakis.

== Locations ==
As of November 2026 there were 403 stores in the following 19 countries

| Country | Number of stores |
|---|---|
| Greece | 256 |
| Turkey | 88 |
| Cyprus | 26 |
| Bulgaria | 5 |
| North Macedonia | 5 |
| Saudi Arabia | 4 |
| Kuwait | 3 |
| Albania | 3 |
| Kosovo | 2 |
| Germany | 2 |
| Canada | 1 |
| United Arab Emirates | 1 |
| United Kingdom | 1 |
| Oman | 1 |
| Jordan | 1 |
| Iraq | 1 |
| Serbia | 1 |
| Georgia | 1 |
| Egypt | 1 |
