= Yeni Mosque, Larissa =

Former mosque in Larissa, Greece

Yeni Mosque
- Γενί Τζαμί
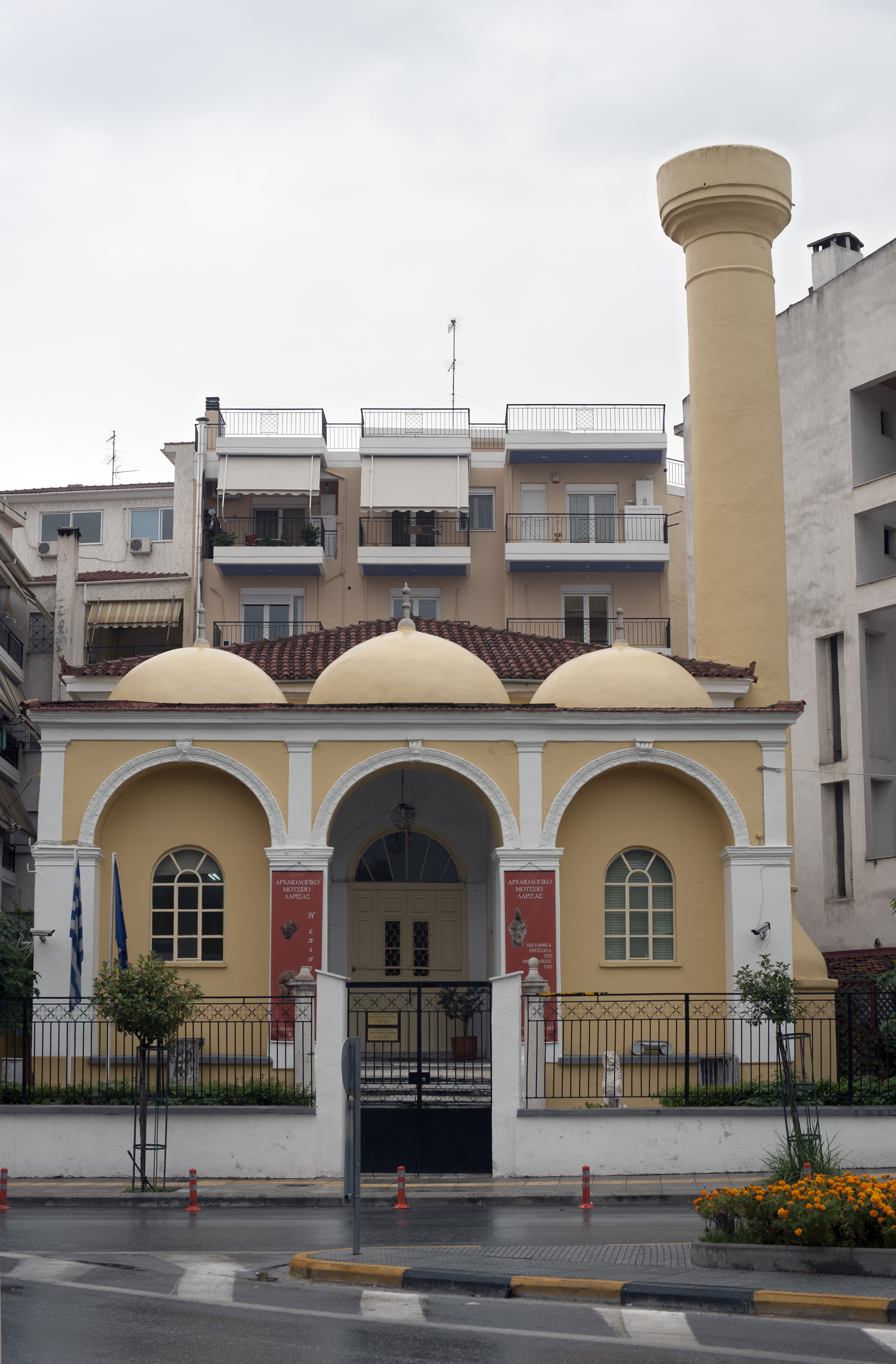
- The former mosque in 2011, as the Larissa Archaeological Museum

- Location of the former mosque in Greece

Religion
- Affiliation: Islam (former)
- Ecclesiastical or organizational status: Mosque (c. 1881–1924)
- Status: Abandoned (as a mosque); Repurposed (for cultural use)

Location
- Location: Larissa, Thessaly
- Country: Greece
- Interactive map of Yeni Mosque
- Coordinates: 39°38′22″N 22°25′12″E

Architecture
- Type: Mosque
- Style: Neoclassical
- Completed: c. 1881

Specifications
- Dome: 3
- Minaret: 1
- Materials: Brick; stone

The Yeni Mosque (Greek: Γενί Τζαμί, from Turkish: Yeni Camii, lit. 'New Mosque') is a former mosque in Larissa, in the Thessaly region of Greece. Completed in c. 1881 during the Ottoman era, the mosque was abandoned in 1924 and subsequently repurposed for cultural use.

== Overview ==
The mosque was built around the turn of the 20th century, in the centre of the city, at 31is Avgoustou Road. Its exact date of construction, as well as its founder, are unknown, but the neoclassical decoration both on the exterior as well as in the interior point to sometime in the 19th century. It was the last of several mosques built in the city under Ottoman rule, whence its name.

The mosque continued to be used by the local Muslims until 1924, when they left in consequence of the Greco-Turkish population exchange. From 1939 to 1941 building was used to house the Municipal Library and a small archaeological collection, which was partly looted by the occupying forces during the Axis occupation of Greece. The earthquakes of 1941, 1955, 1957, and 1980 damaged the building. From the late 1950s until 2011 the building housed the Larissa Archaeological Museum.

The building is square-shaped, featuring a prayer hall with nine arched windows and a four-sided, tile-covered roof. The entrance has a tripartite portico covered by three half-domes. The minaret on the northwestern corner survives up to the balcony.

== See also ==
- Islam in Greece
- Ottoman Greece
- List of former mosques in Greece
