= Orient Bikes =

Orient Bikes is a Greek manufacturer of bicycles established in Larissa in 1987. However the company has been doing biking business since 1945. The main activity of the company started with imports of bicycles, spare parts and accessories and their distribution. Despite being a typical Greek family business, Orient Bikes has an annual production of 64,000 bicycles and its models cover a wide range of designs and uses.

The current company is the successor to an earlier trading company owned by same family, Kokotis A. Bros S.A.
