= Ottoman baths of Larissa =

Historical hamam in Larissa, Greece

Coordinates: 39°38′23.1″N 22°24′58.3″E

The Ottoman baths of Larissa (Greek: Οθωμανικά λουτρά της Λάρισας), in Ottoman times known as the Great Baths (Turkish: Büyük Hamam), is a partially preserved Ottoman bath (hamam) in Larissa, Greece.

The baths are located at the junction of Eleftheriou Venizelou and Filellinon streets. The date of its construction and its founder are unknown, but may be the work of the heirs of Turahan Bey in the 15th century. From 19th-century archives it is known that in the 17th century the baths belonged to the vakf of the Sheikh yahya Hamevi Kadri tekke.

Originally the structure occupied the entire block, but already by the time of the annexation of Thessaly into Greece in 1881, it had ceased to function as a bath and its interior had been divided into smaller shops. As a result of the various uses and alterations imposed on the building, the state of preservation is poor. At present, only a portion of the original building survives, in large part incorporated in the newer buildings erected there in modern times. The original bath had a monumental character, as exemplified by the surviving 13 metres (43 ft) diameter dome, and comprised an elongated structure with two large domes, with rooms arranged on the east–west axis. Today the large central dome of the vestibule of the men's section survives, which now houses a series of shops on Eleftheriou Venizelou Street, as well as smaller domed halls in the basement and the ground level with the passages connecting them.
