= Hegesaratus =

Hegesaratus was descended from an ancient and noble family of Larissa in Thessaly, and was leader of the Pompeian party in that city during the civil war in 48 BC. He had been greatly befriended by Cicero while consul, and proved himself grateful to his benefactor, who strongly recommended Hegesaratus to Servius Sulpicius Rufus, proconsul of Achaia in that year.
