= Larissa =

City in Thessaly, Greece

Larissa Λάρισα (Greek)
- Municipality
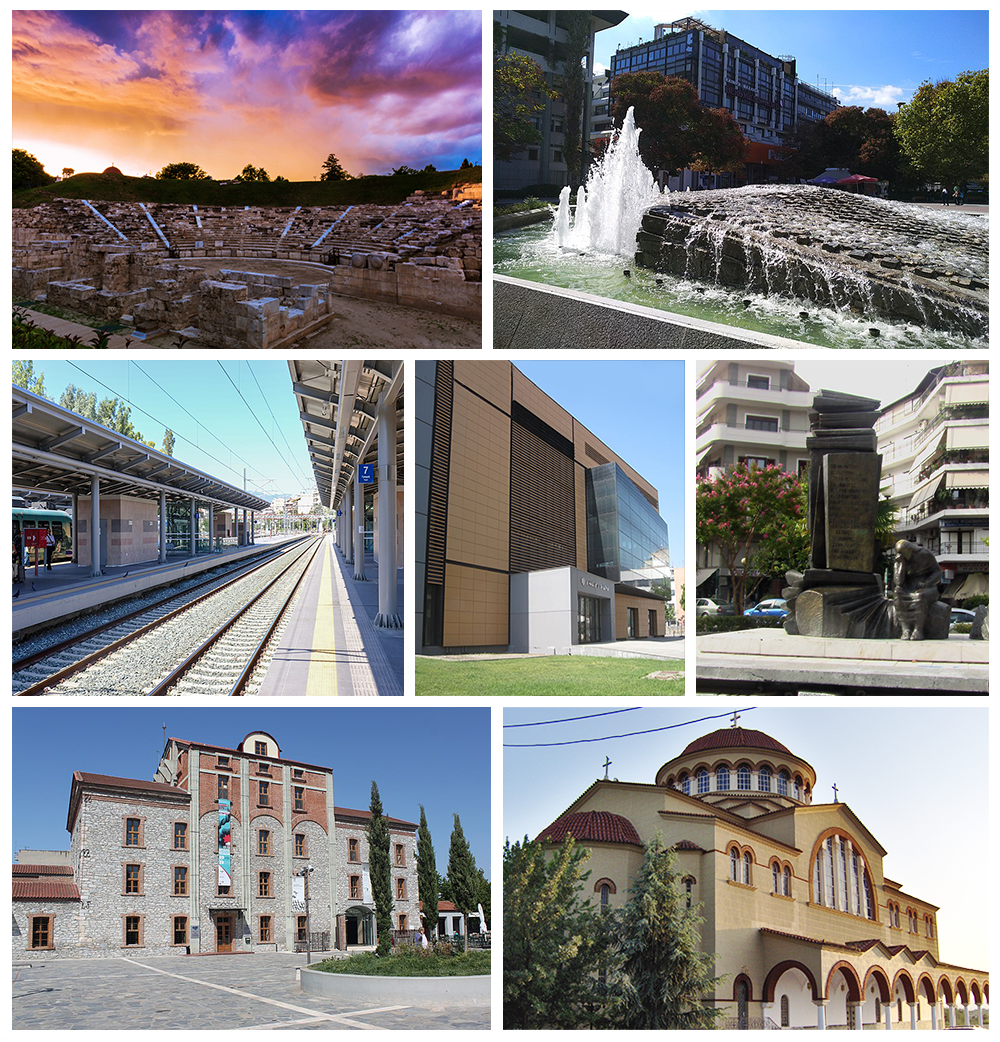
- Clockwise from top: Central Square in downtown Larissa with the "Floating River" fountain, Municipal Theatre OUHL (Thessalian Theatre), Holocaust monument, Saint Achilles Cathedral, Old Mills of Pappas, Larissa railway station, and the First Ancient Theatre of Larissa.

- Seal

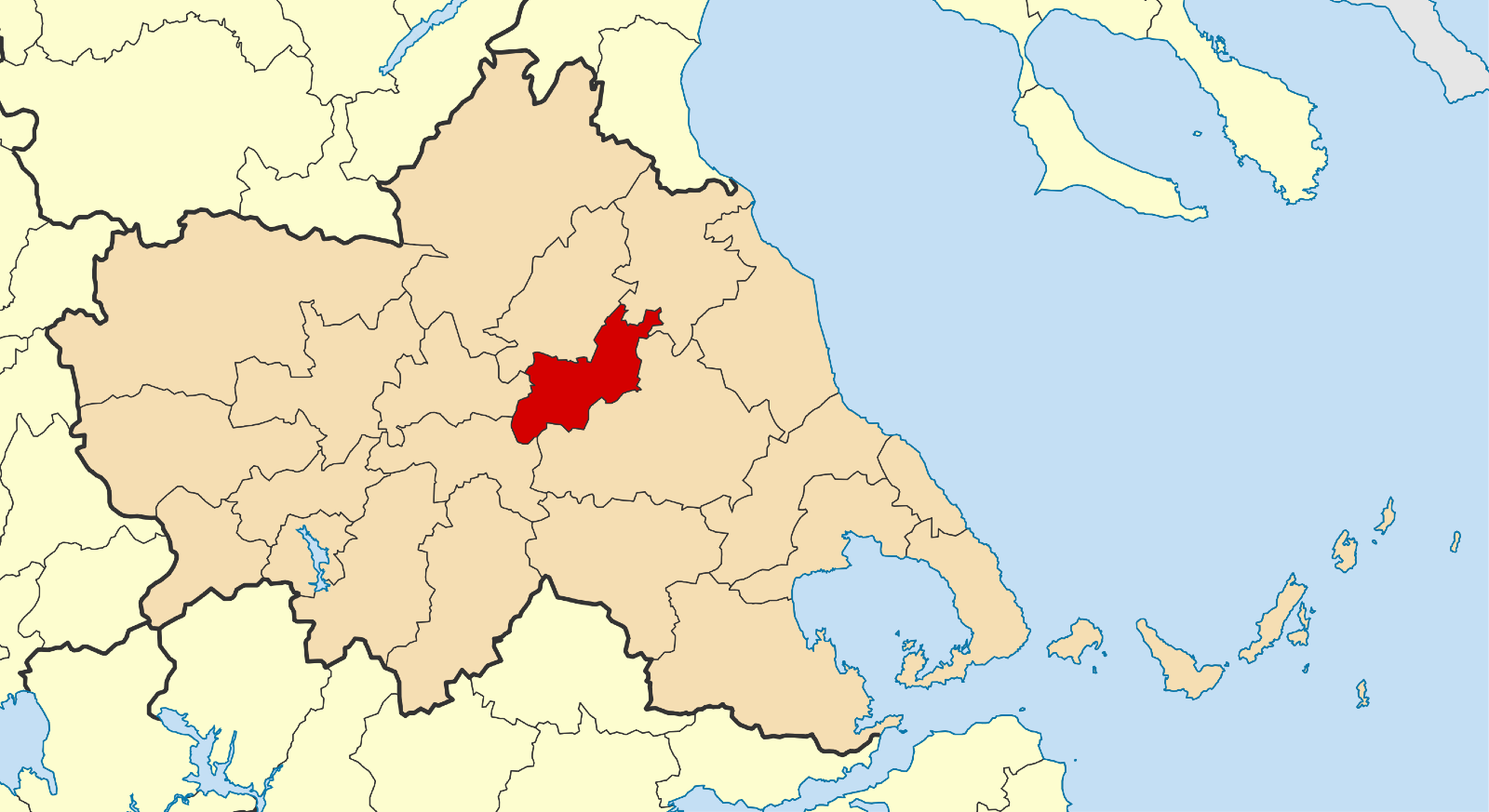

- Location within Greece
- Coordinates: 39°38.5′N 22°25′E
- Country: Greece
- Administrative region: Thessaly
- Regional unit: Larissa

Government
  - Mayor: Athanasios Mamakos (since 2023)

Area
  - Municipality: 335.98 km^{2} (129.72 sq mi)
  - Municipal unit: 122.59 km^{2} (47.33 sq mi)
- Elevation: 70 m (230 ft)

Population (2021)
  - Municipality: 164,095
  - Density: 488.41/km^{2} (1,265.0/sq mi)
  - Municipal unit: 148,562
  - Municipal unit density: 1,211.9/km^{2} (3,138.7/sq mi)
- Demonym: Larissean
- Time zone: UTC+2 (EET)
  - Summer (DST): UTC+3 (EEST)
- Postal code: 41x xx
- Area code: (+30)241
- Website: www.larissa-dimos.gr

Larissa (/ləˈrɪsə/; Greek: Λάρισα, Lárisa, pronounced [ˈlarisa]) is the capital and largest city of the Thessaly region in Greece. It is the fifth-most populous city in Greece with a population of 148,562 in the city proper, according to the 2021 census. It is also the capital of the Larissa regional unit. It is a principal agricultural centre and a national transport hub, linked by road and rail with the port of Volos and the cities of Thessaloniki and Athens. The municipality of Larissa has 164,095 inhabitants, while the regional unit of Larissa has a population of 268,963 (As of 2021).

Larissa was a city-state in Greek antiquity, the ruins of which are among its main tourist attractions. It is also home to a number of Roman, Byzantine and Ottoman buildings, reflecting its long history. Today, Larissa is an important commercial, transportation, educational, agricultural and industrial centre of Greece. The city straddles the Pineios river and north-northeast of the city are Mount Olympus and Mount Kissavos.

== Mythology ==
According to Greek mythology, it is said that the city was founded by Acrisius, who was killed accidentally by his grandson, Perseus. There lived Peleus, the hero beloved by the gods, and his son Achilles.

In mythology, the nymph Larissa was a daughter of the primordial man Pelasgus.

The city of Larissa is mentioned in Book II of the Iliad by Homer: "Hippothous led the tribes of Pelasgian spearsmen, who dwelt in fertile Larissa—Hippothous, and Pylaeus of the race of Mars, two sons of the Pelasgian Lethus, son of Teutamus." In this paragraph, Homer shows that the Pelasgians, Trojan allies, used to live in the city of Larissa. This city of Larissa was likely different from the city that was the birthplace of Achilles. The Larissa that features as a Trojan ally in the Iliad was likely to be located in the Troad, on the other side of the Aegean Sea.

== History ==
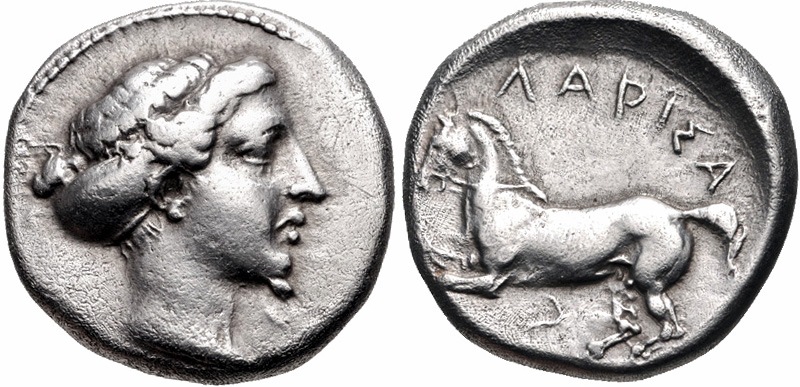
Silver drachma of Larissa (410-405 BC). Head of the nymph Larissa left, wearing pearl earring, her hair bound in sakkos / ΛΑΡΙΣΑ above, [IA] below (retrograde), bridled horse -symbol of the city- galloping right.

=== Pre-history ===
Traces of Paleolithic human settlement have been recovered from the area, but it was peripheral to areas of advanced culture. The area around Larissa was extremely fruitful; it was agriculturally important and in antiquity was known for its horses.

The name Larissa (Λάρισα Lárīsa) is in origin a Pelasgian word for "fortress". There were many ancient Greek cities with this name. The name of Thessalian Larissa is first recorded in connection with the aristocratic Aleuadai family. It was also a polis (city-state).

=== Classical Age ===
Larissa was a polis (city-state) during the Classical Era. Larissa is thought to be where the famous Greek physician Hippocrates and the famous philosopher Gorgias of Leontini died.

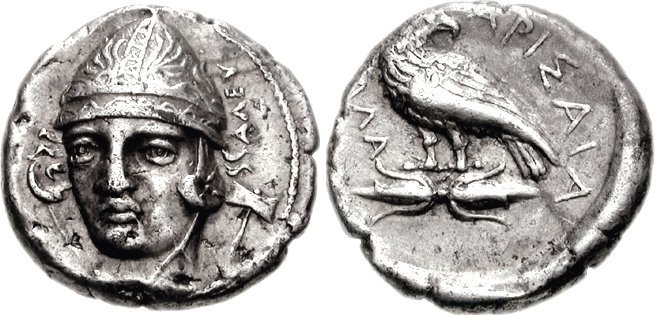
Coinage of Thessaly, possibly king Hellokrates, with portrait of Aleuas. Obv: head of Aleuas facing slightly left, wearing conical helmet, ALEU to right; labrys behind. Rev: Eagle standing right, head left, on thunderbolt; ELLA to left, LARISAYA to right. Thessaly, Larissa. c. 370–360 BC.

When Larissa ceased minting the federal coins it shared with other Thessalian towns and adopted its coinage in the late fifth century BC, it chose local types for its coins. The obverse depicted the nymph of the local spring, Larissa, for whom the town was named; probably the choice was inspired by the famous coins of Kimon depicting the Syracusan nymph Arethusa. The reverse depicted a horse in various poses. The horse was an appropriate symbol of Thessaly, a land of plains, which was well known for its horses. Usually, there is a male figure; he should perhaps be seen as the eponymous hero of the Thessalians, Thessalos, who is probably also to be identified on many of the earlier, federal coins of Thessaly.

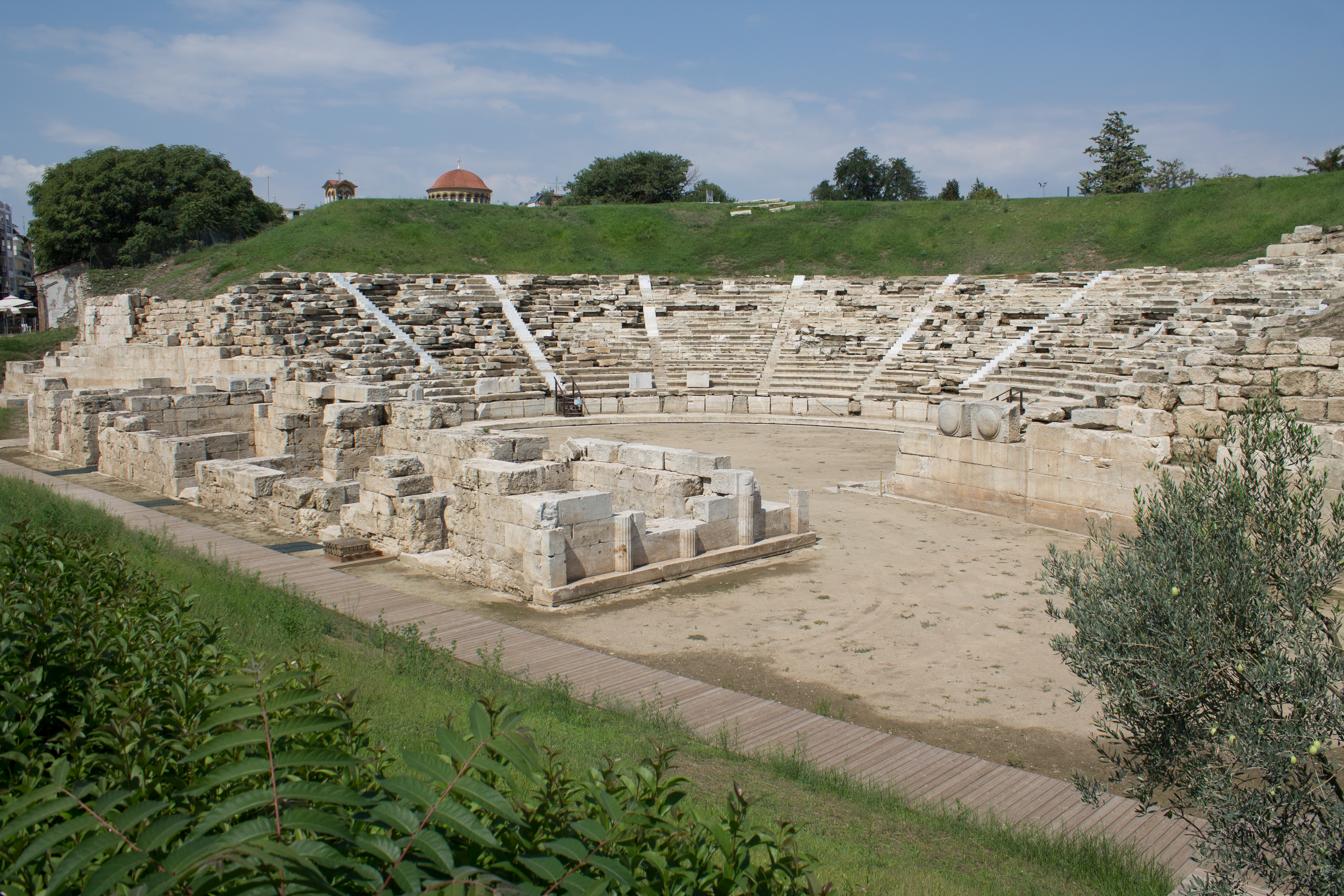
The first ancient theatre of the city. It was constructed inside the ancient city's centre during the reign of Antigonus II Gonatas towards the end of the third century BC. The theatre was in use for six centuries, until the end of the third century AD.

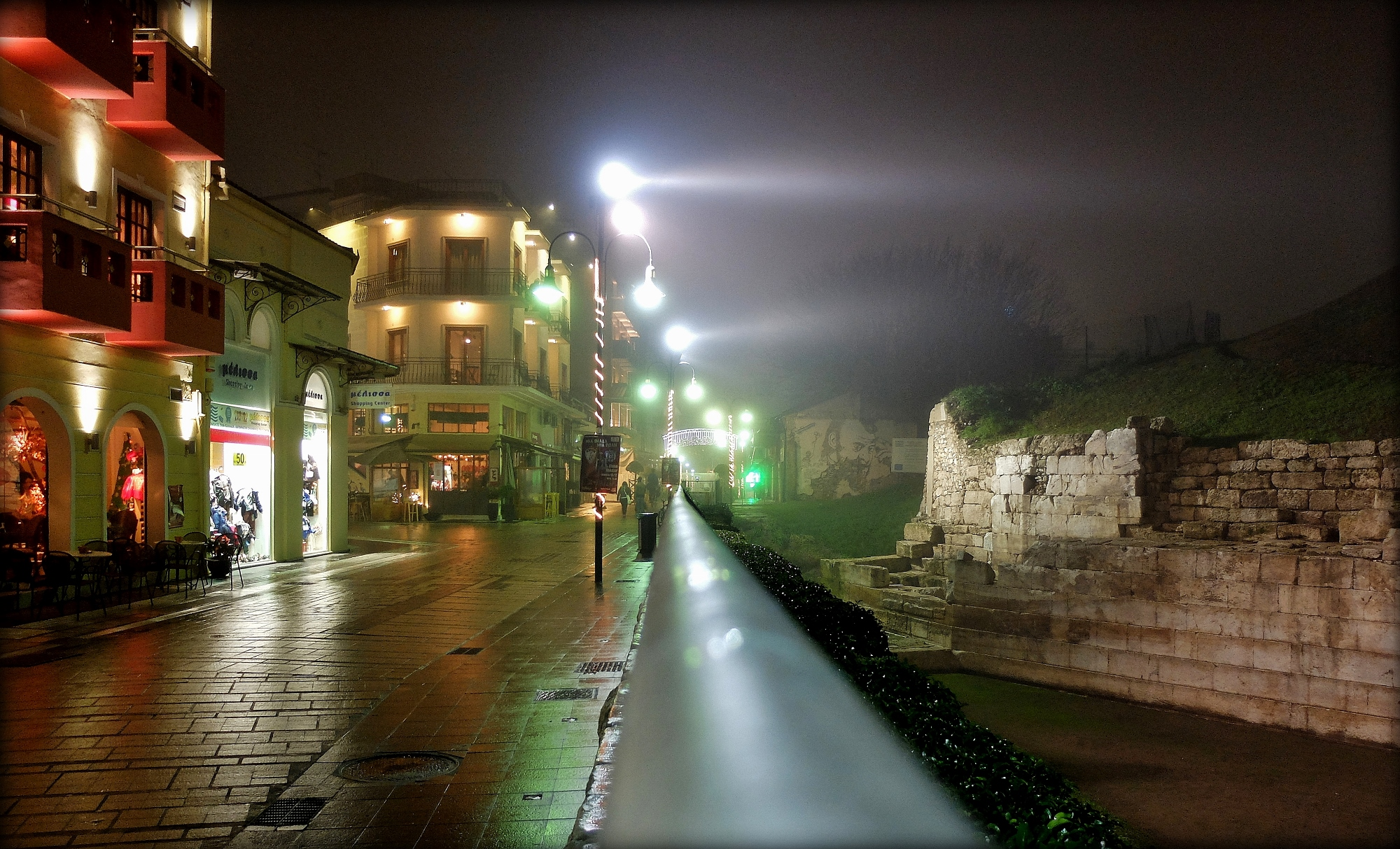
Pedestrian zone beside the First Ancient Greek theatre

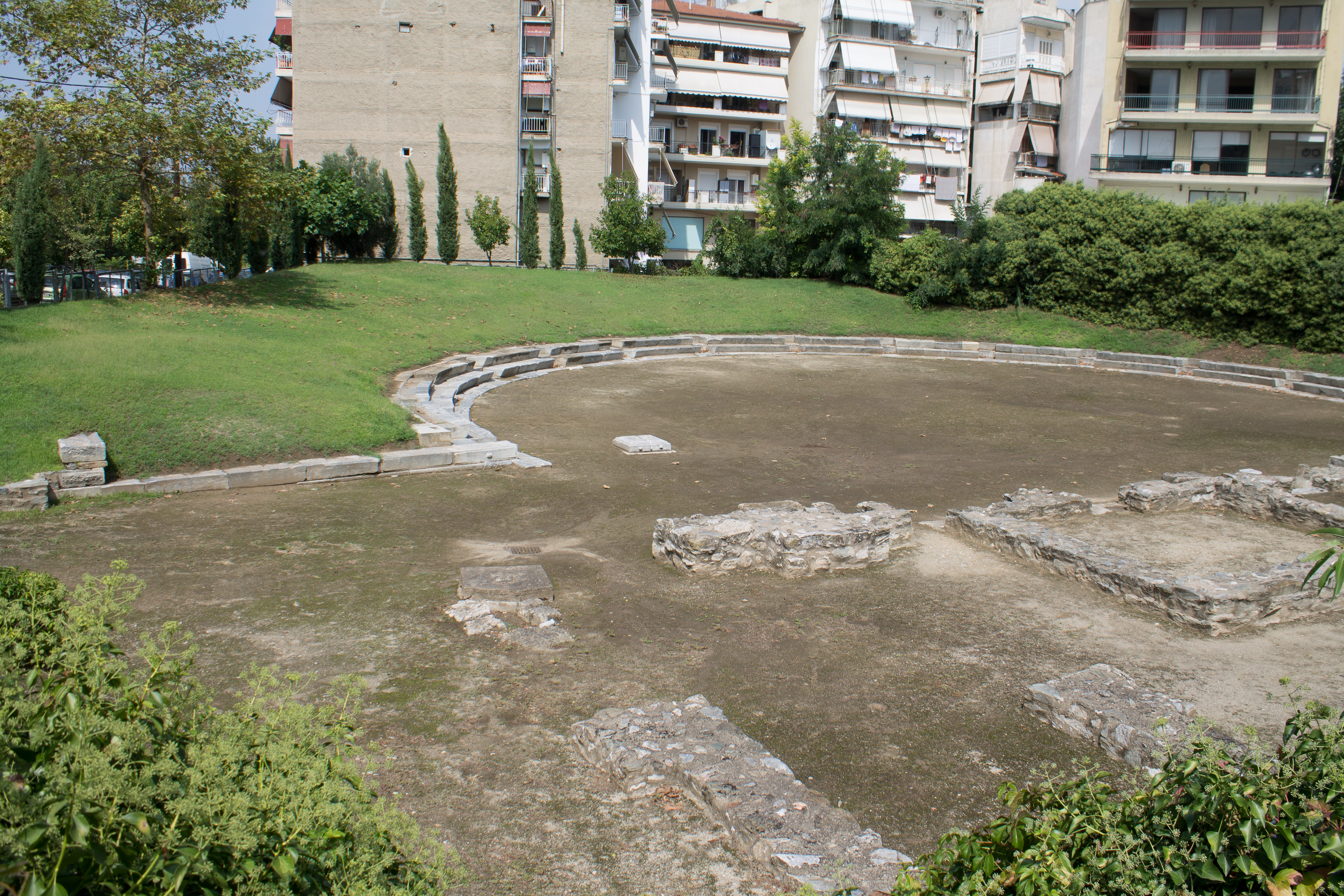
Ruins of the second ancient theatre

Larissa, sometimes written Larisa on ancient coins and inscriptions, is near the site of the Homeric Argissa. It appears in early times, when Thessaly was mainly governed by a few aristocratic families, as an important city under the rule of the Aleuadae, whose authority extended over the whole district of Pelasgiotis. This powerful family possessed for many generations before 369 BC the privilege of furnishing the Tagus, the local term for the strategos of the combined Thessalian forces. The principal rivals of the Aleuadae were the Scopadae of Crannon, the remains of which are about 14 miles southwest.

Larissa was the birthplace of Meno, who thus became, along with Xenophon and a few others, one of the generals leading several thousands of Greeks from various places, in the ill-fated expedition of 401 (retold in Xenophon's Anabasis) meant to help Cyrus the Younger, son of Darius II, king of Persia, overthrow his elder brother Artaxerxes II and take over the throne of Persia (Meno is featured in Plato's dialogue bearing his name, in which Socrates uses the example of "the way to Larissa" to help explain to Meno the difference between true opinion and science (Meno, 97a–c); this "way to Larissa" might well be on the part of Socrates an attempt to call to Meno's mind a "way home", understood as the way toward one's true and "eternal" home reached only at death, that each man is supposed to seek in his life).

The constitution of the town was democratic, which explains why it sided with Athens in the Peloponnesian War. A festival celebrated near Larissa resembled the Roman Saturnalia, and at which the slaves were waited on by their masters. As the chief city of ancient Thessaly, Larissa was taken by the Thebans and later directly annexed by Philip II of Macedon in 344. It remained under Macedonian control afterwards, except for a brief period when Demetrius Poliorcetes captured it in 302 BC.

It was in Larissa that Philip V of Macedon signed in 197 BC a treaty with the Romans after his defeat at the Battle of Cynoscephalae, and it was there also that Antiochus III the Great, won a great victory in 192 BC. In 196 BC Larissa became an ally of Rome and was the headquarters of the Thessalian League.

Larissa is frequently mentioned in connection with the Roman civil wars which preceded the establishment of the Roman Empire and Pompey sought refuge there after the defeat of Pharsalus.

=== Middle Ages ===
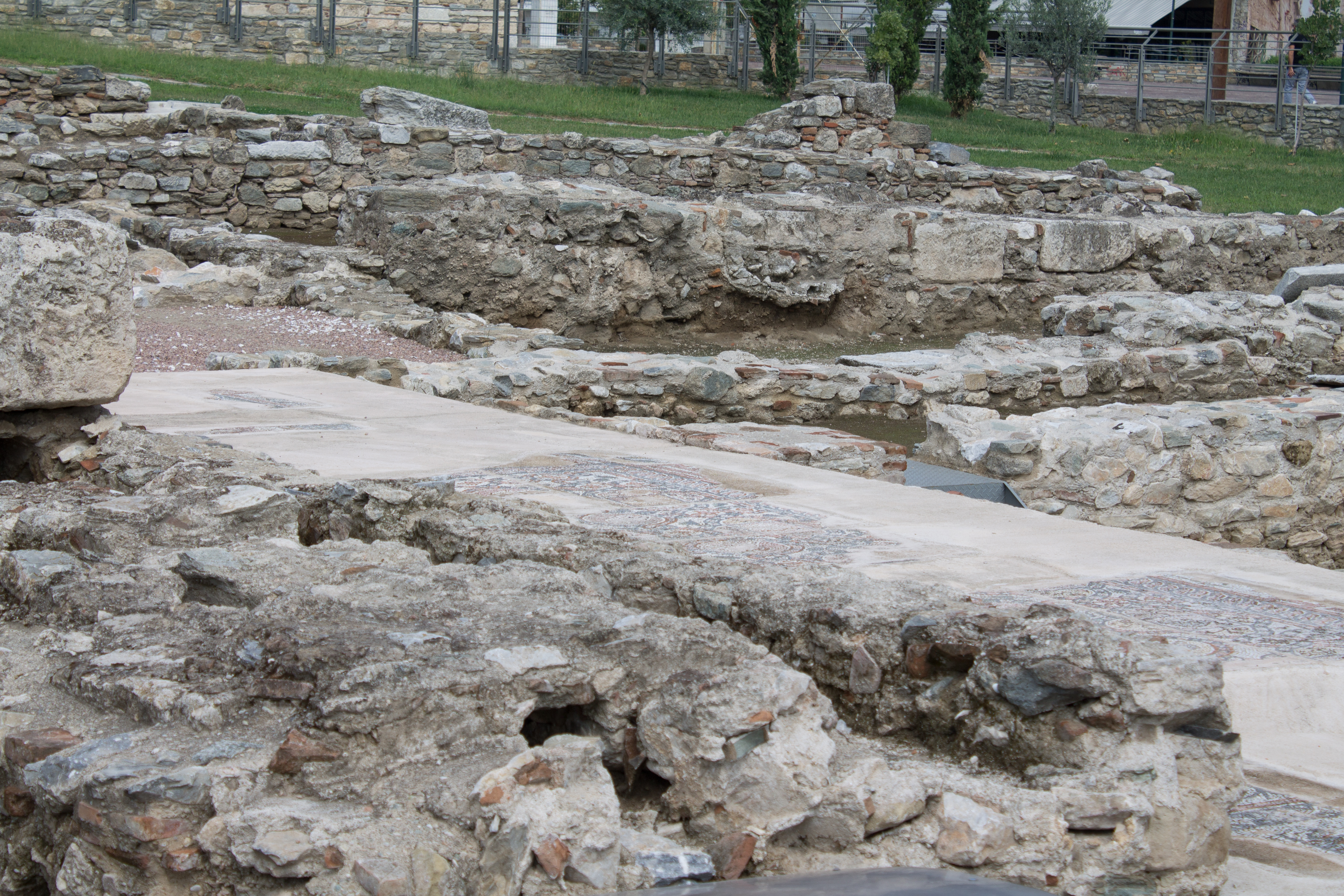
Remains of the Basilica of St. Achillios, destroyed during the Ottoman era

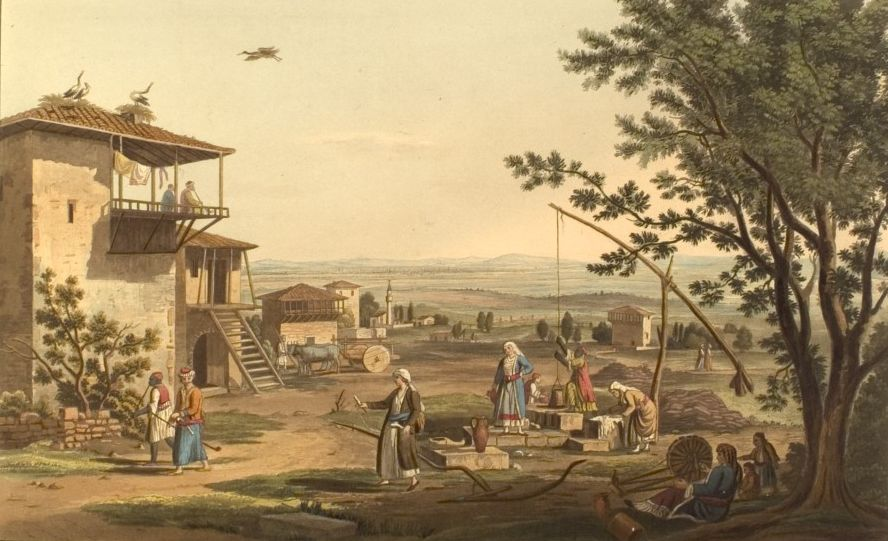
Gravure of Larissa, c. 1820

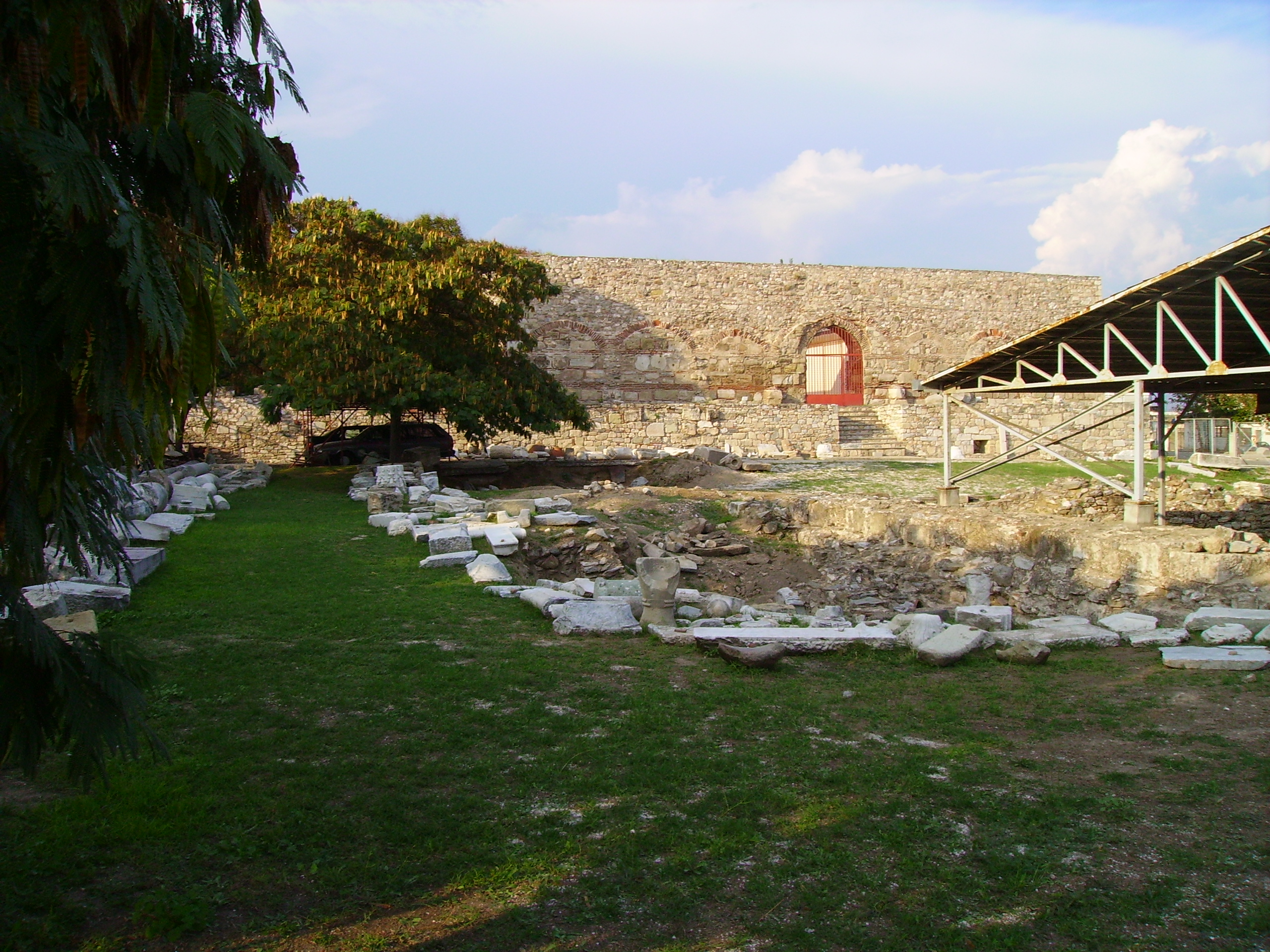
The archaeological excavations on Frourio Hill, with the Bezesten of Larissa in the background

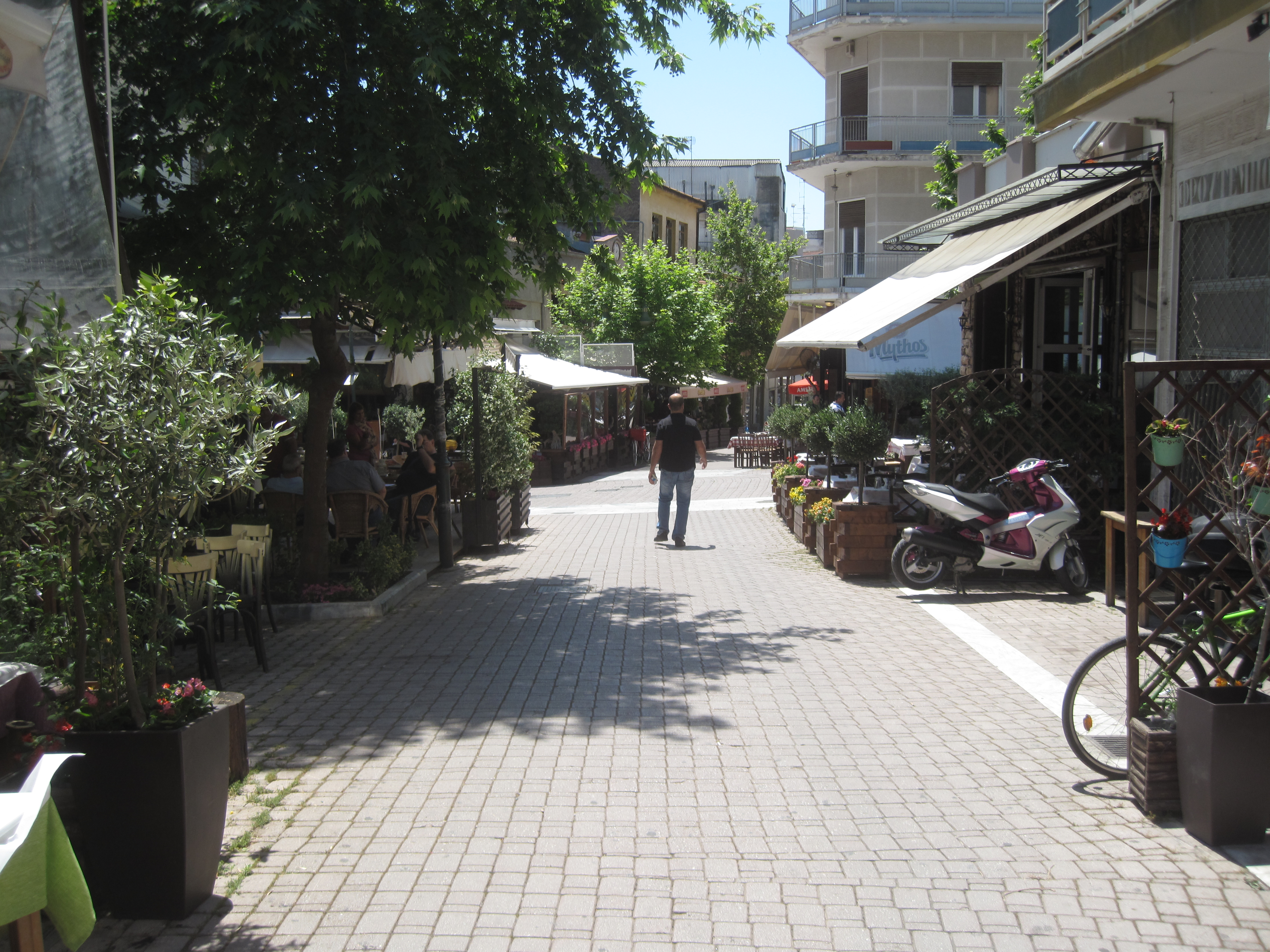
A street in the Frourio quarter

Larissa was sacked by the Ostrogoths in the late 5th century, and rebuilt under the Byzantine emperor Justinian I.

In the eighth century, the city became the metropolis of the theme of Hellas. The city was captured in 986 by Tsar Samuel of Bulgaria, who carried off the relics of its patron saint, Saint Achilleios, to Prespa. It was again unsuccessfully besieged by the Italo-Normans under Bohemond I in 1082/3.

After the Fourth Crusade, the King of Thessalonica, Boniface of Montferrat, gave the city to Lombard barons, but they launched a rebellion in 1209 that had to be subdued by the Latin Emperor Henry of Flanders himself. The city was recovered by Epirus soon after.

=== Ottoman period ===
Larissa was conquered by the Ottoman Empire in 1386/87 and again in the 1390s, but only came under permanent Ottoman control in 1423, by Turahan Bey. Under the Ottoman rule, the city was known as Yeni-şehir i-Fenari, "new citadel". As the chief town and military base of Ottoman Thessaly, Larissa was a predominantly Muslim city. In 1521 (Hijri 927) the town had 693 Muslim and 75 Christian households; according to Gökbilgin (1956), it also included Albanian and Jewish communities. During Ottoman rule the administration of the Metropolis of Larissa was transferred to nearby Trikala where it remained until 1734, when Metropolitan Iakovos II returned the see from Trikala to Larissa and established the present-day metropolis of Larissa and Tyrnavos.

The town was noted for its trade fair in the 17th and 18th centuries, while the seat of the pasha of Thessaly was also transferred there in 1770. Larissa was the headquarters of Hursid Pasha during the Greek War of Independence. It was also renowned for its mosques, medrese, and bedestens. However, many of these buildings were destroyed in a fire in 1882 and others were demolished. Larissa had twenty-seven or twenty-eight mosques in 1880, while at the beginning of twentieth century, probably only nine were still standing. Eight were likely demolished in the twentieth century leaving only the Yeni Mosque.

The city remained a part of the Ottoman Empire until Thessaly became part of the independent Kingdom of Greece in 1881, except for a period when Ottoman forces re-occupied it during the Greco-Turkish War of 1897. In the late 19th century, there was still a small village on the outskirts of the town inhabited by Africans from Sudan, a curious remnant of the forces collected by Ali Pasha.

In the 19th century, the town produced leather, cotton, silk and tobacco. Fevers and agues were prevalent owing to bad drainage and the overflowing of the river; and the death rate was higher than the birth rate.

=== Modern Greek era ===
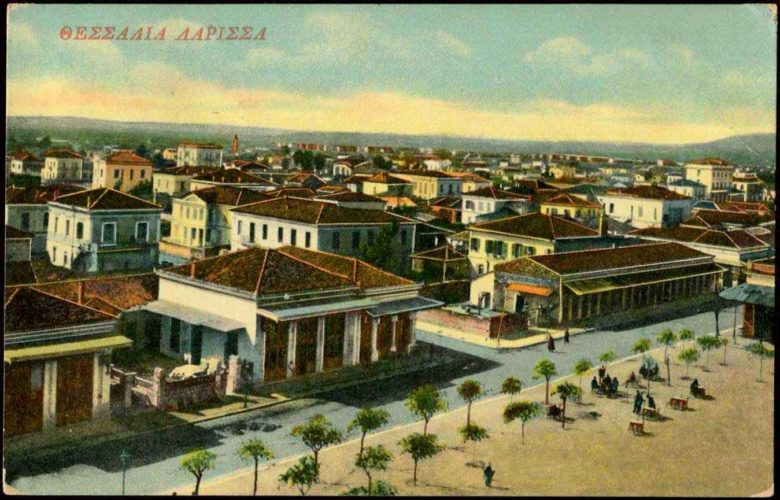
Old postcard of the city, Alexandras Street, 1910

In 1881, the city, along with the rest of Thessaly, was incorporated into the Kingdom of Greece during the prime ministry of Alexandros Koumoundouros. On 31 August 1881, a unit of the Greek Army headed by General Skarlatos Soutsos entered the city. A considerable portion of the Turkish population emigrated to the Ottoman Empire at that point. In this new era, the city starts gradually to expand and to be rebuilt by the Greek authorities.

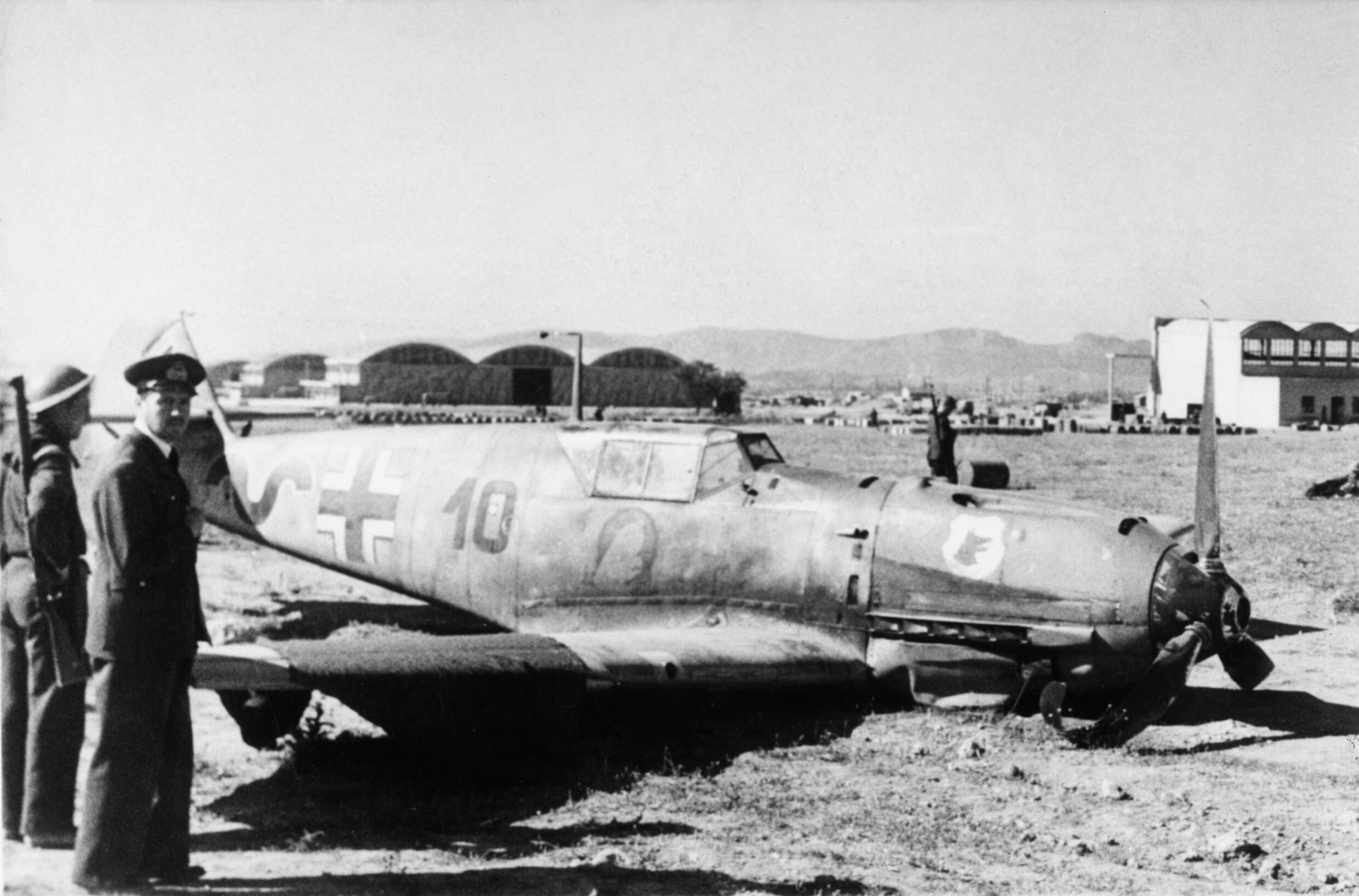
A German Messerschmitt which was crash-landed on the military airfield at Larissa, shot down by RAF pilots during WWII

During the Greco-Turkish War of 1897, the city was the headquarters of Greek Crown Prince Constantine. The flight of the Greek army from here to Farsala took place on 23 April 1897. Turkish troops entered the city two days later. After a treaty for peace was signed, they withdrew and Larissa remained permanently in Greece. This was followed by a further exodus of Turks in 1898. The Hassan Bey mosque (which was built in the early 16th century) was demolished in 1908.

During the Axis Occupation of the country, the Jewish community of the city (dated back to the 2nd century BC, see Romaniotes) suffered heavy losses. Today in the city there is a Holocaust memorial and a synagogue.

=== After WWII ===
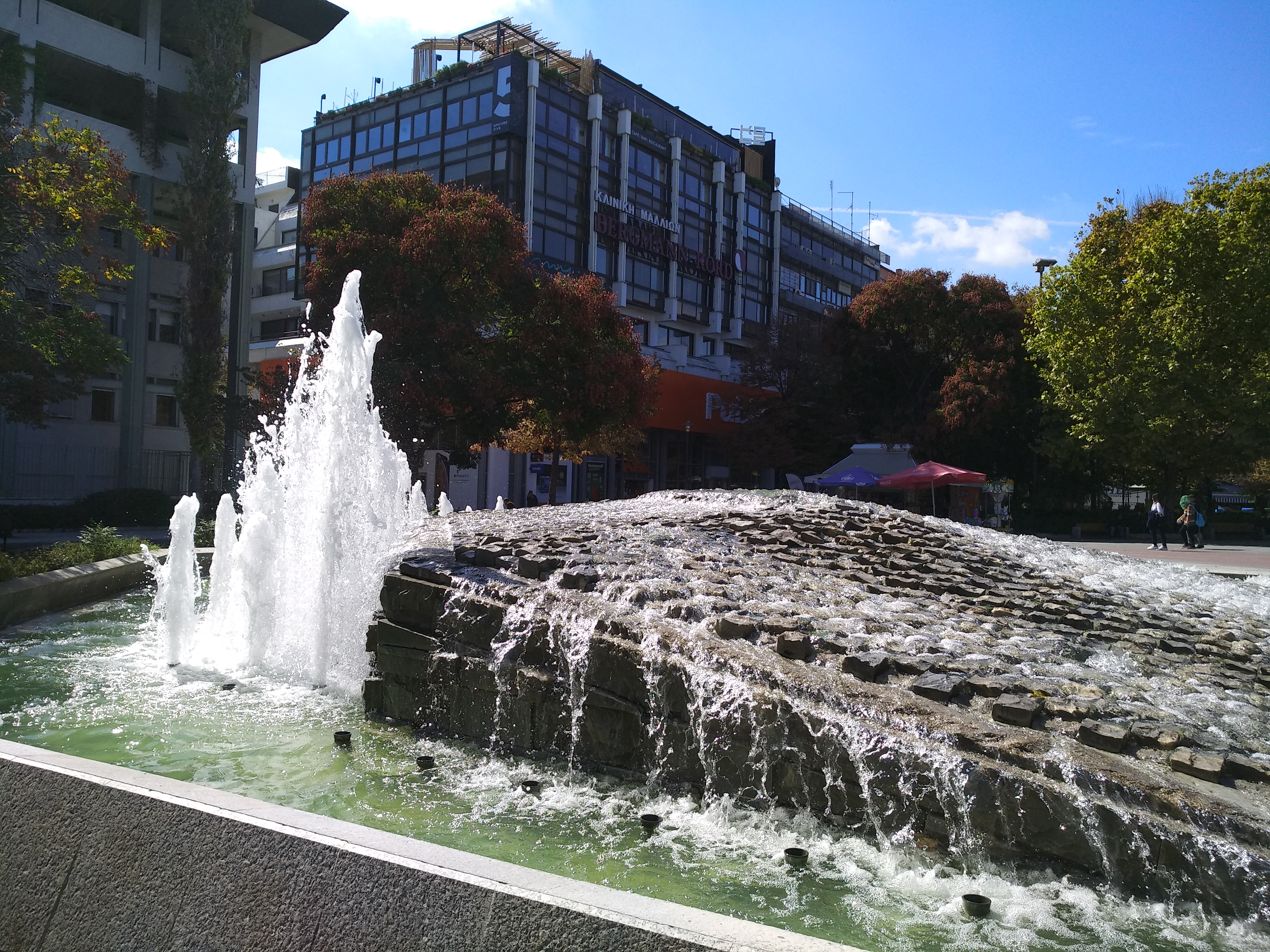
The "floating river" fountain in Central Square of Larissa (Sapka, former Themidos) by Nella Golanda

After WWII the city was expanded rapidly. Today Larissa is the fourth largest Greek city with many squares, taverns and cafes. It has three public hospitals with one being a military hospital. It hosts the Hellenic Air Force Headquarters and NATO Headquarters in Greece. It has a School of Medicine and a School of Biochemistry – Biotechnology and the third largest in the country Institute of Technology. It occupies the first place among Greek cities in green coverage rate per square-metre urban space and the first place with the highest percentage of bars-taverns-restaurants per capita in Greece. It also has two public libraries and five museums.

The re-design of the whole town centre after the uncovering of the ancient theatre is by Nella Golanda, who had a personal interest in the city as her mother was from Larissa.

== Ecclesiastical history ==
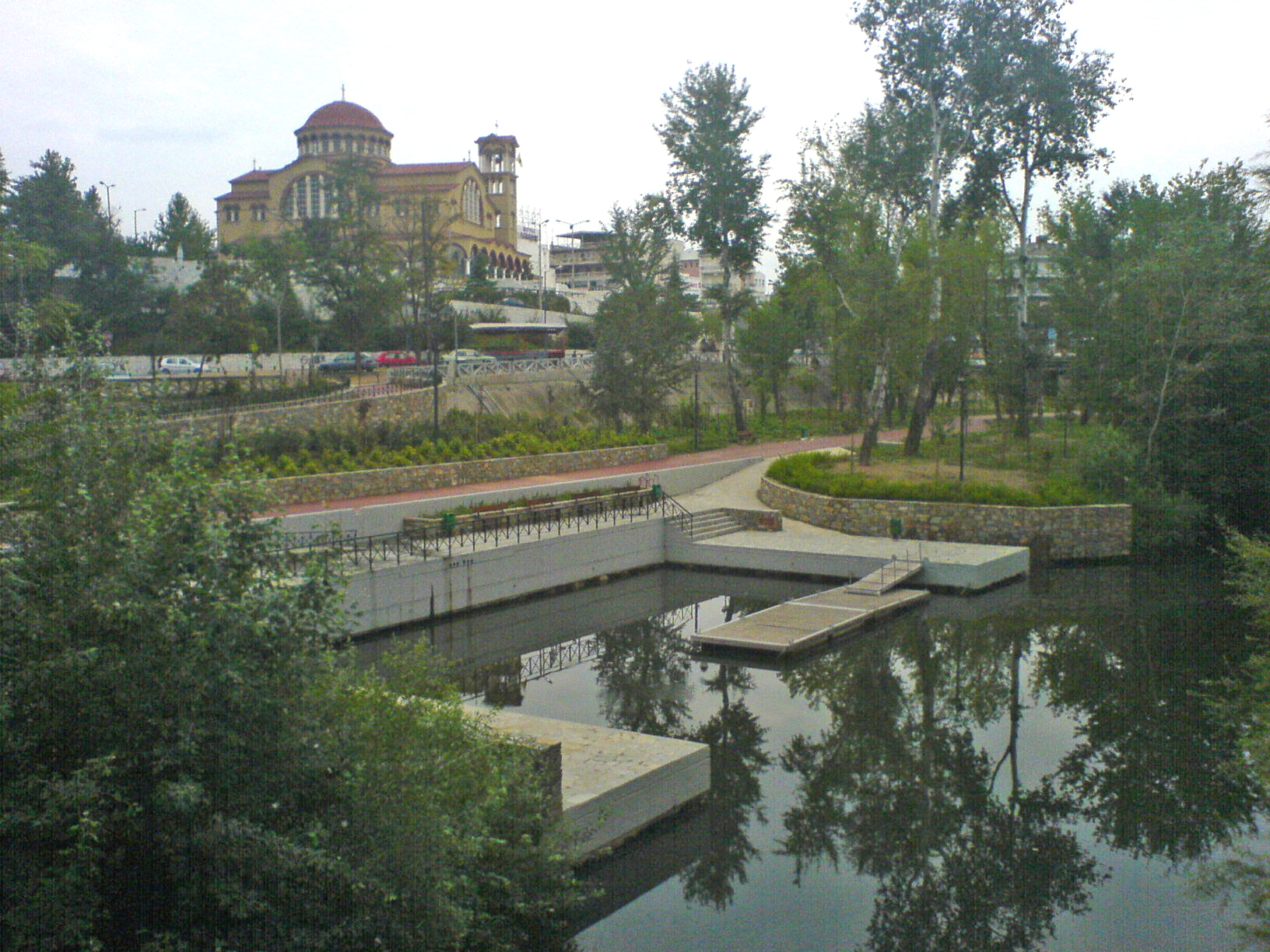
Pineios river with the church of St. Achillios in the background, patron saint of the city

Christianity penetrated early to Larissa, though its first bishop was recorded only in 325, at the Council of Nicaea. St. Achillius of the fourth century is celebrated for his miracles. Le Quien cites twenty-nine bishops from the fourth to the 18th centuries; the most famous is Jeremias II, who occupied the see until 733 when Emperor Leo III the Isaurian transferred it from the jurisdiction of the Pope of Rome to the Patriarchate of Constantinople. In the first years of the tenth century it had ten suffragan sees; subsequently the number increased, and in c. 1175, under Emperor Manuel I Comnenus, it reached twenty-eight. At the close of the 15th century, under Ottoman domination, there were only ten suffragan sees, which gradually grew less and finally disappeared.

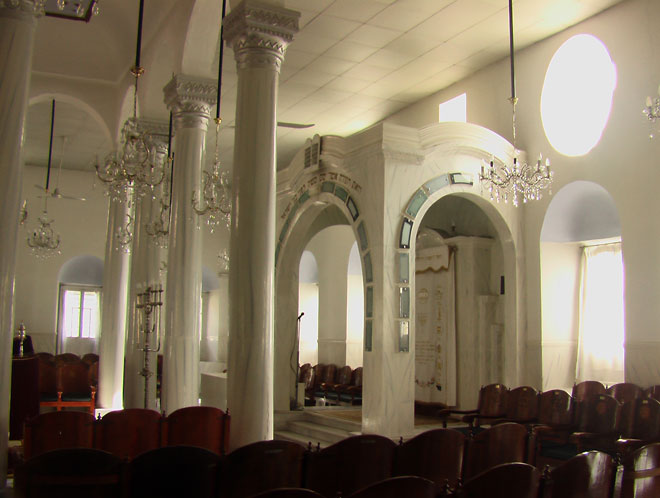
Interior of the Jewish synagogue of Larissa

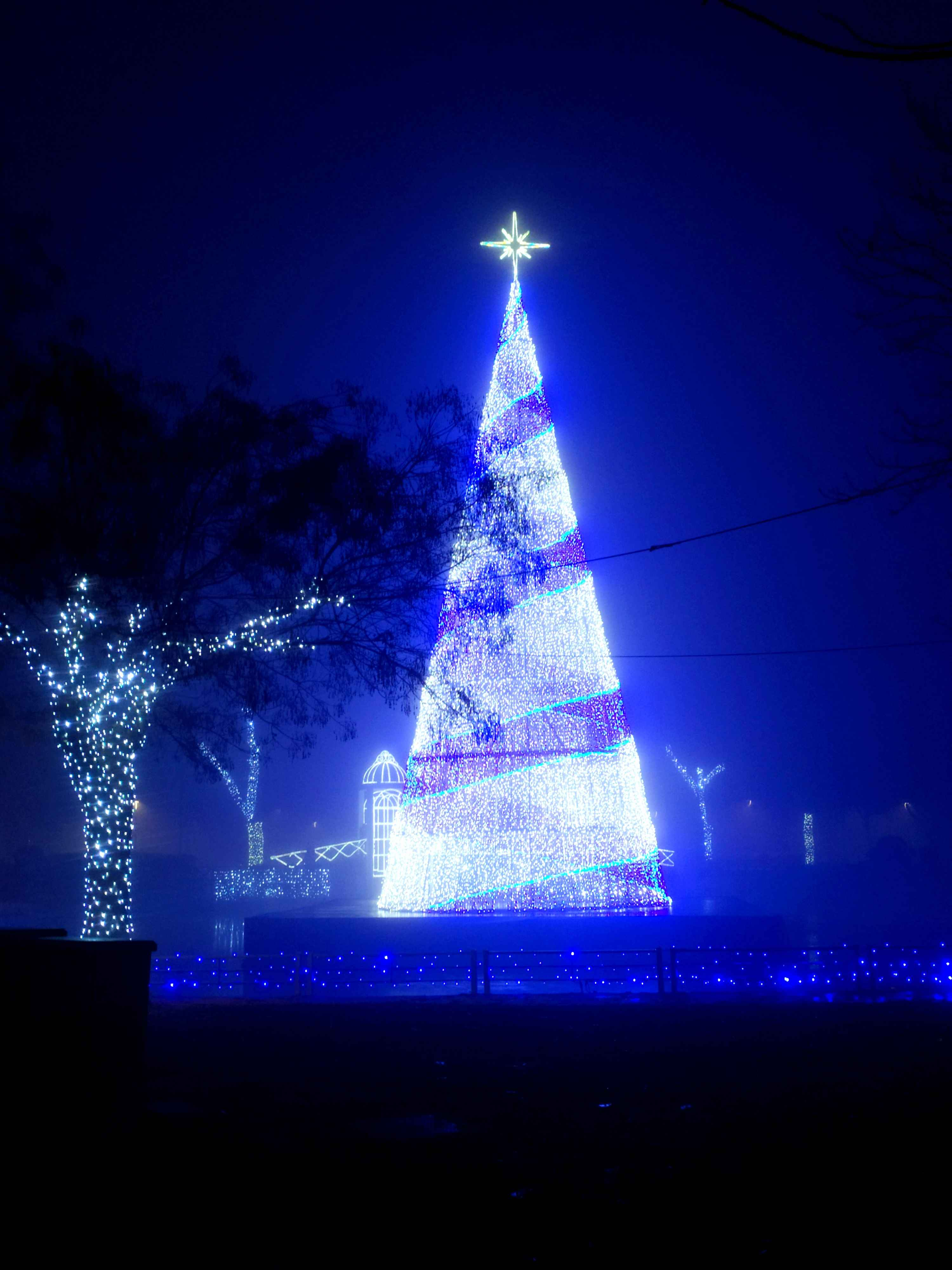
Public Christmas tree near St. Achillios

Larissa is an Orthodox Metropolis of the Church of Greece.

It was also briefly a Latin archbishopric in the early 13th century, and remains a Latin Metropolitan (top-ranking) titular see of the Roman Catholic Church, which must not be confused with the Latin episcopal (low-ranking) titular see Larissa in Syria. Today there is a Catholic church in the city (Sacred Heart of Jesus).

== Sights ==
In the area from the Frourio hill to the Central square is located the old part of the city where some of its main landmarks are. Sights of the city are:

- The Frourio Hill and the adjacent First Ancient Greek Theatre area
- The Pineios river that crosses the city center near the St. Achillios church and the Alkazar Park next to the lush river banks of Pineios river
- The First Ancient Greek Theatre of Larissa, built in the 3rd century BC
- The Second Ancient Theatre, built in the 1st century BC
- Votive stele of Poseidon, an early 4th-century BC stele dedicated to Poseidon by the Thessalians. A replica stands at the original site, while the original is in a museum.
- The Basilica of St. Achillios, early Byzantine basilica ruins dedicated to the city's patron saint
- The church of St. Achillios Cathedral
- The Cenotaph monument of Hippocrates, the 4th-century BC votive stele dedicated to Poseidon
- The Bezesten of Larissa, built in the 15th century, was an Ottoman enclosed market and also used in the 19th century as a gunpowder magazine and fort.
- The Yeni Mosque, a rare example of a 19th-century mosque built in neoclassical style, now used as a museum
- The Ottoman Baths, probably built in the 15th century
- The Diachronic Museum of Larissa with finds that cover all history of Larissa since antiquity
- Historical buildings that have been listed as architecturally preserved, such as the Mill of Pappas, the Cine Palace (architect Colonello), the Charokopos Tower (arch. Anastasios Metaxas, built in 1902, endangered to collapse as of 2022) and the neoclassical complex of the Averofeios Agricultural School (built in 1908)

== Geography ==
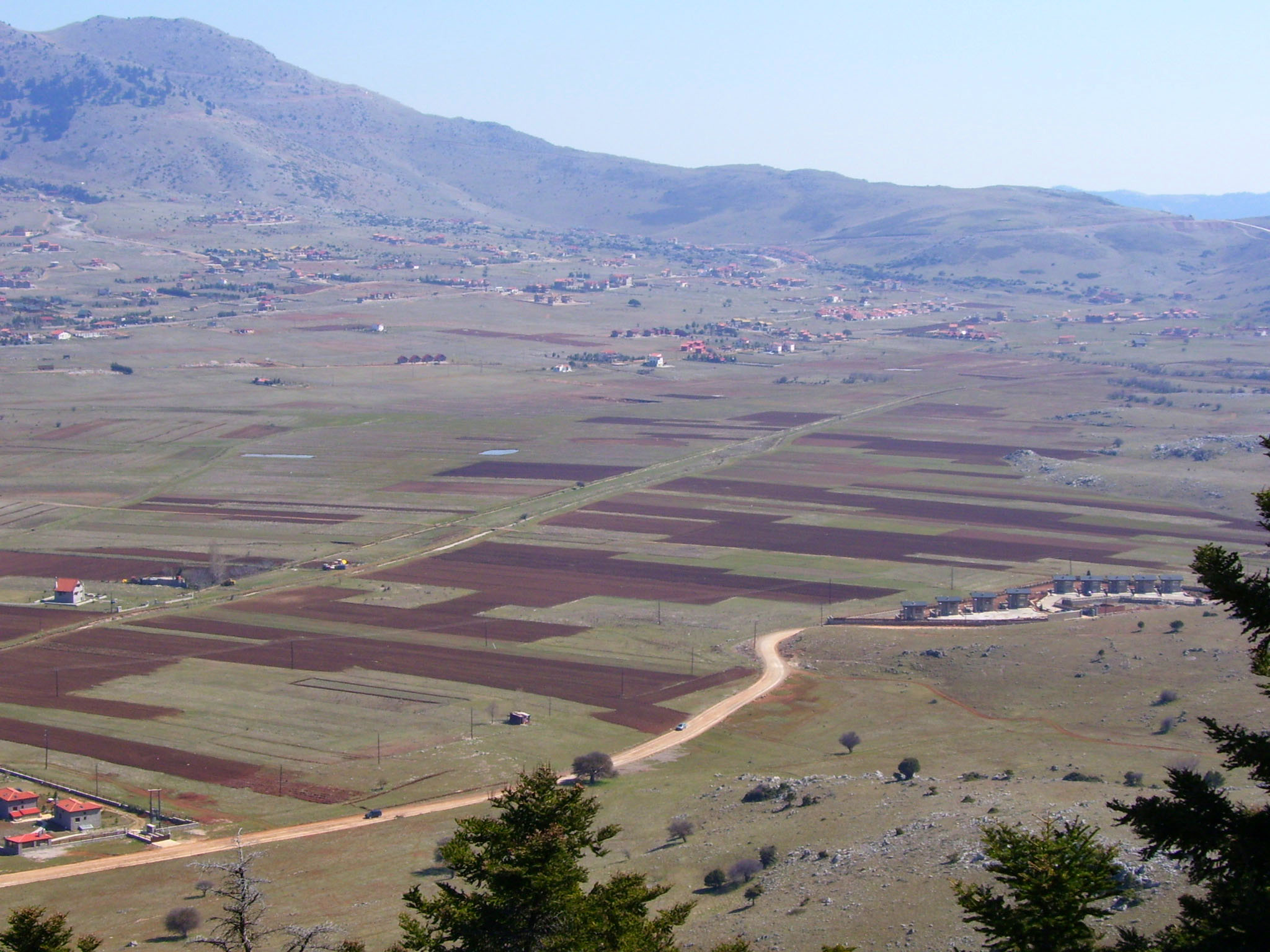
Plain of Larissa

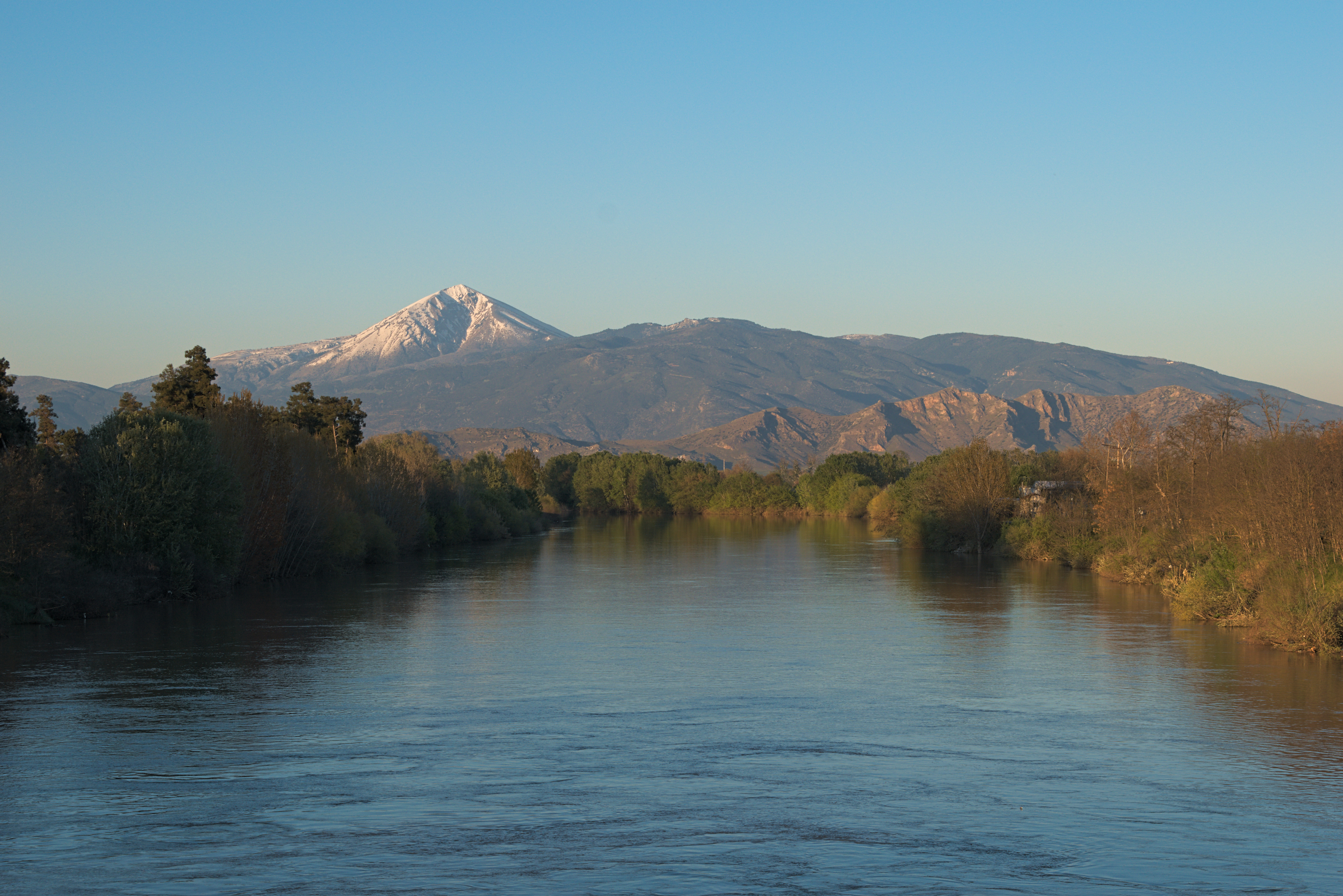
Mount Kissavos viewed from Pineios bridge in Larissa

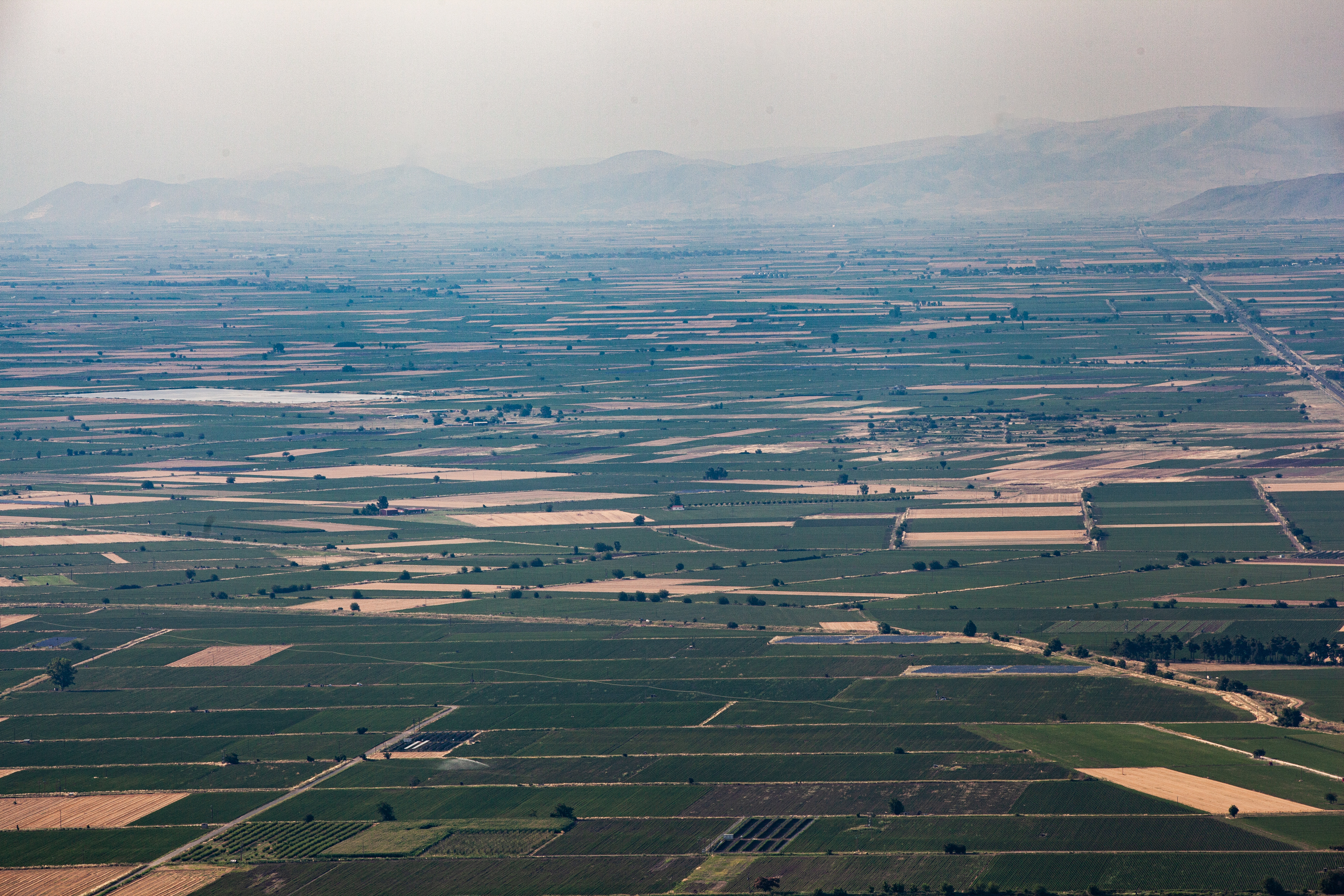
View of the plains of Larissa from the heights of Domokos

Larissa is around 120 kilometres (75 mi) south-west of Thessaloniki and around 210 kilometres (130 mi) north-west of Athens.

There are a number of highways, including E75, E65, and the main railway from Athens to Thessaloniki (Salonika) crossing through Thessaly. The region is directly linked to the rest of Europe through the International Airport of Central Greece located in Nea Anchialos a short distance from Larissa (about 60 km [37 mi]). Larissa lies on the river Pineios.

The municipality of Larissa has an area of 335.98 km^{2} (129.72 sq mi), the municipal unit Larissa has an area of 122.586 km^{2} (47.331 sq mi), and the community Larissa has an area of 88.167 km^{2} (34.041 sq mi).

The city is in close proximity of destinations such as Mount Olympus, Mount Kissavos, Meteora, Lake Plastira, Pilio, etc.

The Larissa Chasma, a deep gash in the surface of Dione, a natural satellite of Saturn, was named after Larissa.

=== Climate ===
The climate of Larissa is cold semi-arid (Köppen: BSk) with some Mediterranean climate (Csa) characteristics such as the drier summers and the somewhat wetter winters. The winter is cold, and some snowfalls may occur, though few of them are heavy. The summer is particularly hot, and temperatures near or above 40 °C (104 °F) typically occur every year for a few days. Thunderstorms during the summer months are sometimes heavy and may cause agricultural damage. Larissa receives about 413 mm (16 in) of rain per year and has an average annual average temperature of 15.4 °C (59.7 °F).

Climate data for Larissa (1991–2020, extremes 1955–present)
Month	Jan	Feb	Mar	Apr	May	Jun	Jul	Aug	Sep	Oct	Nov	Dec	Year
Record high °C (°F)	22.8 (73.0)	25.2 (77.4)	34.8 (94.6)	33.8 (92.8)	40.0 (104.0)	44.8 (112.6)	45.5 (113.9)	45.2 (113.4)	41.9 (107.4)	36.8 (98.2)	29.6 (85.3)	23.4 (74.1)	45.5 (113.9)
Mean daily maximum °C (°F)	10.2 (50.4)	12.2 (54.0)	16.0 (60.8)	21.0 (69.8)	26.8 (80.2)	32.2 (90.0)	34.4 (93.9)	34.0 (93.2)	29.2 (84.6)	22.4 (72.3)	15.6 (60.1)	11.2 (52.2)	22.1 (71.8)
Daily mean °C (°F)	5.4 (41.7)	6.8 (44.2)	10.0 (50.0)	14.4 (57.9)	19.8 (67.6)	25.0 (77.0)	27.4 (81.3)	27.0 (80.6)	22.2 (72.0)	16.4 (61.5)	10.6 (51.1)	6.6 (43.9)	16.0 (60.7)
Mean daily minimum °C (°F)	0.6 (33.1)	1.4 (34.5)	4.0 (39.2)	7.8 (46.0)	12.8 (55.0)	17.8 (64.0)	20.4 (68.7)	20.0 (68.0)	15.2 (59.4)	10.4 (50.7)	5.6 (42.1)	2.0 (35.6)	9.8 (49.7)
Record low °C (°F)	−21.6 (−6.9)	−14.4 (6.1)	−10.2 (13.6)	−4.0 (24.8)	1.2 (34.2)	6.4 (43.5)	9.8 (49.6)	8.6 (47.5)	3.2 (37.8)	−2.4 (27.7)	−8.0 (17.6)	−20.4 (−4.7)	−21.6 (−6.9)
Average precipitation mm (inches)	45.2 (1.78)	41.0 (1.61)	41.5 (1.63)	35.6 (1.40)	40.2 (1.58)	26.4 (1.04)	22.0 (0.87)	21.0 (0.83)	32.4 (1.28)	54.0 (2.13)	58.2 (2.29)	64.5 (2.54)	482 (18.98)
Average precipitation days	8.5	8.0	8.2	7.4	6.8	4.2	3.5	3.8	4.5	7.2	8.6	10.4	81.1
Average relative humidity (%)	80	75	71	65	59	50	46	49	56	68	79	82	65
Mean monthly sunshine hours	105.4	117.6	158.1	204.0	257.3	315.0	334.8	316.2	246.0	167.4	108.0	97.2	2,467
Source 1: Hellenic National Meteorological Service
Source 2: NOAA (extremes, sun 1961–1990), Info Climat (extremes 1991-present)

== Administration ==
The municipality Larissa was formed at the 2011 local government reform by the merger of the following 3 former municipalities, that became municipal units:

- Giannouli
- Koilada
- Larissa

=== Districts ===
The municipal unit of Larissa is divided into four city-districts or municipal communities (29 city areas) plus 2 suburban communities (Amphithea and Koulourion). The municipality includes also the Community of Terpsithèa (with the suburban community of Argyssa).

1st Municipal District (pop. 26,035)

1. Papastàvrou
2. Saint Athanàsios
3. Alkazàr
4. Hippocrates-Pèra
5. Potamòpolis
6. Philippòpolis
7. Livadàki
8. Saint Thomas
9. Saint Paraskevi-Mezourlo
10. Neàpolis

2nd Municipal District (pop. 41,816)

1. Saint Achellios
2. Saint Nikòlaos
3. Ambelòkipoi
4. Saints Sarànta
5. Saint Konstantinos
6. Stathmòs

3rd Municipal District (pop. 30,121)

1. Lachanòkipoi
2. Nèa Smyrne-Kamynia
3. Kalyvia-Saint Marina
4. Saint Geòrgios
5. Anatoli
6. Koulouri
7. Amphithèa

4th Municipal District (pop. 26,814)

1. Charavgi-Toumba-OKE
2. Pyrovolikà-Pharos
3. Avèrof-Sèkfo
4. Nèa Politia
5. Epiròtika
6. Anthoupolis
7. Neràida
8. Kàmpos

Community of Terpsithèa (pop. 1,290)

1. Terpsithèa
2. Argyssa

From 1 January 2011, in accordance with the Kallikratis Plan (new administrative division of Greece), the new municipality of Larissa includes also the former municipalities of Giannouli and Koilada.

=== Province ===
The province of Larissa (Greek: Επαρχία Λάρισας) was one of the provinces of the Larissa Prefecture. Its territory corresponded with that of the current municipalities Larissa (except the municipal unit Giannouli) and Tempi (except the municipal units Gonnoi and Kato Olympos). It was abolished in 2006.

=== Main streets ===
- Anthimou Gazi
- Kouma
- Roosevelt
- 31 August
- Karamanli Avenue
- Koumoundourou
- Mandilara
- Rizopoulou
- Papanastasiou
- Venizelou (former Makedonias)
- Kiprou (Alexandras)
- Polykarpou
- Asclepiou
- Iroon Polytechniou Avenue
- Lambraki
- Thetidos
- Korai
- Ipsilantou
- Tsimiski
- Sklirou
- Panagouli
- Ioanninon
- Kolokotroni
- Manolaki
- Nikitara
- Volou Avenue

=== List of mayors ===
The mayors of Larissa from 1881 to 2023 were as follows:

- Hasan Etem Aga (1881–1882)
- Argyrios Didikas
- Christos Georgiadis
- Dionysios Galatis
- Achilleas Asteriadis
- Achilleas Logiotatou
- Konstantinos Anastasiadis
- Konstantinos Markidis
- Vasileios Sylivridis
- Anastasios Zarmanis
- Michail Sapkas (1914–1917, 1925–1934)
- Konstantinos Vlachos
- Christos Koutsoubas
- Dimitris Papageorgiou
- Vasileios Arsenidis
- Stylianos Asteriadis
- Nikolaos Tzavellas
- Dimitrios Karathanos
- Sotirios Zazias
- Dimitrios Hatzigiannis
- Athanasios Messinis
- Stylianos Zografidis
- Agamemnon Blanas (1975–1978)
- Alexandros Chondronasios (1978–1980)
- Aristeides Labroulis (1980–1994)
- Christodoulos Kafes (1994–1998)
- Konstantinos Tzanakoulis (1998–2014)
- Apostolos Kalogiannis (2014–2023)
- Athanasios Mamakos (2024–present)

== Economy ==
Larissa is a major agricultural center of Greece, due to the plain of Thessaly.

In manufacturing sector, Larissa is among others home to Biokarpet carpet company (whose owners were also major shareholders of AEL FC in the past) and Orient Bikes.

It comes also in first place with the highest percentage of bars-taverns-restaurants per capita in Greece. Mikel Coffee Company and Bruno Coffee Stores chains started and have also their base in the city.

== Culture ==
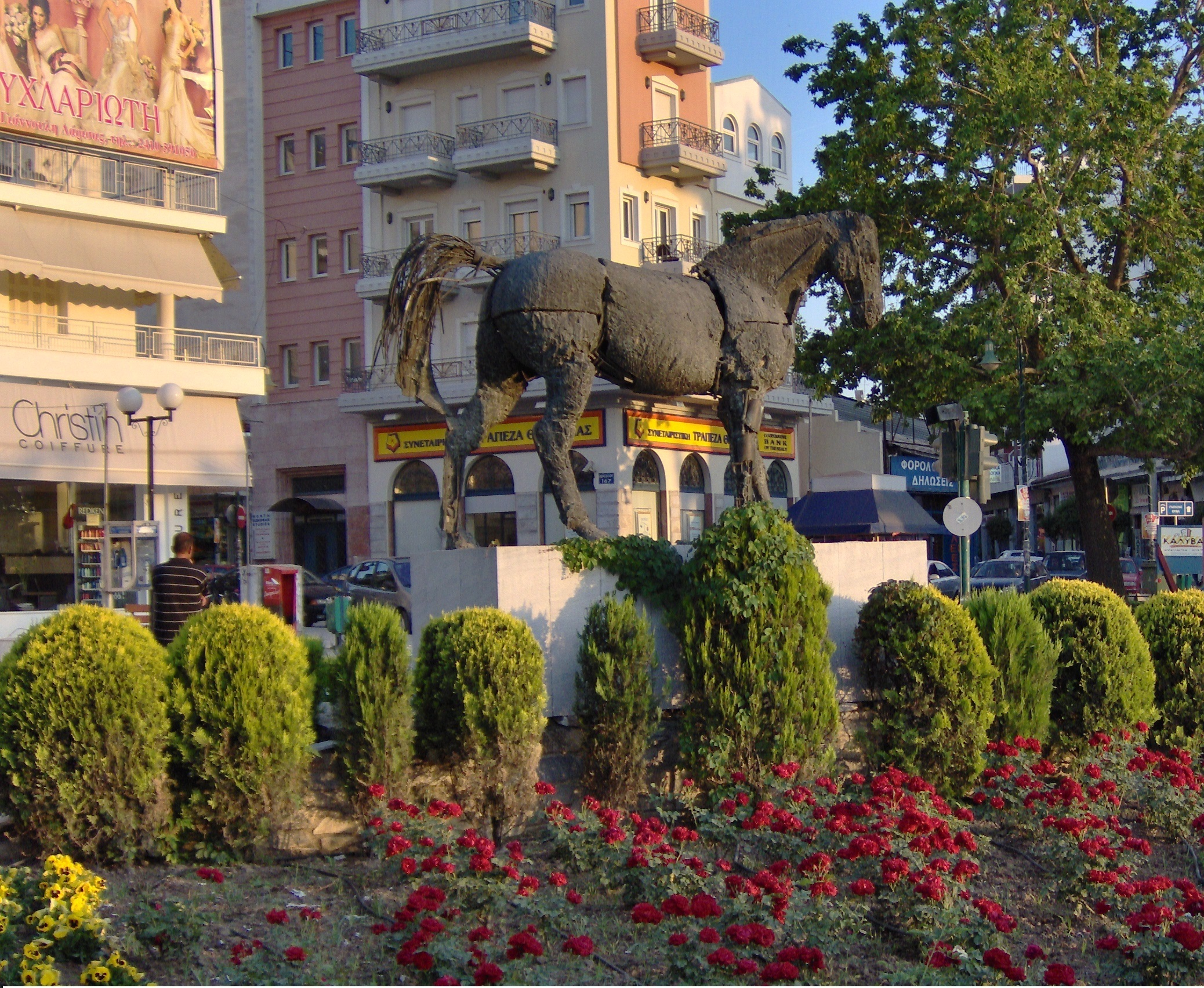
A horse statue

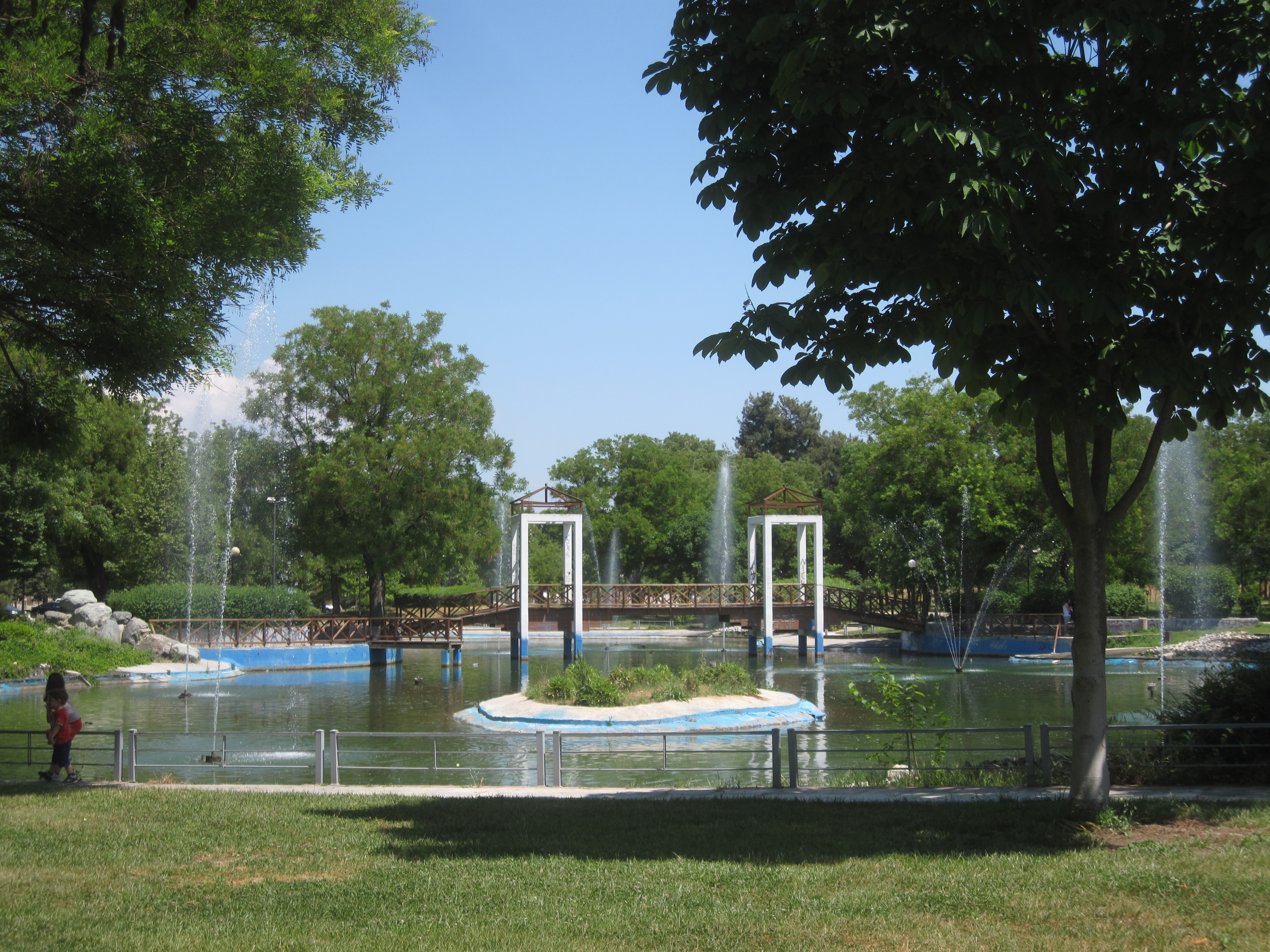
Alcazar park

The Thessalian Theatre (under construction)

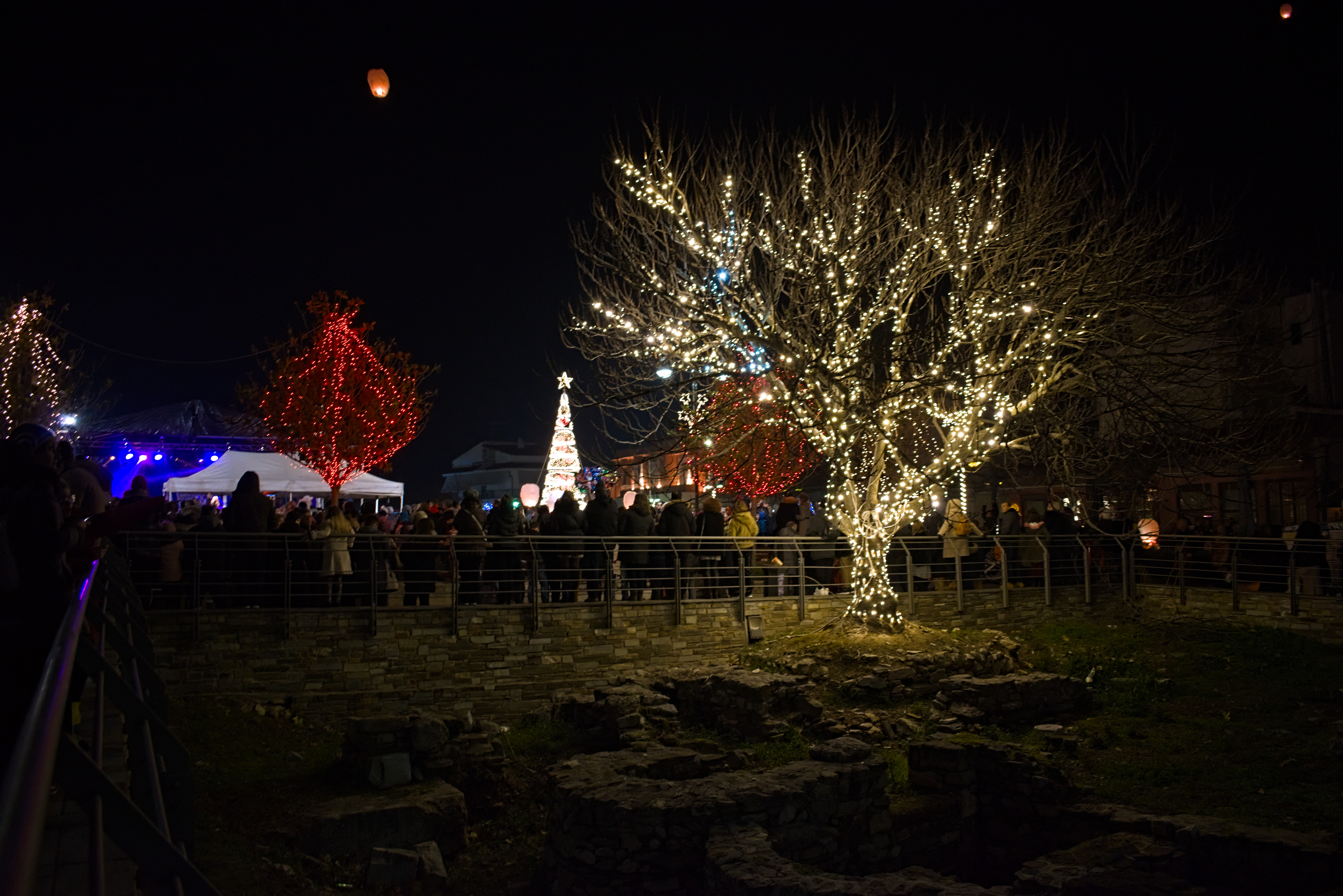
New Year's Eve concert at Frourio Hill

=== Theatres and Odeons ===
- Municipal Conservatory of Larissa
- Pappas's Mile Theatre
- Municipal Theatre OUHL of Larissa (Thessalian Theatre)
- Hatzigianeio Cultural Centre
- Tiritomba Shadows Theatre

=== Cuisine ===
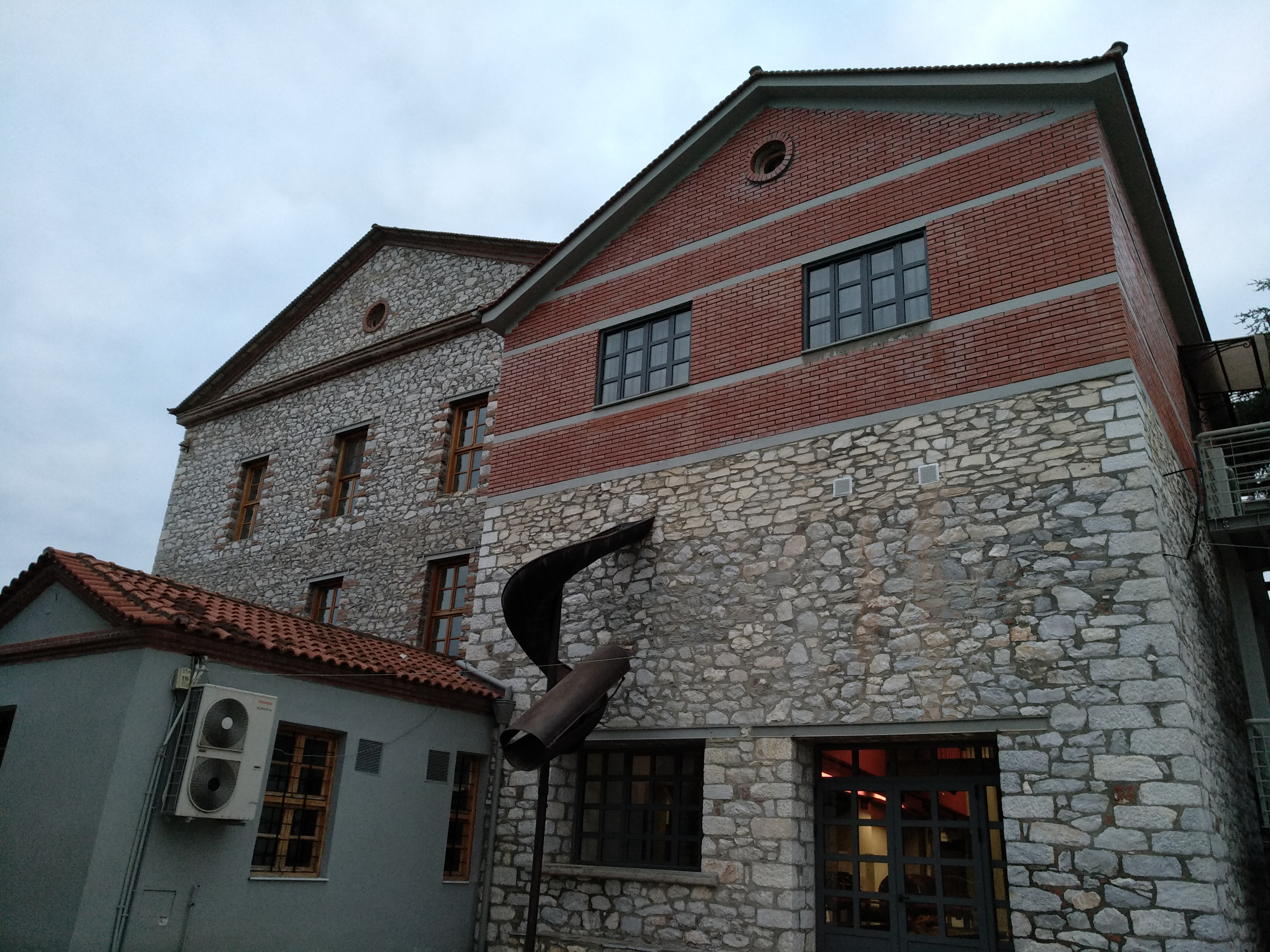
Old Mills of Pappas

Local specialities:

- Batzina (Μπατζίνα) pie baked in the oven
- Kelaidi (Κελαηδί)
- Pita (Πίτα, traditional pies with pasta phyllo, baked in the oven) like Kreatopita, Loukanikopita, Melintzanopita, Tyropita, Spanakopita
- Plastós (Πλαστός) pie
- Lahanópsomo (Λαχανόψωμο) cabbage bread
- Halvas (Χαλβάς) sweet

=== Museums ===
- Diachronic Museum of Larissa / Archaeological and Byzantine Myseum of Larissa
- Municipal Gallery of Larissa – G.I. Katsigras Museum
- Folklore and Historical Museum of Larissa
- Military Veterinary Museum of Larissa
- Museum of the Folklore Society of Larissa
- Museum of Grain and Flours

=== Media ===
- TV: Thessalian Radio Television (TRT), Astra TV, ForMedia TV
- Press: Eleftheria, Politia Larisseon (newspaper)

=== Festivals ===
Among the notable festivals that the city hosts, is the "Pineiou Festival" (mainly music), "Mill of Performing Arts" and "AgroThessaly", a major agricultural fair.

=== Organizations ===
- Panhellenic Federation of Cultural Associations of Vlachs

=== In popular culture ===
- A notable film of the Greek cinema partially shot in the area of Larissa and referred to the history of the region is Blood on the Land (1966) by Vasilis Georgiadis.

== Transport ==
Larissa sits in the middle of the plain of Thessaly, with connections to the A1 motorway and national roads EO3 and EO6.

- Larissa's Urban Bus System
- Larissa's Interurban System (Ktel Larissas)
- Larissa Central Railway Station Station at 39°37′46″N 22°25′22.2″E
- Mezourlo Freight Railway station at 39°37′08″N 22°24′30″E
- Larissa National Airport (military)

== Sports ==
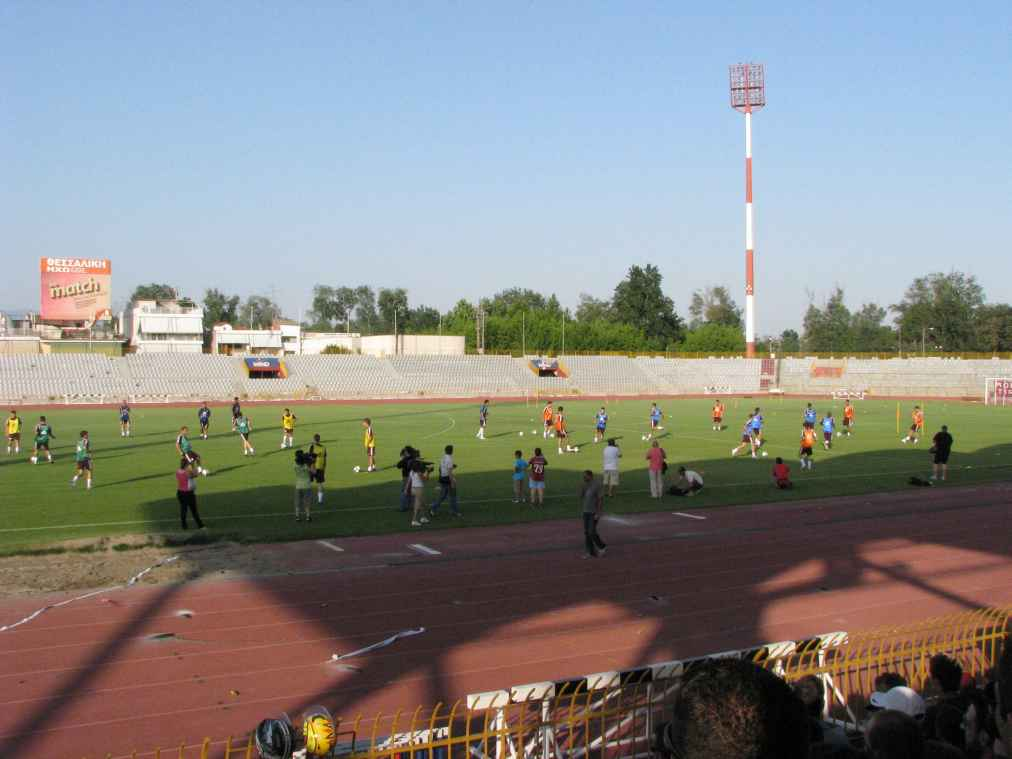
Alcazar Stadium

The local football club AEL FC currently participates in Super League Greece 2. The team won the Greek Championship, in 1988, and won the Greek Cup in 1985 and 2007. These titles place AEL among the five most important football clubs in Greece.

Two other professional football clubs with long histories also represent the city: Apollon and Iraklis.

AEL has hosted its home games at the AEL FC Arena, a UEFA 3-star-rated football ground, since November 2010. Other important sport venues are the National Sport Center of Larissa (EAK Larissas), which includes the Alcazar Stadium and the Neapoli Indoor Hall.

The National Sports Center of Larissa can accommodate a number of sports and events (football, basketball, wrestling, swimming, boxing, martial arts, handball, water polo, etc.), while the Sports Hall has hosted important athletic events (the 1995 FIBA Under-19 World Cup, the 1997 Women's EuroLeague Final Four, the 2003 Greek Basketball Cup Final Four, martial arts events, etc.), and it is also used for cultural events, such as dance festivals.

Notable sport clubs based in Larissa
Club	Sports	Founded	Achievements
Apollon Larissa	Football	1930	Presence in Super League 2
A.E.L. (Athletic Union of Larissa)	Football	1964	Winner of Super League Greece and Greek Cup
A.E.L. (Athletic Union of Larissa)	Basketball	2006	Previous presence in Greek Basket League
EA Larissa	Volleyball	1968	Previous presence in Greek Volleyball League
Iraklis Larissa	Football	1930/1982 (refoundation)	Presence in Super League 2
Olympia Larissa	Basketball	1979	Previous presence in Greek Basket League
Larisa	Basketball	1984	Presence in Greek Basket League
Gymnastikos S. Larissas	Basketball	1928	Previous in Greek Basket League
Filathlitikos Larissaikos Syllogos	Volleyball	1990	Previous presence in Greek Women's Volleyball League

== Historical population ==
The population of Larissa at different times was as follows:

Year	Municipal Unit	Municipality
1940	32,686	35344
1951	41,016	-
1961	56,010	-
1971	72,336	-
1981	102,426	-
1991	113,090	129,429
2001	131,095	145,981
2011	146,926	162,591
2021	148,562	164,095

== Notable people ==
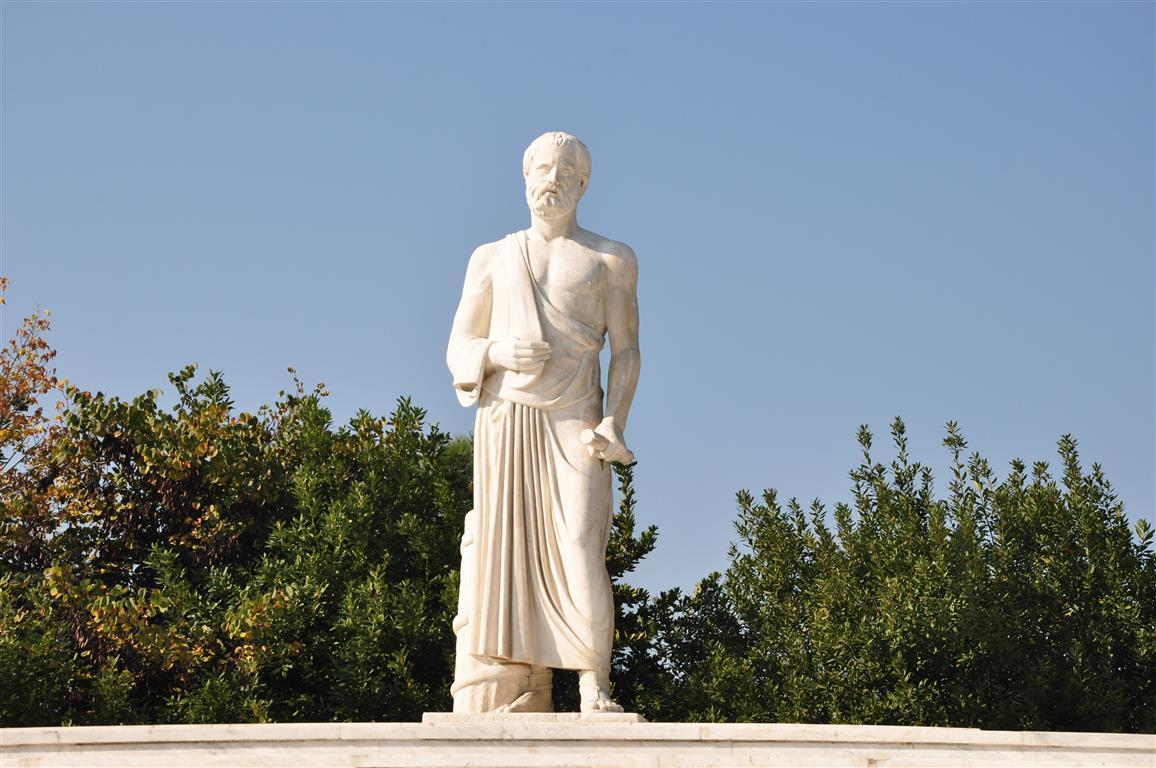
A statue of Hippocrates in the cenotaph monument (sculptor Georgios Kalakalas)

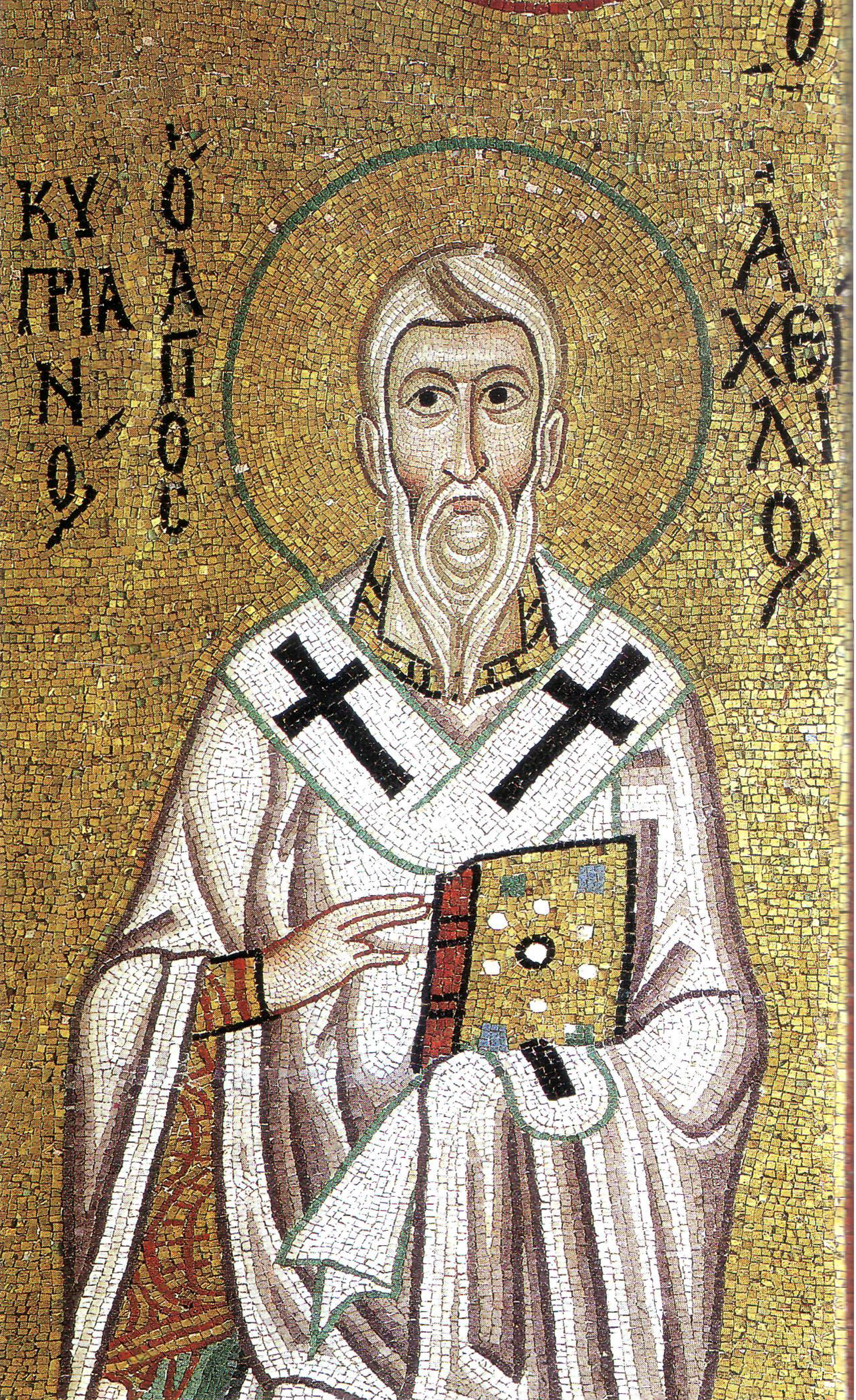
Achillius of Larissa

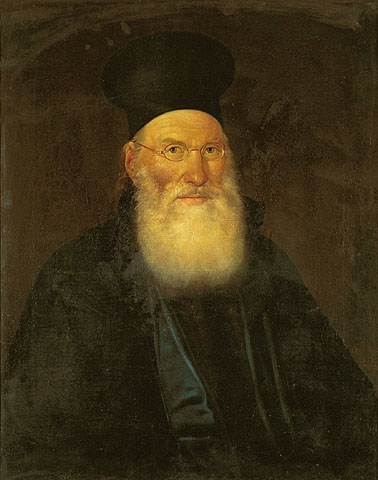
Theoklitos Farmakidis

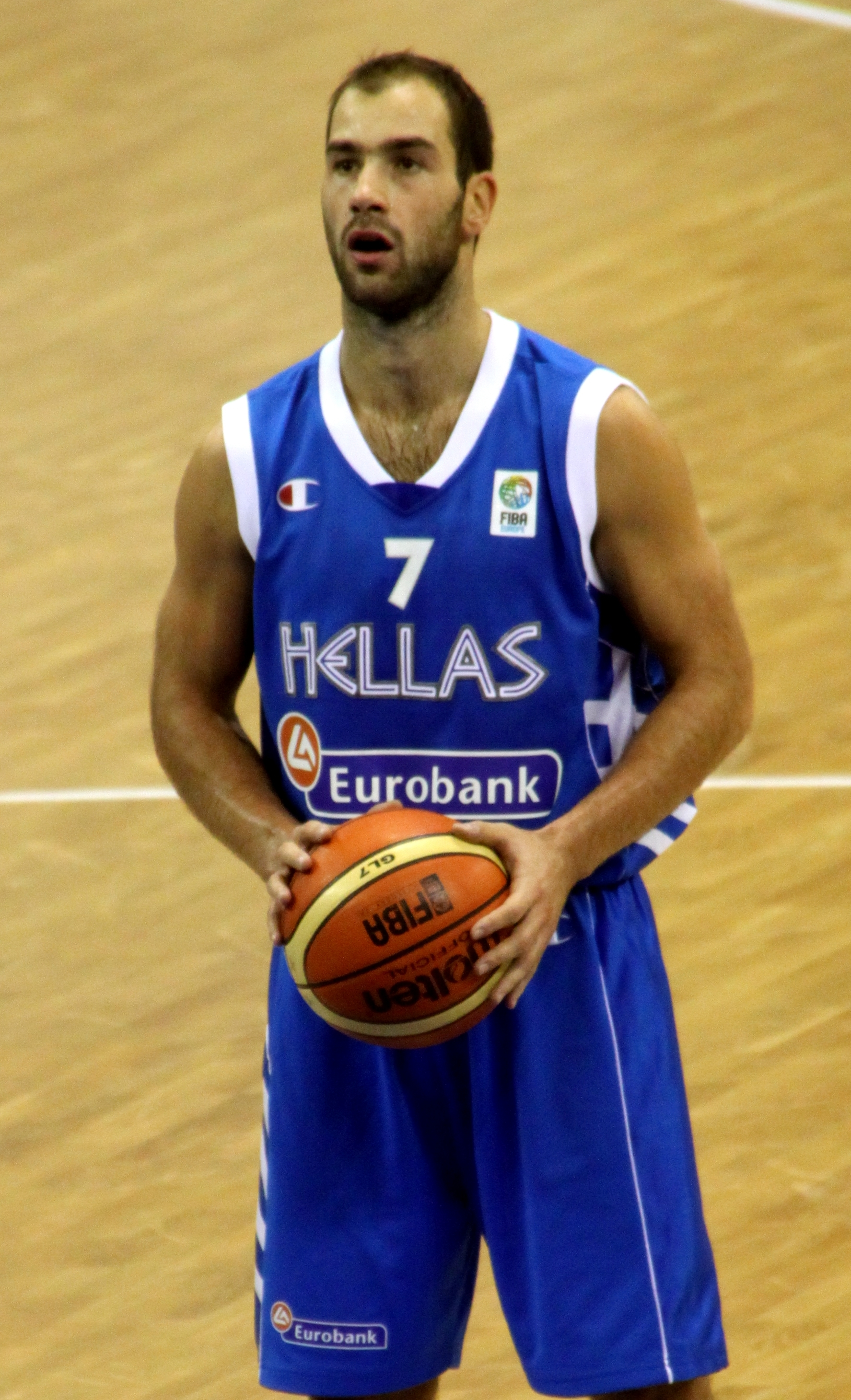
Vassilis Spanoulis

=== Ancient ===
- Campaspe, mistress of Alexander the Great
- Achilles (mythology)
- Gorgias of Leontinoi (483 BC–375 BC), sophist. He worked and died in Larissa.
- Hippocrates of Kos (460 BC–370 BC), physician. He worked and died in Larissa.
- Medius (4th century BC), officer of Alexander the Great
- Philinna (4th century BC), dancer, mother of Philip III Arrhidaeus
- Philo (1st century BC), philosopher
- Hegesaratus (c. 48 BC), political leader
- Heliodorus of Larissa, mathematician
- Achillius of Larissa (270–330), first bishop and patron saint of the city

=== Medieval ===
- Irene of Larissa, empress consort of Bulgaria
- Agatha, wife of Samuel of Bulgaria
- Nikoulitzas Delphinas, Byzantine lord of Larissa

=== Modern ===
- Alexander Helladius, scholar
- Giorgakis Olympios (1772–1821), commander of the Greek War of Independence
- Theoklitos Farmakidis (1784–1860), scholar, figure of the Modern Greek Enlightenment
- Moshe Pesach (1869–1955), rabbi
- Michail Sapkas, mayor of Larissa and MP
- Achilleas Protosyngelos, Army officer
- M. Karagatsis (1908–1960), novelist and journalist
- Sofia Vembo (1910–1978), singer and actress
- Eleni Zafeiriou (1916–2004), actress
- Antonis Vratsanos (1919–2008), resistance figure during WWII
- Kostas Gousgounis (1931–2022), pornographic actor
- Athena Tacha (1936–), artist
- Efthymios Christodoulou (1932–), economist
- Georgios Souflias (1941–2026), politician
- Angela Kokkola, politician
- Petros Efthimiou (1950–), politician
- Lakis Lazopoulos (1956–), actor, comedian, script author and director
- Thanasis Papakonstantinou (1959–), poet, songwriter, singer and musician
- Georgios Mitsibonas (1962–1997), footballer
- Maria Papayanni (1964–), writer
- Vassilis Karapialis (1965–), footballer
- Christos Papoutsis, politician
- Maria Spyraki, politician
- Ekaterini Voggoli (1970–), discus thrower
- Alexis Georgoulis (1974–), actor
- Kostas Chalkias (1974–), footballer
- Yannis Goumas (1975–), footballer
- Dimosthenis Dikoudis (1977–), basketball player
- Nestoras Kommatos (1977–), basketball player
- Fani Halkia (1979–), hurdler
- Dimitris Spanoulis (1979–), basketball player
- Theofanis Gekas (1980–), footballer
- Vangelis Moras (1981–), footballer
- Vassilis Spanoulis (1982–), basketball player
- Giorgos Tsiaras (1982–), basketball player
- Vasilios Koutsianikoulis (1988–), footballer
- Haido Alexouli (1991–), long jumper
- Chrysoula Anagnostopoulou (1991–), discus thrower
- Vasileia Zachou (1994–), gymnast

== Twin towns – sister cities ==
Larissa is twinned with:

- Anapa, Russia (2016)
- Bălți, Moldova (1986)
- Banská Bystrica, Slovakia (1985)
- Foča, Bosnia and Herzegovina (1994)
- Knoxville, United States (1996)
- Kos, Greece (1978)
- Larnaca, Cyprus (1990)
- Rybnik, Poland (2003)
- Stara Zagora, Bulgaria (1985)

== Gallery ==
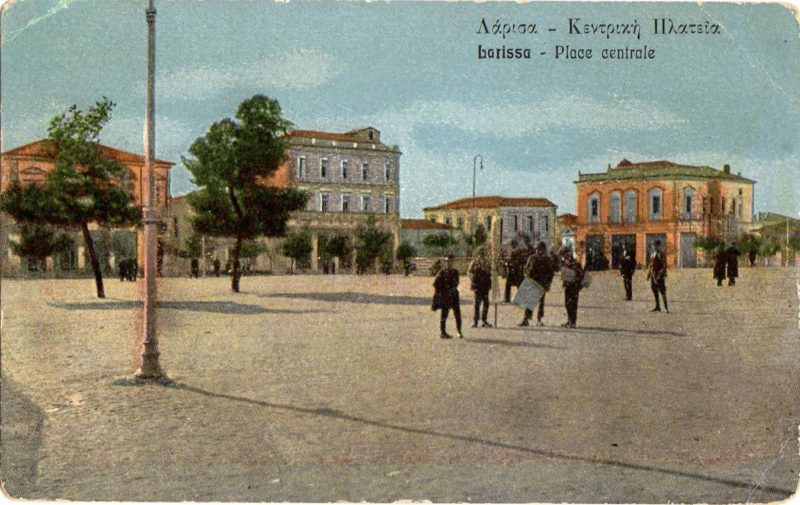
Central square (Themidos), 1920

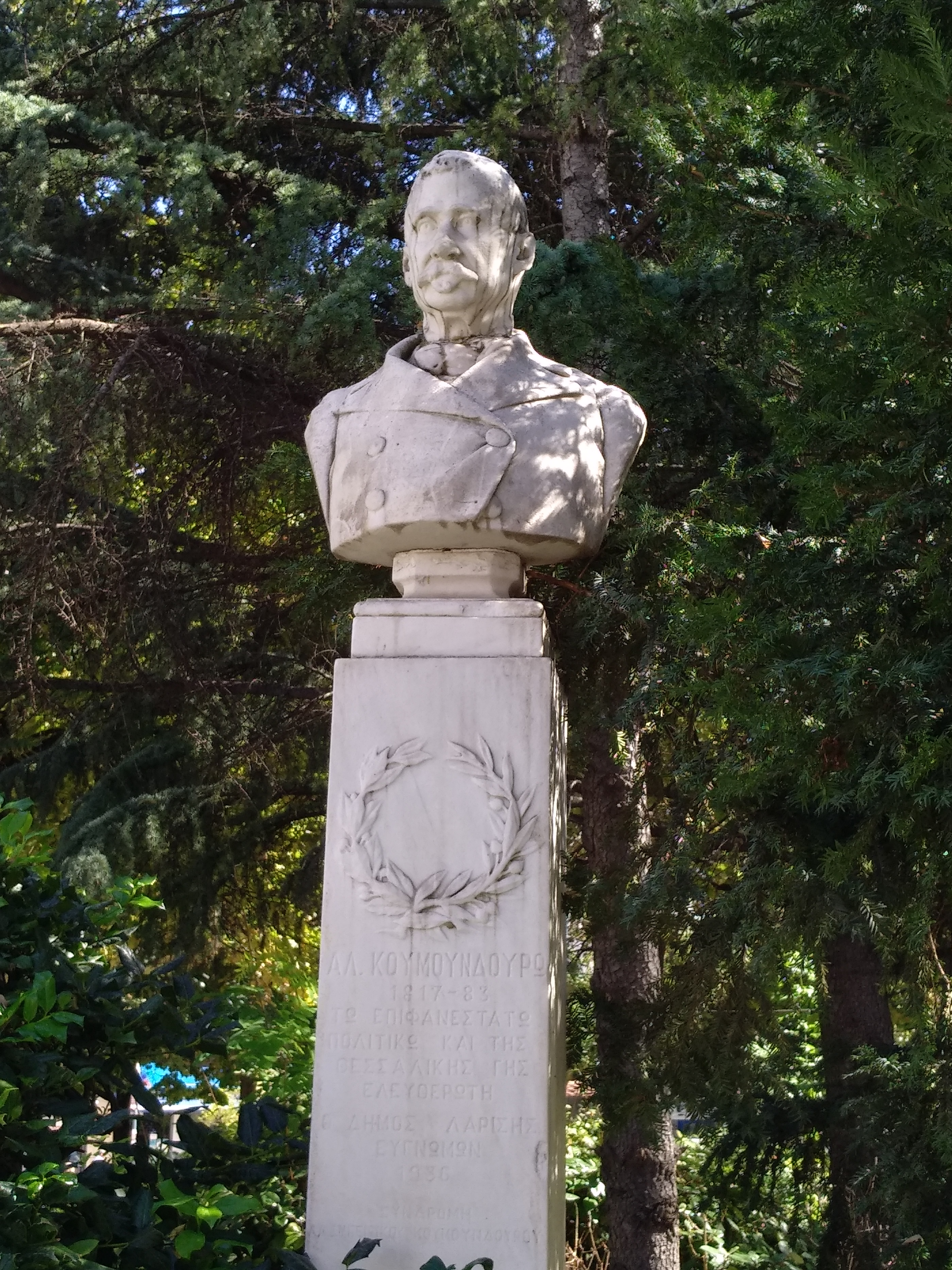
A bust of Koumoundouros in central square

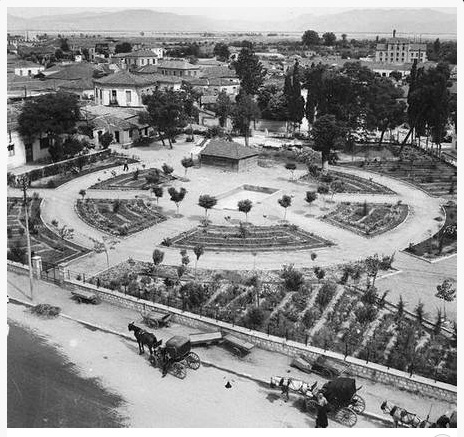
View of the city in the 1940s

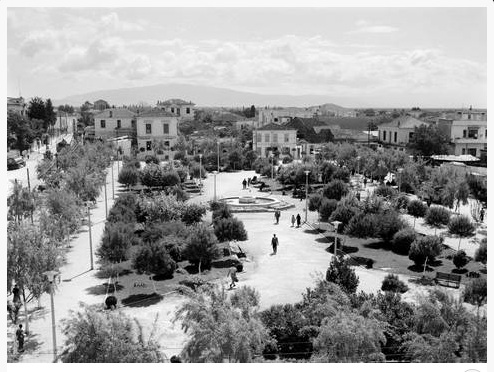
Tachidromiou Square in 1950s

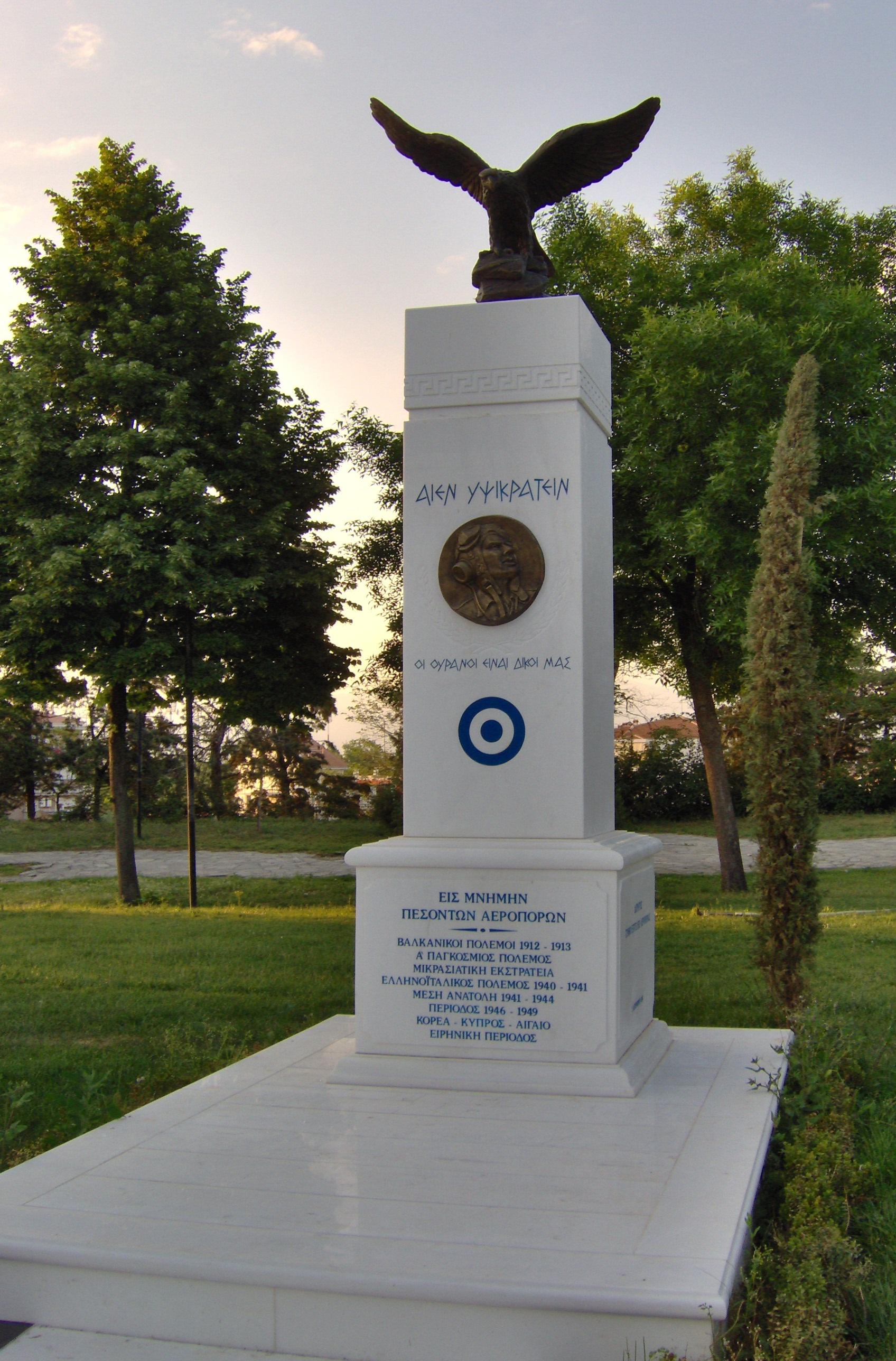
War memorial

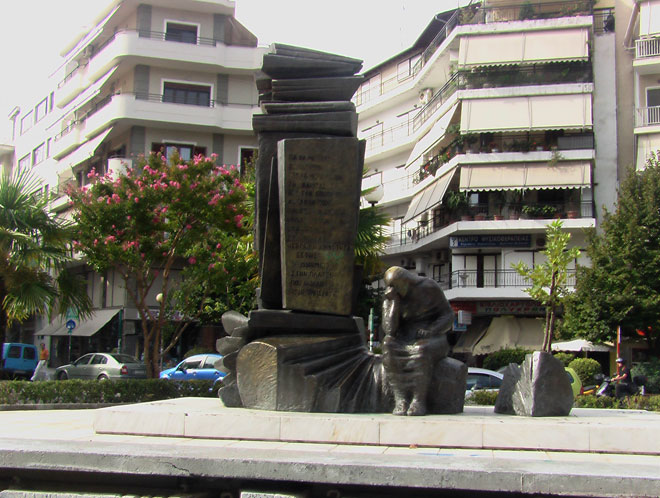
Holocaust memorial

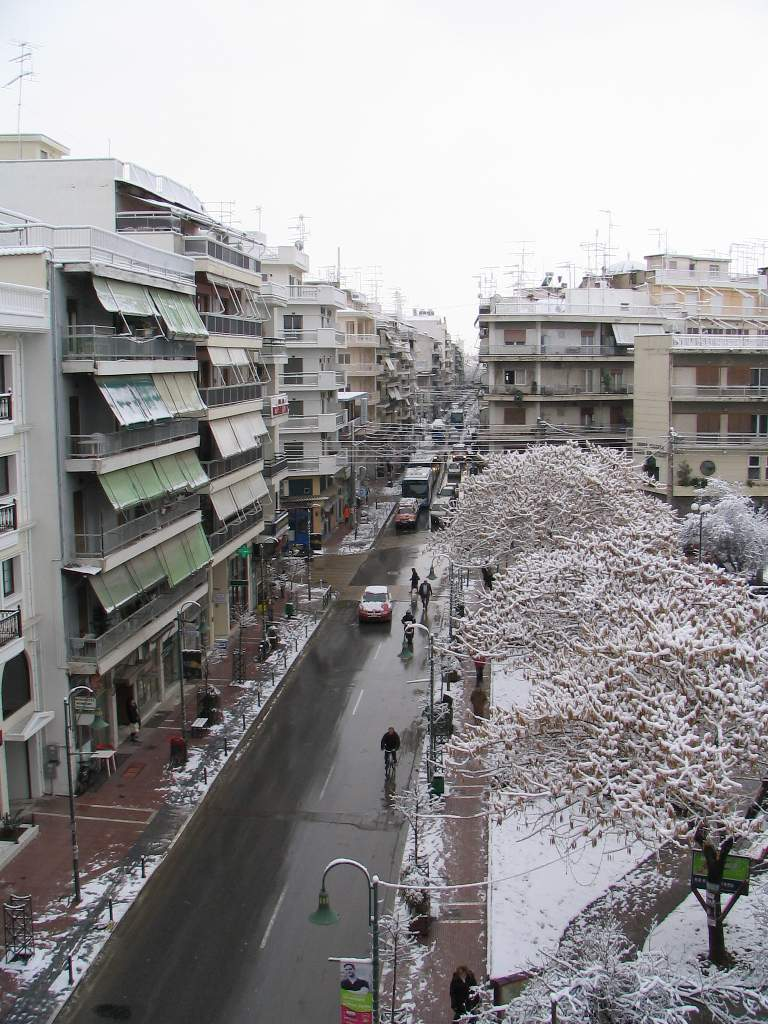
City with snow in winter

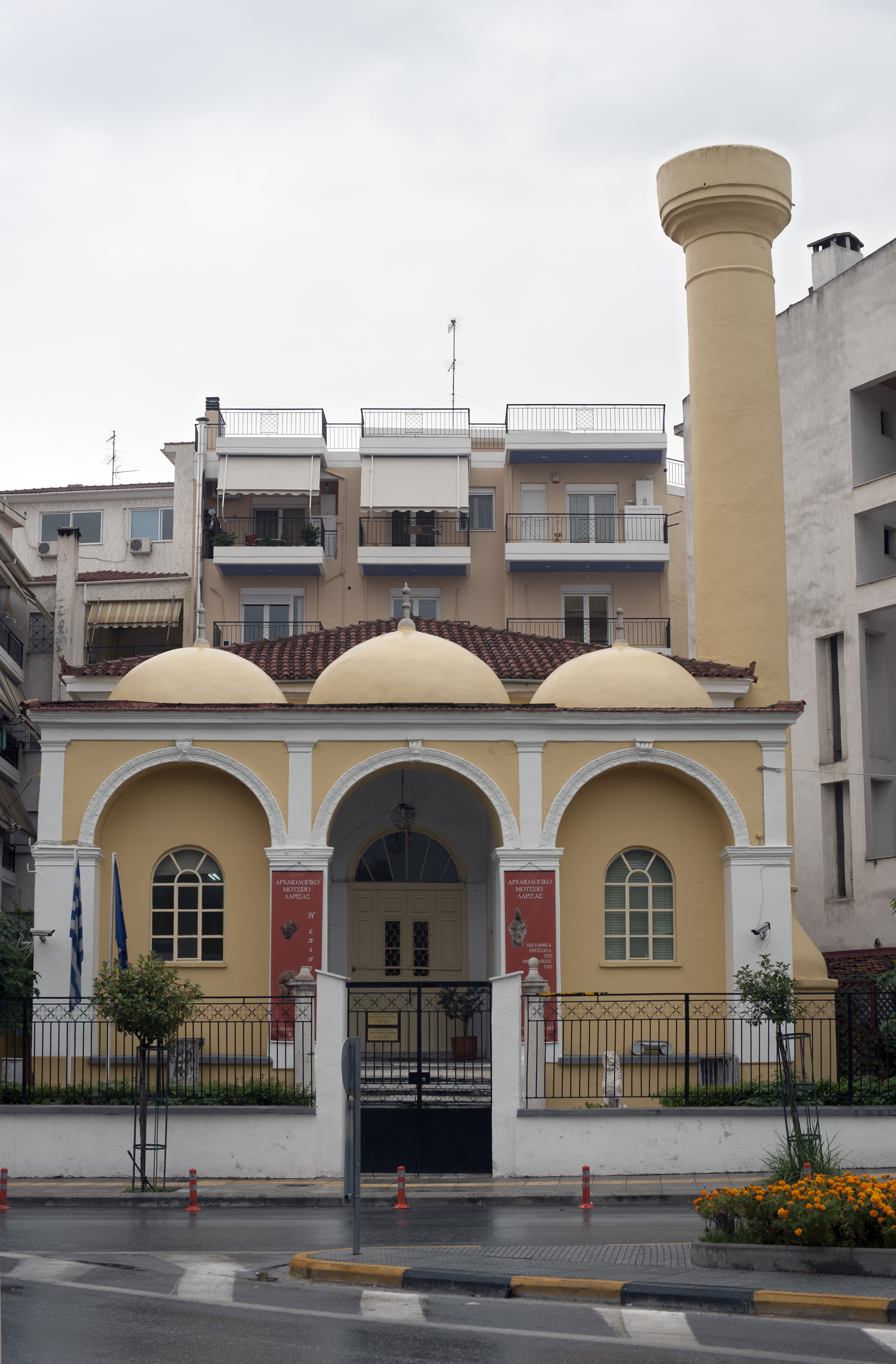
Yeni Tzami, the former seat of the Archeological Museum of Larissa

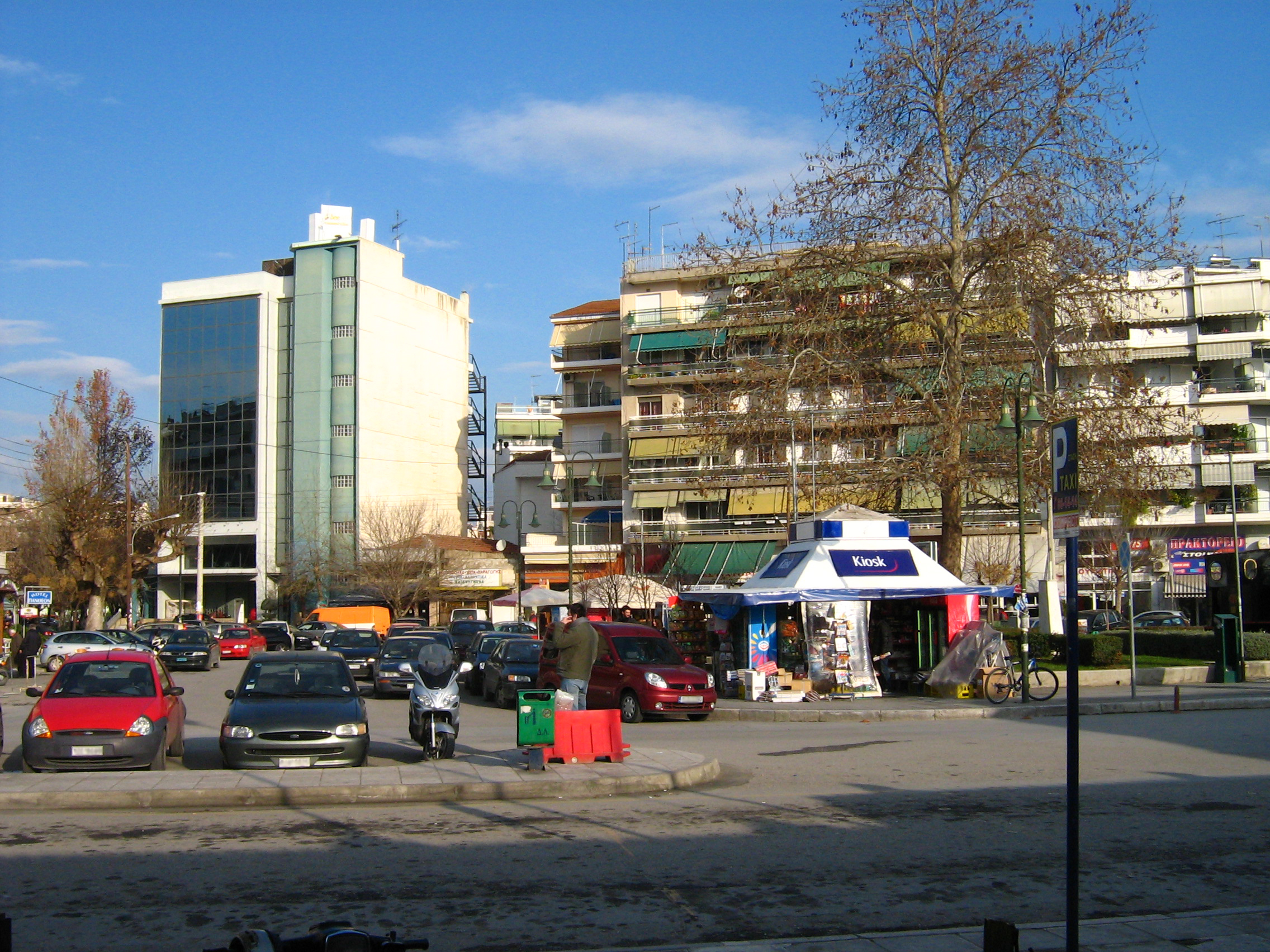
Rail Station Square

== See also ==
- Ampelakia, Larissa
- Vale of Tempe
- University of Thessaly
- CERETETH, Center of Technology Thessaly
