= Basilica of St. Achillios =

Coordinates: 39°38′27.8″N 22°24′56.7″E

Basilica of St. Achilleios
- Βασιλική του Αγίου Αχιλλείου
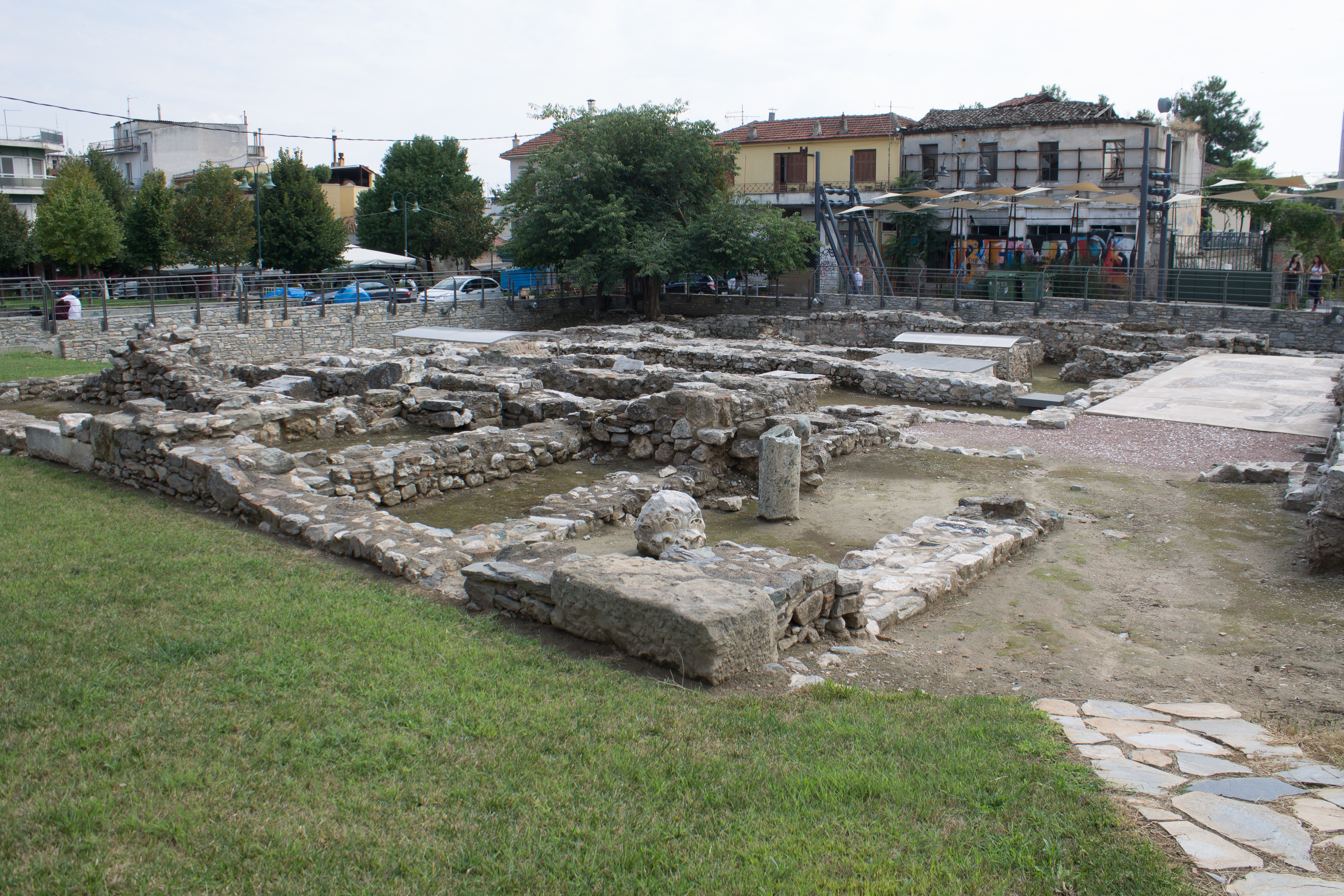
- Remains of the basilica today

- Location within Greece
- Location: Larissa
- Country: Greece
- Denomination: Eastern Orthodox

History
- Status: Ruined
- Dedication: St. Achillius

Architecture
- Architectural type: Basilica
- Style: Byzantine architecture
- Completed: mid-6th century
- Demolished: late 15th century

Administration
- Metropolis: Metropolis of Larissa

The Basilica of St. Achilleios (Greek: Βασιλική του Αγίου Αχιλλείου) is an early Byzantine basilica on the acropolis of Larissa, Greece, dedicated to the city's patron saint, St. Achilleios.

The church was discovered and excavated in 1978, during works on the local free-air market.

The excavations revealed the foundations of a mid-6th-century church, dedicated to St. Achilleios according to surviving inscriptions. Achillios had lived in the early 4th century and been the city's metropolitan bishop for 35 years. The structure is located on the top of the Frourio Hill, the city's acropolis, between the First Ancient Theatre and the later, Ottoman-era Bedesten.

It is a typical three-aisled basilica with a narthex and exonarthex. Originally it was covered by a wooden roof. Various graves have been excavated in and around the church, including three vaulted tombs and a number of box-like graves. A vaulted tomb on the eastern end of the northern aisle, decorated with crosses, may be the grave of St. Achilleios.

As the cathedral of the Metropolis of Larissa, the church was repaired in the middle Byzantine period, when it became the centre of a large cemetery stretching to the east. Excavations have revealed a number of outbuildings erected during this period, probably used as storehouses, baths, charitable institutions, etc. The church is attested until the middle of the 14th century, and was probably demolished when the Ottomans built the Bedesten in the late 15th century.
