= Second Ancient Theatre, Larissa =

Ancient Greek theatre

Coordinates: 39°38′25″N 22°24′43″E

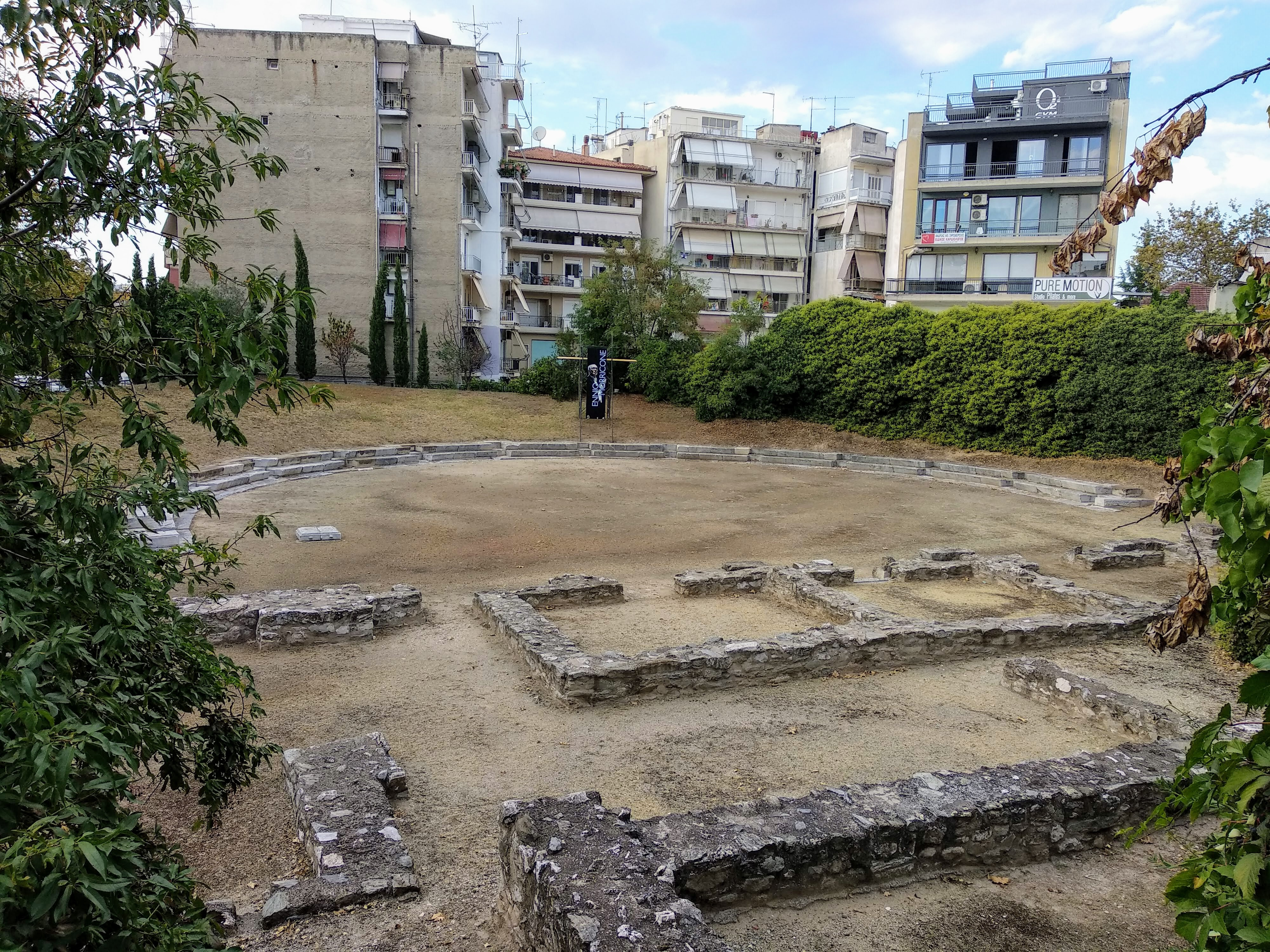
Photo of the theatre today: remains of the skene in the foreground, the semi-circular orchestra with the base of the thymele, and the two rows of edolia of the koilon.

The Second Ancient Theatre of Larissa (Greek: Β΄ Αρχαίο Θέατρο της Λάρισας) is an ancient Greek theatre in the city of Larissa in Thessaly, Greece.

== History ==
The theatre was built in the second half of the 1st century BC, on the southwestern slopes of the Pefkakia hill. Its construction is probably connected to the conversion of the city's original theatre, which was converted into an arena for gladiatorial contests and public spectacles after the Roman conquest of Greece. The excavator of the site, Athanasios Tziafalias, suggested in particular a connection with the festival of Eleutheria, which featured athletic and horsemanship contests as well as theatrical, musical, and poetry performances. An inscription dedicated to Demeter and the Kore indicates that the site also housed a temple dedicated to them (thesmophorion).

The theatre was left in ruins in the Middle Ages, when a Byzantine church dedicated to the Holy Wisdom or to Saint Paraskevi was erected in its place. The church was in turn replaced by the mosque of Hasan Bey was erected on the site during the Ottoman period. The Pefkakia hill was levelled in the 1950s to provide space for housing construction.

The theatre was rediscovered in 1978, during digging for the construction of a new apartment building complex. The site was excavated in 1985–1986. The theatre has been occasionally used for theatrical performances since.

== Description ==
Only the stage (skene) and the chorus area (orchestra) were completed; the semi-circular seating area (koilon) and the side entrances (parodoi) were left incomplete, apparently due to inability to fund their completion. The koilon is divided by 14 stairs into thirteen tiers, each with two rows of low seats of grey-white marble (edolia); the rest were never completed, and probably wooden seats (ikria) were used instead. The orchestra has a diameter of 29.7 metres (97 ft) and is composed of two layers of stamped earth mixed with gravel. The thymele (a small square altar) is located on its right. It is of white marble, decorated with Lesbian-style kymatia (decorative bands). It stood on a stepped pedestal of three steps, of which the two lower ones survive.

The marble used in the theatre was not newly quarried, but reused from an older building, probably of circular shape. Some of the blocks feature inscriptions from freedmen dating to the late 3rd century BC.

== See also ==
- List of ancient Greek theatres
