= Estia Pieridon Mouson =

Coordinates: 40.269574°N 22.512776°E

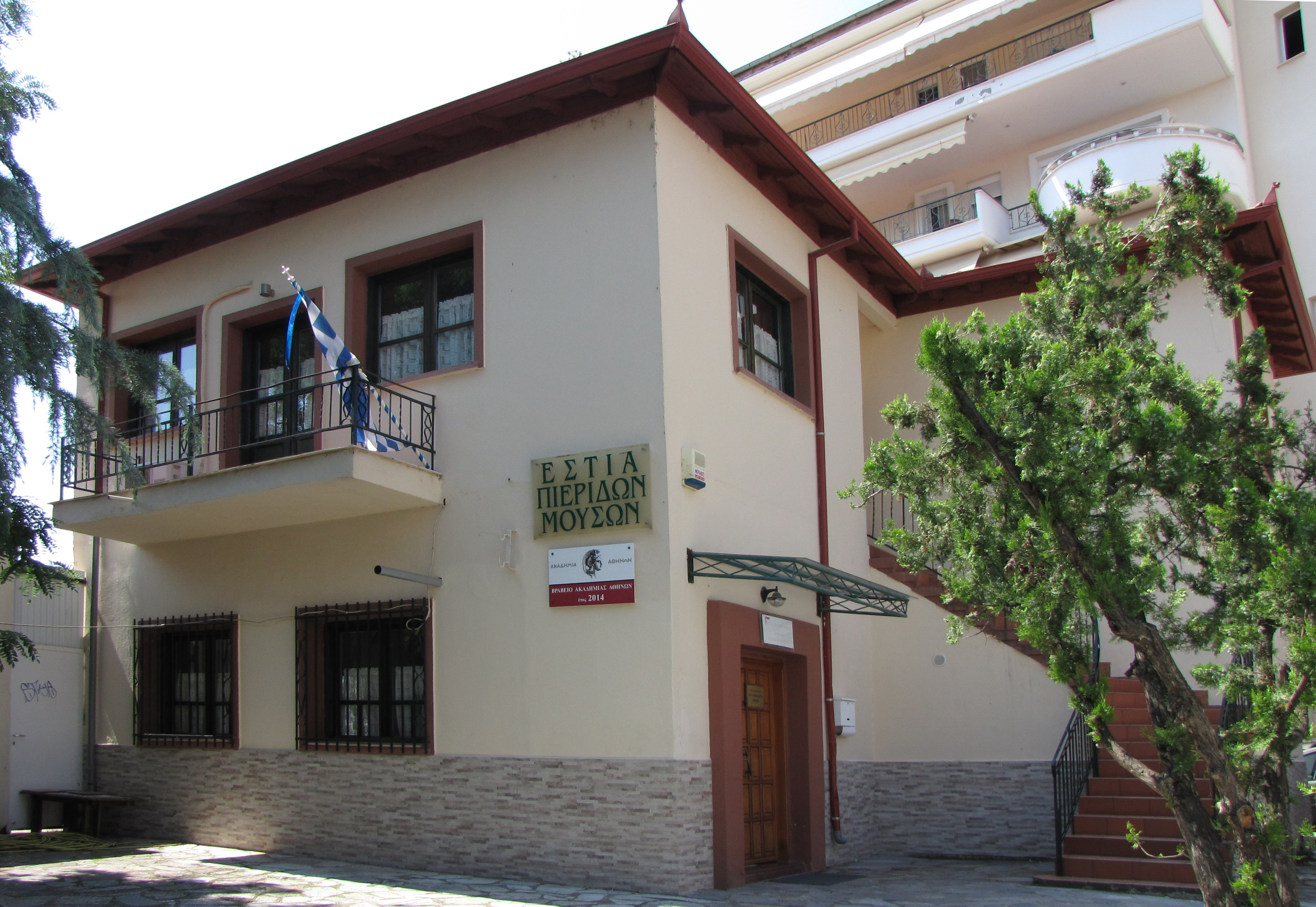
Headquarter of the Estia Pieridon Mouson, Katerini

The Estia Pieridon Mouson (Greek Εστία Πιεριδών Μουσών, home of the pieric muses) is one of the oldest and most important cultural associations of the prefecture Pieria with seat in Katerini.

== Location ==
Plateia Politismou 1, in 60100 Katerini, Pieria, Greece

== History ==
63 members founded the club on May 12, 1954, in Katerini. By 2014, the number of members had increased to 800, now (as of June 2018), the number has grown to around 1,000 members. One of the founding members' intentions was to offer the "new citizens" of Katerini (Greeks displaced from Asia Minor and the Black Sea region (Pontos Greeks) a common cultural home. The board of the association consists of nine members. Since 1989, Estia Pieridon Mouson is a member of the International Council of Organizations of Folklore Festivals and Folk Arts, CIOFF, organizing an international folklore festival annually according to the organization's rules.

== Activities ==
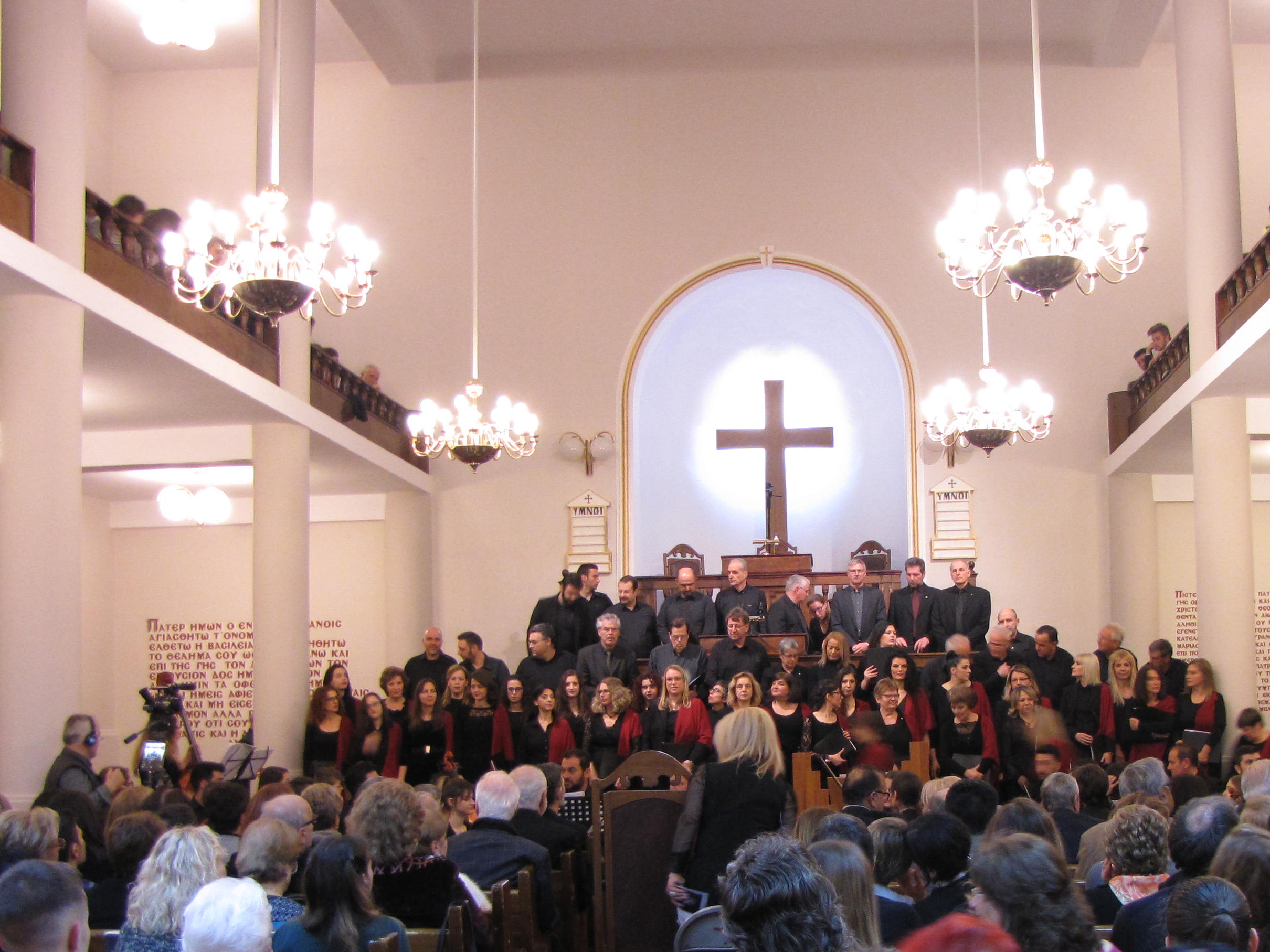
Estia, Mozarts Requiem performed in the Evangelical church of Katerini

Every year, concerts are held at Easter and Christmas. The venues alternate between an Orthodox and an Evangelical church.

From March to June of each year, in addition to other activities of each department, several events and exhibitions are organized. These include:

Exhibitions:

- Exhibitions of craftsmanship (dolls, jewelry etc.)
- Historical exhibitions
- Painting
- Pictures
- Sculptures

Events:

- Book presentations
- Information about local history
- Music events of all kinds, from classical music to heavy metal
- Philosophical Café

Furthermore, CD's and DVD's of music recordings and performances were recorded and books are published.

== Departments ==
=== Choir ===
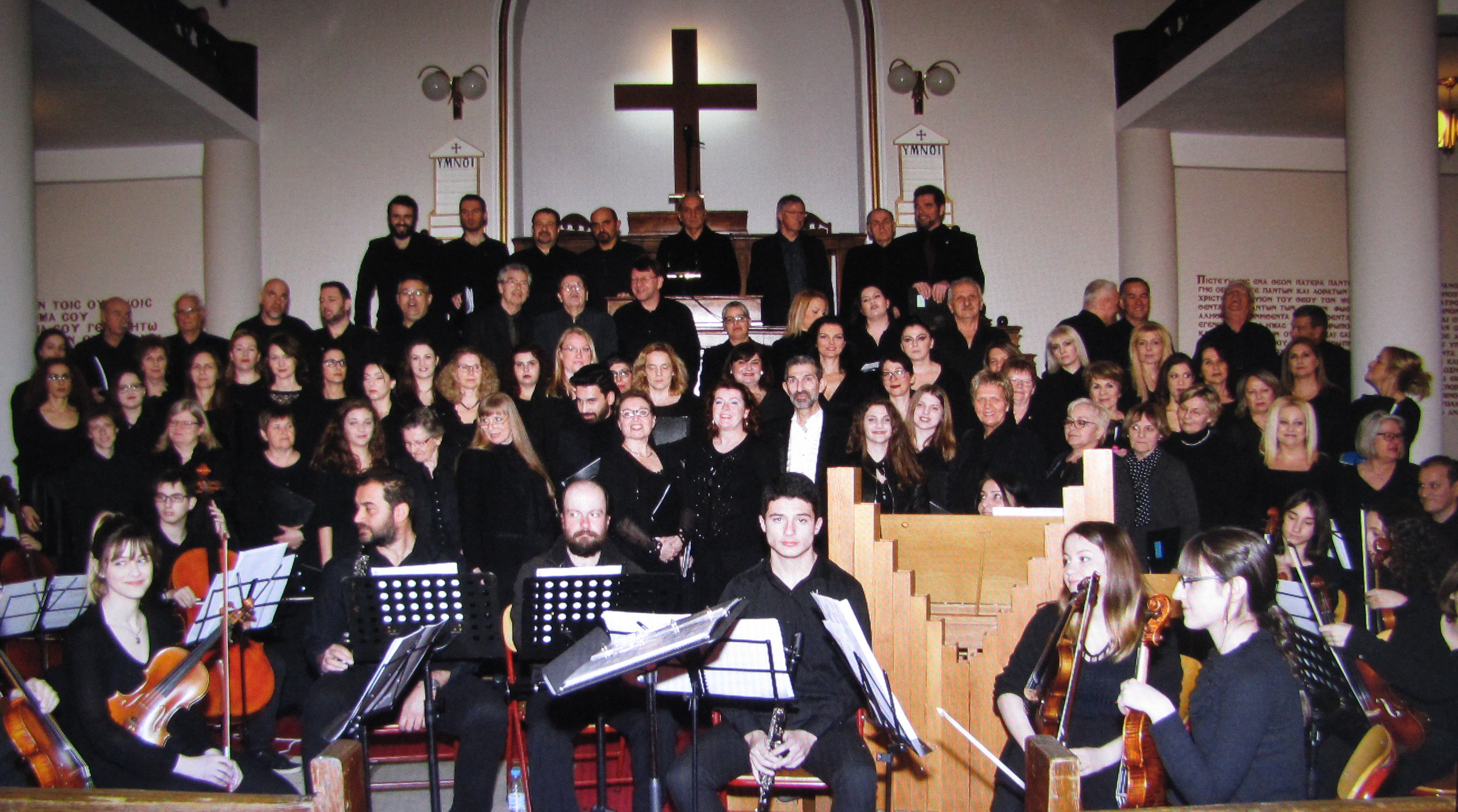
Estia, musicians and choir

The mixed choir exists since the foundation of the association. The repertoire includes classical Greek songs as well as contemporary works. In 1959, the choir won the first prize in the National Competition of Choirs in Athens (ASDAN). The choir managed to win several national and international awards; The members organized several musical events with national and international guests.

This was followed by domestic performances and abroad; some stations were:

- Czech Republic
- Germany
- Great Britain
- Holland
- Hungary
- Italy
- Romania
- Serbia

In the late 1960s, a men's choir for church songs was launched.

In 2004, another branch was created called "De Profundis". In 2005, they won the first prize at the "Meeting of Choirs" in Gianitsa. It was followed by domestic performances and abroad.

=== Speech and Arts ===
Since the founding of Estia Pieridon Mouson, the department Speech and Arts has been involved in the planning and execution of any kind of event of local and foreign artists, also in organizing the "Celebrations of the Muses", the forerunner of the Olympus Festival. In 1990, an exhibition of traditional Chinese art was organized in collaboration with the Chinese Ambassador, the Delphi Cultural Center and Pieria Prefecture. In the following years, exhibitions were held on the topics of archaeology, history and culture. In 1993, 1998, 2003 and 2009, conferences were held on the subject of "Pieria of Byzantine and post-Byzantine times". Helpers and participants included the Aristotle University, Thessaloniki and the 9th Ephoria for Byzantine antiquities.

The group has published three books on the topic "Pieria of Byzantine and Post-Byzantine Time" (1997, 2002 and 2008), a fourth work is completed and is currently in print (as of July 2018).

=== Folk dance ===
The group was founded in 1969 and today comprises around 150 active dancers, musicians and dance teachers. For performances, the club owns about 200 traditional costumes from several parts of Greece. The department performs traditional local dances and dances from all over Greece. Separate premises were rented for the activities of the division. Meanwhile, thousands of children, adolescents and adults have been taught. The education of the children starts from the age of 10; not only do they learn the appropriate movements, they are also instructed about the history of the dances. The dancers are taught knowledge of traditional Greek musical instruments, about their structure and handling.

In addition to appearances in the Greece, the dance group began in 1970 also traveling abroad. Some of the countries visited so far:

- Austria
- Belgium
- Canada
- China
- Cyprus
- Czech Republic
- Estonia
- France
- Germany
- Holland
- Hungary
- Italy
- Luxembourg
- Poland
- Portugal
- Romania
- Spain
- Switzerland
- Yugoslavia

=== Theater ===
The group "Pieric Theater" was founded in 1970. Classical pieces such as Iphigenia by Euripides, Antigone by Sophocles or The Peace by Aristophanes are performed. But also contemporary plays are in their repertoire.

=== Olympus Festival ===
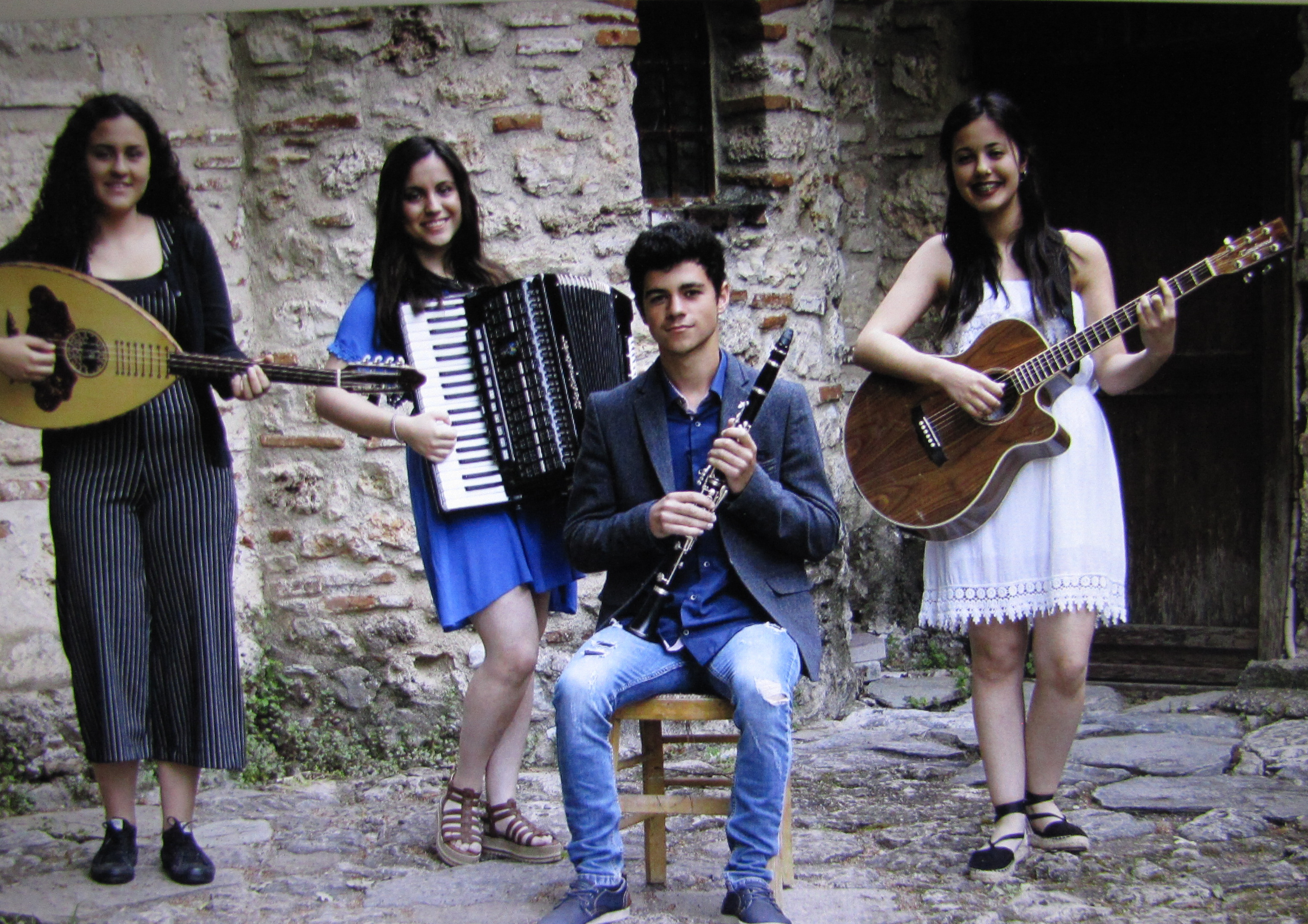
Estia, Folk music youth group

At the beginning of the 1970s, members of the Estia organized the Hellenistic Theater in Dion and the interior of the Castle of Platamon to perform theatre and concerts there. From 1972 to 1992, these locations were used by the Estia Pieridon Mouson, as venues for the successor of the "Celebrations of the Muses", the Olympus Festival. From 1992 the festival was transferred to the newly founded association OR.FE.O (Οργανισμός Φεστιβάλ Ολύμπου, ΟΡ.ΦΕ.Ο). The Olympus Festival became the second largest summer festival in Greece.

=== Folklore and organization of traditional festivals ===
This department formed in 1990, with the aim of researching the folklore of Pieria and founding a folklore museum in Katerini. Some members craft traditional costumes, based on models from the beginning of the 20th century.

Meanwhile, 41 festivals have been organized and held responsibly. More than 15,000 dancers, singers and their companions from 30 countries were taken care of by the association.

=== Folk music ===
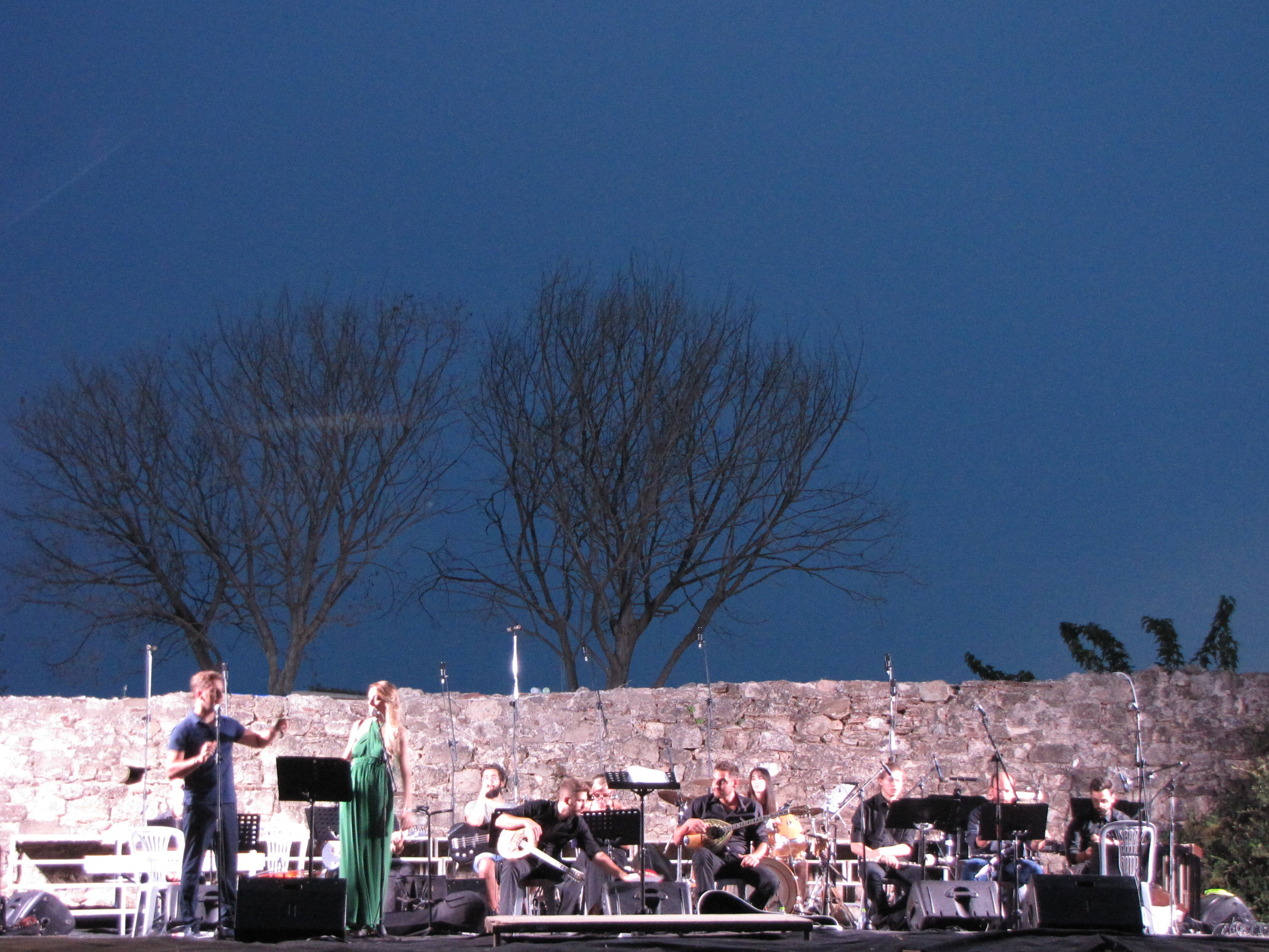
Estia Pieridon Mouson, concert at the ancient site of Pydna

Until its spin-off in 1992, the musicians performed together with the folk dance group of the club. The musical repertoire ranges from ancient pieces of music of Pieria and Macedonia to the contemporary music of all over Greece. The main concern of the musicians is the preservation and distribution of the local songs. So far, 120 titles have been recorded and archived.

=== Photography ===
Since 1994, the photographers of the association have founded their own department called "Iris". Talented and semi-professional members pass on their knowledge in seminars. There is a darkroom, library, photographic equipment, training facilities and a library. During the transnational project "The National Cultural Heritage Through the Light of Photography" (2013 and 2015) Iris collaborated with photographers from five other European countries.

The works of the group were exhibited in different cities within Greece.

=== Blood donation ===
In 2011, members began to donate blood in organized form in collaboration with the State Hospital in Katerini.
