= Frourio Hill =

Historical acropolis of Larissa, Greece

Coordinates: 39°38′29.0″N 22°24′58.0″E

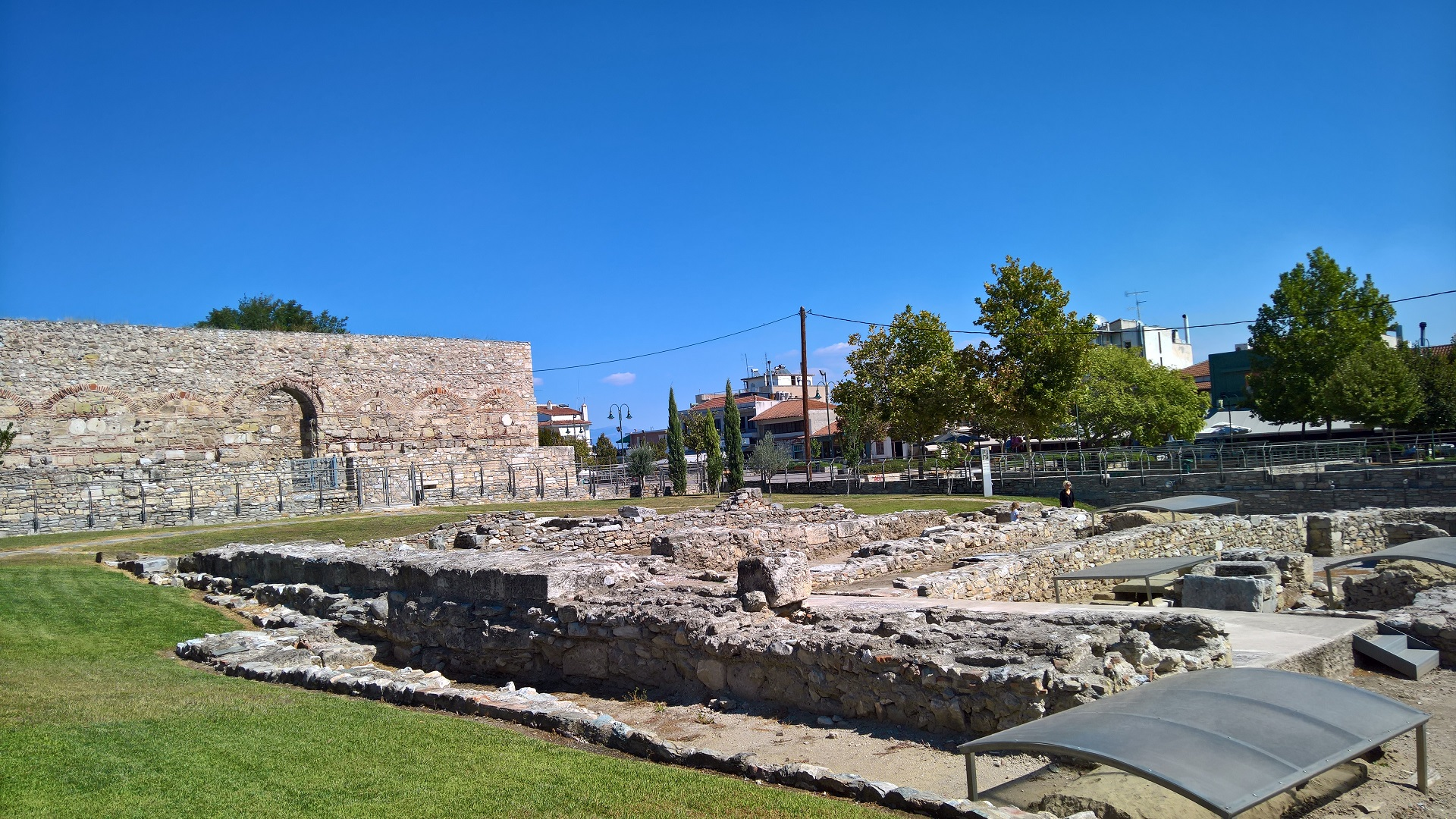
Photo of the hilltop today, with the ruins of the early Byzantine basilica of St. Achillios in the foreground, and the Bedesten of Larissa in the background left

The Frourio Hill (Greek: Λόφος Φρουρίου, romanized: Lofos Frouriou, lit. 'Fortress Hill') is the historical acropolis of the city of Larissa, Greece. It was the citadel of the city in antiquity as well as in Byzantine times, and features a number of important archaeological sites.

The only height in the wider area, the Frourio hill has been inhabited continuously since the earliest settlement of the city.

As the citadel of the city in antiquity, it was the site of the main temples, as well as the First Ancient Theatre. Archaeological excavations in modern times have uncovered an early Christian basilica dedicated to Saint Achillios, an early Byzantine bath, remnants of the early Byzantine walls constructed under Justinian I (r. 527–565), and a middle Byzantine church.

Under Ottoman rule, the area was known as the "great mahalla" (τρανός μαχαλάς), and was the only Greek and Christian quarter of the city, which was otherwise settled by Turks. The Ottomans constructed a covered market, the Bedesten, at the centre of the hill, around which the city's market and bazaar grew. In the 19th century, the Bedesten was transformed into a fort, giving the area its modern name.
