= List of ancient Greek theatres =

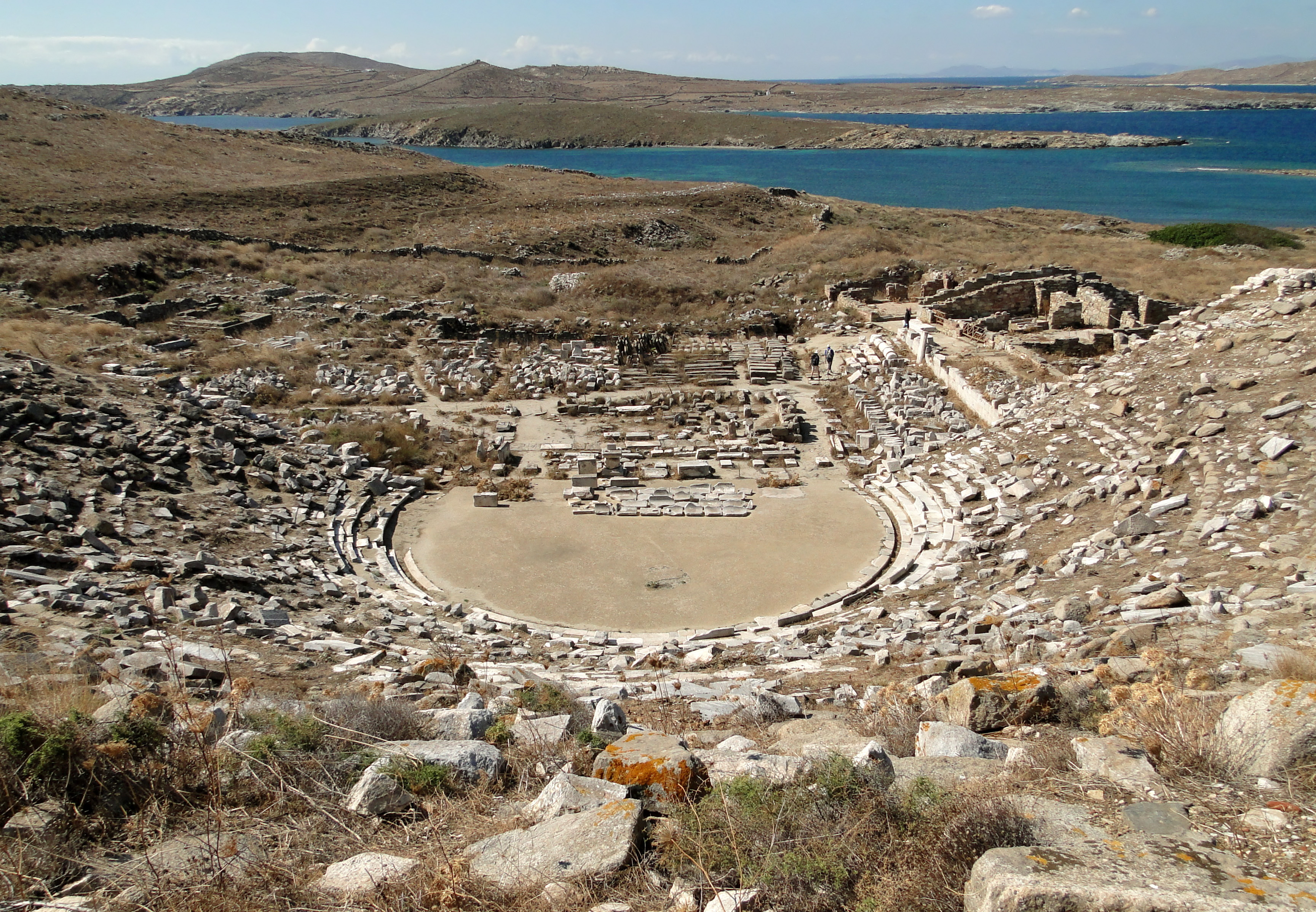
Ancient Greek theatre in Delos

This is a list of ancient Greek theatres by location.

== Attica and Athens ==
- Theatre of Dionysus, Athens
- Theatre of Thorikos, East Attica
- Odeon of Athens, Athens
- Theatre of Zea, Piraeus, Athens
- Theatre of Aegina, Attica
- Theatre of Oropos, Oropos, East Attica
- Theatre of Rhamnous, East Attica

== Continental Greece and Euboea ==
- Theatre of Chaeronea, Boeotia
- Theatre of Orchomenos, Orchomenus (Boeotia)
- Theatre of Delphi, Delphi
- Theatre of Stratos, Aetolia-Acarnania
- Theatre of Oiniades, Aetolia-Acarnania
- Theatre of Eretria, Euboea
- Theatre of Thebes, Thebes

== Thessaly and Epirus ==
- First Ancient Theatre, Larissa
- Second Ancient Theatre, Larissa
- Theatre of Dodona, Ioannina
- Theatre of Ambracia, Arta
- Theatre of Omolion, Larissa
- Theatre of Demetrias, Volos
- Theatre of Cassope, Preveza
- Theatre of Gitanae, Thesprotia
- Theatre of Apollonia, in Illyria
- Theatre of Bouthrotos (modern Butrinti)
- Theatre of Byllis

== Macedonia and Thrace ==
- Theatre of Dion, Pieria
- Theatre of Mieza, Imathia
- Theatre of Amphipolis, Serres
- Theatre of Abdera, Xanthi
- Theatre of Vergina (Aigai), Imathia
- Theatre of Olynthus, Chalcidice
- Theatre of Philippi, Kavala
- Theater of Thassos
- Theatre of Maroneia, Rhodope
- Theatre of Ohrid, Ohrid

== Peloponnese ==
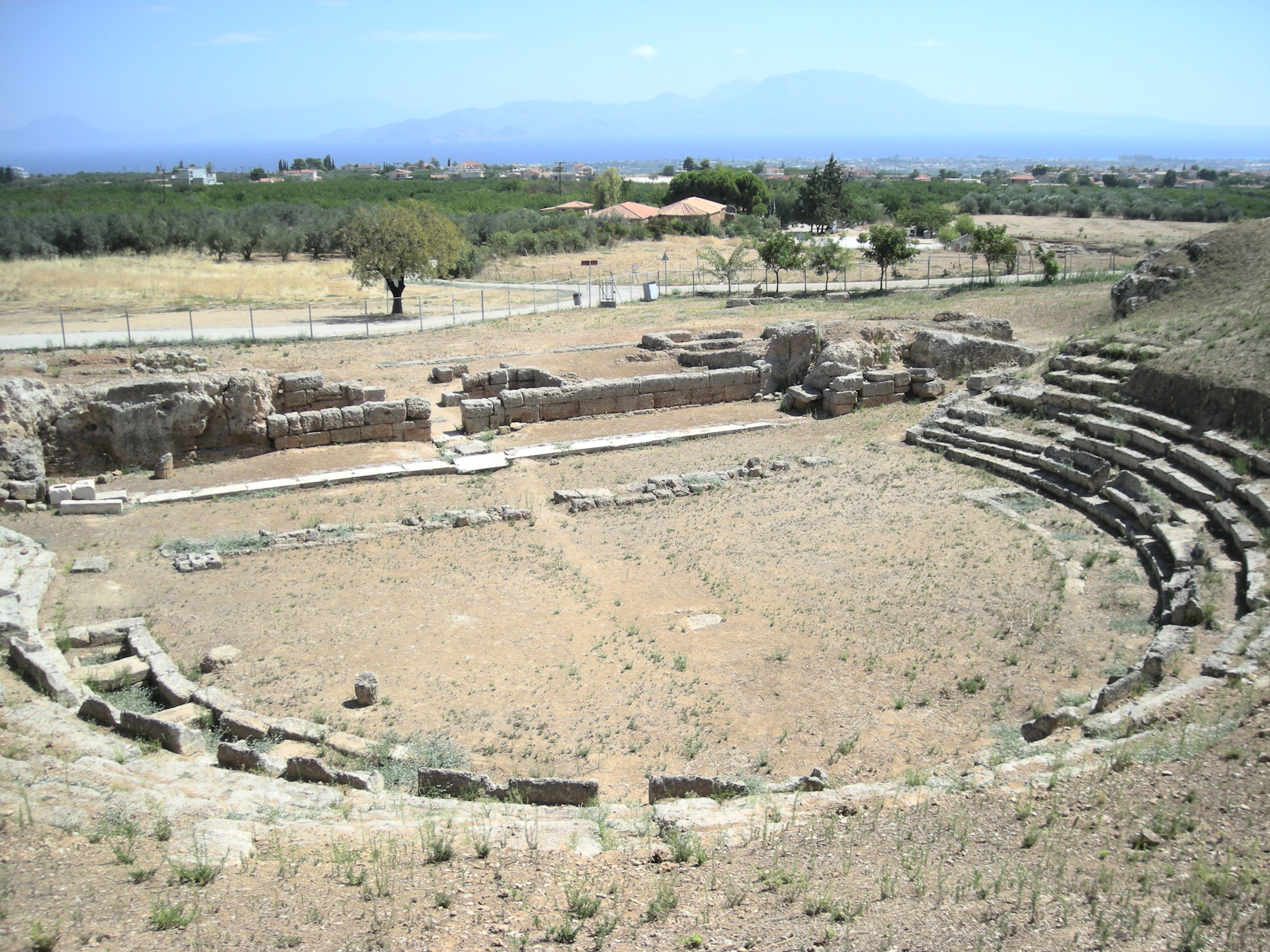
The ancient theatre of Sikyon

- Theatre of Corinth, Corinthia
- Theatre of Argos, Argolis
- Theatre of Epidaurus, Epidaurus
- Theatre A' of Epidaurus, Argolis
- Theatre B' of Epidaurus, Argolis
- Theatre of Megalopolis, Arcadia
- Theatre of Aigeira, Achaea
- Theatre of Elis, Eleia
- Theatre of Gytheion, Laconia
- Theatre of Isthmia, Corinthia
- Theatre of Mantineia, Arcadia
- Theatre of Messene (Ithome), Messenia
- Theatre of Orchomenos, Arcadia
- Theatre of Sicyon, Corinthia
- Theatre of Sparta, Laconia

== Aegean Islands ==
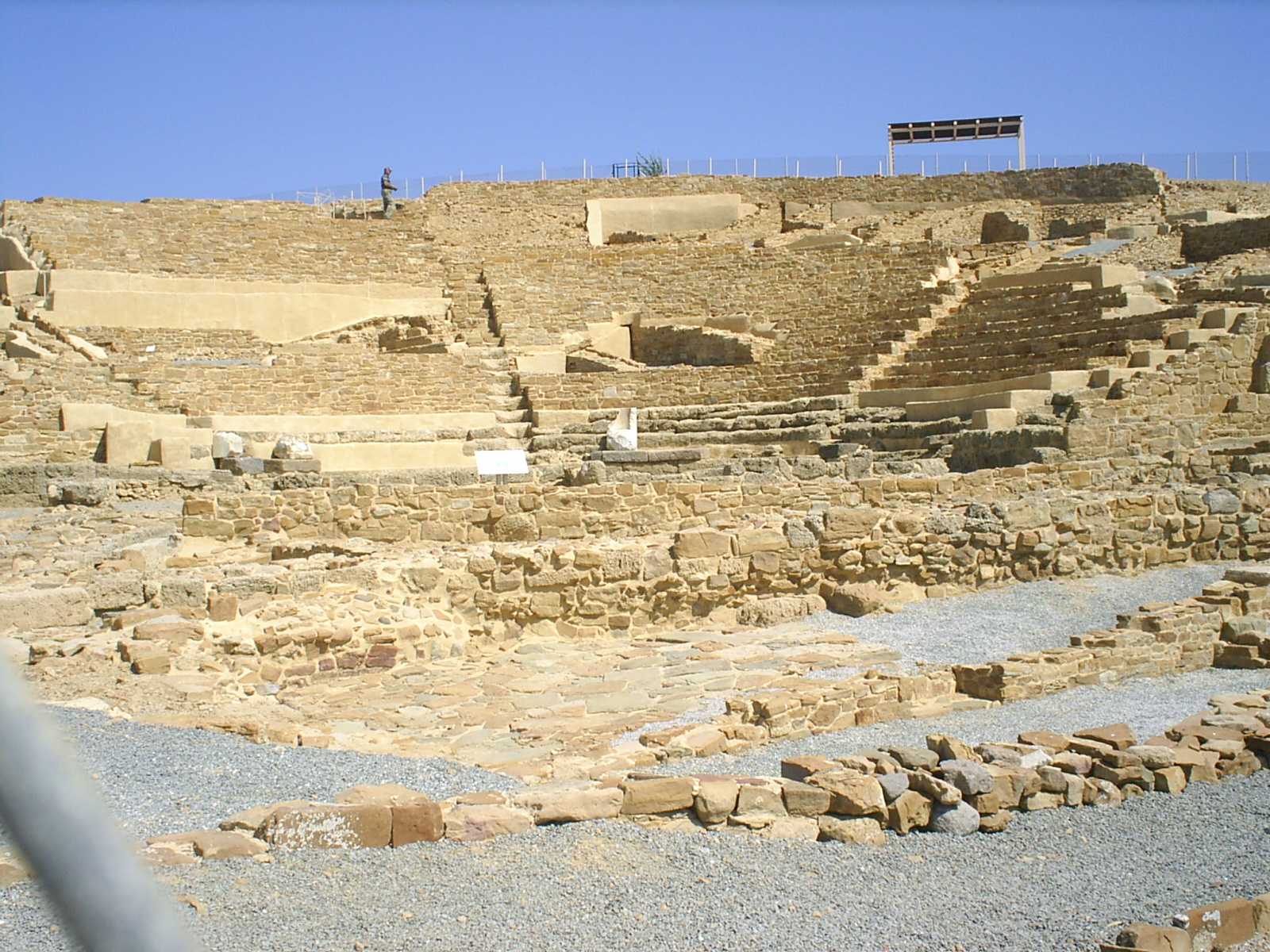
The ancient theater of Hephaistia

- Theatre of Aptera, Crete
- Theatre of Delos, Cyclades
- Theatre of Milos, Cyclades
- Theatre of Rhodes, Dodecanese
- Theatre of Mytilene, Lesbos
- Theatre of Hephaistia, Lemnos
- Theatre of Samothrace
- Theatre of Thasos
- Theatre of Thera, Cyclades
- Odeon of Kos, Dodecanese

== Magna Graecia ==
- Theatre of Metapontum, Basilicata

== Cyprus ==
- Theatre of Soli, Soli
- Theatre of Salamis, Salamis
- Theatre of Kourion, Kourion
- Odeon Amphitheatre, Nea Paphos

== Sicily ==
=== Remains discovered ===
Name	Date	Ancient town	Cavea diameter (metres)	Coordinates	Image
Theatre of Agira	c. 4th century BC	Agyrion (Ἀγύριον)	around 90	37°39′15″N 14°31′23″E	
Theatre of Akragas	End of the 3rd century BC	Akragas (Ἀκράγας)	100	37°17′46″N 13°35′27″E	
Theatre of Akrai	2nd century BC	Akrai (Ἄκραι)	37.5	37°03′27″N 14°53′41″E	
Theatre of Catania	End of the 5th century BC (as Alcibiades held a consultation there during the Athenian Expedition to Sicily	Katane (Κατάνη)	98 (after being rebuilt by the Romans)	37°30′10″N 15°05′01″E	
Theatre of Helorus	4th-3rd centuries BC	Eloro (Έλωρος)		36°50′28″N 15°06′20″E	
Theatre of Heraclea Minoa	End of the 4th century BC - start of the 3rd century BC	Heraclea Minoa (Ἡράκλεια Μινῴα)	50.6	37°23′40″N 13°16′50″E	
Theatre of Halaesa	2nd century BC	Halaesa (Ἄλαισα)	77	37°59′59″N 14°15′43″E	
Theatre of Hippana	350-300 BC (destroyed 258 BC)	Hippana (Ἱππάνα)	52	37°42′08″N 13°26′14″E	
Theatre of Monte Jato	4th century BC	Iaitas (Ἰεταί)	67.9	37°58′03″N 13°11′52″E	
Theatre of Morgantina	350-325 BC	Morgantina (Μοργάντιον)	57.5	37°25′48″N 14°28′45″E	
Theatre of Segesta	Mid 4th century BC or 2nd century BC	Segesta (Ἕγεστα)	63	37°56′28″N 12°50′38″E	
Archaic Theatre of Syracuse	5th century BC	Syracusae (Συράκουσαι)		37°04′31″N 15°16′25″E	
Theatre of Syracuse	3rd century BC	Syracusae (Συράκουσαι)	138	37°04′34″N 15°16′30″E	
Theatre of Soluntum	4th century BC	Solus (Σολοῦς)	46.6	38°05′39″N 13°31′55″E	
Ancient theatre of Taormina	3rd century BC	Tauromenion (Ταυρομένιον)	109 (after Roman rebuilding)	37°51′09″N 15°17′32″E	
Greek theatre of Tindari	End of the 4th century BC	Tyndaris (Τυνδαρίς)	76	38°08′37″N 15°02′32″E	

=== Attested but undiscovered ===
Three more are mentioned in literary sources but have not been found archaeologically:

Name	Date	Province	Town	Ancient city	Sources
Theatre of Enna	3rd century BC	Enna	Enna	Henna (Ἔννα)	Diodorus Siculus, Bibliotheca historica, XXXIV,11-14; Livy, Ab Urbe condita libri, XXIV,39; Polyaenus, Stratagems, VIII,21.
Theatre of Kaukana		Ragusa	Santa Croce Camerina	Kaukana (Καυκάνα)	Claudius Ptolemaeus, Geography, III,4.7; Procopius, Histories of the Wars - Vandal War, I,14; Tommaso Fazello, Julius Schubring.
Greek theatre of Messina	4th century BC	Messina	Messina	Messena (Μεσσήνη)	

== Asia Minor and Ionia (Turkey) ==
- Theatre of Aigai (Aeolis), Manisa Province
- Theatre of Alexandria Troas, Çanakkale Province
- Theatre of Antiphellus, Kaş, Antalya Province
- Theatre of Aphrodisias, Geyre, Aydın Province
- Theatre of Arycanda, Antalya Province
- Theatre of Aspendos, Antalya Province
- Theatre of Assos, Çanakkale Province
- Theatre of Ephesus, İzmir Province
- Theatre of Halicarnassus, Bodrum, Muğla Province
- Theatre of Hierapolis, Denizli Province
- Theatre of Knidos, Datça Peninsula, Muğla Province
- Theatre of Cyme (Aeolis), İzmir Province
- Theatre of Laodicea, Denizli Province
- Theatre of Letoon, Antalya Province
- Theatre of Miletus, Aydın Province
- Theatre of Myrina, İzmir Province
- Theatre of Pergamon, İzmir Province
- Theatre of Phocaea, İzmir Province
- Theatre of Pinara, Muğla Province
- Theatre of Pitane (Aeolis), İzmir Province
- Theatre of Priene, Aydın Province
- Theatre of Sardis, Manisa Province
- Theatre of Side, Antalya Province
- Theatre of Termessos, Antalya Province
- Theatre of Telmessus, Fethiye, Muğla Province
- Theatre of Troy, Çanakkale Province

== See also ==
- Odeon
- Amphitheatre
- Ancient Greek architecture
- Theatre of ancient Greece
- List of extant ancient Greek and Roman plays
