= Thorikos =

Ancient Greek city and deme

Coordinates: 37.7381°N 24.0536°E

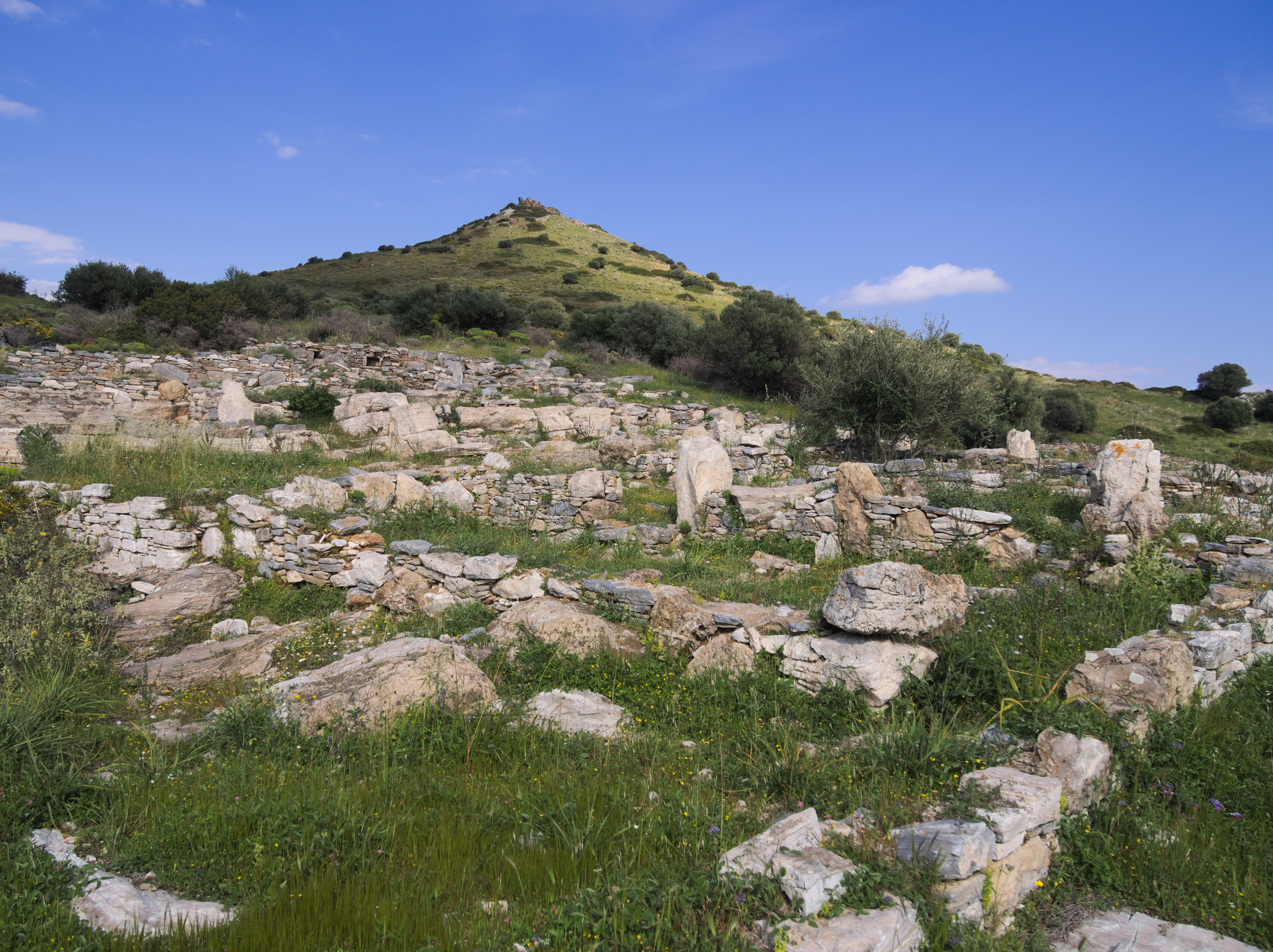
Archaeological site of Thorikos

Thorikos or Thoricus (Ancient Greek: Θορικός) was a city, and later a deme in the southern portion of ancient Attica, one of the twelve original settlements that were united in the synoikismos attributed to Theseus to form Archaic Athens. It was later a deme of the phyle of Acamantis. Near it are the mines of Laurion, where lead and silver was mined from Neolithic times, and worked in the industrial quarter of the settlement. There is a theatre dating from c. 525–480 BC. The modern site is Lavrio.

== History ==
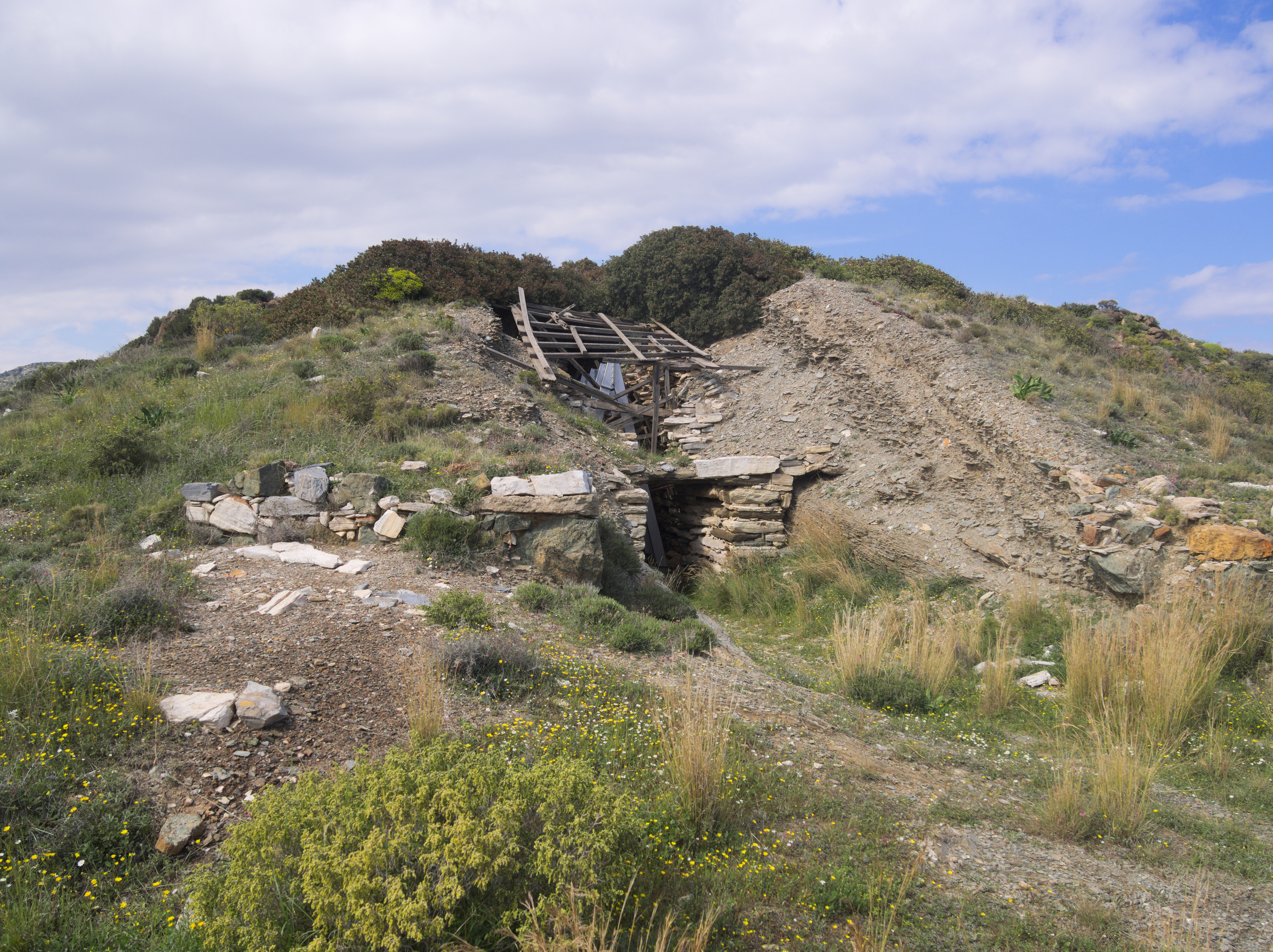
Tholos tomb A

The site was inhabited from the Neolithic Age (4th millennium BC). Thoricus was the mining centre of the Laureotica. There is evidence of lead extraction from the Early Helladic period (3rd millennium BC) and of silver (now exhausted) from 1500 BC. Mycenaean tholos tombs (15th century BC) and a Late Mycenaean installation (12th century BC), probably connected with the mines in the area, have been uncovered. The finds are housed in the National Archaeological Museum, Athens.

It continued to be a place of importance during the flourishing period of Athenian history, as its existing remains prove, and was hence fortified by the Athenians in the 24th year of the Peloponnesian War. It was 60 stadia away in distance from Anaphlystus upon the western coast.

There were significant town walls and a postern. The town's harbour was to the south of the acropolis; the island of Makronisi (Macri) provides natural protection. The settlement was destroyed by Sulla in 86 BC, and though it was reinhabited in Roman times, and visited by Pausanias, it was permanently abandoned in the 6th century's disorders.

== In myth ==
Thoricus, in the Homeric Hymn to Demeter (probably 7th century BC) is mentioned by the goddess, who is disguised as an old woman, as her landing place when she had been unwillingly brought from Crete. Thoricus directly faces Crete to the south, across the open Aegean Sea. Thoricus is celebrated in mythology as the residence of Cephalus, whom Eos (Roman Aurora) carried off to dwell with the gods. It has been conjectured by Christopher Wordsworth, with much probability, that the idea of Thoricus was associated in the Athenian mind with such a translation to the gods, and that the "Thorician stone" (Θορίκιος πέτρος) mentioned by Sophocles, respecting which there has been so much doubt, probably has reference to such a migration, as the poet is describing a similar translation of Oedipus. Cephalus is also said to have died at Thoricus.

== Remains ==
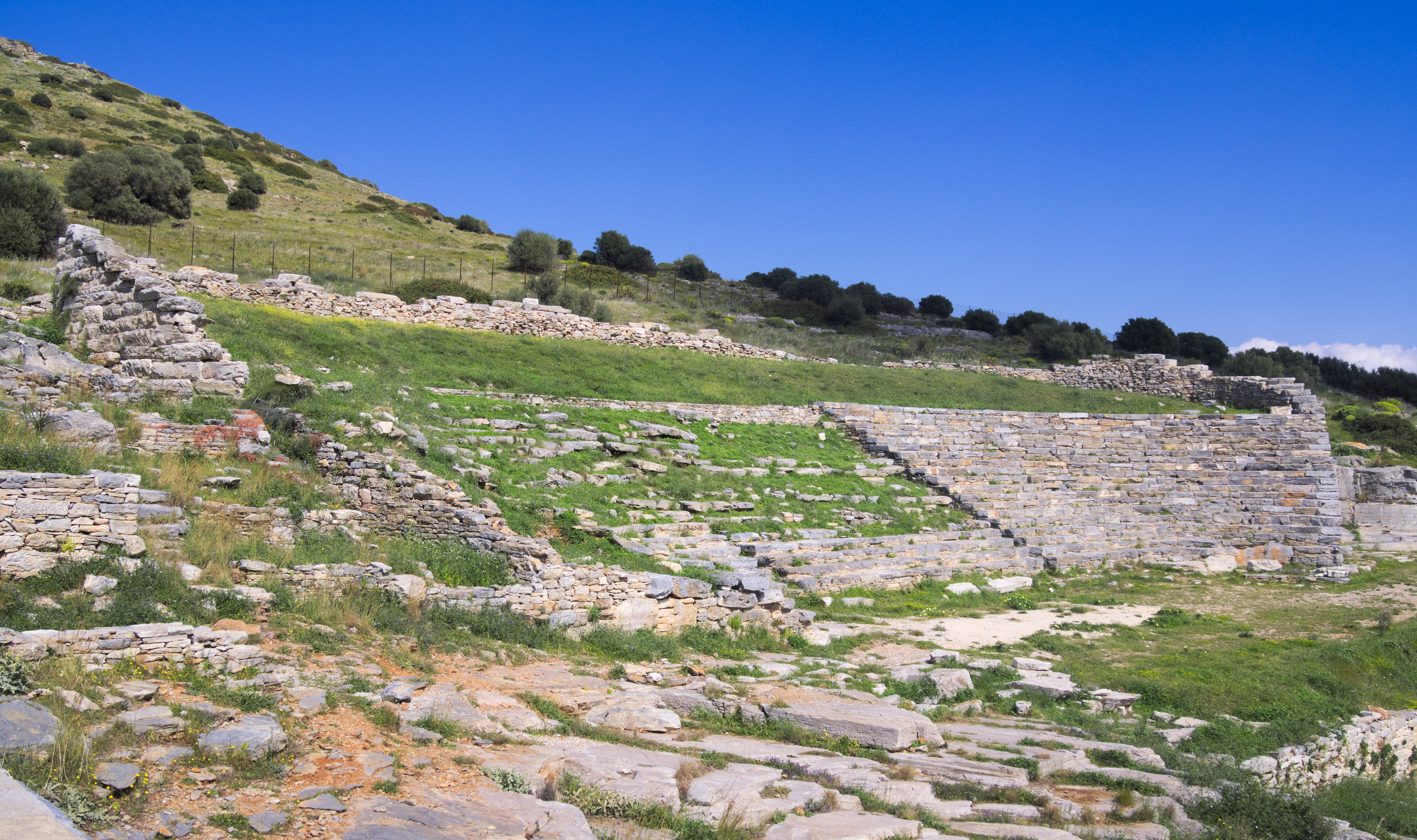
Ancient Greek theatre of Thorikos

Floor plan of the Double Stoa at Thorikos

The ancient city's centre and its acropolis are on Velatouri hill and the theatre (c. 525–480 BC) is a significant survival. The town was closely packed with irregular building of houses and smiths' workshops (many dating from the 7th–4th century BC). A small temple, perhaps dedicated to Hygieia, next to stoas with benches. There was an unusual Double Stoa built in the late 5th century BC. Inscriptions have identified the large Doric temple (late 5th century BC) as a telesterion for the cult of Demeter and Kore, the "Maiden" her daughter Persephone. The temple was initially explored by the Society of Dilettanti of London in 1817. In April 1886, Walter Miller conducted the first modern excavation of the site, seeking the theatre. Modern archaeology here has been largely connected with the Belgian School in Athens.

== See also ==
- List of ancient Greek cities
