= Bedesten of Larissa =

Ottoman enclosed market in Larissa, Greece

Coordinates: 39°38′29.4″N 22°24′57.0″E

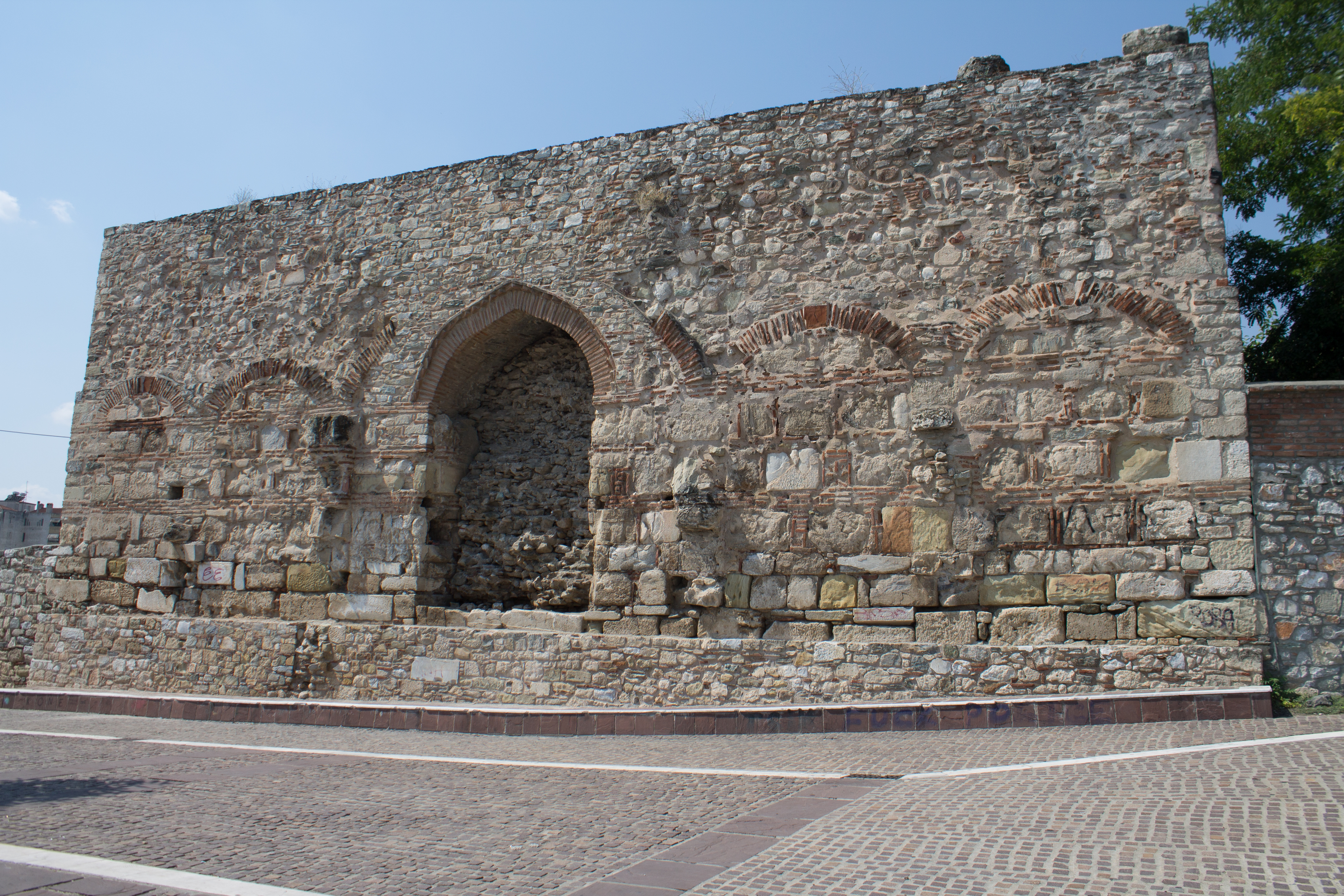
Outer view of the bedesten (2016)

The bedesten (Greek: μπεζεστένι, romanized: bezesteni) is an Ottoman enclosed market (bedesten) in the city of Larissa, Greece.

The bedesten is located on the top of the Frourio Hill, the city's ancient acropolis, and was erected in the late 15th century. The earliest written testimony about its existence is in a register from 1506, where it is listed among the pious foundations of Gazi Ömer Bey.

It is an orthogonal building, whose southern, eastern, and western sides are decorated with monumental pointed arches. Its dimensions are 27 × 18 m. The entrance was through a low gate on the northern side, leading to a small room, probably used as a treasury. This room was topped by six lead-covered domes, supported by two massive pillars. Nineteen shops were located in vaulted rooms located around the central courtyard, mostly dealing in cloth and valuables. Until its destruction by fire in 1799 it served as the city's commercial heart, along with the adjacent open-air market and bazaar. the 17th-century traveller Evliya Çelebi mentions the building, describing it as a "veritable fortress" and likening it to a citadel. Indeed, the Frourio ("Fortress") hill received its name from the bedesten.

In the 19th century it was used as a gunpowder magazine. Today only the outer walls survive, and only the southern entrance is open. Prior to the opening of the Diachronic Museum of Larissa in 2015, it was used to house the local Byzantine antiquities collection.
