= Achillius of Larissa =

Christian saint (died 330)

Saint Achillius of Larissa
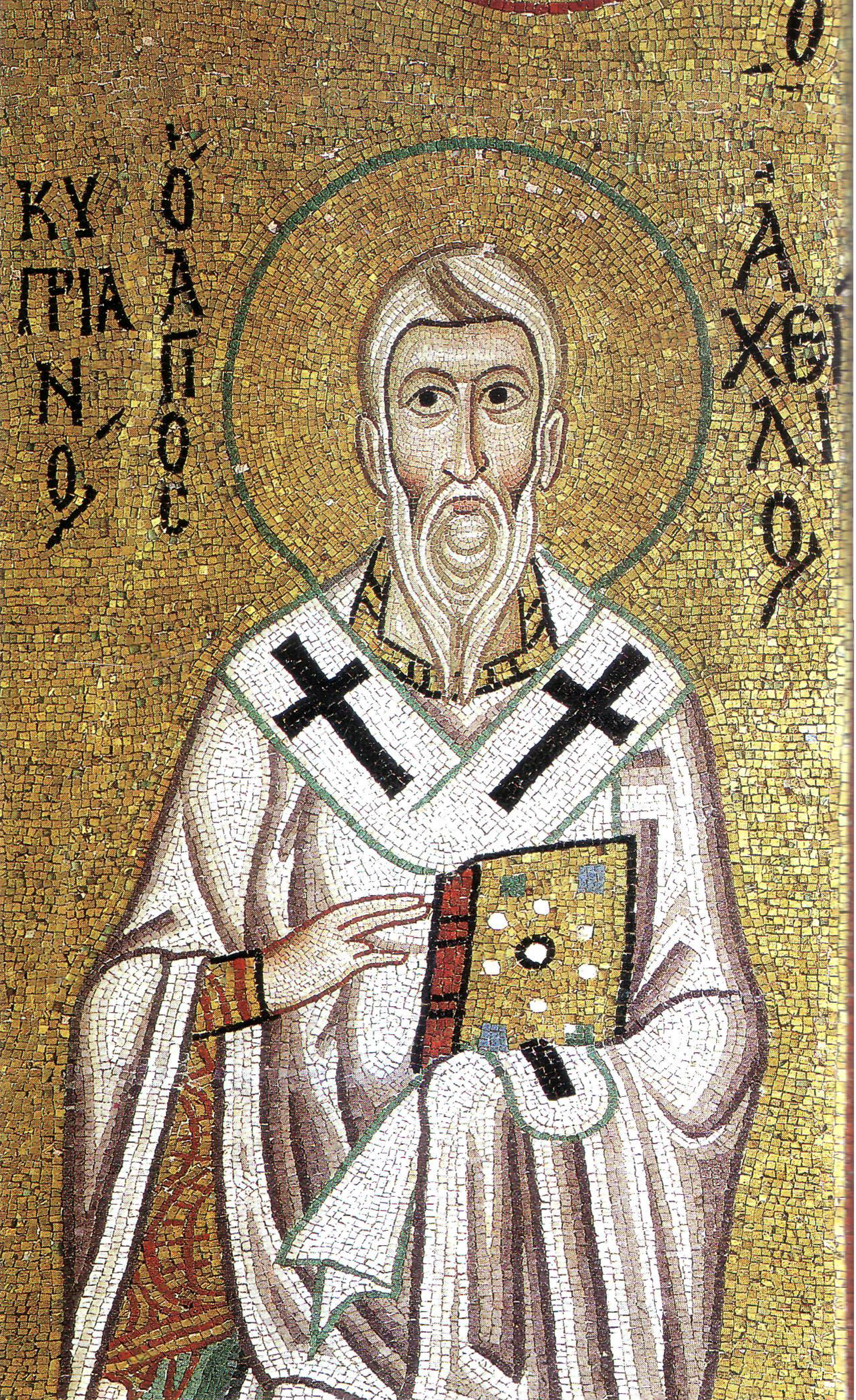
- Mosaic in Hosios Loukas

Bishop of Larissa
- Born: 3rd century
- Died: AD 330; Larissa, Thessaly
- Venerated in: Eastern Orthodox Church; Catholic Church
- Major shrine: Island of St. Achillius in Small Prespa Lake, Greece
- Feast: 15 May
- Patronage: Larissa

Saint Achillius of Larissa, also known as Saint Achilles, Saint Ailus, Saintc Ahillas, or Saint Achilius (Greek: Άγιος Αχίλλειος, Ágios Achílleios) (died 330 AD), was a 4th century bishop of Larissa and one of the 318 persons present at the First Council of Nicaea. His feast day is on 15 May.

== Life ==
Achillius was metropolitan of Larissa in Thessaly, Greece. Achillius is mainly remembered for his vehement defense of orthodoxy during the Council of Nicea and a miracle he performed in testimony against Arianism.

Taking up a stone, Achillius called to the Arians: 'If Christ is a creature of God, as you say, tell oil to flow from this stone.' The heretics kept silent, amazed at this demand by St. Achillius. Then the saint continued: 'And if the Son of God is equal to the Father, as we believe, then let oil flow from this stone.' And oil flowed out, to the amazement of all.

Upon returning from the Council, Achillius is reputed to have "cast down many pagan temples, built many churches, [and] cast out many demons". The 1910 Catholic Encyclopedia makes issue to reference Achillius in its article about the bishopric of Larissa.

We must mention especially, St. Achilius, in the fourth century, whose feast is on 15 May, and who is celebrated for his miracles.

== Veneration ==
Achillius died in Larissa in the year 330. When Samuel, Emperor of Bulgaria, conquered Thessaly, he translated the relics of Achillius to Prespa, to an island in a lake that was subsequently named after the saint. A district of Larissa is called Saint Achellios after this saint.

== See also ==
- Saint Achillius Church in Serbia
- Basilica of St. Achillios in Larissa
