= Diachronic Museum of Larissa =

Archaeological museum in Greece

Coordinates: 39.618056°N 22.393333°E

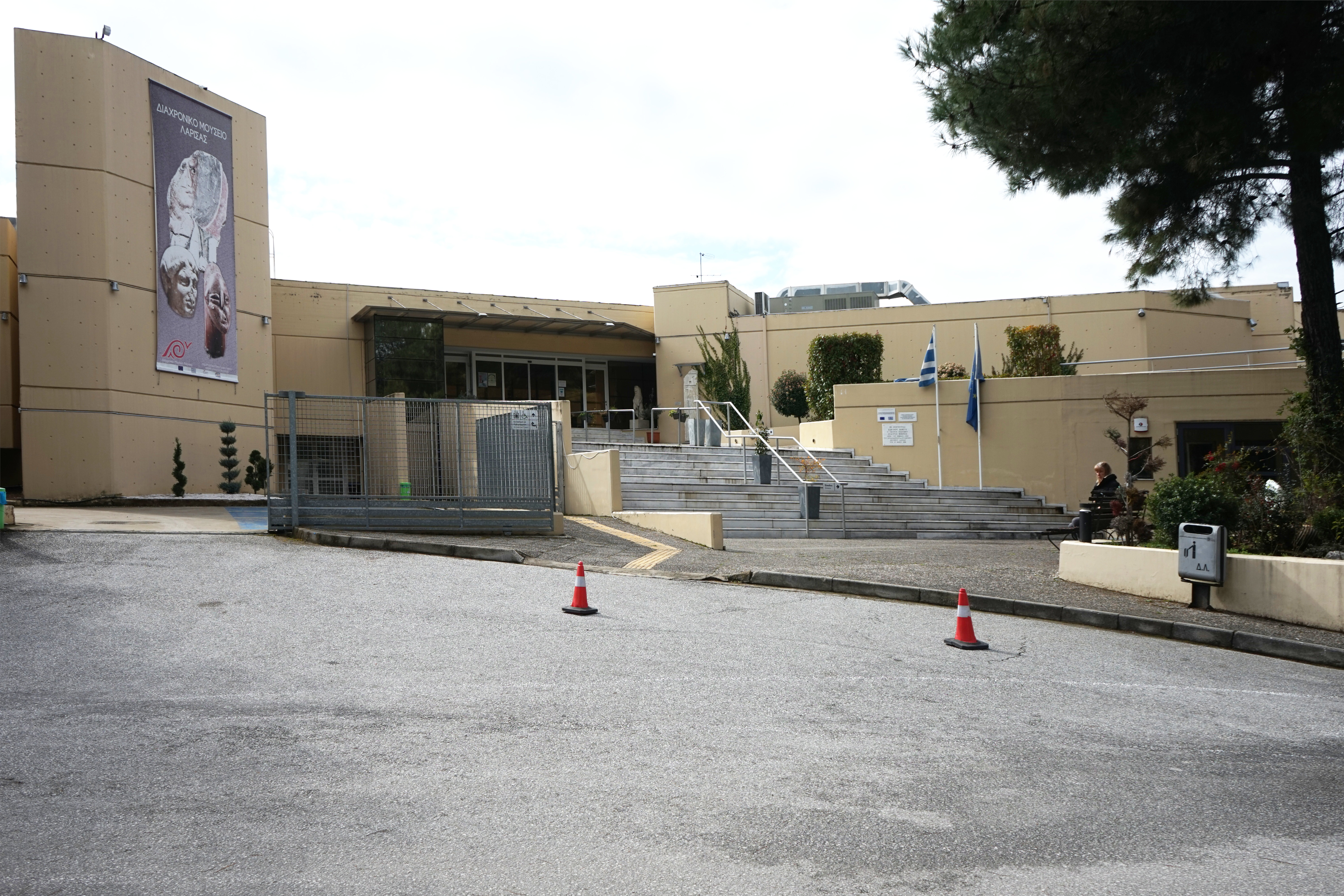
Diachronic Museum of Larissa

The Diachronic Museum of Larisa (Greek: Διαχρονικό Μουσείο Λάρισας) exhibits findings from the regional districts of Larissa, Trikala and Karditsa.

== Location ==
The museum is located on the southeastern outskirts of Larissa on Mezourios Hill.

== The Building ==
In 1984 an architectural competition for the construction of the museum was announced, which was won by the architect P. Fotiadis. The construction works began in 1996 and were completed in 2006. The old archaeological museum, which was housed in a mosque in the city center, closed in 2012. After the exhibits were moved, the museum opened to the public on November 28, 2015. The complex consists of three buildings, ranging from two to four floors. The total floor area is 11,750 m^{2} (126,500 sq ft).

- The first building houses the reception, a 100-seat amphitheater, rooms for events, a gift store and a café.
- The second building houses the offices of the Ephorate of Prehistoric and Classical Antiquities of Larissa.
- The museum itself occupies the main part of the whole complex. Attached to the exhibition area, besides storage rooms, are workshops for the treatment and conservation of paintings and murals, stone and marble, ceramics and glass, metals and mosaics.

=== Arrangement of the finds ===
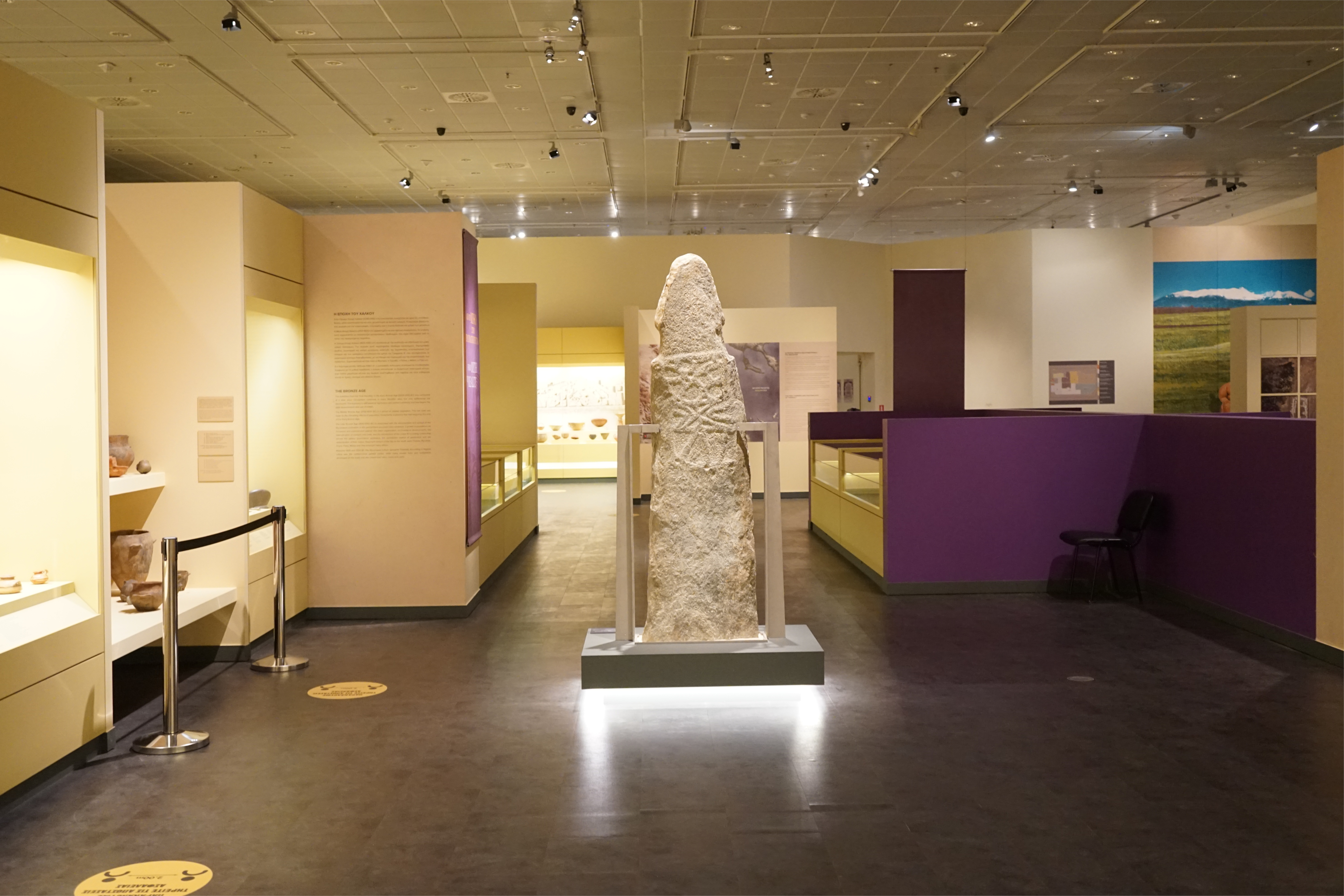
The Exhibition

- Prehistoric era
- Neolithic Era
- Bronze Age
- Archaic and Classical Period
- Hellenistic and Roman Period
- Early Christian Period
- Byzantine period
- Era of the Ottoman domination

== Important finds ==
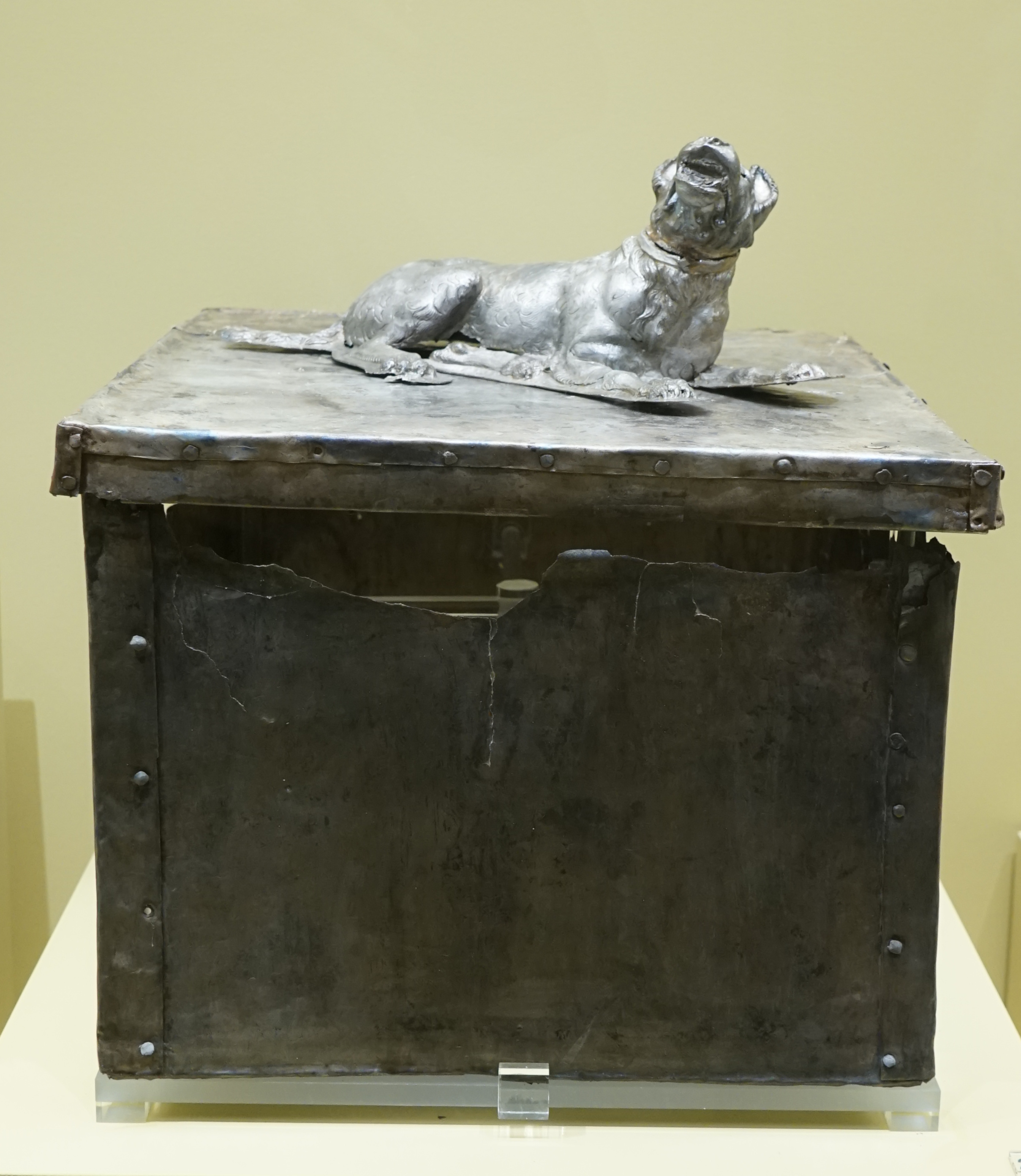
Larnax

- Animal bones and tools from prehistoric times.
- Well-preserved ceramic and glass finds
- Coins, including two golden Persian dareikoi
- An urn from the Archaic period inscribed with letters from a Thessalian alphabet
- Metal larnax guarded by a dog
- Mosaics from the early Christian and Byzantine periods
- Icons and epitaphs

== Literature ==
- The Return of the Muses, catalog of parts of the exhibition. Publisher: Ministry of Culture and Sport, Larissa Ephorate of Antiquities, Metropolis of Larisa and Tirnavos, Metropolis of Elassona, ISBN 978-960-386-506-3
