= Theatre of Thorikos =

Oldest still standing theatre in world

- Αρχαίο Θέατρο Θορικού (Ancient Greek)
- Theatre of Thoricos, Theatre of Thoricus
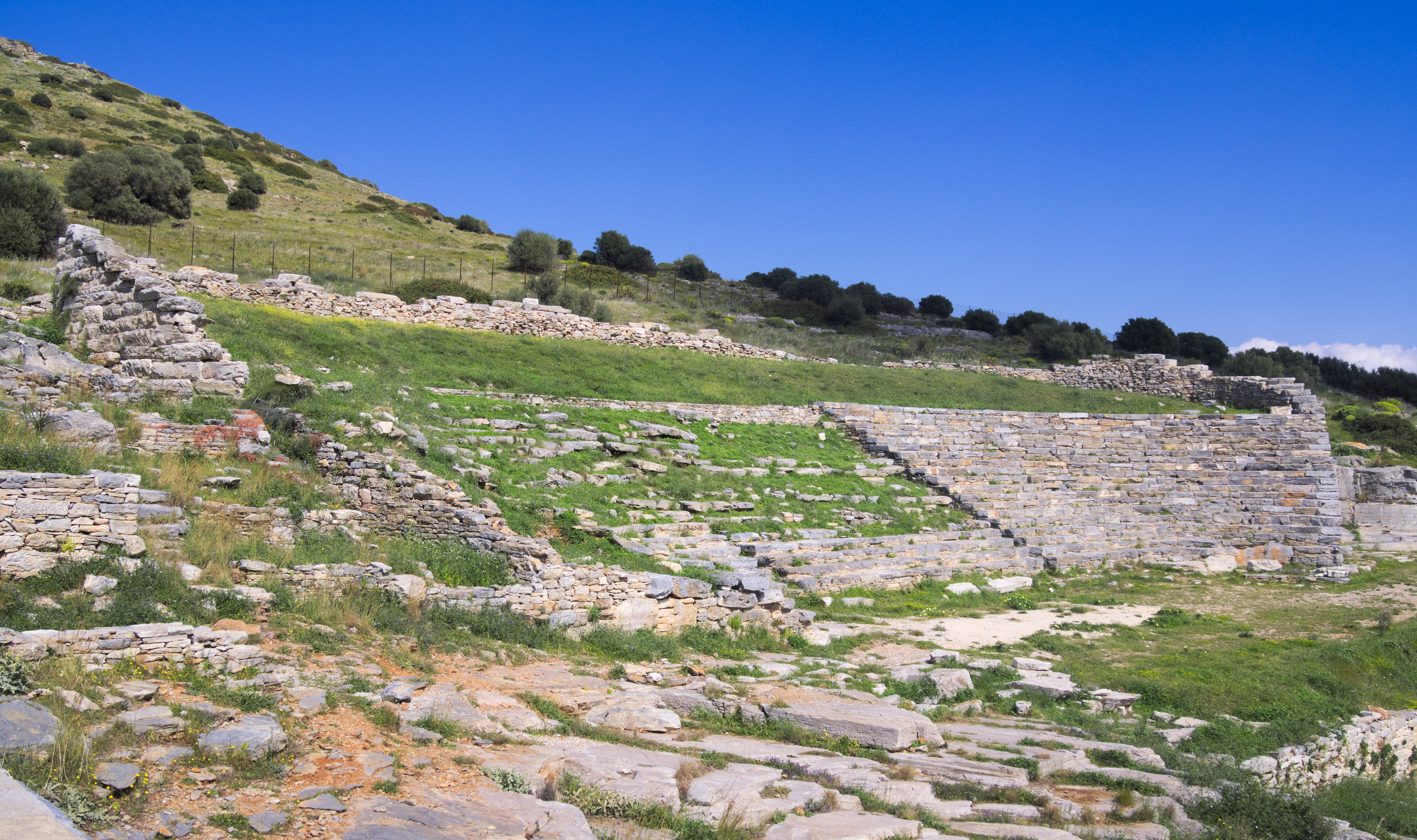
- View of the ancient theater.

- Location within Greece
- 37°44′17″N 24°3′13.500″E
- Type: Theatre
- Satellite of: Athens
- Location: Thorikos, Attica, Greece
- Region: Attica

History
- Built: 7th/6th century BCE

Site notes
- Condition: Ruined
- Owner: Public
- Public access: Yes
- Website: https://athensattica.com/things-to-see/ancient-sites/thorikos-theatre

The Theatre of Thorikos (Greek: Αρχαίο Θέατρο Θορικού), situated north of Lavrio, was an ancient Greek theater in the demos of Thorikos in Attica, Greece. It holds the distinction of being the world's oldest known theater, dating back to its construction around 525–480 BC. The theater is unusual in its design, as it is elongated instead of the typical semicircle.

== History ==
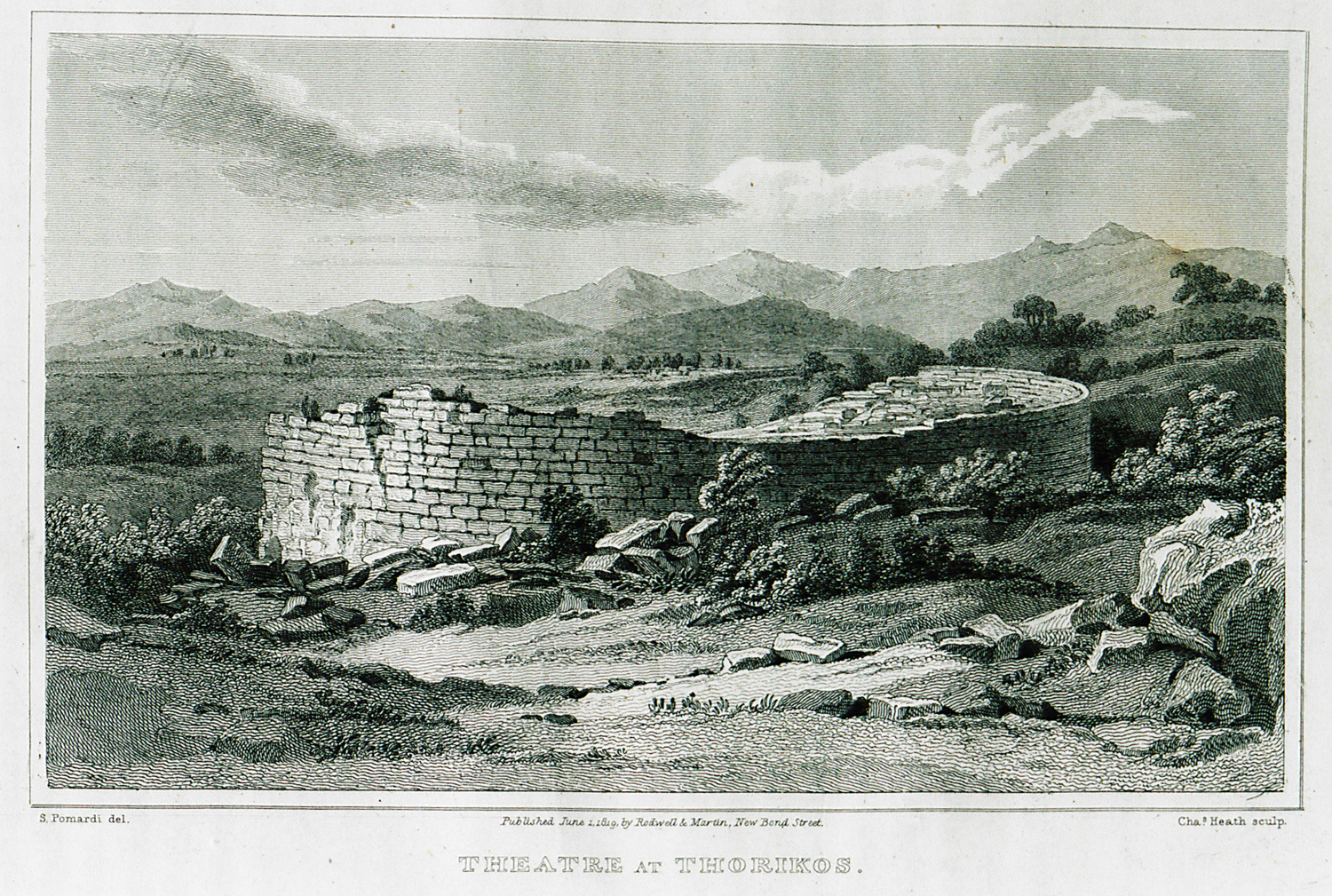
Theatre of Thorikos in 1819

The theater was not exclusively designed for theatrical performances, since it also served as a venue for gatherings and meetings among the citizens of Thorikos.

Enhanced through multiple construction phases, the Thorikos Theatre stands as a remarkable testament to the development of ancient Greek architecture. The initial construction phase was completed around 525–480 BC, at the ending of the archaic period. Its antiquity characterizes it as a primitive Greek structure, solidifying its distinction as the world's oldest surviving theatre.

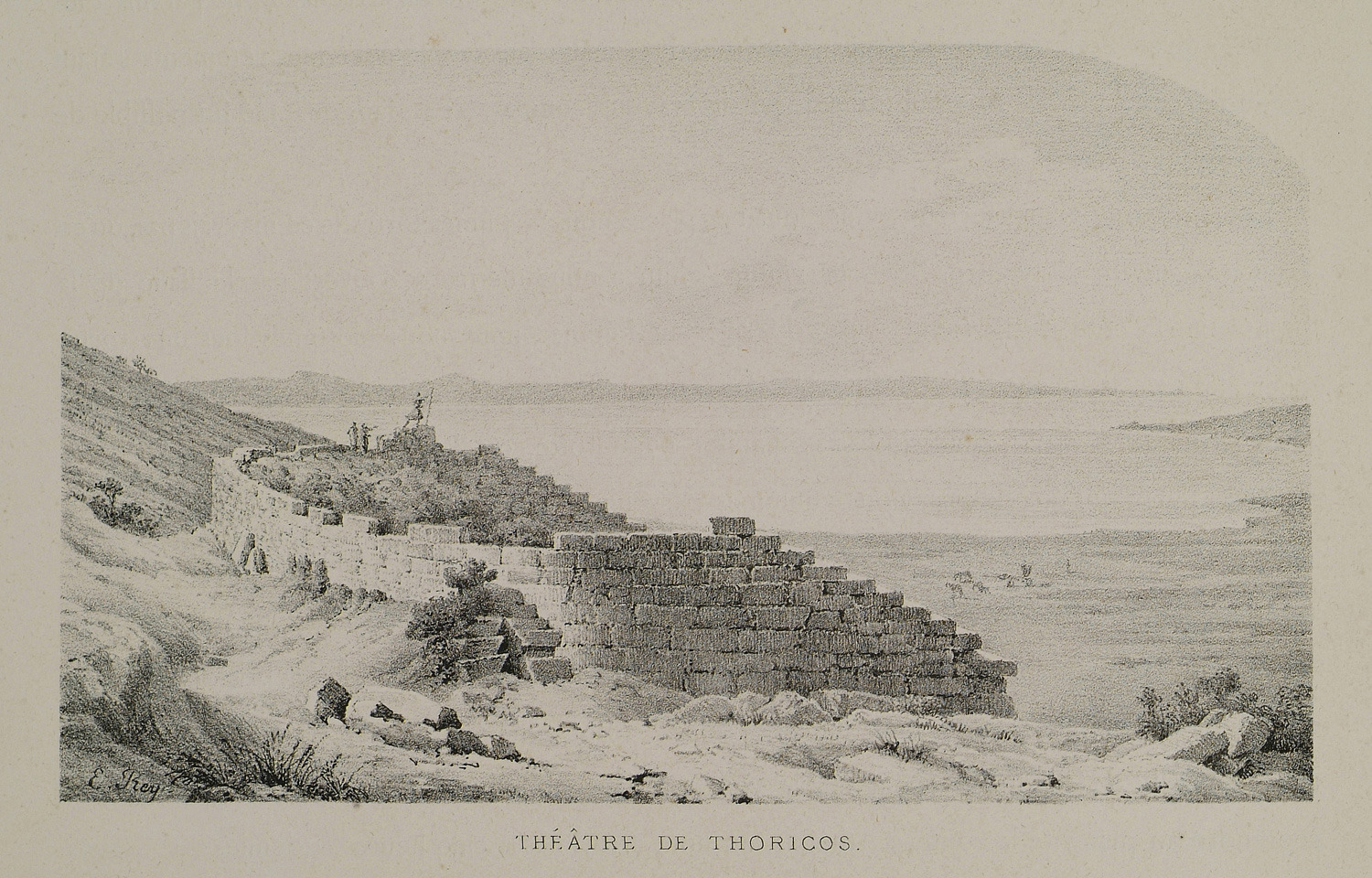
Theatre of Thorikos in the 1840s

The shape of the theater can be attributed to the fact that it was constructed entirely at a time when the standardized form of theaters had not yet been established. In recent times, the peculiar shape is also believed to result from multiple expansions that have been added to the theater's seating, with some overlaying the original arrangement. The theater became elongated when it was expanded in the classical period of the 4th century BC, halfway between changes were made to it as early as 300 BC. The American School of Classical Studies at Athens conducted archaeological excavations on the theater in 1886.

== Structure ==
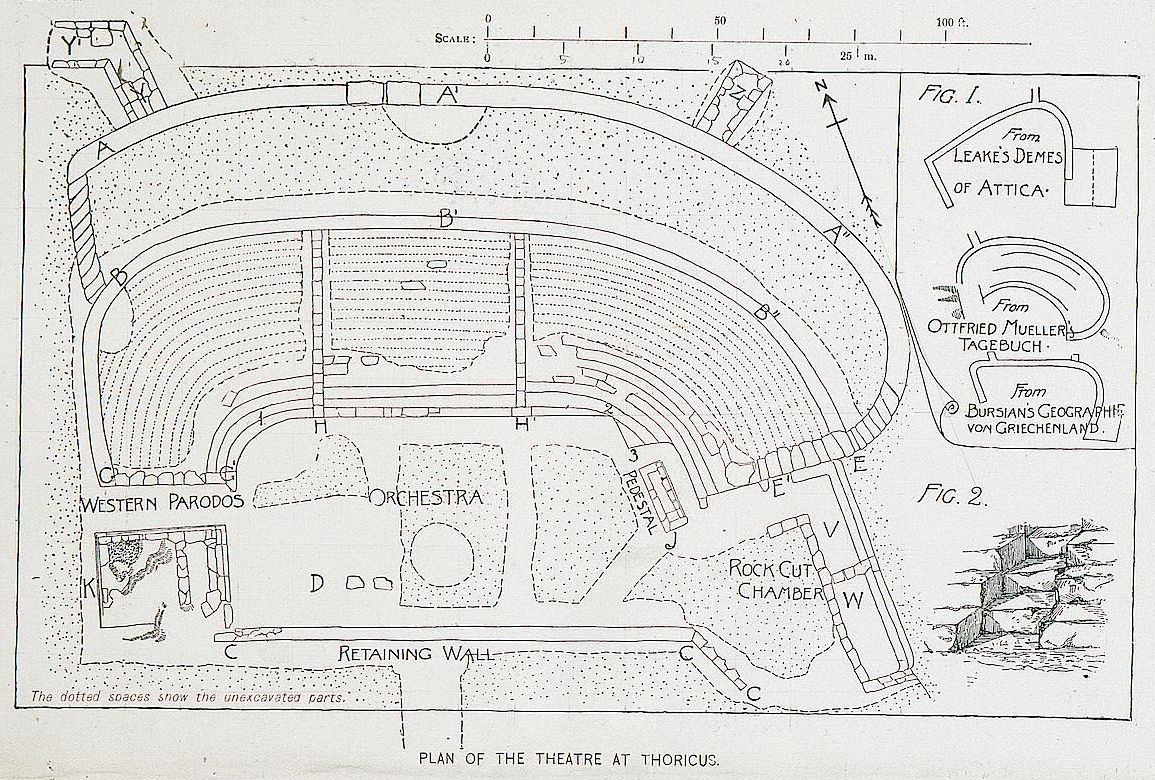
Plan of the Theatre of Thorikos as it was in 1888

The ruins of the theater are located on the southern slope of the hill known today as Velatoúri. The theater stand is elongated in the middle and curves at both ends. It opens towards the southwest and its width is about 55 meters. The theater's orchestra is oval in shape and measures approximately 16 × 30 meters or approximately 443 square meters.

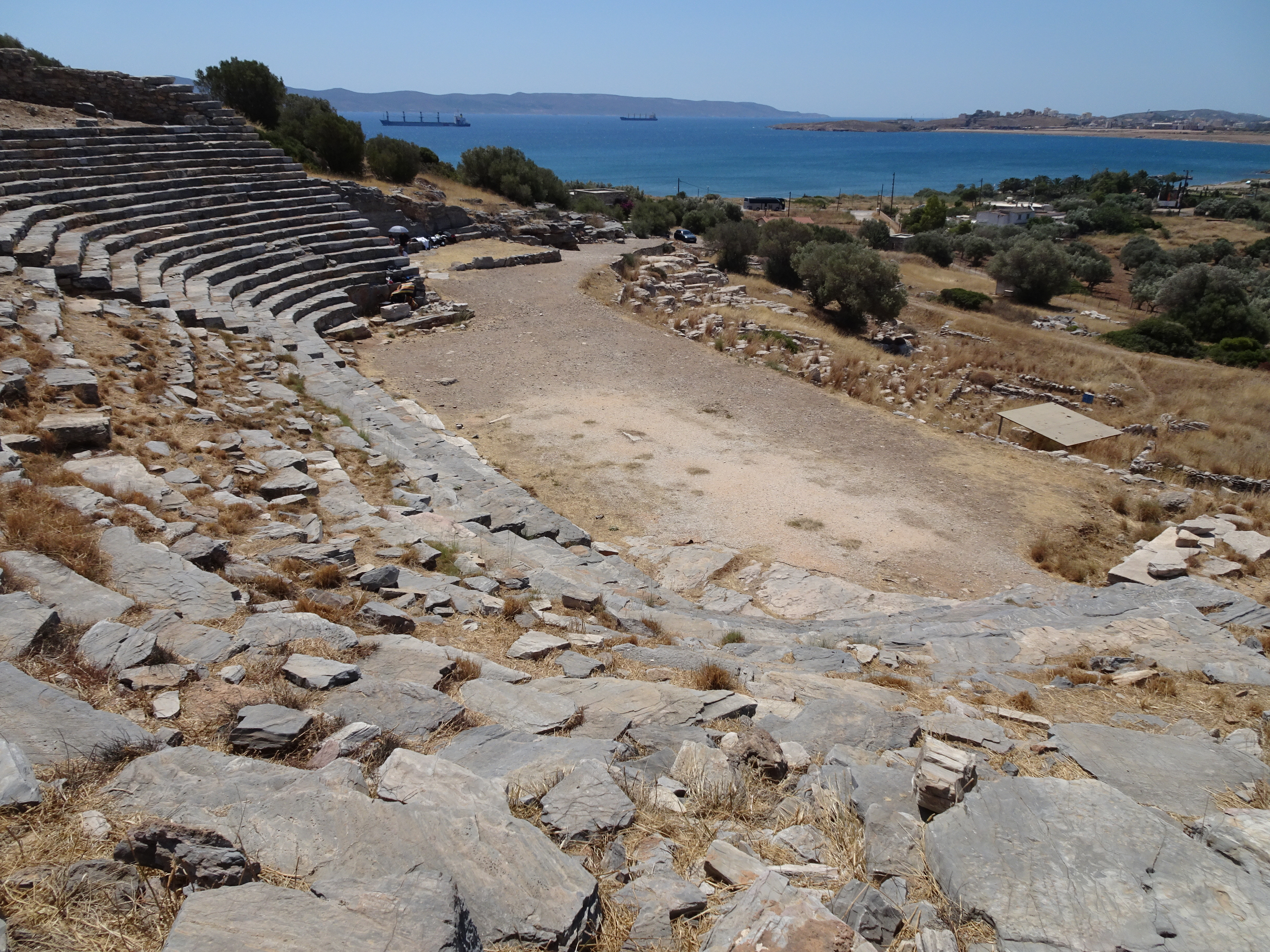
View of the theatre from the top

The theatre was built with limestone from the ancient quarry located near the it. In the first phase of construction, the theatre had about 19-21 straight rows of stone benches, with a retaining wall on the north side. Two vertical staircases divided the auditorium into three sections of different sizes. The benches in the middle of these are almost diagonal. In the middle of the 400s BC, curved sections were added to the east and west ends of the original gallery. In the 300s BC, further curved rows of benches were added to the rear of the gallery, above the earlier retaining wall. This section may have had wooden benches and some 11-12 rows of benches, or alternatively it may have been seated on the ground. A new retaining wall was built on the north side of the extension. It had two entrances, providing access from the north side of the theatre to the upper part of the auditorium. A single raised walkway led from the slope to the west side, while a bridge formed the east side access road. At the final stage, the theatre could accommodate between 2 000 and 3 200 spectators.

== See also ==
- Ancient Greek architecture
- Theatre of ancient Greece
- Ancient Greece
- Hellenic historiography

== Bibliography ==
- Walter Miller: The Theater of Thorikos. Preliminary Report. In: Papers of the American School of Classical Studies at Athens 4, 1885/86 (1888), S. 1–19 (Digitalisat).
- William Cushing: The Theater of Thorikos. Supplementary Report. In: Papers of the American School of Classical Studies at Athens 4, 1885/86 (1888), S. 23–34 (Digitalisat).
- Tony Hackens: Le théâtre. In: Herman F. Mussche, Jean Bingen, Jean Servais, Roland Paepe, Tony Hackens: Thorikos I 1963. Rapport préliminaire sur la premiere campagne de fouilles.. Brüssel 1968, S. 105–118.
- Tony Hackens: Le théâtre. In: Herman F. Mussche, Jean Bingen, Jean Servais, José de Geyter, Tony Hackens, Paule Spitaels, Achilles Gautier: Thorikos III 1965. Rapport préliminaire sur la troisième campagne de fouilles. Brüssel 1967, S. 75–96.
- Hermann F. Mussche: Das Theater von Thorikos. Einige Betrachtungen. In: Sacris erudiri Bd. 31, 1989, S. 309–314.
- Ione Mylonas Shear: Thorikos Attica, Greece. In: Richard Stillwell u. a. (Hrsg.): The Princeton Encyclopedia of Classical Sites. Princeton University Press, Princeton NJ 1976, ISBN 0-691-03542-3 (englisch, perseus.tufts.edu).
- Hermann F. Mussche: Das Theater von Thorikos. Einige Betrachtungen. In: Sacris erudiri Bd. 31, 1989, S. 309–314.
- Clairy Palyvou: Notes on the Geometry of the Ancient Theatre of Thorikos. In: Archäologischer Anzeiger 2001, S. 45–58 (Digitalisat).
- Andreas Kapetanios, Roald F. Docter: The Theatre. In: Roald F. Docter, Maud Webster (Hrsg.): Exploring Thorikos. Ghent University, Ghent 2018, ISBN 978-94-92944-39-9, S. 37–39 (Digitalisat).
