= Hellenistic theatre of Dion =

Ancient theatre in Dion, Pieria, Greece

Coordinates: 40.172316°N 22.491806°E

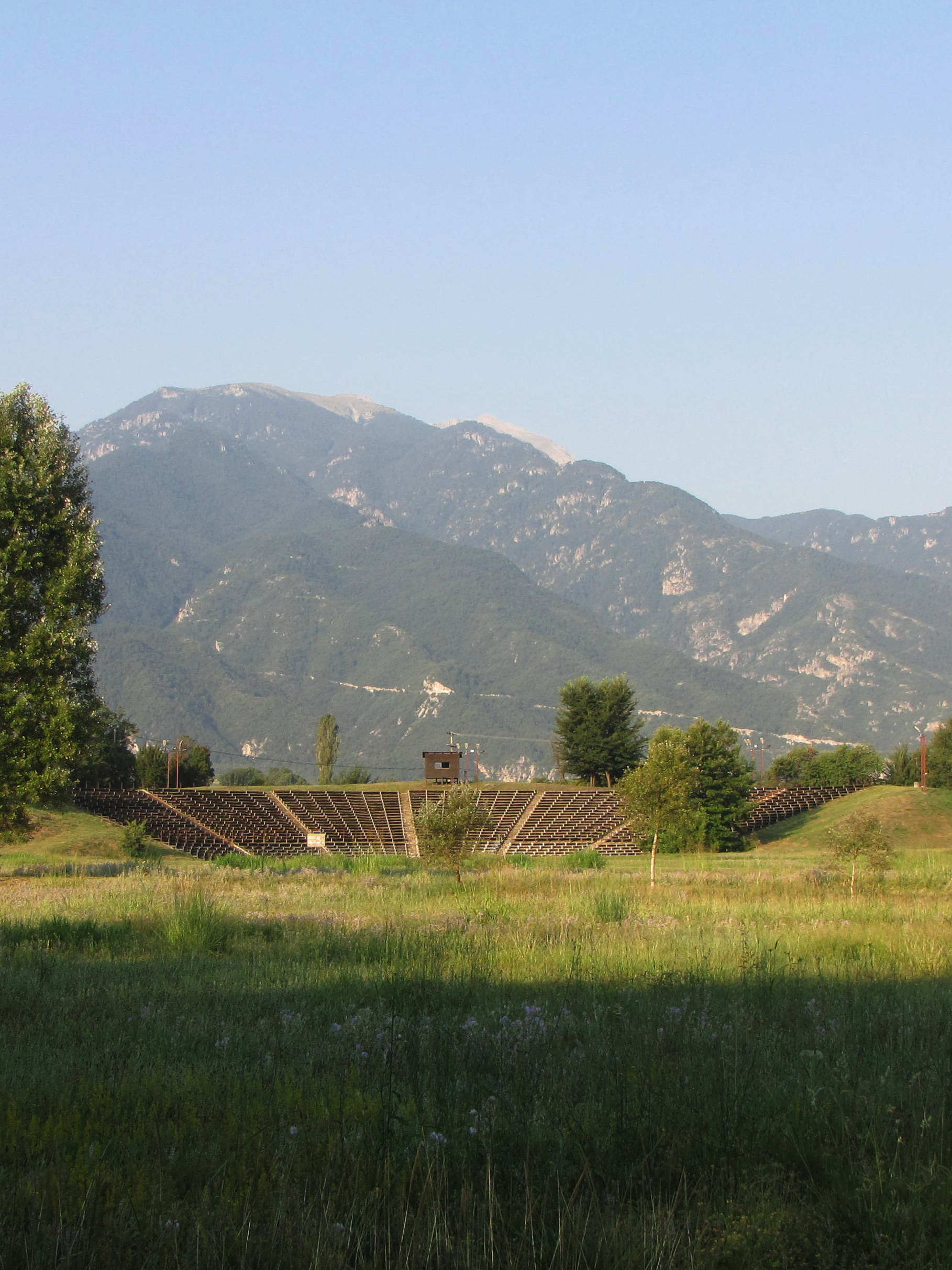
The Hellenistic theatre of Dion

The largest building of the Archaeological Park of Dion in northern Greece is the Hellenistic-era theatre. It is located in the south of the village of Dion, Pieria and is often used during the summer for performances of the Olympus Festival.

== Location ==
The theatre is located approximately 180 meters south of the entrance to the archaeological park.

== Method of construction ==
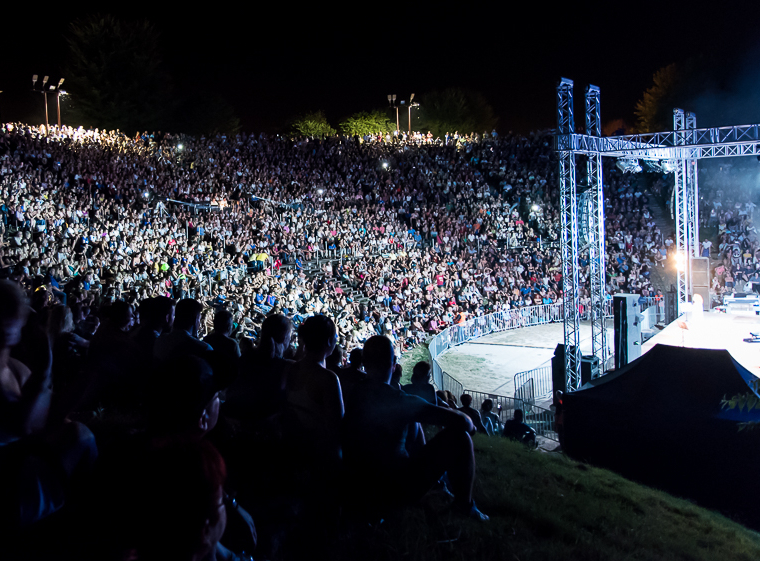
An event of the Olympus Festival at the ancient theatre

The form of the theatre corresponds to the typical theatre of Greek antiquity. It is an open-air structure that was built in a northeastern direction on the slope of a low, natural (partially heaped) hill. The orchestra was built on mashed soil and was surrounded by a drainage construction, to drain the rainwater. The drainage is uncovered, over two bridges it could be crossed by the actors. The orchestra has a diameter of about 26 meters. The stage was probably made of wood and was a bit higher than the current stage. Underneath the orchestra was an underground corridor, connecting two rooms.

Unique to Hellenistic theatres was the type of seats of the auditorium, the theatron; The semicircular rows of seats were covered with 50 by 50 by 7 centimeters of mud bricks, the seats were a half brick width high. Before the beginning of the Roman period, the seats were covered with marble. The current form of the theater is the result of a modern reconstruction on the antique foundations. The seats in the spectator area are now covered with wooden boards.

The gable of the theater building was adorned with a Doric entablature; the roof was covered with tiles in the Laconic style.

== History ==
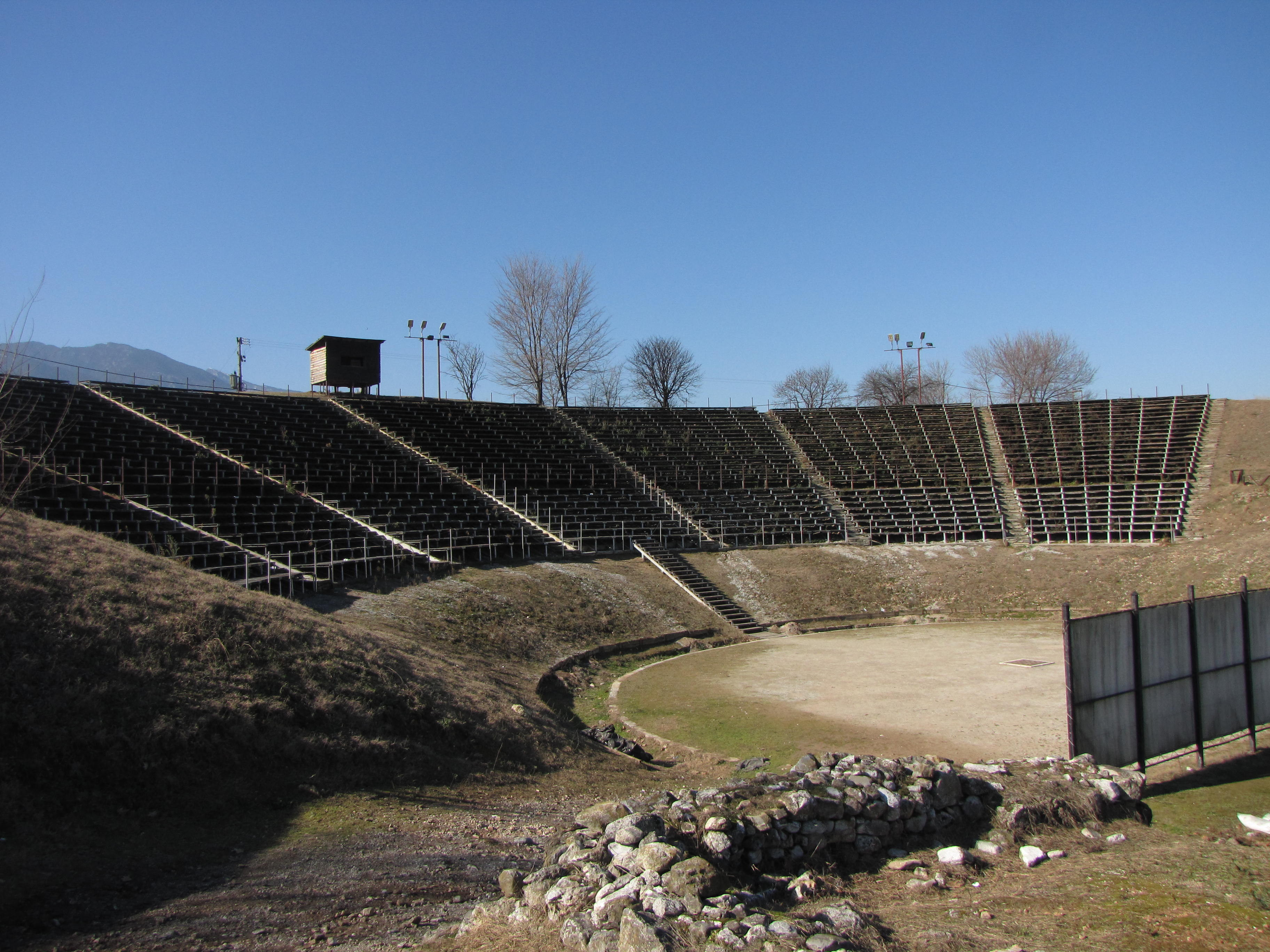
The Hellenistic theatre of Dion

King Archelaos held a nine-day festival in honor of the nine Pieric Muses, which also included theatre competitions. He invited Euripides to Dion, who wrote the plays of Archelaos and the Bacchae. Both plays were probably also performed in Dion.

The current theatre was built during the Hellenistic period, presumably during the reign of King Philip V. An earlier theatre occupied the same site, presumably destroyed during the assault of the Aetolian League, around 220 BC. Philip V immediately rebuilt the city of Dion, the shrines and the theatre. Within the structure was found a large quantity of coins depicting Philip V. In Roman times (from 168 BC) were removed useful building materials of the theatre and built a Roman theater near the sanctuary of Zeus.

After completion of renovation work, the theatre has been regularly hosting performances of the Olympus Festival since 1991.

== Excavation history ==
The theatre was discovered in 1806 by the English explorer William M. Leake. In 1855 the find was confirmed by the French archaeologist Léon Heuzey. The first test excavations were carried out in 1970 under the direction of Professor G. Bakalakis. The regular excavation work began in 1973 under the direction of Professor Pandermalis. After the works rested for two years, they were resumed in 1977 by the architect and archaeologist Professor G. Karadedos. Since the building in the Roman period, was not paid any further attention, its basic structure remained unchanged. The excavations were carried out very carefully; thus, valuable information was obtained to allow conclusions about the original condition of the complex. The orchestra, the stage, the drainage, parts of the theater building and the main part of the Cavea were found. After the excavations were completed in 1988, Karadedos implemented a study for the “Conservation, Promotion and Temporary Re-operation of the Hellenistic Theatre of Dion”.

== See also ==
- List of ancient Greek theatres

== Literature ==
- William Martin Leake, Travels in Northern Greece
- D. Pantermalis, Dion. Ausgrabungsstätte und Museum, 1997. (Δ. Παντερμαλής, Δίον. Αρχαιολογικός χώρος και μουσείο, εκδόσεις ΑΔΑΜ, 1997 (in German and English language)
- Hellenic Republic, Ministry of culture and sports, Onassis Foundation USA, 2016: Gods and Mortals at Olympus. Edited by Dimitrios Pandermalis, ISBN 978-0-9906142-2-7
