= Thymele =

Altar in ancient Greece and Rome

The thymele was an altar in ancient Greece and Rome, especially a small one dedicated to Dionysus and placed in the centre of the orchestra of the Greek theatres.

== See also ==
- Coeliades ramanatek, also known as Thymele ramanatek Boisduval, 1833: a species of butterfly
