= First Ancient Theatre, Larissa =

Ancient Greek theatre

Coordinates: 39°38′25″N 22°24′55″E

First Ancient Theatre of Larissa
- Α' Αρχαίο Θέατρο Λάρισας
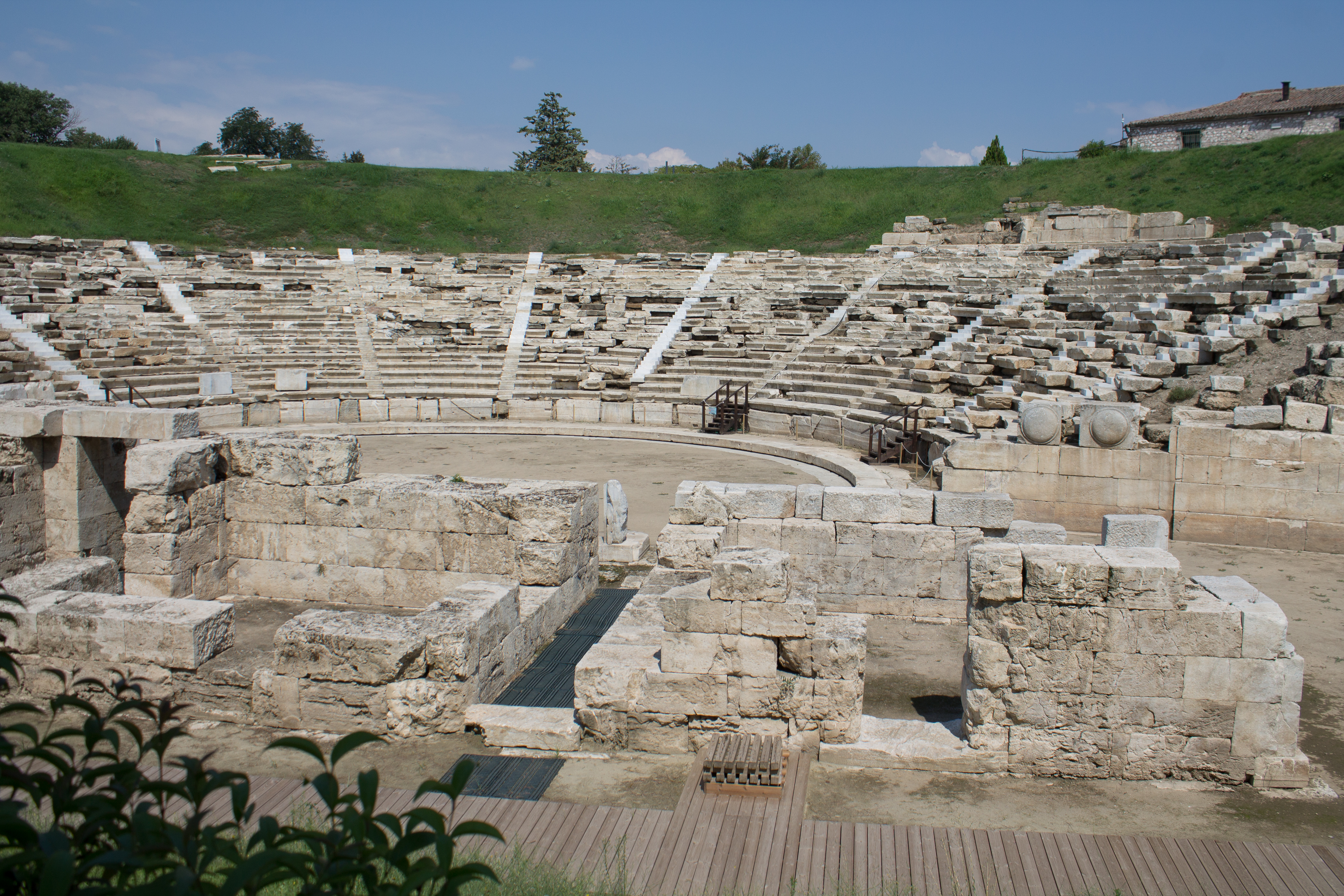

- Location within Greece
- Address: Mitropolitou Arseniou 10–12
- Location: Larissa
- Capacity: 10,000
- Type: Ancient Greek theatre

Construction
- Built: Early 3rd century BC
- Closed: 3rd/4th century AD
- Demolished: 7th century AD
- Builder: Antigonus II Gonatas

Website
- www.larissa-theatre.com

The First Ancient Theater of Larissa is an ancient theater and the largest theater in Thessaly, having a capacity of 10,000 people. It is located on the southern side of Frourio Hill in Larissa and it is a registered trademark of the city.

== History ==
The First Ancient Theatre of Larissa was built in the center of the ancient city of Larissa, during the reign of king Philip V of Macedon, towards the end of the 3rd century BC. The theatre was in use for six centuries until the end of the 3rd century AD (or the beginning of the 4th century AD) when its operation stopped abruptly.

During the first centuries, the theatre was used for two purposes: in addition to theatrical performances, it also hosted the meetings of the highest regional authority, the so-called Koinon of Thessaly. The ancient theatre of Larissa, from the end of the 7th century BC had the lead.

The ancient theatre was initially associated with the worship of the god Dionysus and the performance of theatrical and musical activities, and later with the administration of the koinon for the meetings of the city assembly, which was called agora. An indication of these is a small votive altar dedicated to the god Dionysus, found near the theatre where there were supposed sanctuaries and the names of the representatives of the city-state who participated in the Federation of Thessaly and who appear in the seats of the ancient theatre.

The theatre has the typical architecture of a theatre of the Hellenistic period, having the three basic elements: a koilon, an orchestra, and a skene (stage) with a diameter of about 25 meters. The koilon of the ancient theatre was formed by the slope of Frourio hill, which was shaped into terraces for the placement of the seats. During the reign of the emperor Augustus and his successor Tiberius, inscriptions on their honor were found on the brims of the stage.

== See also ==
- List of ancient Greek theatres
