= Paradise Metal =

2026 album by Father Dionysos Tabakis

Studio album by Father Dionysos Tabakis
- Released: 2026
- Length: 32:29
- Label: Heat Crimes

Paradise Metal is the debut album by Father Dionysos Tabakis, a Greek Orthodox priest. The album consists of experimental metal music. Heat Crimes released the album in 2026.

== Background ==
Fr. Tabakis lives in Nafplio, a small city in Argolis, Greece, and is married with children. He launched an experimental music channel on YouTube in 2012. As of May 2026, the channel has over 300 videos and over 12,000 subscribers.

In an interview with Lifo, Fr. Tabakis said, "Fortunately, I am not a professional musician because I would have the fear of performance. While, as a simple amateur, I travel lightly and carefree with my boat."

== Reception ==
Paradise Metal received a 7.6/10 score from Pitchfork, and was described in the review as a "joyous, solemn, playful, and painful record." Heat Crimes announced a limited edition vinyl release of the album, to come in July of 2026.
