= Mycenaean Revival architecture =

Revival architectural style, part of neoclassical revival in Greece

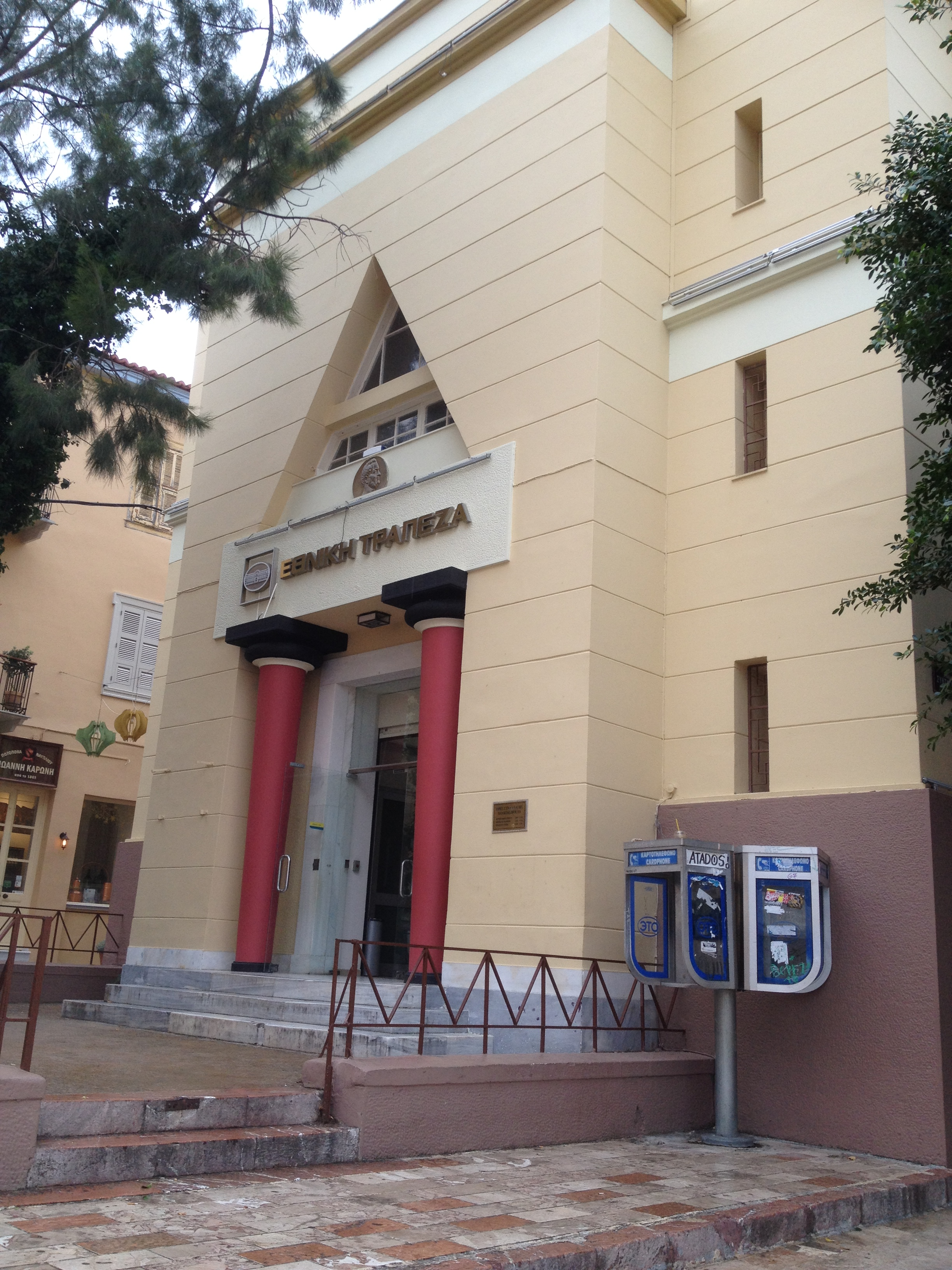
Entrance inspired by the Tomb of Clytemnestra

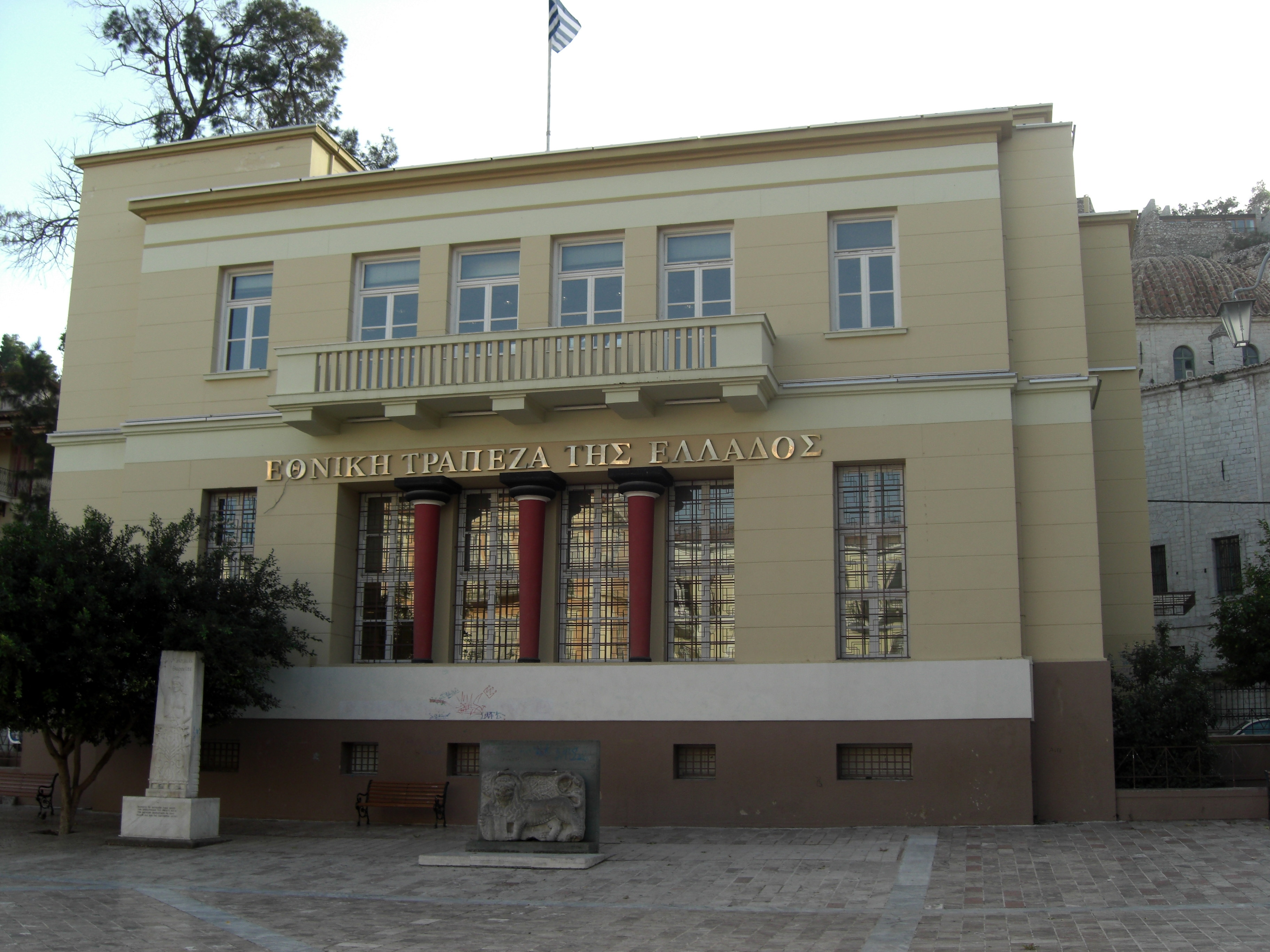
Side view with Minoan columns

Mycenaean Revival is a rare revival architectural style developed as part of the twentieth century neoclassicist architectural revival in Greece.

The National Bank of Greece in Nafplio, built near the heart of the Mycenaean civilization in the 1930s by the architect Nikolaos Zouboulidis, is built in Mycenaean Revival, or neo-Mycenaean style. The door of the bank is an evocation of the form of the Lion Gate and the Tomb of Clytemnestra at Mycenae. The form of the columns is copied from the column on the Lion Gate, and the building is painted in colors used at Mycenae.

The architectural style also incorporates elements of the Minoan architecture, especially showcasing the characteristic red columns, which are referred to as the "Minoan columns".
