= Nafplio =

City in Argolis, Greece

Nafplio Ναύπλιο
- Municipality
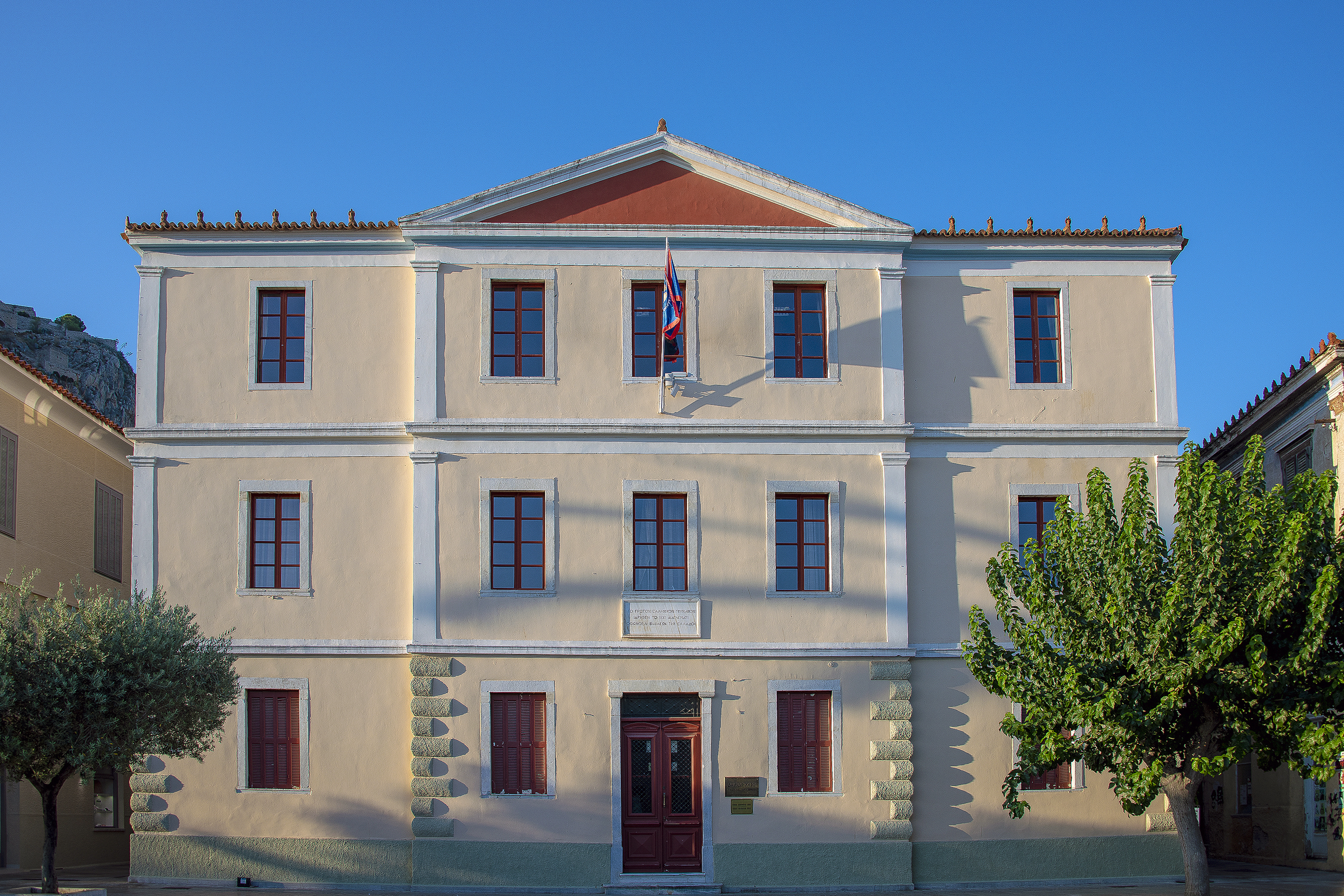
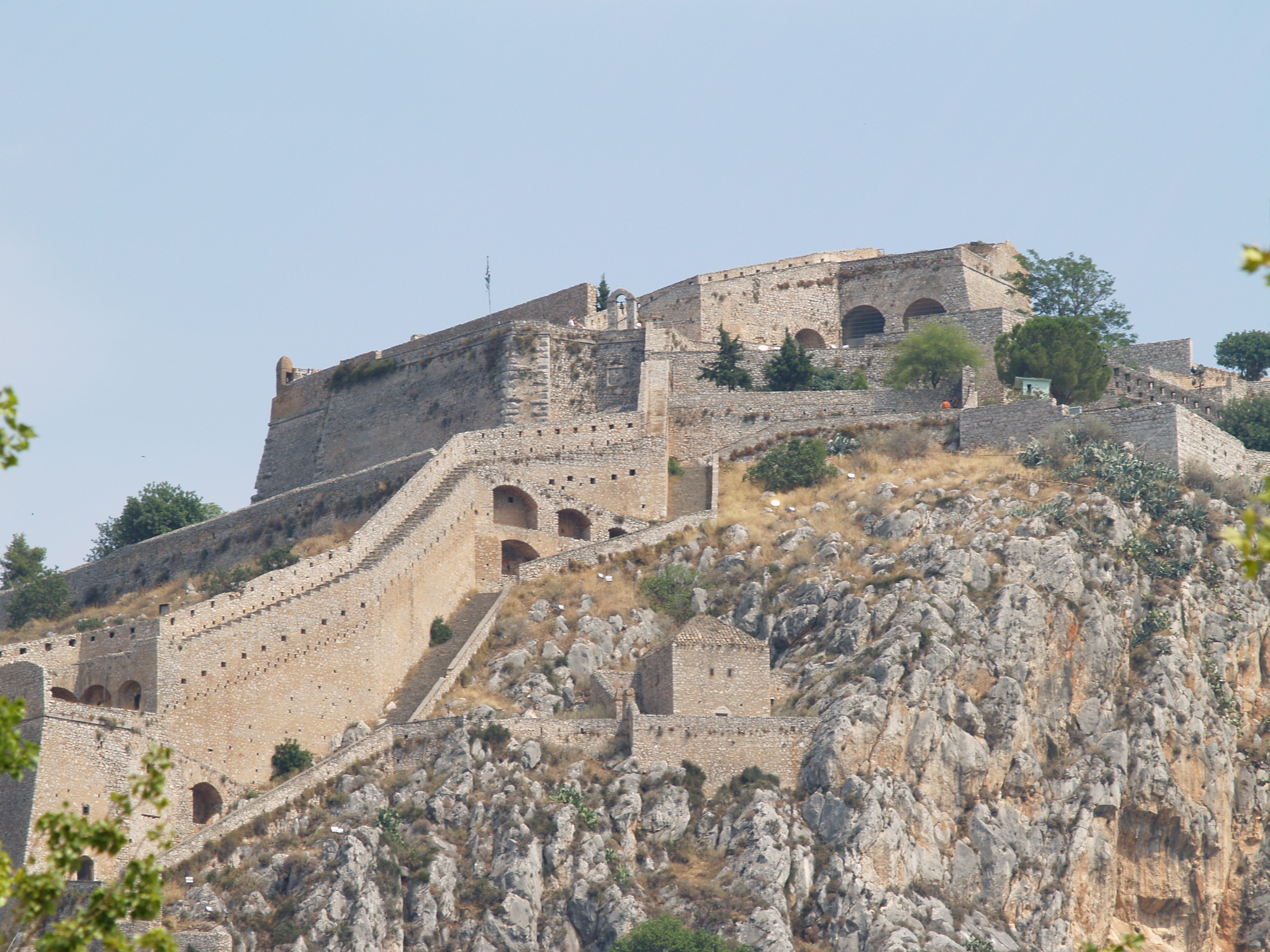
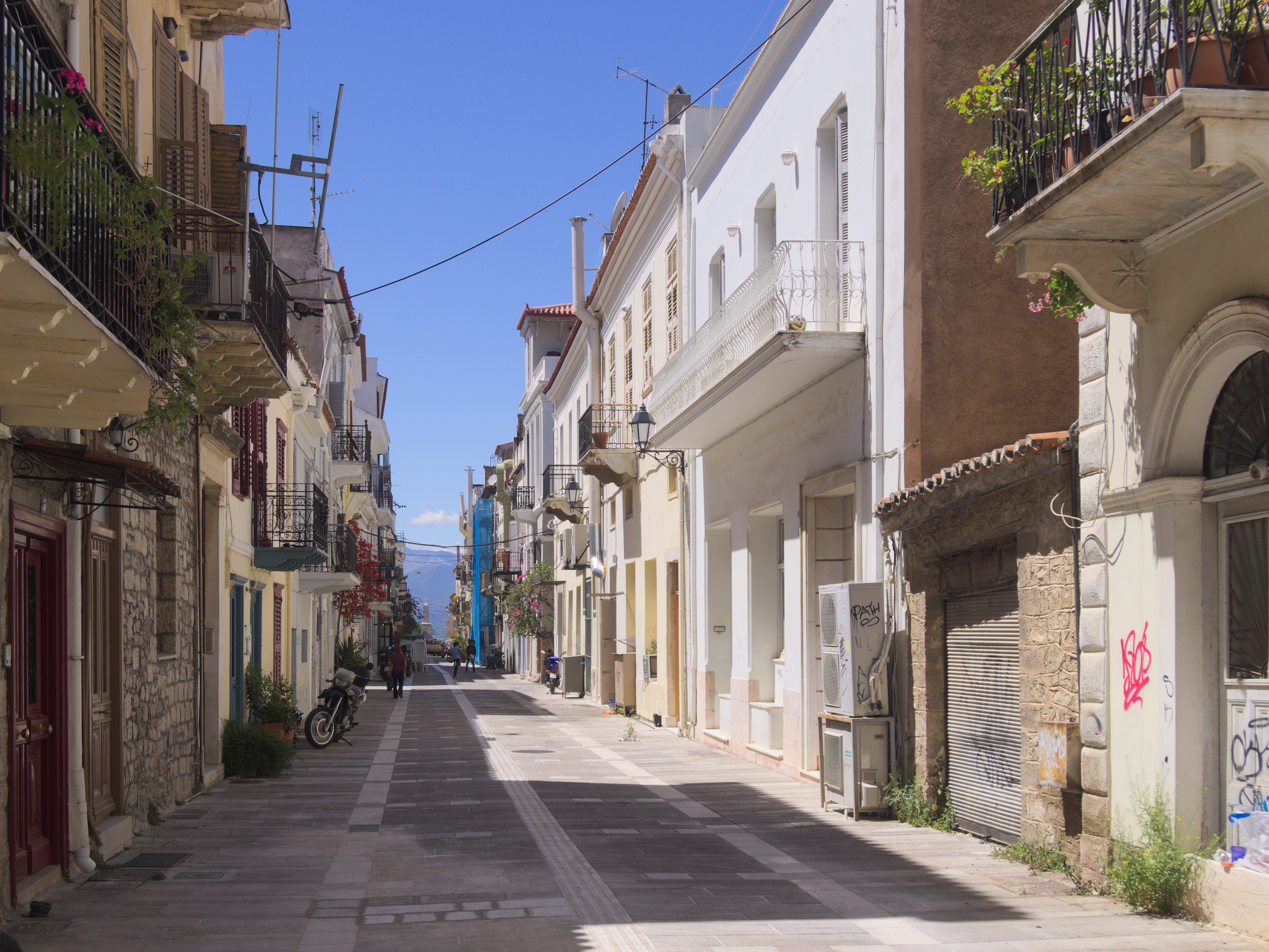
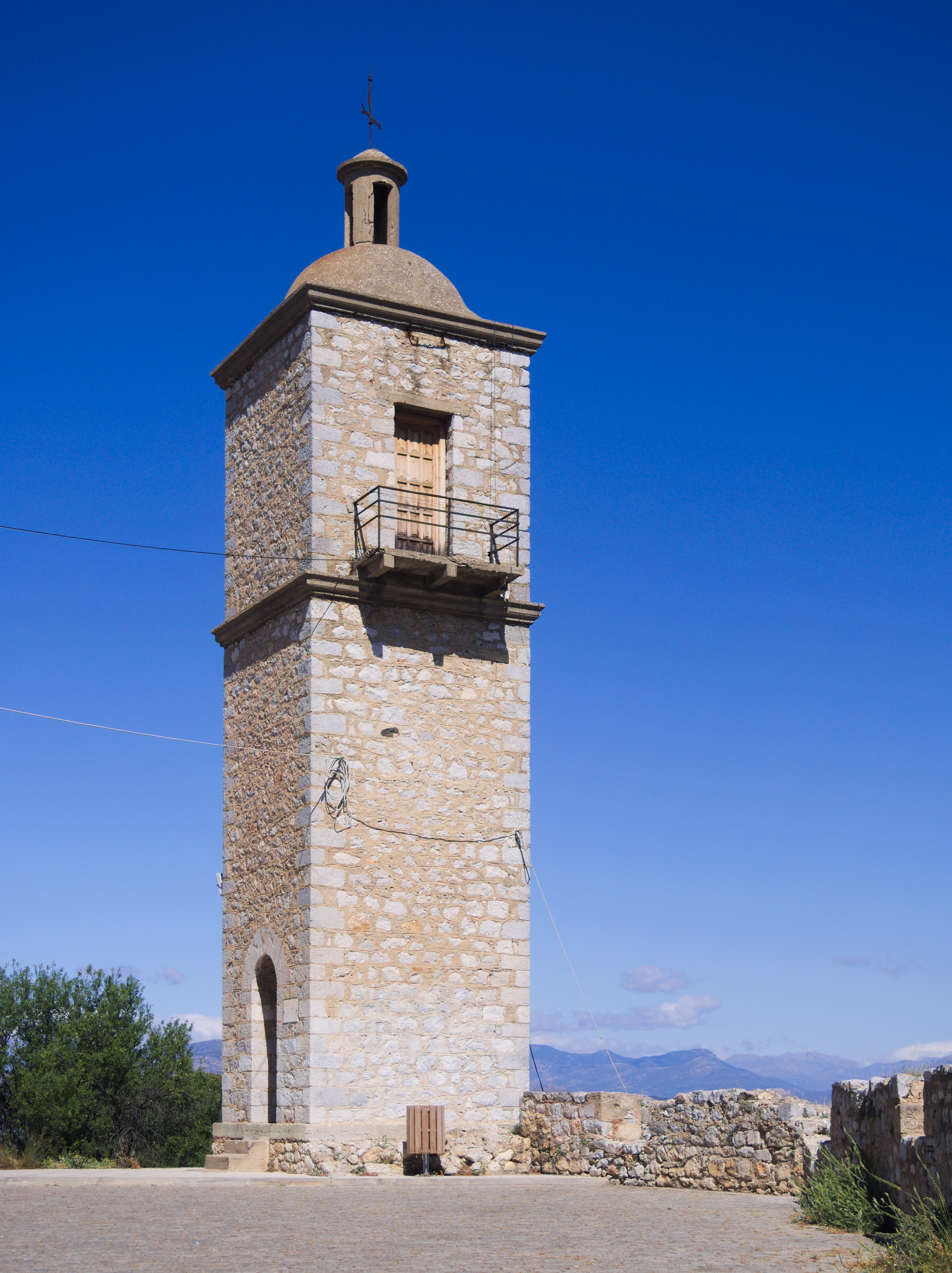
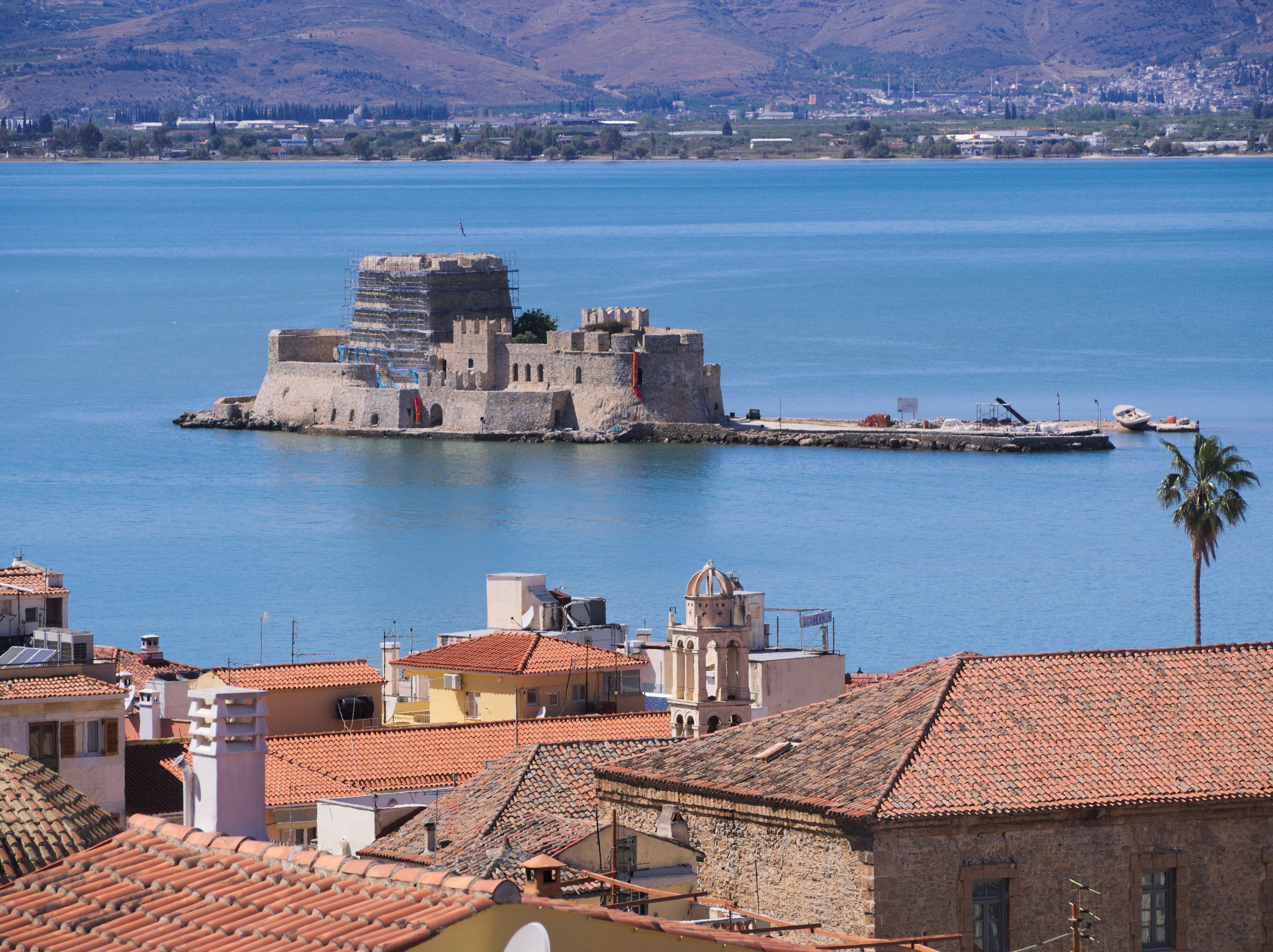
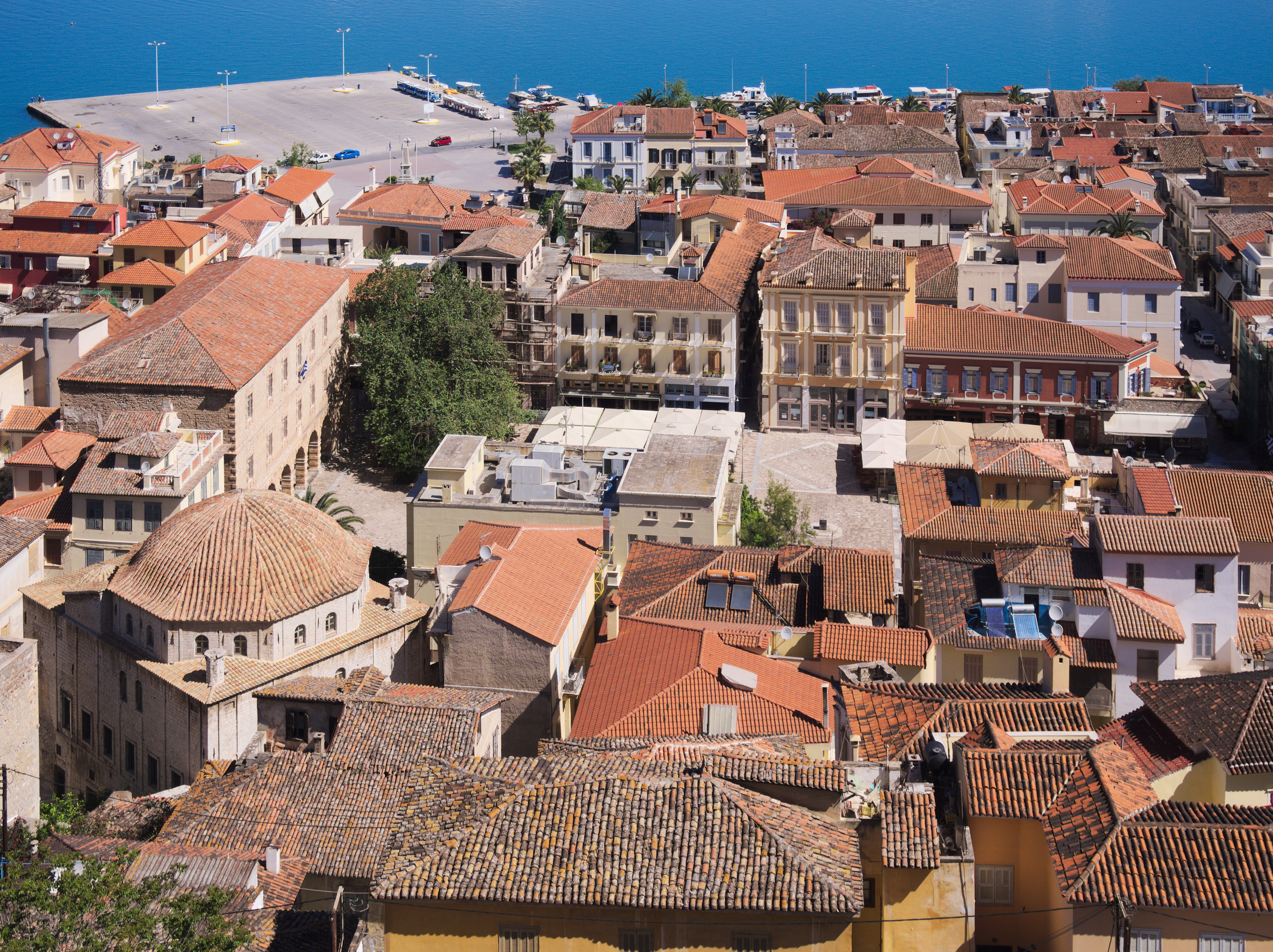
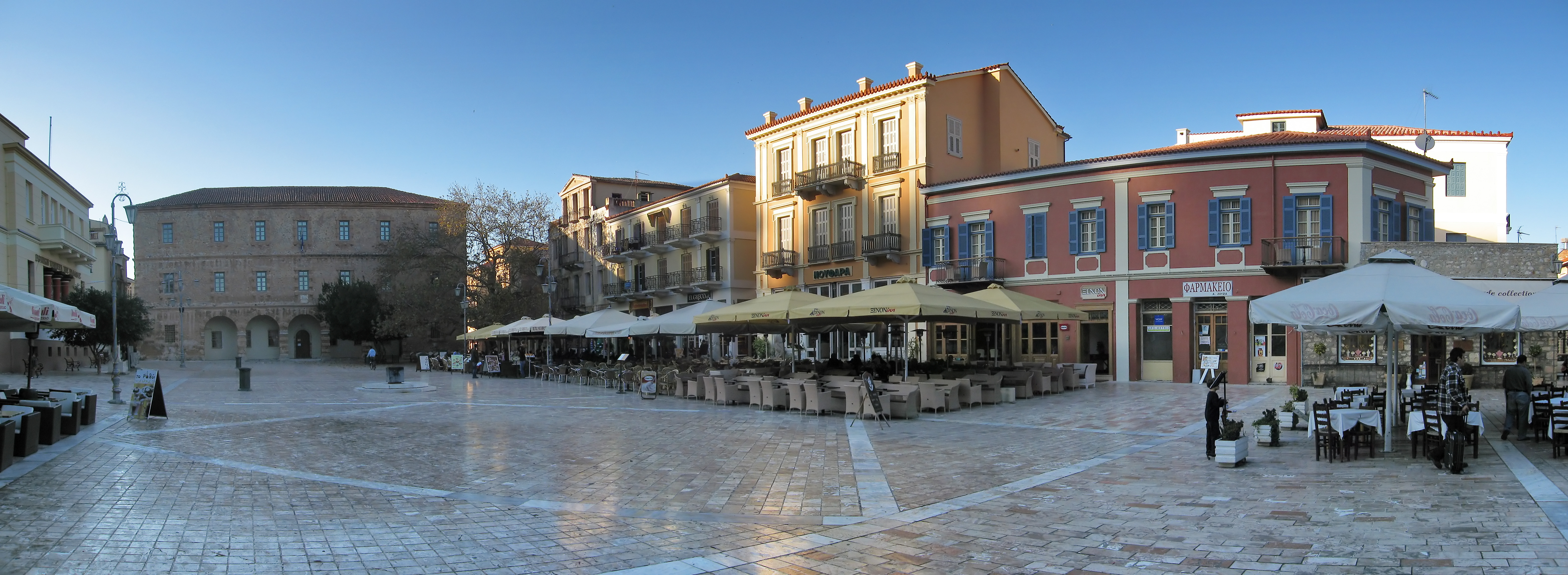
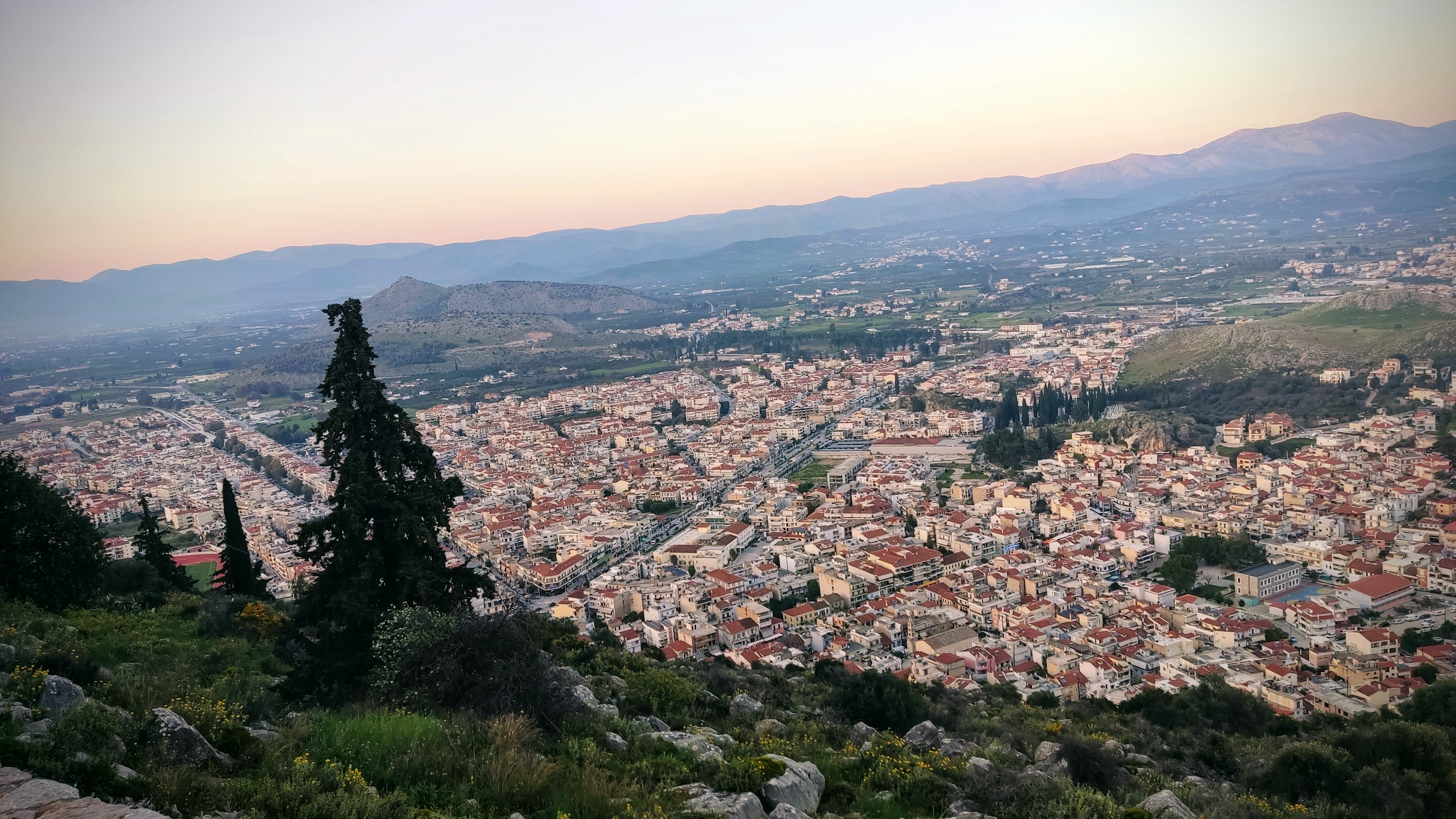
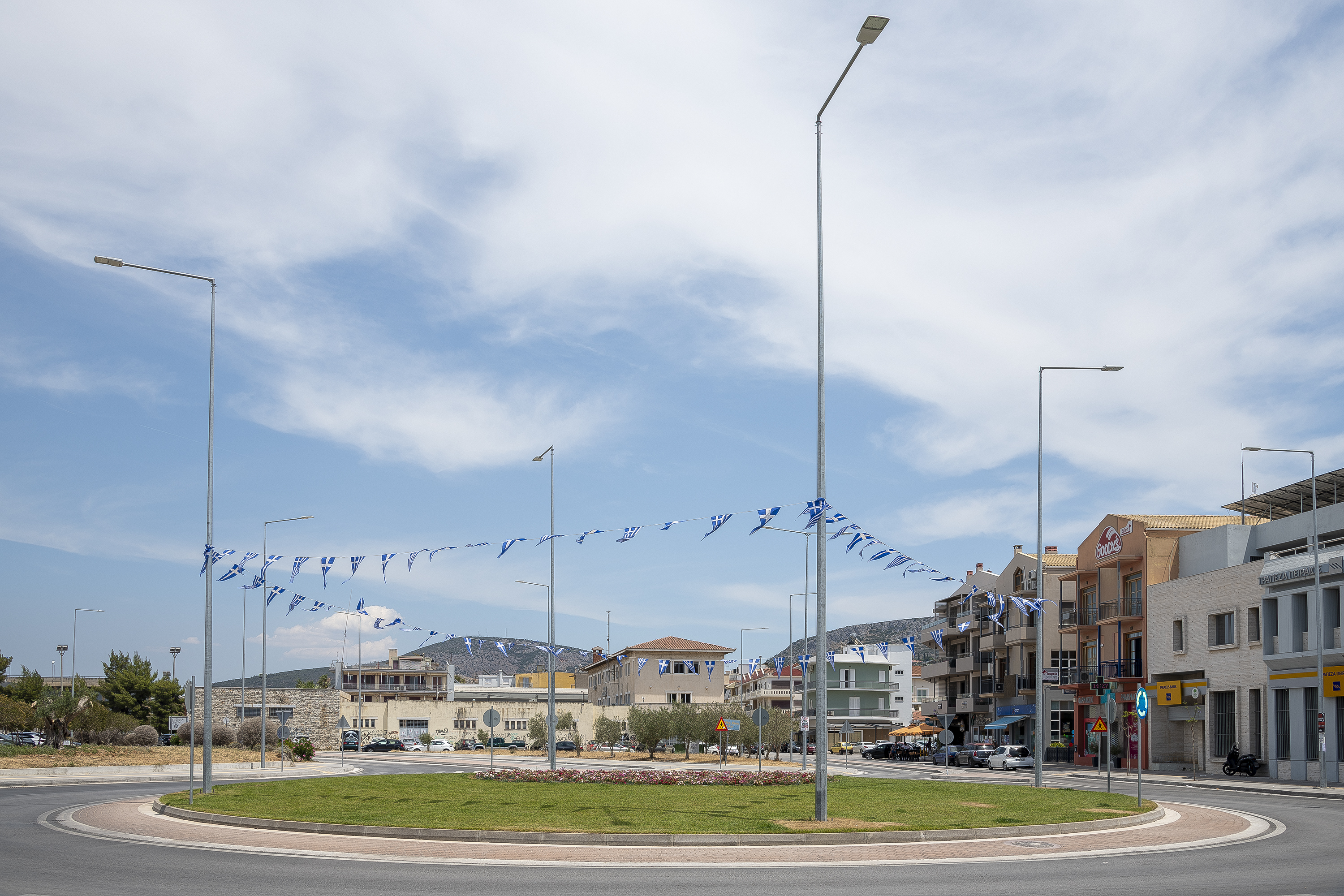
- Clockwise from top right: Palamidi Fortress, Acronauplia Clock Tower, Nafplio Old Town, Constitution Square, Bourtzi Castle, Othonos Street, Nafplio Town Hall, central square of Nafplio, view of Nafplio and the surrounding areas, roundabout at the entrance of the port

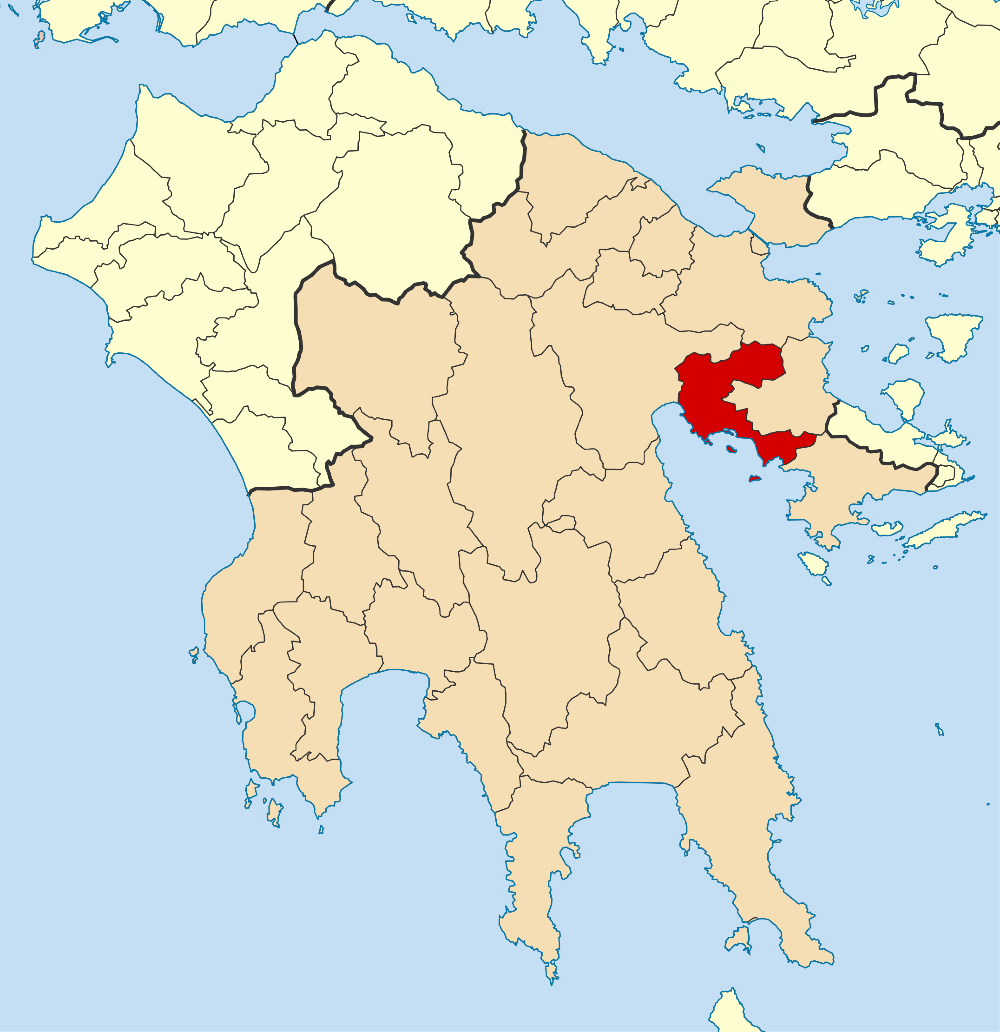

- Location within Greece
- Coordinates: 37°33′57″N 22°48′00″E
- Country: Greece
- Administrative region: Peloponnese
- Regional unit: Argolis

Government
  - Mayor: Dimitrios Orfanos (since 2023)

Area
  - Municipality: 390.2 km^{2} (150.7 sq mi)
  - Municipal unit: 33.62 km^{2} (12.98 sq mi)
- Elevation: 10 m (33 ft)

Population (2021)
  - Municipality: 32,625
  - Density: 83.61/km^{2} (216.6/sq mi)
  - Municipal unit: 19,375
  - Municipal unit density: 576.3/km^{2} (1,493/sq mi)
  - Community: 14,532
- Time zone: UTC+2 (EET)
  - Summer (DST): UTC+3 (EEST)
- Postal code: 211 00
- Area code: 2752
- Vehicle registration: ΑΡ
- Website: www.nafplio.gr

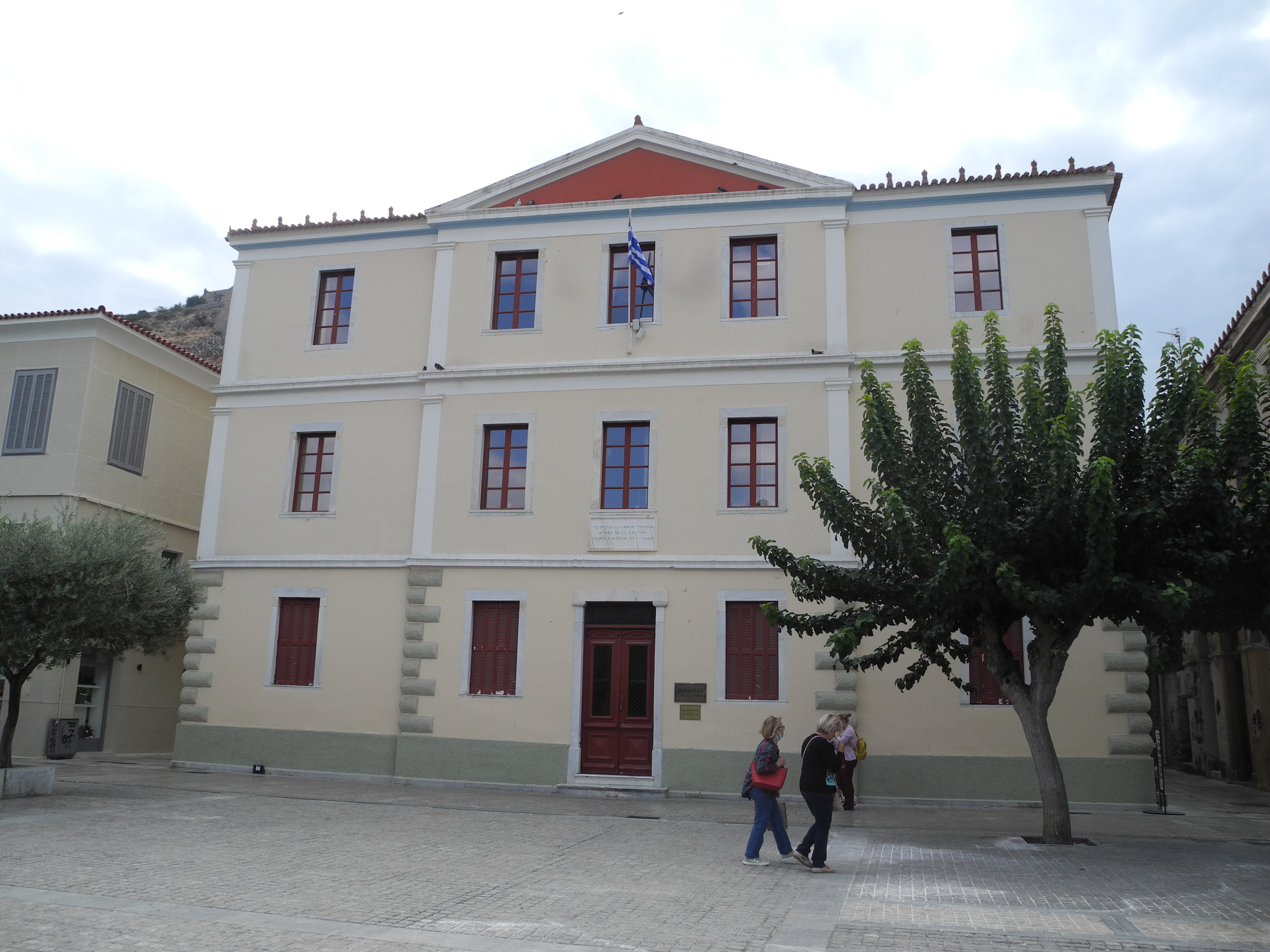
View of the Nafplio Town Hall on Βασ. Κωνσταντίνου (Vasileos Konstantinou).

Nafplio or Nafplion (Greek: Ναύπλιο, romanized: Náfplio) is a coastal city located in the Peloponnese in Greece. It is the capital of the regional unit of Argolis and an important tourist destination. Founded in antiquity, the city became an important seaport in the Middle Ages during the Frankokratia as part of the lordship of Argos and Nauplia, held initially by the de la Roche following the Fourth Crusade before coming under the Republic of Venice and, lastly, the Ottoman Empire. It later served as the first official capital of the modern Greek state, from 1827 to 1834.

== Name ==
The name of the town changed several times over the centuries. The modern Greek name of the town is Nafplio (Ναύπλιο). In modern English, the most frequently used forms are Nauplia and Navplion.

The oldest reference to Nafplio appears to be in the so-called "Aegean List" from the Mortuary Temple of Amenhotep III, dating to 14th century BCE, where it is recorded as npry (nw-py-r-y).

In Classical Antiquity, it was known as Nauplia (Ναυπλία) in Attic Greek and Naupliē (Ναυπλίη) in Ionian Greek. In Latin, it was called Nauplia.

During the Middle Ages, several variants were used in Byzantine Greek, including Náfplion (Ναύπλιον), Anáplion (Ἀνάπλιον), and Anáplia (Ἀνάπλια).

During the Late Middle Ages and early modern period, under Venetian domination, the town was known in Italian as Napoli di Romania, after the medieval usage of "Romania" to refer to the lands of the Byzantine Empire, and to distinguish it from Napoli (Naples) in Italy.

Also during the early modern period, but this time under Ottoman rule, the Turkish name of the town was Mora Yenişehir, after Morea, a medieval name for the Peloponnese, and "yeni şehir", the Turkish term for "new city" (apparently a translation from the Greek Νεάπολη, Italian Napoli). The Ottomans also called it Anabolı.

In the 19th century and early 20th century, the town was called indiscriminately Náfplion (Ναύπλιον) and Nafplio (Ναύπλιο) in modern Greek. Both forms were used in official documents and travel guides. This explains why the old form Náfplion (sometimes transliterated to Navplion) still occasionally survives up to this day.

== Geography ==
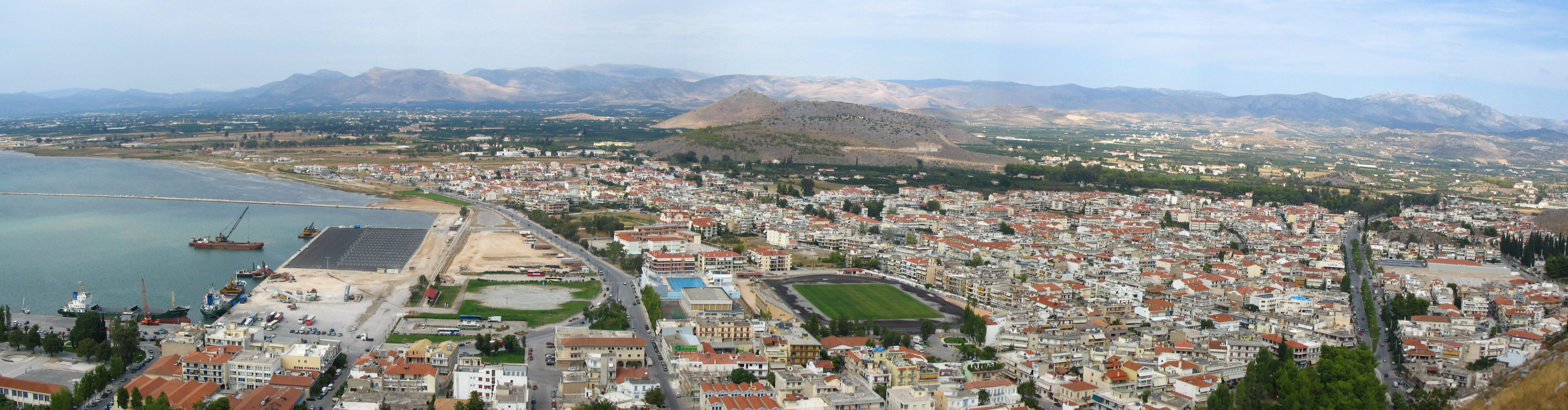
Panorama of modern Nafplion.

Nafplio is situated on the Argolic Gulf in the northeast Peloponnese. Most of the old town is on a peninsula jutting into the gulf; this peninsula forms a naturally protected bay that is enhanced by the addition of human-made moles. The city was originally almost isolated by marshes; landfill projects, primarily since the 1970s, have nearly doubled its land area.

== Municipality ==
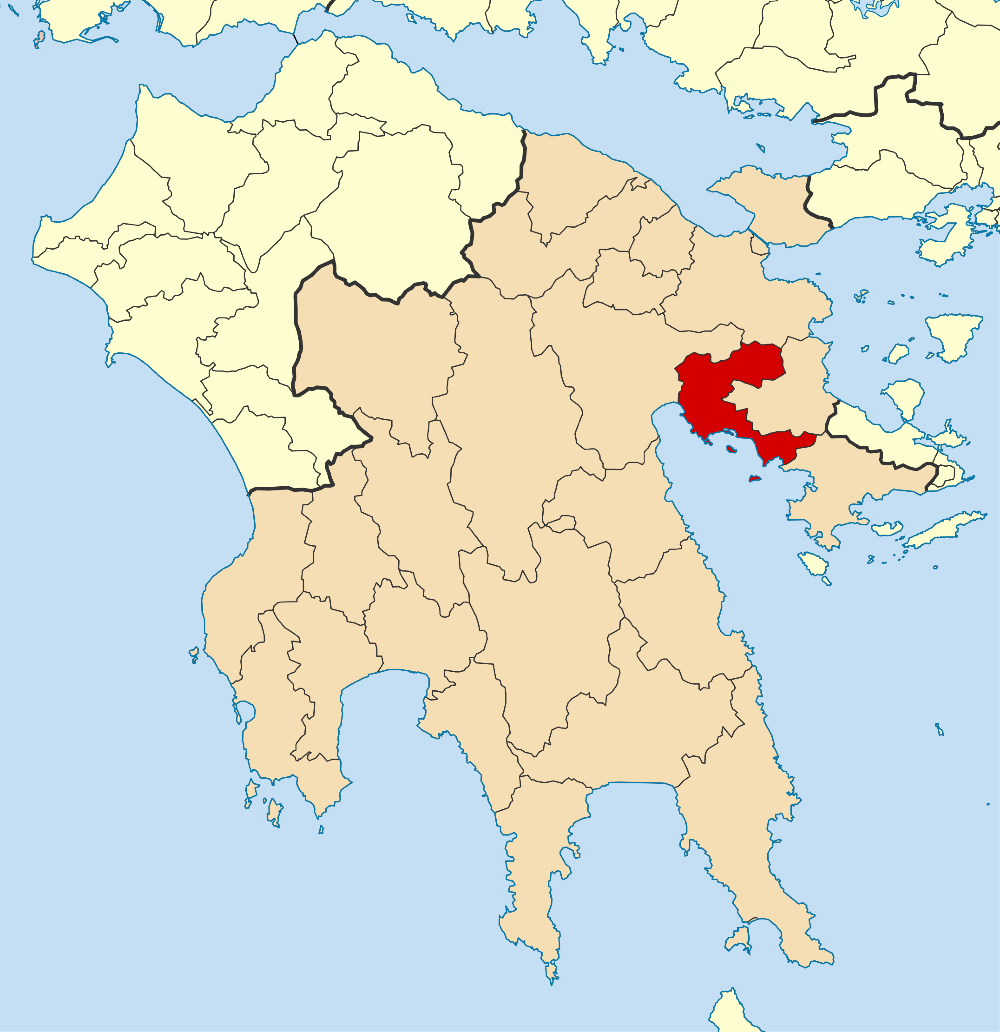
Nafplio municipality

The municipality Nafplio was formed at the 2011 local government reform by the merger of the following 4 former municipalities, that became municipal units:

- Asini
- Midea
- Nafplio
- Nea Tiryntha

The municipality has an area of 390.241 km^{2}, the municipal unit 33.619 km^{2}. The municipal unit Nafplio consists of the communities Nafplio, Aria, Lefkakia and Pyrgiotika.

== Population ==
| Year | Community | Municipal unit | Municipality |
|---|---|---|---|
| 1991 | 10,611 | - | - |
| 1991 | 10,897 | 14,704 | - |
| 2001 | 13,802 | 16,885 | - |
| 2011 | 14,200 | 18,910 | 33,356 |
| 2021 | 14,532 | 19,375 | 32,625 |

== History ==
=== Mythical origins and Classical antiquity ===
The area surrounding Nafplio has been inhabited since ancient times, but few signs of this, aside from the walls of the Acronauplia, remain visible. The town has been a stronghold on several occasions during Classical Antiquity. It seems to be mentioned on an Egyptian funerary inscription of Amenophis III as Nuplija. Nauplia (Ancient Greek: ἡ Ναυπλία) was the port of Argos, in ancient Argolis. It was situated upon a rocky peninsula, connected with the mainland by a narrow isthmus. It was a very ancient place, and is said to have derived its name from Nauplius, the son of Poseidon and Amymone, and the father of Palamedes, though it more probably owed its name, as Strabo has observed, to its harbour. Pausanias tells us that the Nauplians were Egyptians belonging to the colony which Danaus brought to Argos; and from the position of their city upon a promontory running out into the sea, which is quite different from the site of the earlier Grecian cities, it is not improbable that it was originally a settlement made by strangers from the East.

Nauplia was at first independent of Argos, and a member of the maritime confederacy which held its meetings in the island of Calaureia. About the time of the Second Messenian War, it was conquered by the Argives; and the Lacedaemonians gave to its expelled citizens the town of Methone in Messenia, where they continued to reside even after the restoration of the Messenian state by the Theban general Epaminondas. Argos then took the place of Nauplia in the Calaureian confederacy; and from this time Nauplia appears in history only as the seaport of Argos. As such it is mentioned by Strabo, but in the time of Pausanias (2nd century) the place was deserted. Pausanias noticed the ruins of the walls of a temple of Poseidon, certain forts, and a fountain named Canathus, by washing in which Hera was said to have renewed her virginity every year.

=== Byzantine and Frankish rule ===
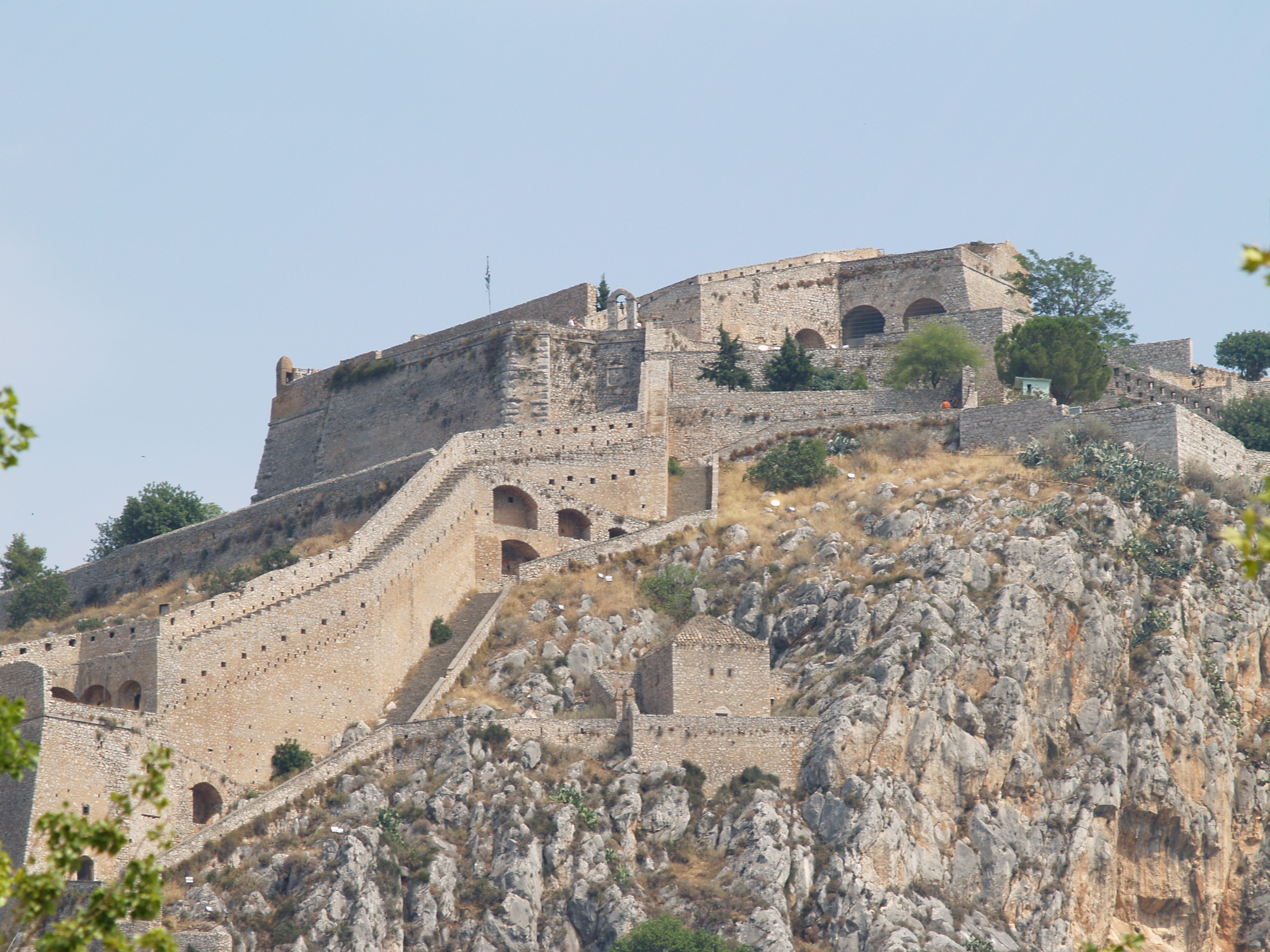
The castle of Palamidi

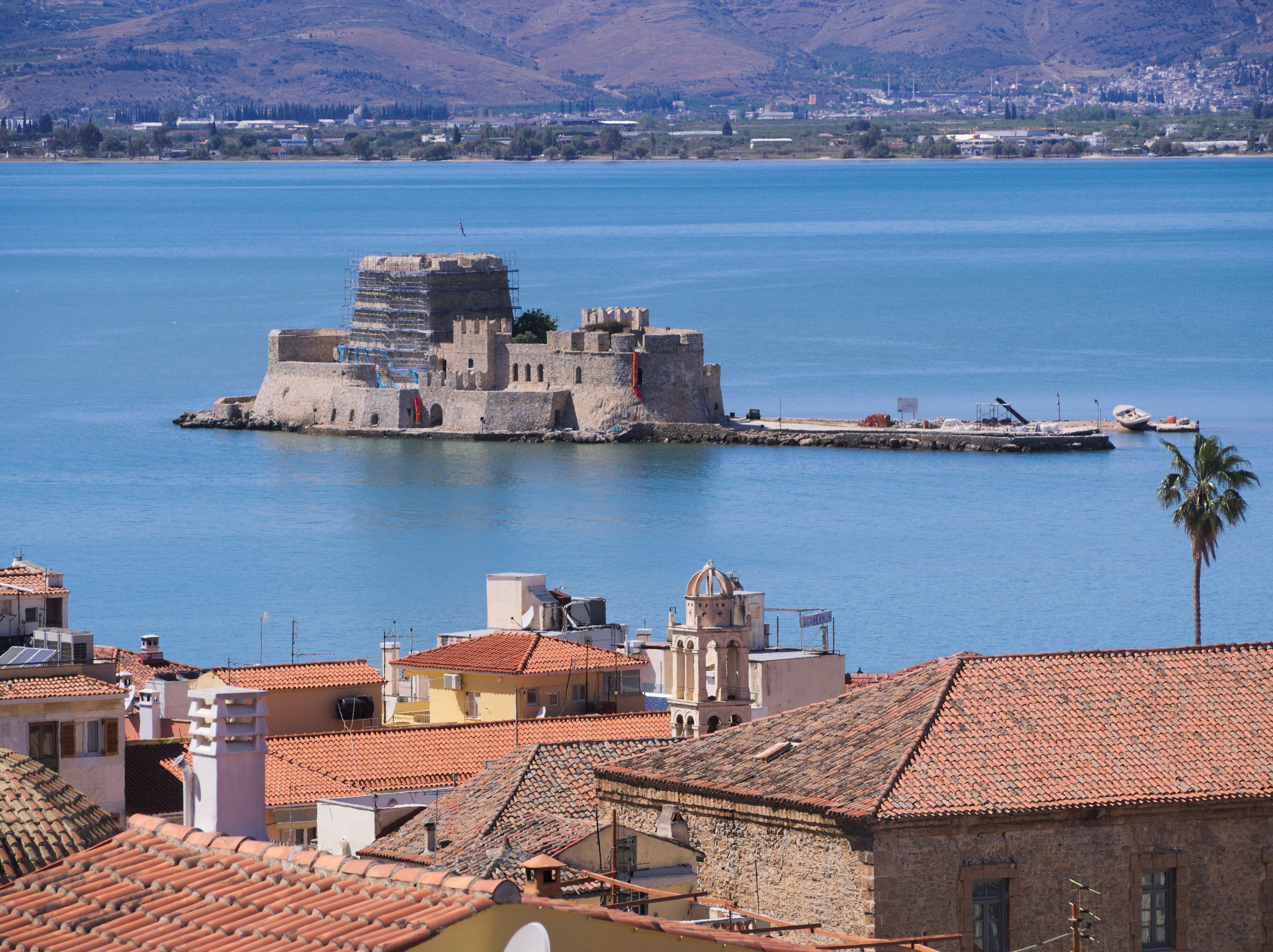
View of Bourtzi.

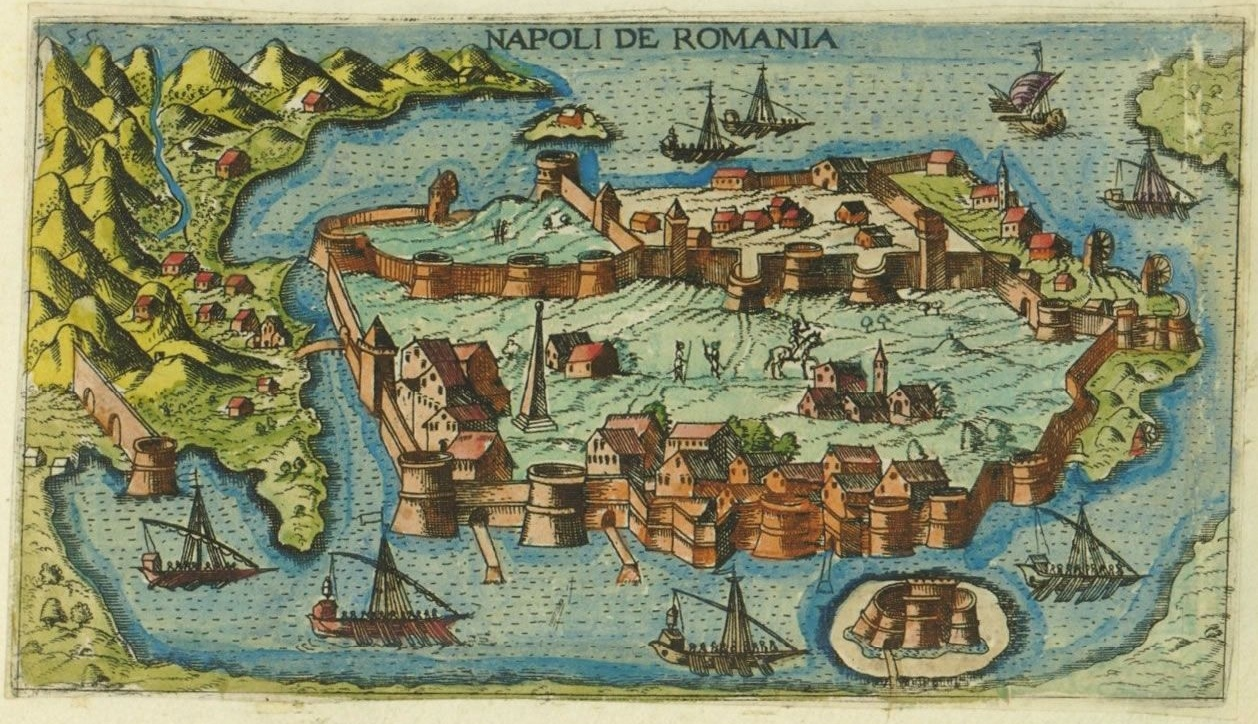
Map of the city of Nafplion (Napoli di Romania), 1597.

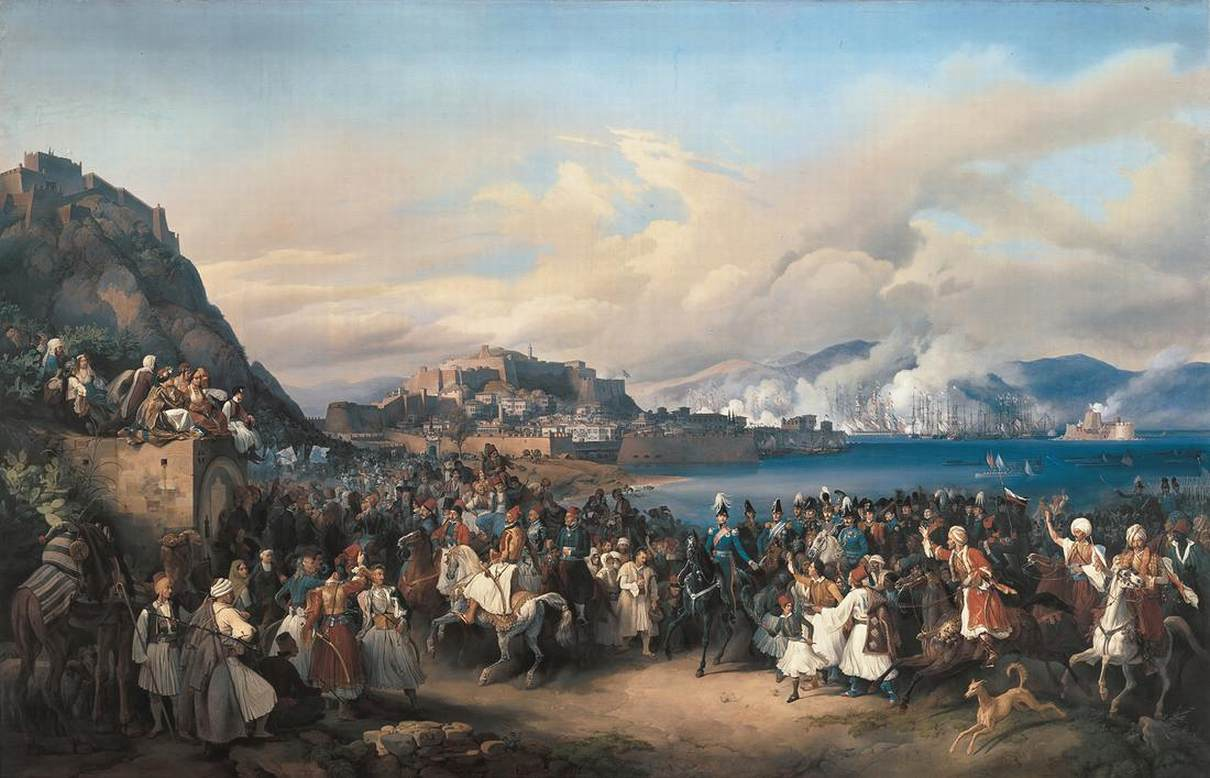
The Entry of King Otto into Nauplia by Peter von Hess

The Acronauplia has walls dating from pre-classical times. Subsequently, Byzantines, Franks, Venetians, and Turks added to the fortifications. In the Middle Ages, Nauplia was called τὸ Ναύπλιον, τὸ Ἀνάπλιον, or τὰ Ἀνάπλια. It became a place of considerable importance, and has continued so down to the present day. In the time of the Crusades it first emerges from obscurity. Nafplio was taken in 1212 by French Crusaders of the Principality of Achaea. It became part of the lordship of Argos and Nauplia, which in 1388 was sold to the Republic of Venice, who regarded it as one of their most important places in the Levant. During the subsequent 150 years, the lower city was expanded and fortified, and new fortifications added to Acronauplia.

=== Venetian and Ottoman rule ===
Under Venetian rule, the city twice repelled Ottoman attacks and sieges, first by Mehmed the Conqueror during the Ottoman–Venetian War (1463–1479) and then by Suleiman the Magnificent. The city surrendered to the Ottomans in 1540, who renamed it Mora Yenişehri and established it as the seat of a sanjak.

The Venetians retook Nafplio in 1685 and made it the capital of their "Kingdom of the Morea". The city was strengthened by building the castle of Palamidi, which was in fact the last major construction of the Venetian empire overseas. However, only 80 soldiers were assigned to defend the city and it was easily retaken by the Ottomans in 1715. Palamidi is located on a hill north of the old town. During the Greek War of Independence, it played a major role. It was captured by forces of Staikopoulos and Kolokotronis in November 1822.

=== 19th century: Independence and first capital ===
During the Greek War of Independence, Nafplio was a major Ottoman stronghold and was besieged for more than a year. The town finally surrendered on account of forced starvation. After its capture, because of its strong fortifications, it became the seat of the provisional government of Greece.

Count Ioannis Kapodistrias, first head of state of newly liberated Greece, set foot on the Greek mainland for the first time in Nafplio on 7 January 1828 and made it the official capital of Greece in 1829. He was assassinated on 9 October 1831 by members of the Mavromichalis family, on the steps of the church of Saint Spyridon in Nafplio. After his assassination, a period of anarchy followed, until the arrival of King Otto and the establishment of the new Kingdom of Greece. Nafplio remained the capital of the kingdom until 1834, when King Otto decided to move the capital to Athens.

=== 20th and 21st centuries ===
Tourism emerged as an important economic activity following the Greek Civil War, and Nafplio became one of the first areas to develop mass tourism in the mainland. Nowadays it is one of the most popular destinations in Greece and attracts a large variety of tourists, with the most coming from Athens and other cities in Greece, followed by many tourists from Germany, France, Scandinavia, Russia, the Balkans and the United States. Due to its architectural legacy, its proximity to the capital, Athens, and its mild and pleasant climate it attracts visitors all-year round, and it is the most popular destination for weekend or one-day excursions.

Apart from tourism agriculture is a very important sector and the city is also surrounded by a fertile irrigated plain and produces oranges, lemons, peaches, apricots, olives and almonds. The Port of Nafplio is used only for bulk cargo due to its insufficient depth and also hosts a great number of leisure ships during the tourist season. The city has not developed any industrial activity of note and all secondary activities are related to agriculture or the construction industry.

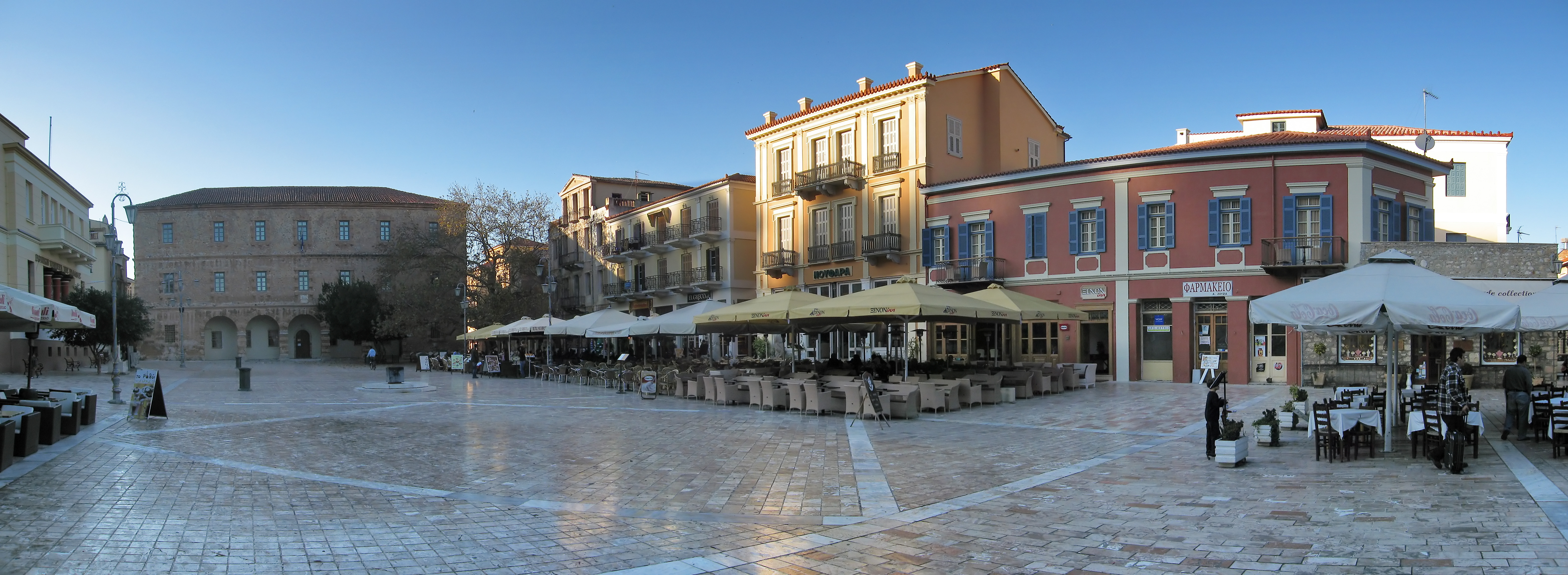
Plateia Syntagmatos (Constitution Square).

== Transportation ==
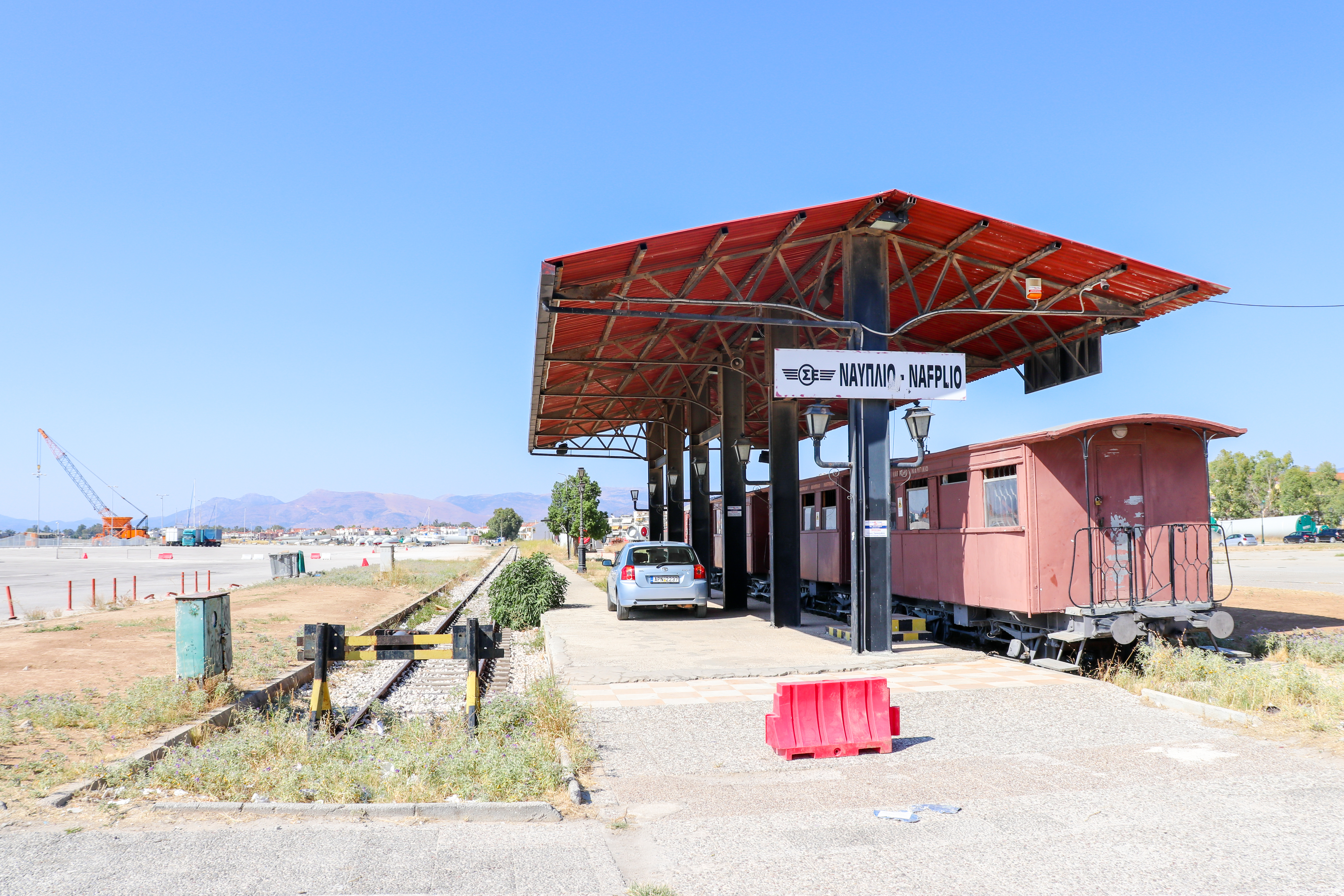
Nafplio train station in 2019.

=== Bus ===
Since 1952, the town has been served by public bus (KTEL Argolida), which provides daily services to all destinations in region as well as other major Greek centers such as Athens. The journey to Athens takes two to two hours and 20 minutes, going via Corinth/Isthmos and Argos.

=== Train ===
Rail service began in 1886 using an earlier station that still stands.

The town is connected by a branch line of ten kilometers from Argos to Nafplio. In 2011, the Corinth–Argos–Nafplio train service was suspended during the Greek financial crisis. The Region of the Peloponnese is currently trying to secure funding to restore railway services and modernize the line.

== Architecture ==
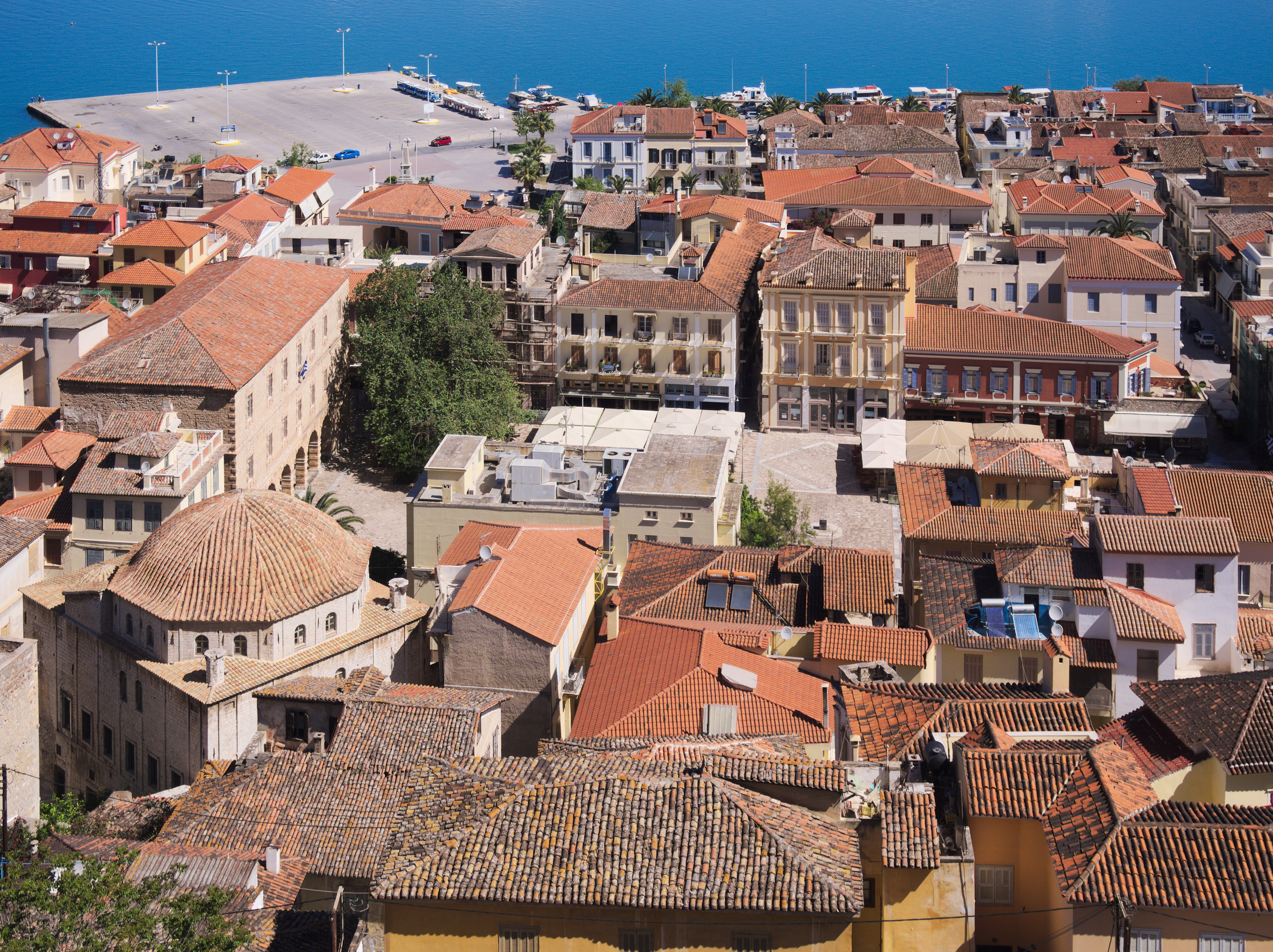
Traditional houses. View from Acronauplia.

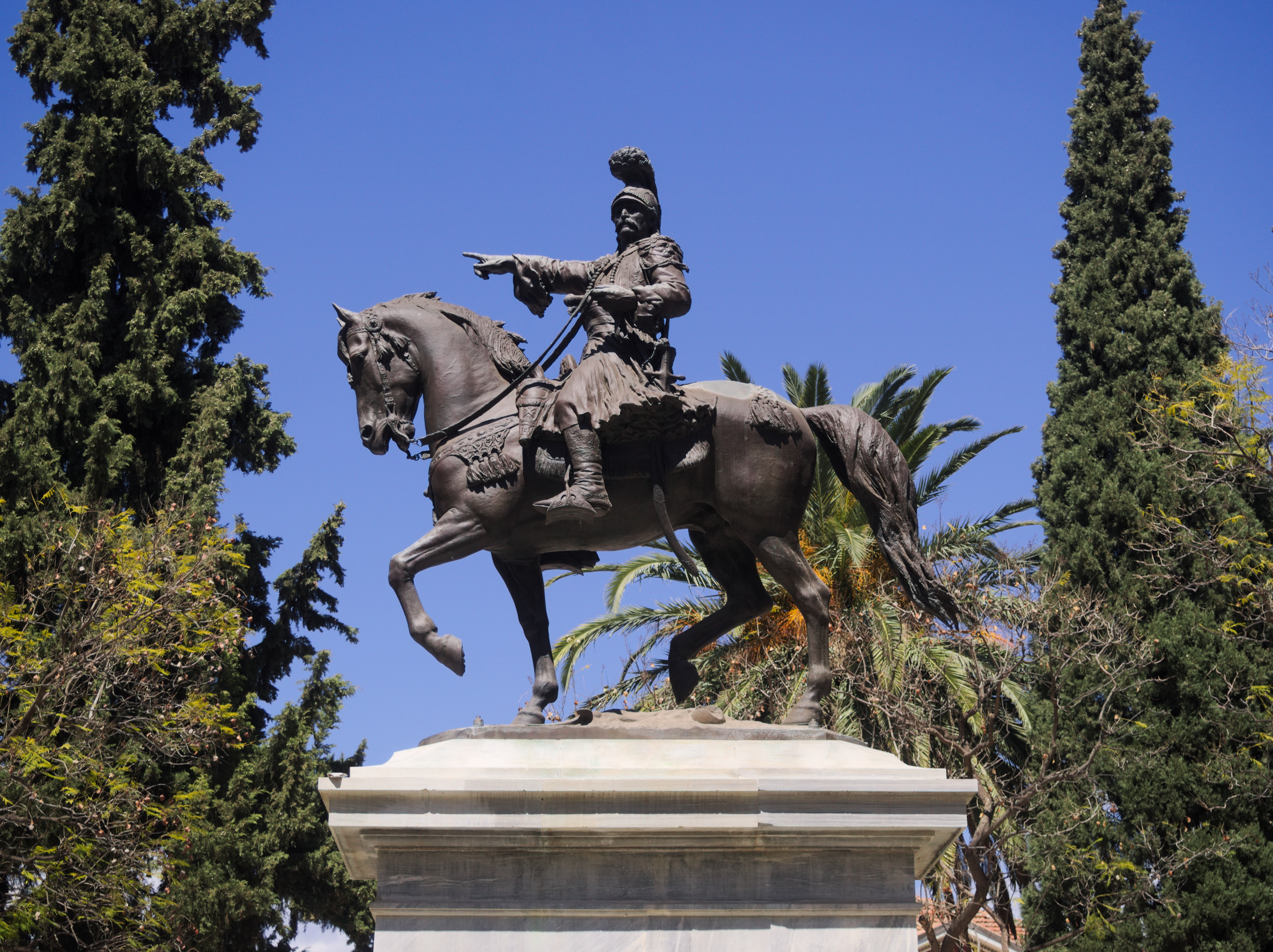
Statue of Theodoros Kolokotronis

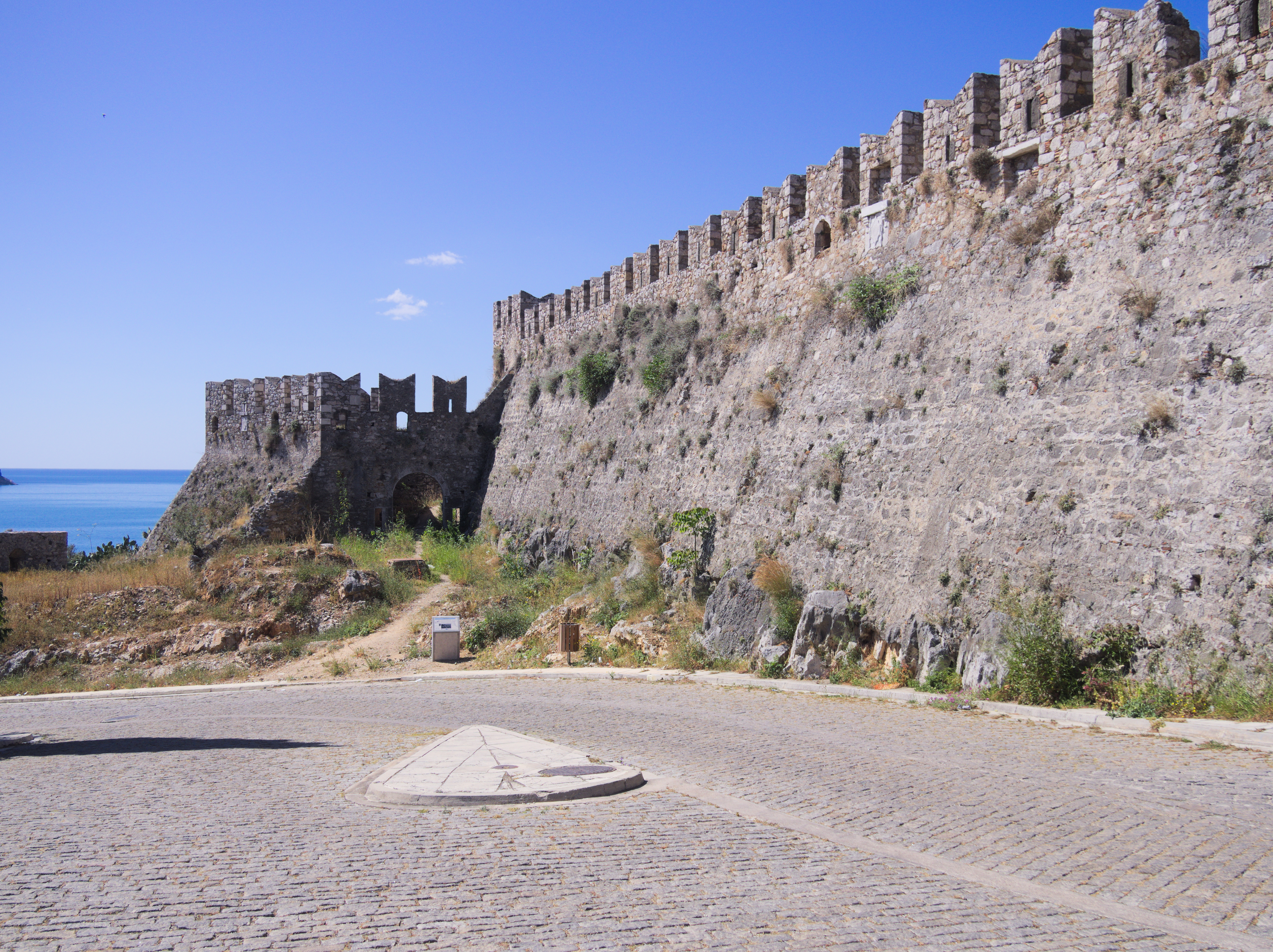
Fortifications of Acronauplia

Acronauplia is the oldest part of the city though a modern hotel has been built on it. Until the thirteenth century, it was a town on its own. The arrival of the Venetians and the Franks transformed it into part of the town fortifications. Other fortifications of the city include the Palamidi and Bourtzi, which is located in the middle of the harbour.

Nafplio maintains its own distinct traditional architectural style with many colourful buildings around the old town, influenced by the Venetians, due to their domination between 1338–1540 and during the Kingdom of the Morea and to a much lower degree by the Ottomans. Furthermore the city also contains a great number of eclecticist and neoclassical buildings and even a smaller number of modernist buildings such as Hotel Amphitryon (designed in the 1950s by architect Kleon Krantonellis). The city also contains the only example of Mycenaean Revival architecture, the National Bank of Greece branch of Nafplio.

It is one of the few Greek cities to have been spared the widespread destruction of traditional architecture during the process of antiparochí, due to the efforts of the archaeologist Evangelia Protonotariou Deilaki, whose actions went against the prevailing trend of the post-war era.

Around the city can be found several sculptures and statues. They are related mostly with the modern history of Nafplio, such as the statues of Ioannis Kapodistrias, Otto of Greece and Theodoros Kolokotronis.

== Quarters ==
- Gyalós
- Kourti
- Old town
- Psaromachalas
- Prónoia (planned by Stamatis Voulgaris)

== Culture ==
=== Cuisine ===
Local specialties include:

- Gogges (Goges), pasta
- Striftades/Striftaria, hand made pasta
- Ankinares, vegetable
- Giosa, lamb or goat meat
- Bogana, lamb meat with potatoes
- Portokalopita, sweet

=== Museums ===
- Archaeological Museum of Nafplion

=== Education ===
Since 2003, the University of Peloponnese has incorporated a new faculty, the School of Fine Arts. In 2007, a single department exists, the Department of Theatre, offering four majors:

- Acting and Directing
- Dance
- Set and Costume design
- Theatrical Studies

== Notable people ==
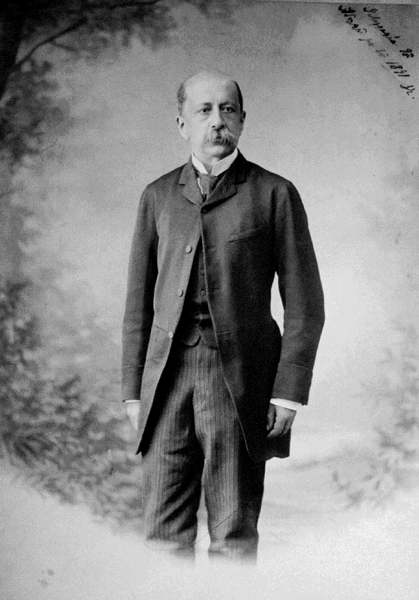
Charilaos Trikoupis was born in Nafplio

- Nicolas "the Greek" (fl. 1519–1522), one of the 18 survivors of the expedition that completed the first circumnavigation of the world on the Victoria in 1519–1522
- Tellos Agras (1880–1907), fighter in the Greek Struggle for Macedonia
- Leonidas Drosis (died 1882), sculptor
- Nina Bawden (1925–2012), writer (resident)
- Merkur Bua, 16th century Albanian Stratiot.
- Timoleon Filimon (1833-1898), politician
- Austen Kark (1926–2002), managing director of the BBC World Service (resident)
- Nikos Karouzos (1926–1990), poet
- Vangelis Kazan (1936–2008), actor
- Sotirios Sotiropoulos (1831–1898), lawyer, politician and former Prime Minister of Greece
- Dionysos Tabakis (born 1972), Greek Orthodox priest and musician
- Angelos Terzakis (1907–1979), writer
- Charilaos Trikoupis (1832–1896), Prime Minister of Greece seven times from 1875 until 1895
- Panagiotis Tachtsidis (born 1991), football player currently playing in Campeonato Brasileiro Série A for Remo
- Emmanouil Zymvrakakis (1861–1928), Greek general of World War I

== International relations ==
=== Twin towns – sister cities ===
Nafplio is twinned with:

| Burgas, Bulgaria (1984); Cetinje, Montenegro since 1995; Kronstadt, Russia; Martignas-sur-Jalle, France since 1987; Menton, France since 1996 | Niles, Illinois, United States since 1995; Ottobrunn, Germany since 1978; (Georgia (country)) Poti, Georgia (1990); Royan, France since 2005; Ypsilanti, Michigan, United States since 1997; Erftstadt, Germany |

=== Consulates ===
The city hosts honorary consulates from the following countries:

- Italy
- Russia

== Sports ==
- Pannafpliakos F.C., football

== Gallery ==
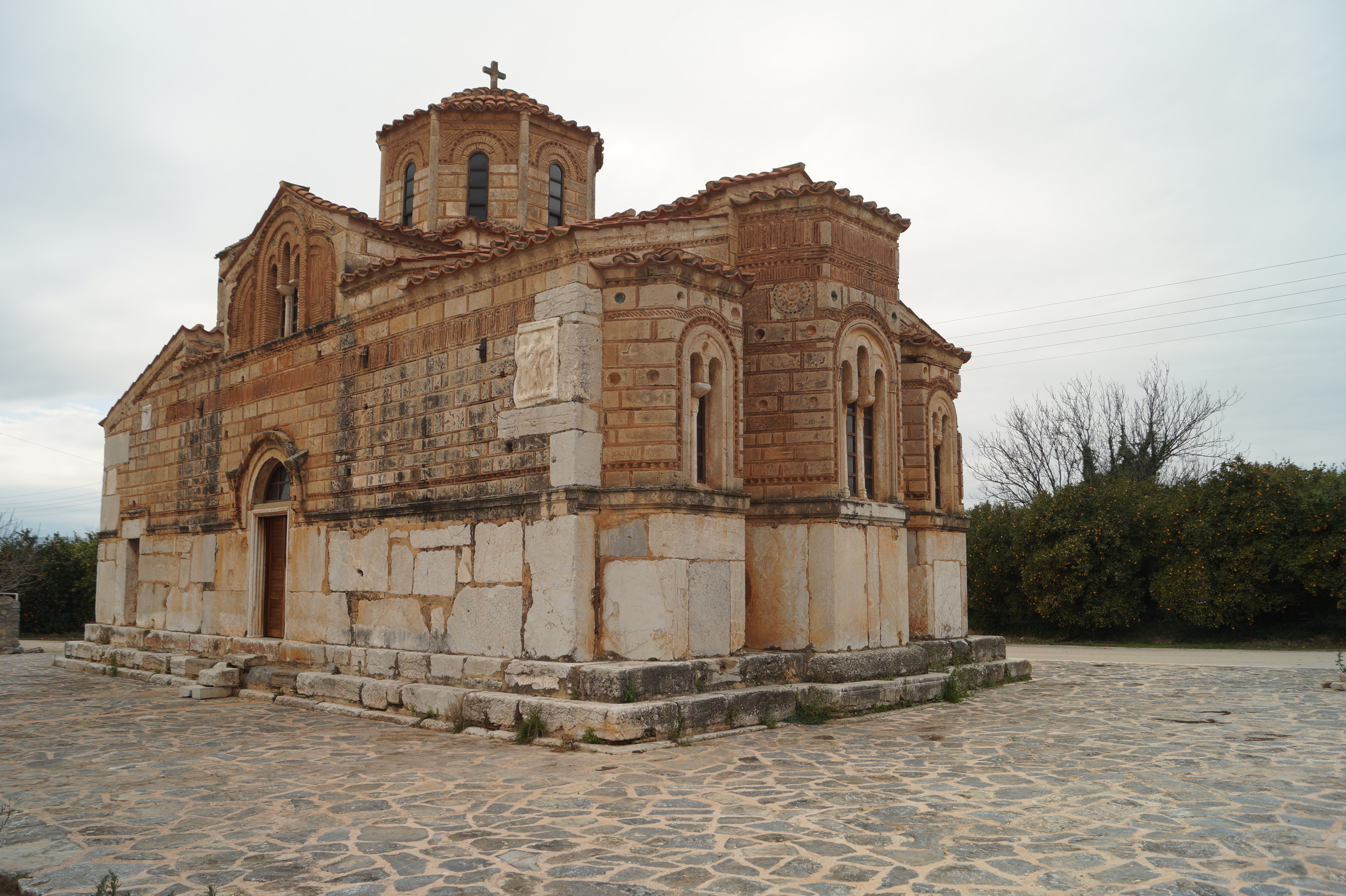
Byzantine church (12th century)

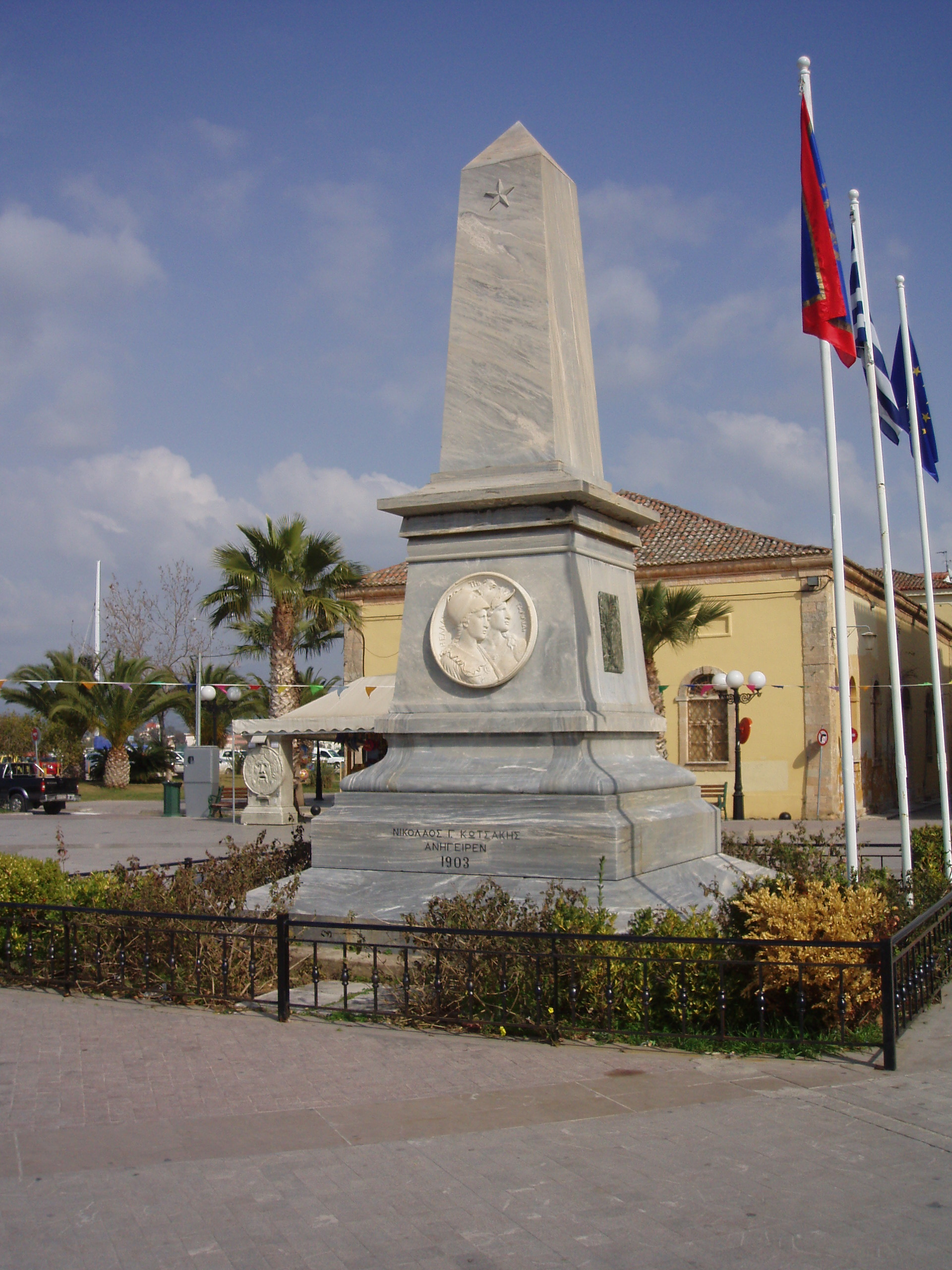
Monument for the Morea Expedition, Philellinon Square

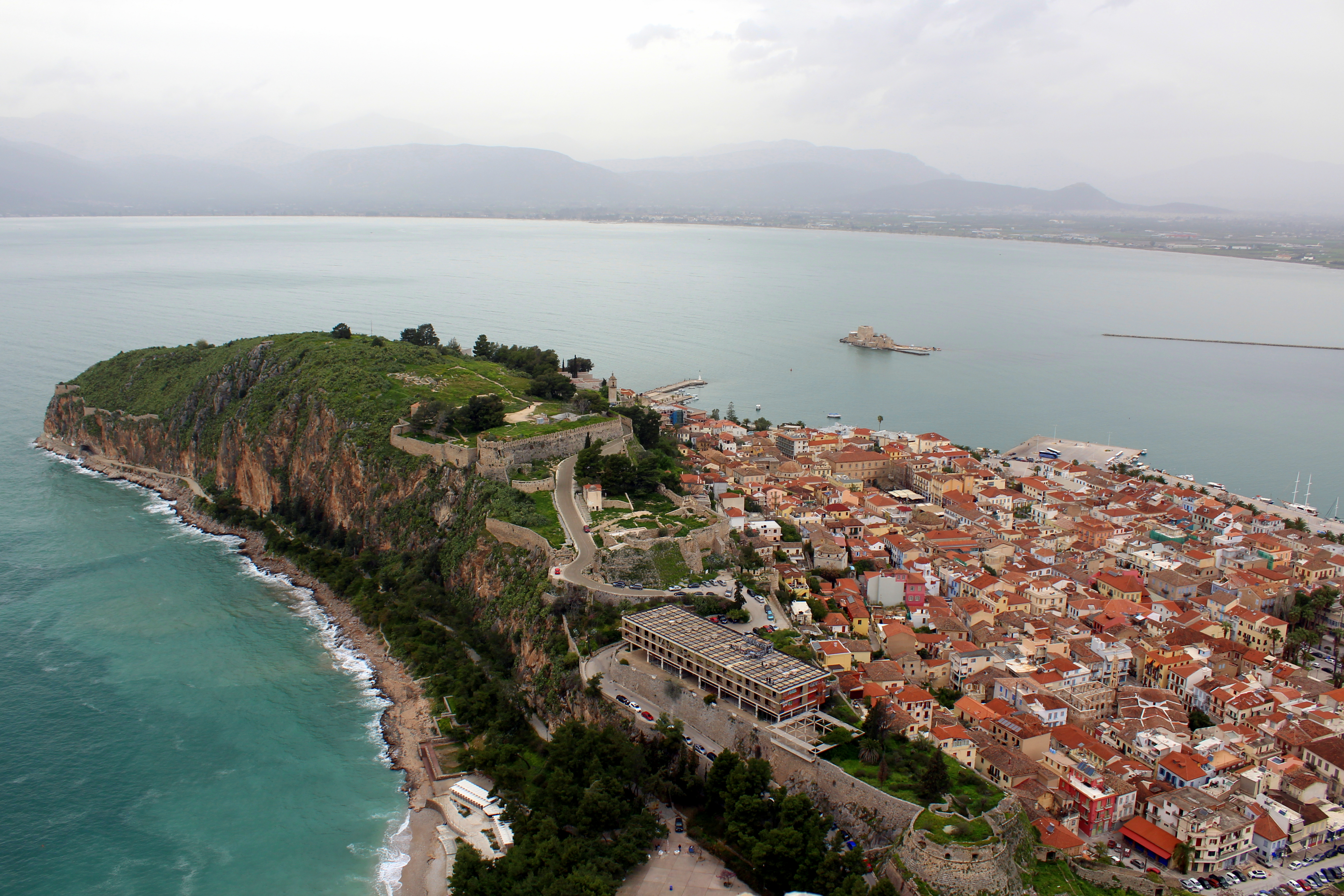
View of Acronauplia

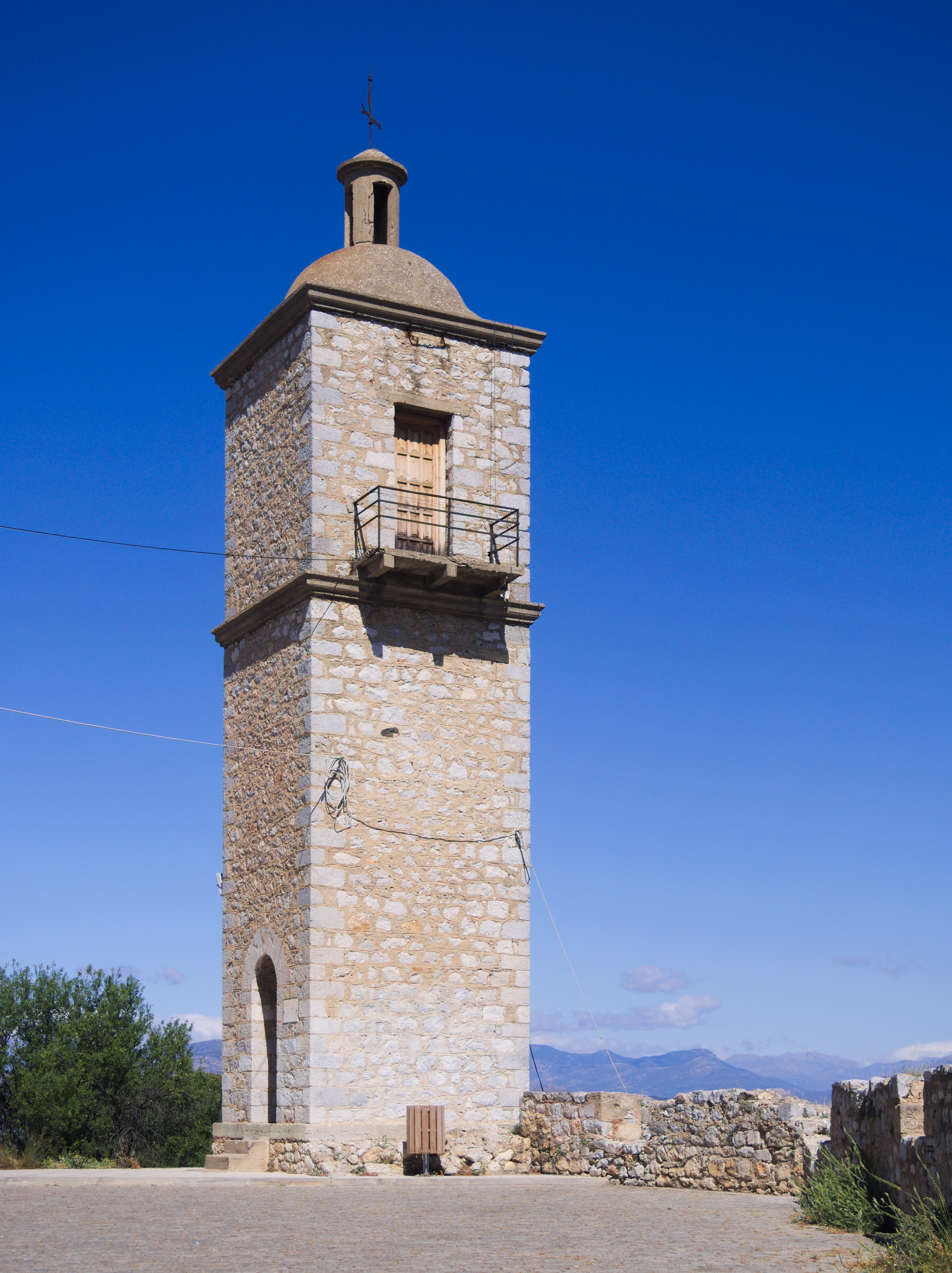
Clock tower in Acronauplia

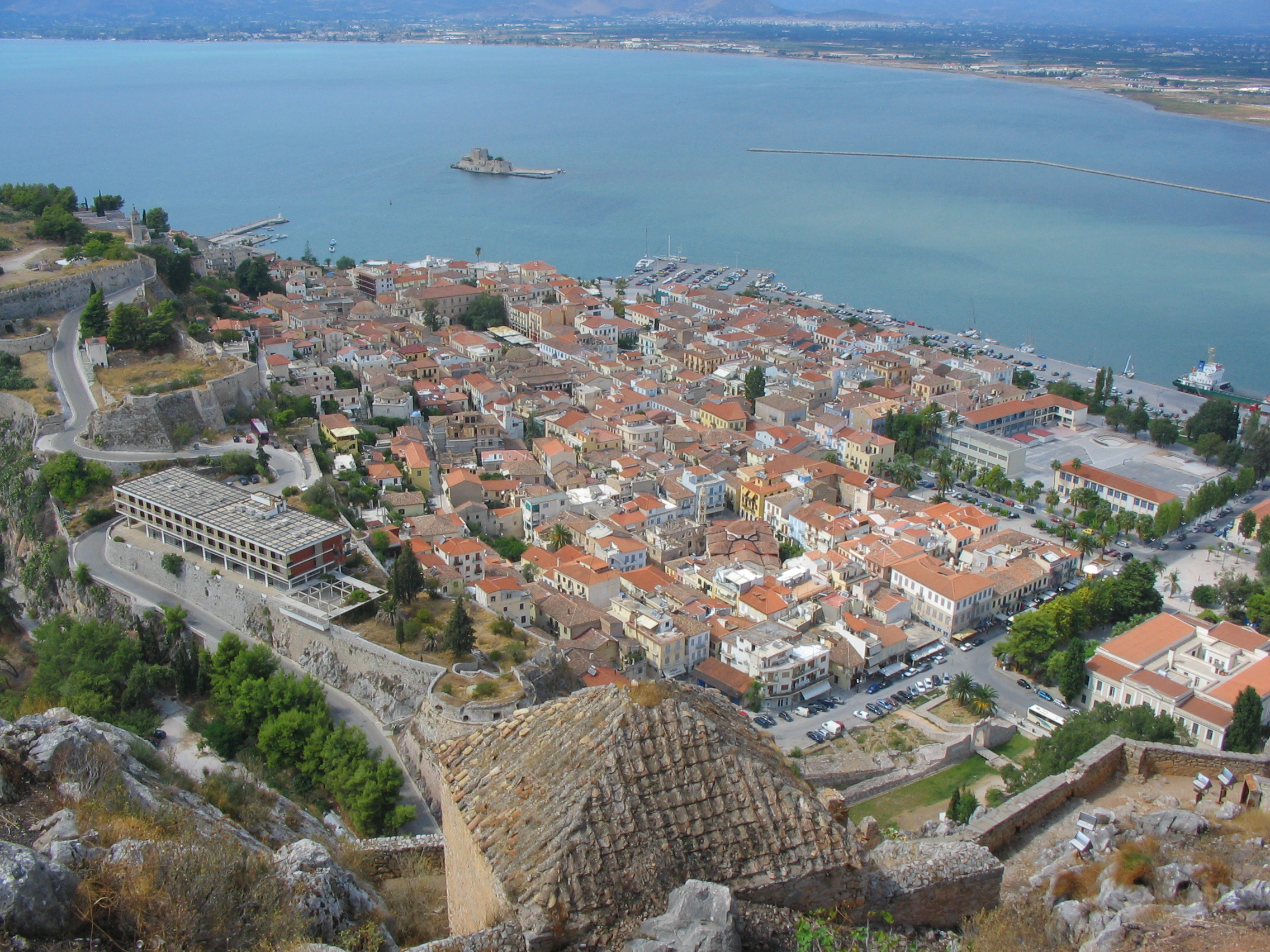
View from Palamidi

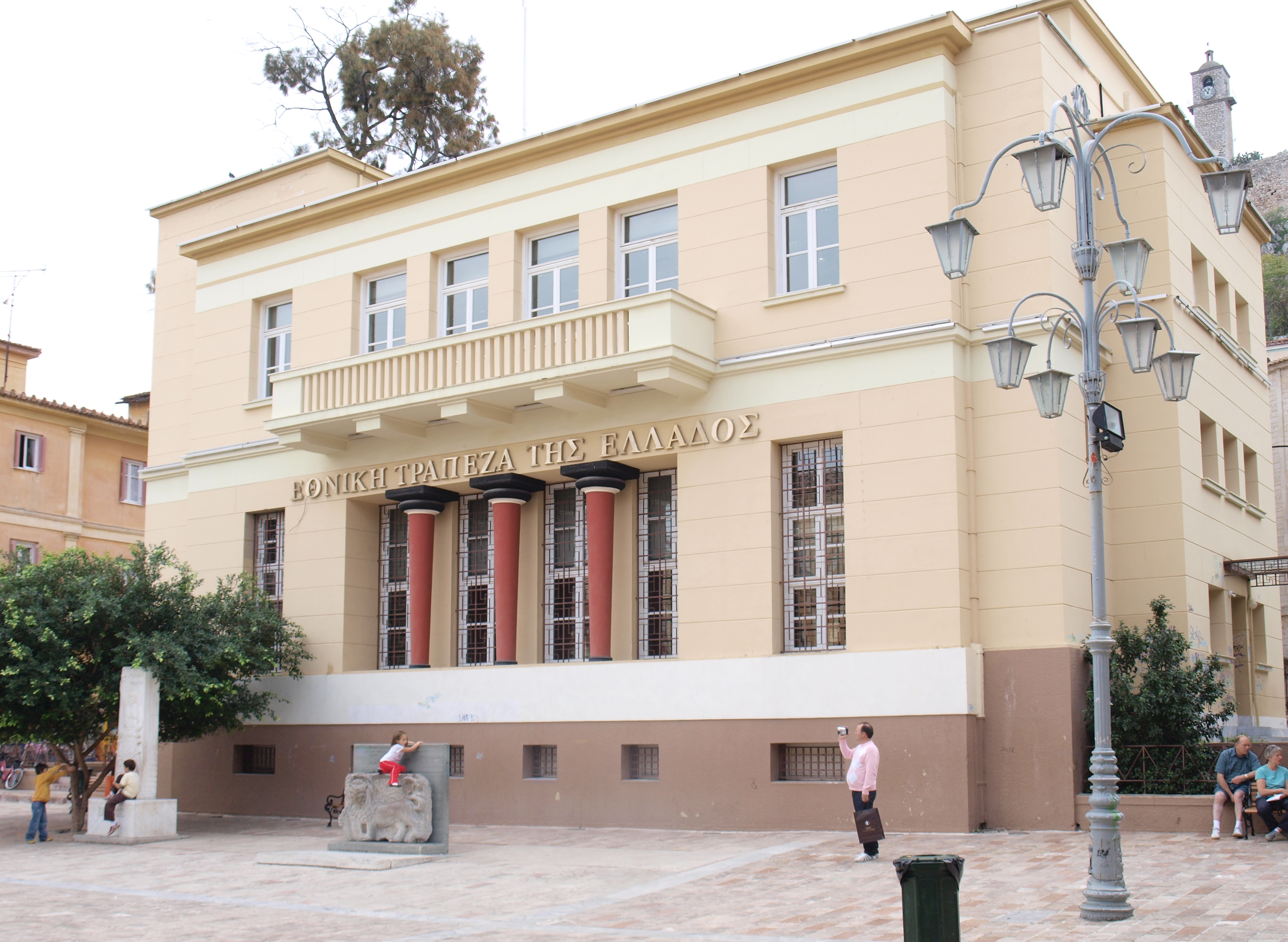
The building of National Bank of Greece (example of Mycenaean Revival architecture)

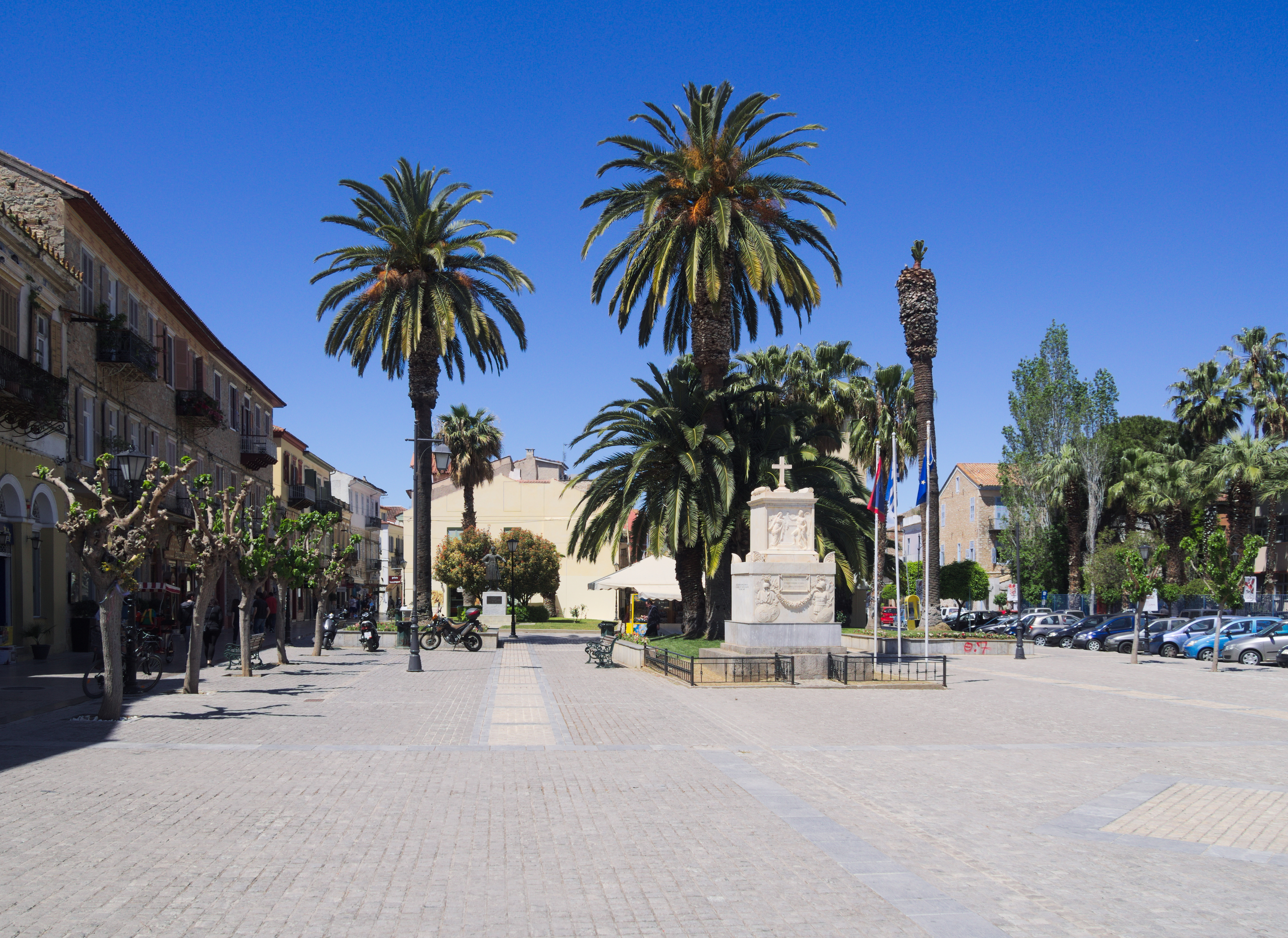
Trion Navarchon (Three admirals) Square with the monument to Demetrius Ypsilantis

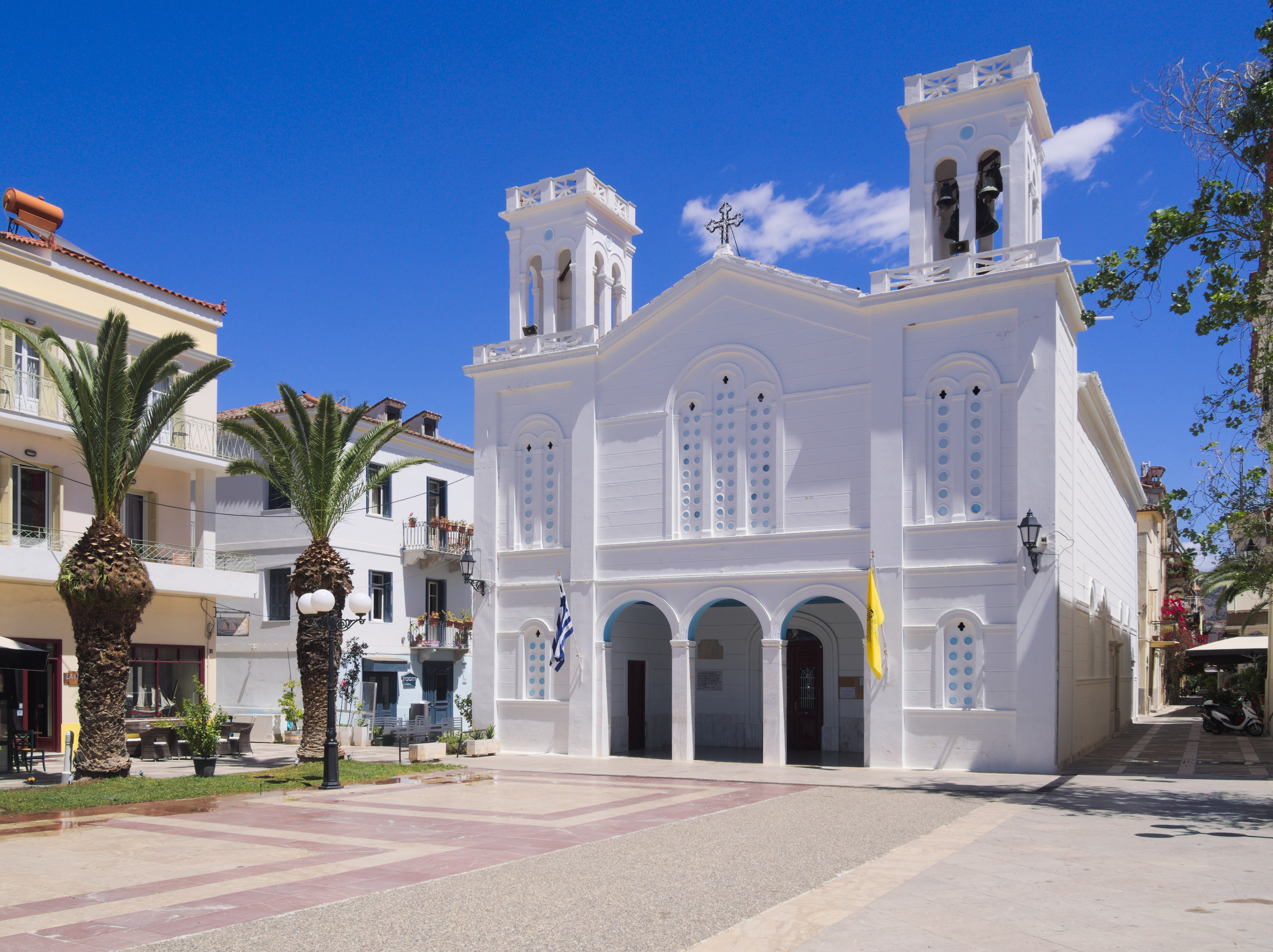
The church of Saint Nicholas

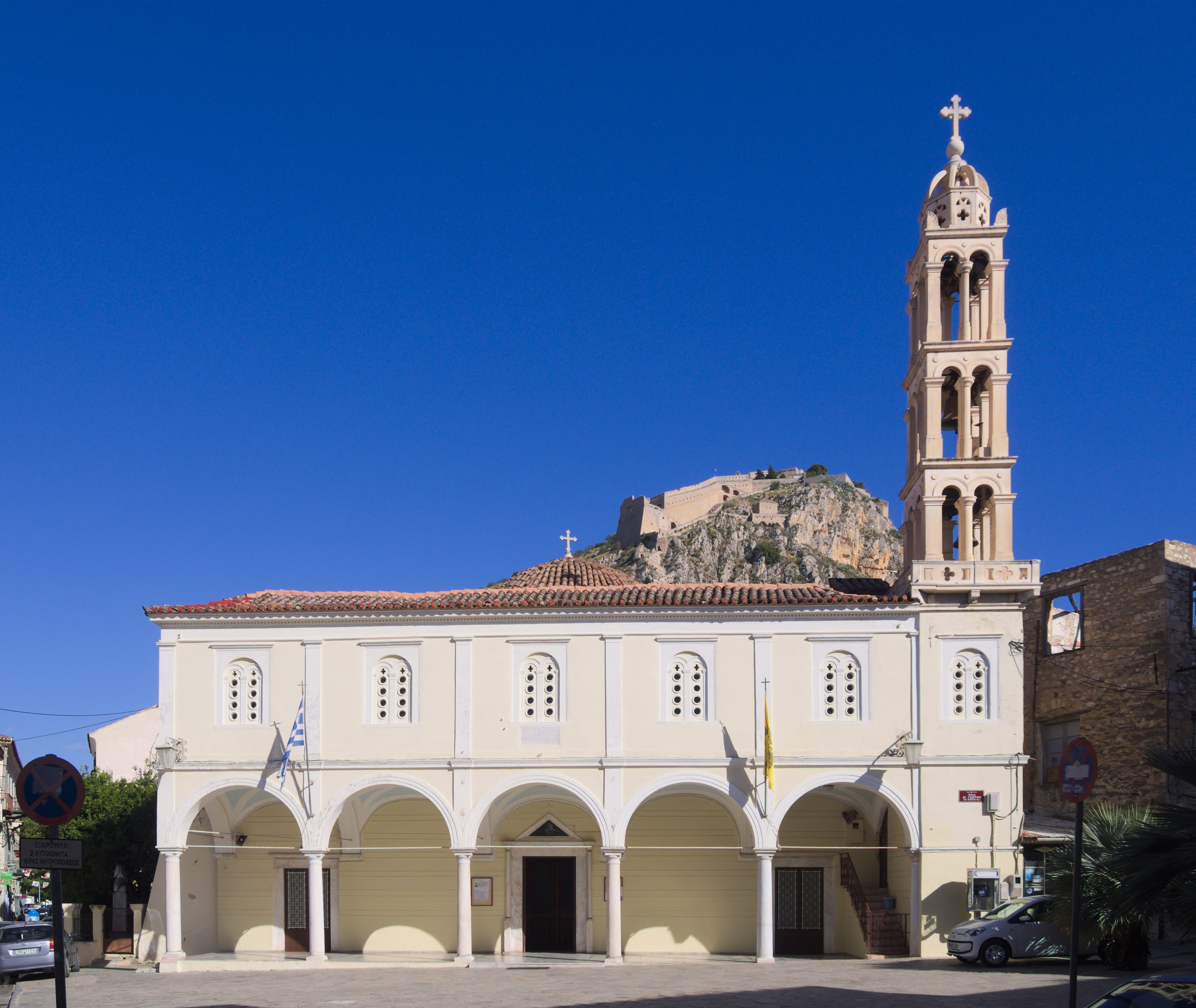
St. George Church

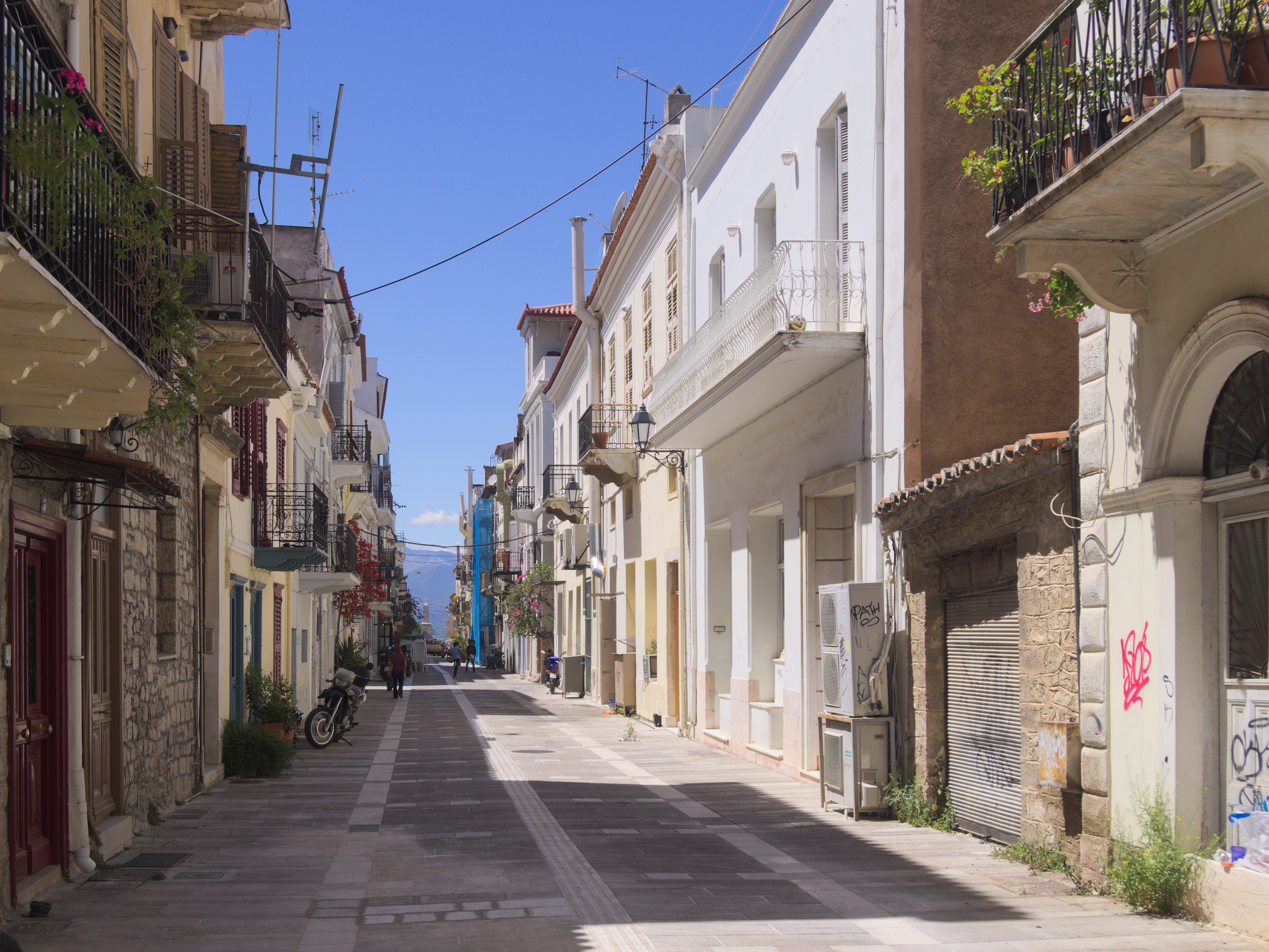
Othonos Street

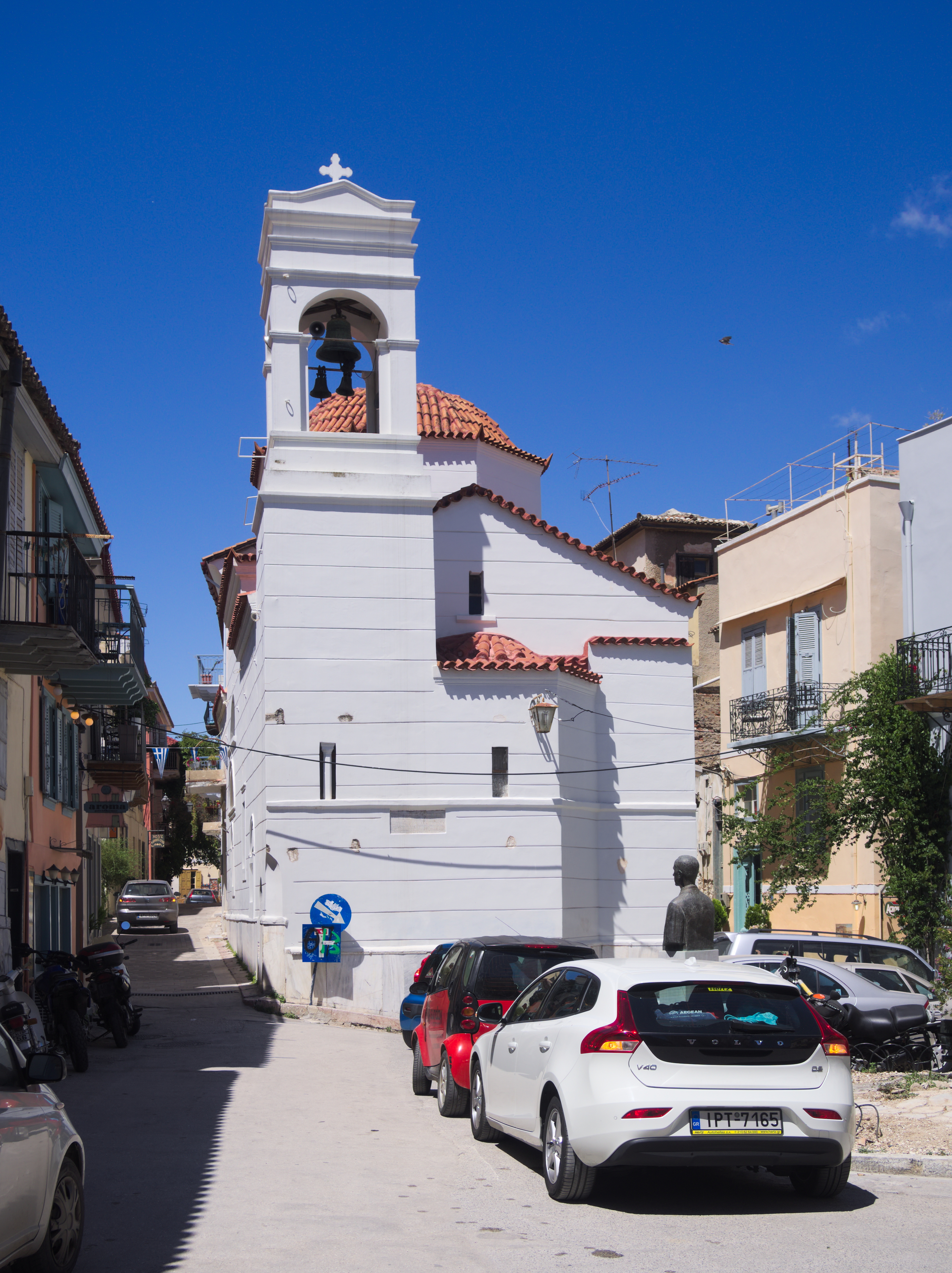
St Spyridon church, where Ioannis Kapodistrias was murdered

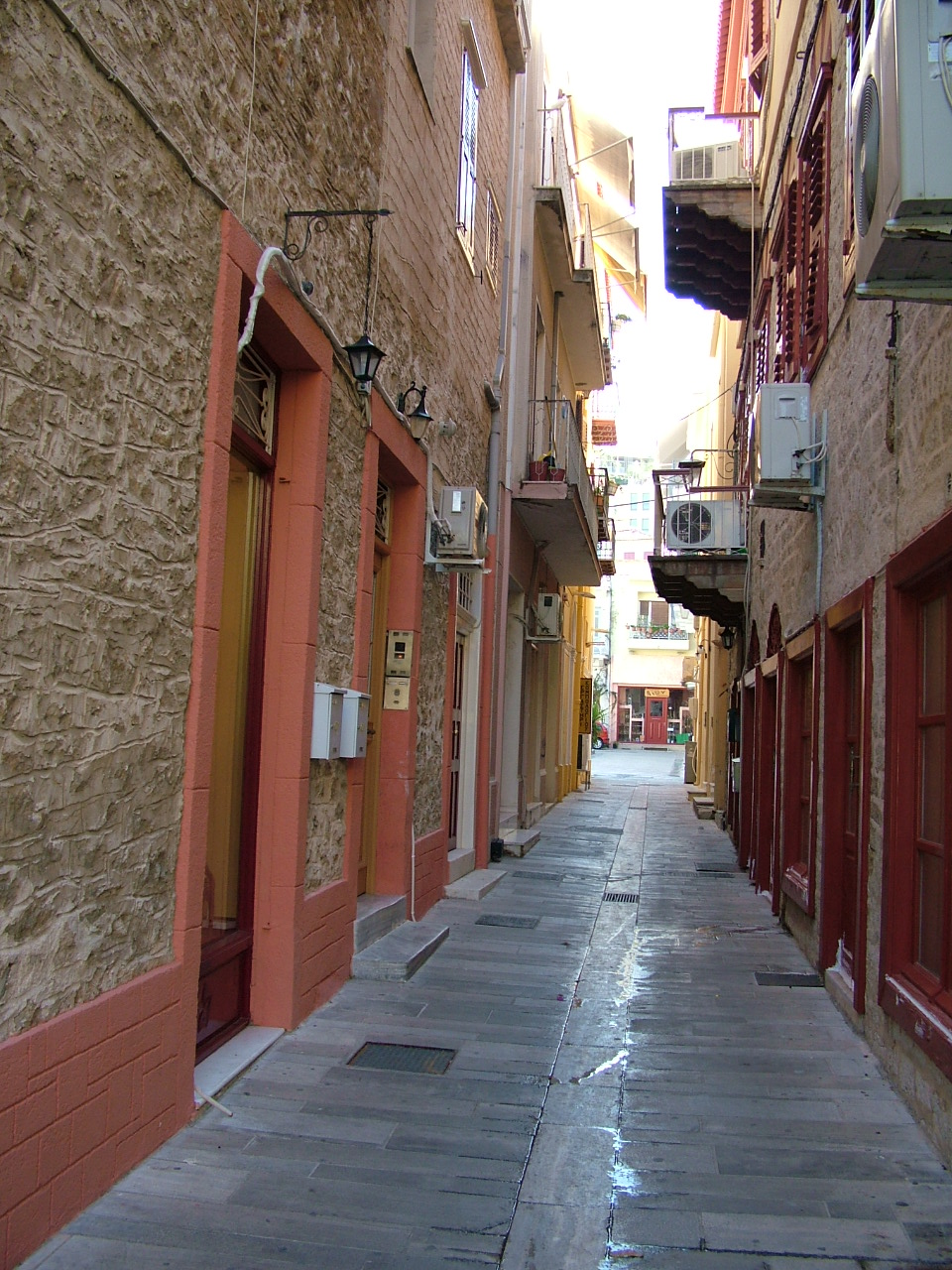
Street of Nafplio

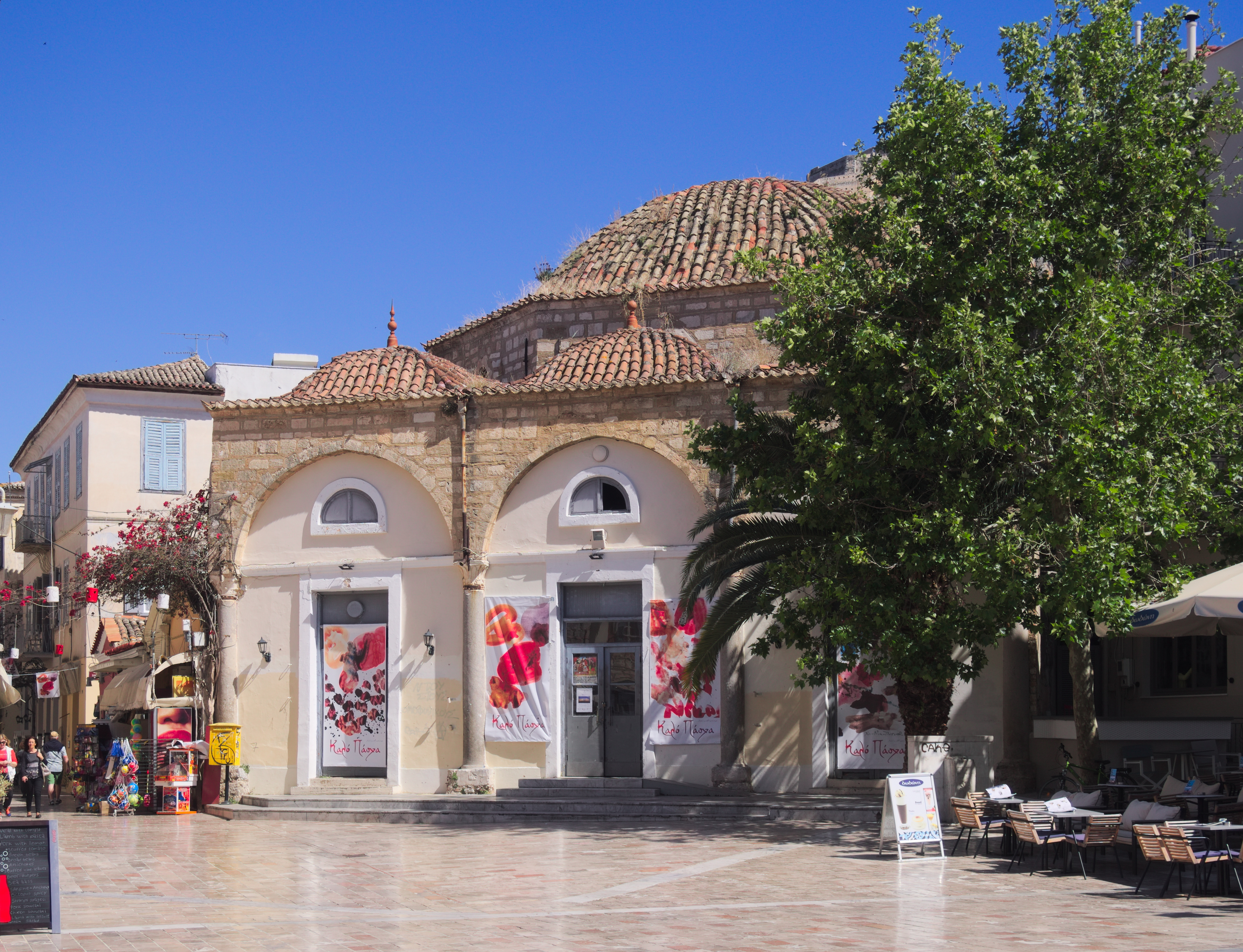
Trianon Mosque

== See also ==
- History of Greece
- Politics of Greece
- List of traditional Greek place names

== Sources ==
- Bailly, Anatole (1901), Abrégé du dictionnaire grec-français, Paris, France: Hachette.
- Entick, John. A Compendious Dictionary of the English and Latin Tongues. New edition carefully revised and augmented throughout by Rev. M.G. Sarjant. London, 1825. ()
- Ellingham, Mark; Dubin, Marc; Jansz, Natania; and Fisher, John (1995). Greece, the Rough Guide. Rough Guides. ISBN 1-85828-131-8.
- Gerola, Giuseppe (1930–31). "Le fortificazioni di Napoli di Romania," Annuario dell regia scuola archeologicca di Atene e delle missioni italiane in oriente 22-24. pp. 346–410.
- Gregory, Timothy E. (1983). Nauplion. Athens.
- Karouzos, Semnes (1979). To Nauplio. Athens.
- Kolokotrones, Theodoros (1969). Memoirs from the Greek War of Independence, 1821-1833. E. M. Edmunds, trans. Originally printed as Kolokotrones: The Klepht and the Warrior. Sixty Years of Peril and Daring. An Autobiography. London, 1892; reprint, Chicago.
- Lamprynides, Michael G. (1898). Ê Nauplia. Athens, reprint 1950.
- Latacz, Joachim (2004), Troy and Homer: Towards the Solution of an Old Mystery, Oxford, UK: Oxford University Press.
- Liddell, Henry George; Scott, Robert (1889), An Intermediate Greek-English Lexicon, Oxford, UK: Clarendon Press.
- Liddell, Henry George; Scott, Robert (1940), A Greek-English Lexicon, revised and augmented by Sir Henry Stuart Jones, Oxford, UK: Clarendon Press.
- Luttrell, Anthony (1966), "The Latins of Argos and Nauplia: 1311-1394", Papers of the British School at Rome, Vol. 34, pp. 34–55.
- McCulloch, J. R. (1866). "A Dictionary, Geographical, Statistical, and Historical of the Various Countries, Places, and Principal Natural Objects in the World". New edition carefully revised. Longmans, Green, and Co., London, UK. p. 457. ()
- Merriam-Webster's Collegiate Dictionary (10th ed.), Springfield, Mass., US: Merriam-Webster, 1993.
- Schaefer, Wulf (1961). "Neue Untersuchungen über die Baugeschichte Nauplias im Mittelalter," Jahrbuch des Deutschen Archäologischen Instituts. Vol. 76, pp. 156–214.
- Smith, William, ed. (1854), Dictionary of Greek and Roman Geography (1854), London, UK: Walton and Maberly.
- Thomas, George Martin (1966). Diplomatarium Veneto-Levantinum. B. Franklin, New York, US. ()
- Wright, Diana Gilliland (1999). Bartolomeo Minio: Venetian administration in 15th-Century Nauplion. Doctoral dissertation. The Catholic University of America, Washington DC, US.

=== Attribution ===
This article incorporates text from a publication now in the public domain: Smith, William, ed. (1854–1857). "Nauplia". Dictionary of Greek and Roman Geography. London: John Murray.
