= List of former mosques in Greece =

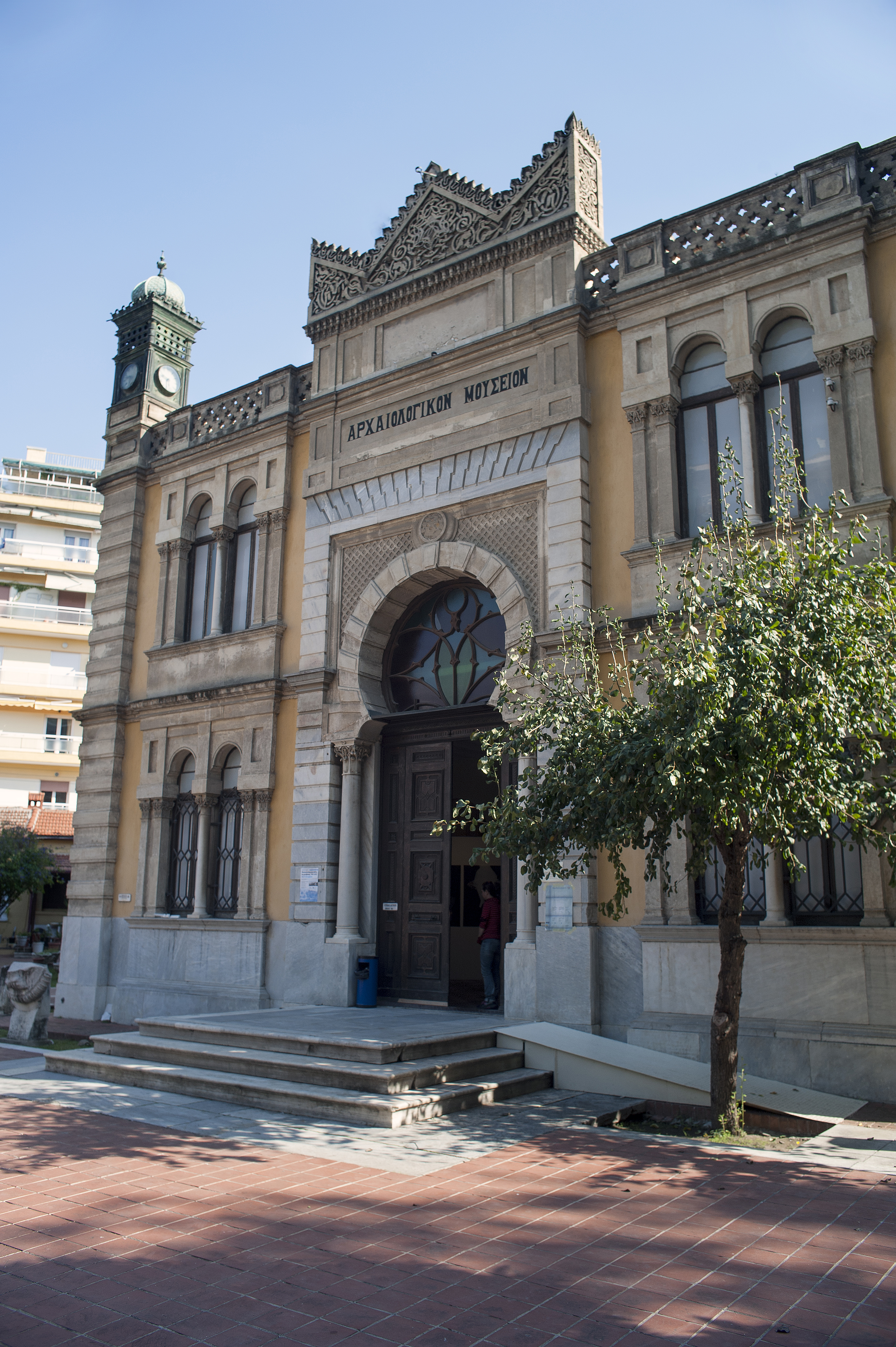
The Yeni Mosque, Thessaloniki once served as the city's archaeological museum.

This is a list of former mosques in Greece. It lists former mosques (Arabic: مَسْجِد, romanized: masjid, Greek: τζαμί, romanized: tzamí, Turkish: cami) and places of worship for Muslims in Greece. It lists some, but by no means all, of the old historical mosques of Greece. The term former mosque in this list includes any Muslim mosque (building) or site used for Islamic prayer (Salah) in Greece, but is no longer.

Mosques have existed within the modern Greece borders since the era of the Emirate of Crete (824–961). But no mosques of the Emirate remain as they were torn down and remaining Muslims were either killed, enslaved or converted to Christianity after the Byzantine reconquest of Crete (961). Therefore, currently the oldest mosque in Greece and the entire Balkan peninsula is believed to be the Çelebi Sultan Mehmed Mosque, the first in Didymoteicho (Western Thrace), built between 1389 and 1402.

Most of the listed former mosques date from the late 14th century to the early 20th century, when various parts of modern Greece were at some point a part of the Ottoman Empire. Beyond the new mosques built during the Ottoman period, several Christian churches throughout Greece were also converted to mosques over time upon conquest, like the church of Hagios Demetrios in Thessalonica. Those were gradually converted to churches following Greece's independence and annexation of other regions.

Many Ottoman mosques and other Muslim monuments, especially in southern Greece, were either destroyed during the Greek War of Independence in the 1820s and successive wars and conflicts. During periods of nationalist uprising and wars against the Ottoman and later the Turkish army, the newly independent Greek nation showed little respect for the monuments of a faith identified with the enemy. Several Ottoman mosques were confiscated and repurposed for use as churches, government offices, and other civilian purposes.

Many more mosques in Greece were closed or abandoned due to the 1923 Population exchange between Greece and Turkey; as a result, 355,000 to 400,000 Muslims left Greece, most of them forcibly made to leave their lands, livelihoods, and mosques.

Many former mosques and other religious buildings also survived in the provinces of Macedonia, Thrace, Crete, and the Dodecanese Island, which were integrated into the Greek State in the early 20th century. By then, there was already a law to protect religious buildings of all faiths.

The surviving former mosques or other religious structures are nowadays protected as monuments. Many of them are still used as government buildings and churches, while many others have been restored and used as museums, exhibition, concert centers and tourist attractions.

== Mosque buildings ==
=== Attica and Central Greece ===
List of former mosques in Attica that encompasses the entire metropolitan area of Athens, and the rest of Central Greece which encompasses Attica.

Name	Image	City	Date opened	Date closed	Notes	Ref.
Emir Zade Mosque		Chalcis	15th century	1821	After the Greek War of Independence in 1821 it was converted into a barracks and later declared a historical monument. Today it houses part of the medieval archaeological collection of Chalcis.	
Fethiye Mosque Museum		Athens	15th century	1830	One of the most important monuments from the Ottoman Greece period still exists in Athens. The mosque was reportedly first opened in the 15th century on the ruins of a Byzantine Christian basilica. The current mosque was built in 1668–1670. The mosque was repurposed after 1834 Greek independence and fell into disrepair. It has been renovated and opened to the public for cultural exhibitions since 2017.	
Gazi Omer Bey Mosque		Livadeia	Late 15th century	1830	After the city was conquered in 1460, Omer Bey erected the mosque in the bazaar district. Since 2015, the mosque has belonged to the municipality of Livadeia, which intends to restore it project and create a cultural place.	
Parthenon mosque		Athens	Early 18th century	1843	After the destruction of the Parthenon, which was already used as a mosque, in 1687, a smaller, free-standing mosque was erected inside the ruined shell of the temple. It was itself demolished in 1843, over a decade after Greece had achieved independence.	
Tzistarakis Mosque — Annexe of Museum of Greek Folk Art		Athens	1759	1830	Mosque built by Mustafa Agha Tzisdarakis, the Ottoman governor or commander of Athens Fortress in the heart of town market in Monastiraki Square. After Greece's independence in 1830, mosque was used for various purposes. The state restored it in 1918 and are using it as a museum.	

=== Central Macedonia ===
List of former mosques in Central Macedonia administrative region.

Name	Image	City	Date opened	Date closed	Notes	Ref. —
Ahmed Bey Mosque		Giannitsa	c. 1450		In partial ruins	
Alaca Imaret Mosque	English: Alatza Imaret in Thessaloniki	Thessaloniki	1484 or 1487		Today the building is being used for temporary exhibitions, artistic and cultural events.	
Hamza Bey Mosque		Thessaloniki	15th century		Since 1923, the minaret was removed and the building no longer functioned as a mosque. It was taken over by the Greek Ministry of Culture in 2006.	
Hünkar Mosque		Edessa	16th century	post-1912	During the interwar period, the mosque was used as a warehouse, barracks, stables, and finally a cinema. Today hosts the "Alexander the Great" cultural center. Restoration work on the interior is ongoing.	
Iskender Bey Mosque		Giannitsa	1481–1512	1912	Commissioned by Iskender Bey Evrenosoğlu, grandson of Gazi Evrenos. Today it stands in a very poor condition, with its fountain, dome and minaret collapsed.	
Lembet Mosque — Ferideh Hanım Mosque		Thessaloniki	1903	1912	It was the very last mosque to be opened in Thessaloniki in 1903, less than a decade before the Ottomans lost the city to the Kingdom of Greece in 1912 during the Balkan Wars. It was then used by the Greek army for almost a century. Restoration works began in 2011.	
Mahmud Çelebi Mosque		Veria			Not open for worship. The minaret collapsed in 1940, and only the base remains today.	
Pavleion Cultural Center — Medrese Mosque		Veria	After 1430	1920s	After the Ottoman conquest of the city in 1430, the Ottomans converted the church of Saint Paul into the Mosque of Musa Çelebi. That building was torn down, and its material was used for the current structure, erected on the same site. It is Veria's best-preserved former mosque. Acquired by the Greek Orthodox Church in 1936, the building is used as a cultural center for the local church.	
Mehmet Bey Mosque		Serres	1492–1493		Built by Mehmed Bey, son of the grand vizier Gedik Ahmed Pasha in 1492–1493. The mosque and mausoleum of İsmail Bey was left abandoned and ceased to function as a mosque sometime in the late 19th century due to flooding from the nearby river. Neglected and unused today.	
Orta Mosque		Veria	Late 15th century	After 1923	Orta Mosque, or "middle mosque" was built in the centre of the town. The mosque was declared a preserved monument in 1938, but has variously been used as a house, a musical instruments workshop and a stonemason's workshop.. Now it lies abandoned in ruins, with plant life growing all over it.	
St. Paraskeva church — Yakup Bey Mosque		Giannitsa	15th century	1910s	It was built around the 15th century, probably by one of the descendants of Gazi Evrenos, founder of Giannitsa (then Yenice-i Vardar). It was converted into a church in the late 1940s.	
Yeni Mosque		Edessa	Mid 17th century	1920s	The mosque was mentioned by Ottoman traveller Evliya Çelebi, and it is Edessa's sole surviving mosque. The mosque was made into a museum in 1942, and it is open to visitors today.	
Zincirli Mosque		Serres	Late 16th century	Mid 1920s	The architecture and layout of the building are typical of the late 16th century, following the school of Mimar Sinan. The mosque underwent restoration works in 2000, but it is not open for worship.	
Koca Mustafa Pasha Mosque		Serres	early 16th century		Originally featuring minarets, a madrasa, and domes covered with lead, the mosque underwent several modifications over time. Only the central dome remains intact.	

=== Crete ===
List of former mosques in Crete, the largest and most populous of the Greek islands.

Name	Image	City	Date opened	Date closed	Notes	Ref. —
Agha Mosque		Chania	1645	After 1923	Founded by Haseki Ali Agha the year Chania fell to the Ottomans. After the exodus of the Muslim community in 1923, it was used as a knitting factory.	
Ankebut Ahmed Pasha Mosque — Saint John church		Ierapetra	17th century	Post-1912 (?)	Ankebut Ahmed Pasha was an Ottoman commander of the Cretan campaign. The mosque was converted into a church for Saint John. It is one of the two surviving mosques of Ierapetra.	
Ierapetra Mosque — Hamidiye Mosque		Ierapetra	1891		It was probably erected around 1891–1892, perhaps on the site of a previous mosque or a church.	
Kara Musa Pasha Mosque		Rethymno	1660s-1680s	1920s	Converted from an old Venetian monastery, it has been restored and will probably open as a museum of Ottoman Cretan architecture.	
Koules Mosque		Heraklion	Late 1600s		After Crete fell to the Ottomans, several modifications were made to Heraklion's Venetian-built Koules Fortress, including the addition of a mosque. The previous lighthouse was replaced by the minaret, which is the only standing remnant of it today.	
Küçük Hasan Pasha Mosque; Gialisi Mosque	Janissaries Mosque, Chania	Chania	1645		Best preserved former mosque in Chania city. Built by Ottomans honoring Kucuk Hasan Pasha. Presumed to be built on a preexisting Christian temple. The mosque has a large semispherical dome supported by stone arches. The north and west sides house a gallery that is crowned by six small domes. The gallery used to be open, as used in the mosques but was enclosed with arched openings in the late 19th century.	
Neradje Mosque — Narenciye Camii		Rethymno	1890	1924	Following the Greco-Turkish population exchange and the departure of Muslims from Crete, Neradje was used as a music school.	
Valide Sultan Mosque		Rethymno	1650s	1925	Built shortly after the conquest of Rethymno by the Ottomans, it was named in honour of the then valide-sultan (the sultan's mother). Not accessible to the public.	
Veli Pasha Mosque — Paleontological Museum of Rethymno		Rethymno	1651 ?	after 1912	Built very shortly after the fall of Rethymno to the Ottomans, it was heavily damaged during World War II and subsequently restored. Today it houses the Paleontological Museum of Rethymno.	
Yeni Mosque — Saint Titus Cathedral		Heraklion	1869	1925	The original building was a converted church which was destroyed. The current building was erected as a mosque in 1869, and converted into a church in 1925.	

=== Eastern Macedonia and Thrace ===
List of former mosques in Eastern Macedonia and Thrace administrative region.

Name	Image	City	Date opened	Date closed	Notes	Ref.
Arap Mosque		Drama	1850–1875	after 1923	It was left neglected and abandoned for close one hundred years, during which time it was entirely engulfed by other buildings, before restoration works began in 2021.	
Bayezid Mosque — Çelebi Sultan Mehmed Mosque		Didymoteicho	1420	1920	The mosque is considered by Greek government officials one of the most important Muslim monuments in Greece, as it is the oldest mosque on Greek soil, and perhaps the oldest in the Balkans as well. It no longer functions as a mosque, but it is under extensive restoration work.	
Eski Mosque — Saint Nicholas church		Drama	1389–1566	1916	The date of its original construction is unclear, and has been associated with both Sultan Bayezid I and Bayezid II. The Bulgarians, following their annexation of east Macedonia, tore down the minaret and converted the mosque into a church for Saint George.	
Old Music Hall — Halil Bey Mosque		Kavala	1530s	1923	Following the departure of Kavala's Muslims, it was used as a music school and thus dubbed "Music Mosque" or "Old Music". Now functions as a museum.	
Saint Nicholas Church — Ibrahim Pasha Mosque		Kavala	1530	1920s	Once the largest mosque in the town of Kavala, in the early 1920s it was converted into a church.	
Muhammad Ali Pasha Mosque		Kavala	1813	1923	Mosque part of the Imaret complex in Kavala built by and named in honour of Muhammad Ali Pasha, a Kavala native. The imaret now works as a hotel.	
Sadirvan Mosque		Drama	1400s	1920s	Used for 54 years as newspaper headquarters, then renovated in the 2010s. Now used as a cultural and exhibition centre.	
Selvili Mosque		Komotini			Only the half-destroyed minaret remains of the structure, the actual mosque having been long demolished.	
Yunus Bey Mosque		Komotini	Unknown		It is not clear when this mosque was built. It is mostly in a ruinous state, with no roof or doors. It is used as a playground for children.	

=== Epirus ===
List of former mosques in Epirus in northwestern Greece.

Name	Image	City	Date opened	Date closed	Notes	Ref.
Aslan Pasha Mosque		Ioannina	1618		The core of a large Islamic religious-educational complex. Only the mosque, Mendreses (Seminary), Homonym Tourbes (mausoleum), and Mageiria (hearth and home) survive today. Mosque interior is preserved with beautiful Minbar (pulpit) and Mihrab (prayer niche). The museum collection includes artifacts from the era of Ali Pasha, bronze objects, and Islamic books.	
Bayrakli Mosque		Ioannina	Late 15th century	1930	Also called Bayram Pasha Mosque, or Bazaar Mosque or Mosque of Bayezid (likely after Sultan Bayezid II). Possibly the oldest (or second oldest) mosque in Ioannina, as well as one of the biggest and most important for the Muslim community of the town. It was demolished in 1930 so new shops could be built.	
Faik Pasha Mosque		Arta	Mid or late 15th century	1881	It was probably erected on the site of a previous Byzantine church. After Arta's annexation in 1881, it briefly functioned as a church dedicated to Saint John the Russian. It was declared a preserved monument in 1938 and now is under repair works. It is not open for worship.	
Fethiye Mosque		Ioannina	1611		The original mosque was built in 1430, on the site of a church. It was extensively remodelled in 1795 by Ali Pasha of Ioannina, who made it the main mosque of his palace. The graves of Ali's family and of Ali himself are located before the mosque.	
Feyzullah Mosque		Arta	15th century (?)		One of the two surviving mosques in Arta, it was named after its founder, Feyzullah. Although it was declared a preserved archaeological site, it mostly lies in ruins, abandoned and neglected.	
Kaloutsiani Mosque — Kanlı Çeşme Mosque		Ioannina	1740	1913	It was built on the site of an earlier mosque. After Ioannina's annexation by Greece in 1913, it was closed as a mosque and used for profane purposes. It is currently undergoing renovation works.	
Rokka Mosque		Rokka	15th century?	after 1912	One of the eight mosques in and around Arta, like most of them it was completely demolished and no trace of it survives today.	
Sultan Mehmed Mosque		Arta	15th century?	Around 1881	Built on one of the most prominent locations of Arta, Sultan Mehmed Mosque no longer survives as it was destroyed shortly after Arta's liberation in 1881, one of the six mosques in Arta that were demolished.	
Sultan Suleyman Mosque		Konitsa	c. 1540	After 1923	One of the two mosques of Konitsa, and the only extant one. After the departure of the Muslim community of Konitsa in the early 20th century, it was damaged by Christians. It is now in a ruinous state, though the nearby türbe (mausoleum) is well-preserved.	
Veli Pasha Mosque		Ioannina	16th century	1913	Originally built by Veli Pasha of Ioannina on the site of a Byzantine church dedicated to Saint Stephen. Shortly after Greece's annexation of Ioannina in 1913, it was converted into a barracks. Today it houses the National Defense Museum of Ioannina	

=== North Aegean ===
List of former mosques located in the North Aegean, an administrative region that contains the northern section of the Aegean Islands, the group of islands in the Aegean Sea between mainland Greece and Turkey.

Name	Image	City	Date opened	Date closed	Notes	Ref.
Bayrakli Mosque — Hamidiye Mosque		Chios	1892	1923	Built by order of Sultan Abdul Hamit II, as was the Osmaniye Mosque. It housed some refugee families after the population exchange. Used as a repair shop for electronics, it was renovated in 2018–2023.	
Chios Byzantine Museum — Mecidiye Mosque		Chios	19th century	After 1923	The mosque served the Turkish community of the island of Chios before they were forced to leave during the population exchange. During the years 2006 to 2010 the museum underwent repair work, so it remained closed. The museum houses Christian and Byzantine sculptures in its yard, as well as exhibits from the Genoese and Ottoman periods.	
Kastro Mosque		Myrina			Located in the castle-fortress of Myrina, principal town of Lemnos island. Remains are in ruinous state.	
Parakoila Mosque		Parakoila			The damaged minaret is the sole remnant of an old mosque in the Ottoman graveyard of Parakoila and the only remaining minaret in Lesbos.	
Osmaniye Mosque		Chios	1892	1923	The mosque was officially registered by Greek Ministry of Culture as a cultural landmark on January 21, 1983. In 1997, the mosque was repaired and renovated by the Greek government and made available for hosting exhibitions and various cultural events.	
Sigri Mosque — Hagia Triada		Sigri			Located in Sigri, a village in Lesbos island. A two-storey building that now serves as a church dedicated to the Holy Trinity.	
Valide Mosque		Mytilene	1615		Located in Epano Skala which was a predominantly Turkish section within the port city of Mytilene, the capital of Lesbos Island. The mosque is a stone-built, one-story building with a marble staircase. Features a stone-paved front yard with a fountain embellished with engraved arabesques. The interior roof of the mosque used to be colorfully painted but the roof was painted brown after the Turks left the city. Now functions as a history museum.	
Yeni Mosque		Mytilene	c. 1825	after 1923	Located in Epano Skala like Valide Mosque, which was a predominantly Turkish section within the port city of Mytilene, the capital of Lesbos Island. After the population exchange, the Turkish community of Lesbos departed. The mosque was restored in 2011.	

=== South Aegean ===
List of former mosques located in the South Aegean, an administrative region that contains the southern section of the Aegean Islands, the group of islands in the Aegean Sea between mainland Greece and Turkey. The vast majority of those mosques are located in Rhodes and Kos, two islands with an active Muslim community.

Name	Image	City	Date opened	Date closed	Notes	Ref.
Atik Mosque		Kos	1310; 1892 (renovation)		Minaret was destroyed in a 1933 earthquake. Now used as a photography studio and warehouse.	
Eski Mosque — Bab Gedid Mosque, Yeni Kapı Mosque		Kos	1586 or 1777	1933	Built some years after the island's conquest, and quite possibly the oldest Ottoman monument in Kos. Was damaged badly during a 1933 earthquake and finally demolished two years later. Today only its minaret remains.	
Gazi Hasan Pasha Mosque; Loggia Mosque		Kos	1776–1786	Mid 20th century	Located next to the legendary Tree of Hippocrates. Not to be confused with the similarly named Gazi Hasan Pasha Mosque which is also in Kos, and unlike this one, still open for worship.	
Hamza Bey Mosque		Rhodes	19th century	20th century	It is one of the smaller and simpler mosques on Rhodes. Today it is not open for worship, but has been restored.	
Kastellorizo Folk Art Museum — Kavos Mosque		Kastellorizo	1775	1948	Originally built on the site of a Christian church, since 2007 it houses the Historical Collection of Kastellorizo, encompassing of several photographic and document material.	
Mehmet Aga Mosque		Rhodes	1819	Mid 20th century	Built on one of the busiest streets of Rhodes. Remodelled and renovated several time since its erection, not open for worship.	
Moruk Mosque		Kos	1892 (reconstruction)		Named after Morukzade Effendi who commissioned it on an unknown date, and renovated in 1892 by Hadji Hasan Riza. Rented for commercial purposes by the Muslim community.	
Murat Reis Mosque		Rhodes	1623	Mid 20th century	Built in honour of Ottoman admiral Murat Reis the Elder. Renovated several times in the past, though still in need of restoration.	
Mustafa Pasha Mosque		Rhodes	1764–5	Open on occasions	Built by Sultan Mustafa III, today the mosque is openly used as a wedding office for the Muslim community of the island.	
Recep Pasha Mosque		Rhodes	1588		It has been left neglected in a ruinous state, as part after part collapsed, due to lack of funds. The portico and the minaret no longer survive.	
Sadirvan Mosque		Rhodes	1887-8		Located within the old fortress and built by Faralyalizade Hadji Hafiz Hussein. It is now used as storagehouse for the market shops.	
Suleymaniye Mosque		Rhodes	1808		Built on the site of an older mosque. It currently functions as a museum.	

=== Thessaly ===
List of former mosques in Thessaly administrative region near central Greece. The region was under the Ottoman controls for four and a half centuries, until 1881. As such many former mosques still remain intact.

Name	Image	City	Date opened	Date closed	Notes	Ref.
Bayrakli Mosque		Larissa	15-16th Century	Late 19th century	The mosque is situated in the centre of the city. It means "mosque of the flag-bearer", apparently derived from the fact that its imam used to hoist a flag (bayrak) to give the signal for the other mosques to begin the call the faithful to prayer.	
Elassona Mosque — Muharrem Pasha Mosque		Elassona	17th/18th century		For some time, the building was used to store parts of the Elassona archaeological collection.	
Hassan Bey Mosque		Larissa		1908	Built by the banks of the Penios river next to the bridge, perhaps on the site of a previous church. The roof was lead-covered. It was demolished in the early 20th century.	
Osman Shah Mosque		Trikala	1550s		The mosque is no longer used for worship; it now functions as a venue for minor events and is a protected UNESCO site. It is the only work of Ottoman imperial architect Mimar Sinan that lies in modern Greece.	
Velestino Mosque		Velestino		1880s	One of the three mosques of Velestino (Pherae), built next to the Hypereia spring. It was destroyed after Thessaly's liberation in 1881, its materials used for a new church. Its minaret stood for a while until 1926.	
Yeni Mosque	20111009 Yeni Tzami former seat of the Archeological Museum Larissa Thessaly Greece	Larissa	Before 1881	After 1924	Its exact date of construction, as well as its founder, are unknown, but the neoclassical decoration both on the exterior as well as in the interior point to sometime in the 19th century. It was the last of several mosques built in the city under Ottoman rule, whence its name. From the late 1950s until 2011 the building housed the Larissa Archaeological Museum.	

=== Western Greece and Peloponnese ===
List of former mosques in Western Greece and Peloponnese administrative regions.

Name	Image	City	Date opened	Date closed	Notes	Ref.
Ahmed III Mosque — Ahmet Pasha Mosque		Acrocorinth	1715	1821	It was built by Sultan Ahmed III upon the recapture of Morea, hence the name. Although renovation works have taken place, it is mostly in a very poor condition.	
Fethiye Mosque		Nafpaktos	1499		Situated on the waterfront near the eastern side of the port. Built by Ottoman Sultan Beyazid II shortly after the capture of Nafpaktos from the Venetians. Open only for occasional temporary exhibitions.	
Methoni minaret		Methone			Located inside the Methoni Castle, it was built on top of the church of St. John the Theologian, or it was the converted church itself. Now only the minaret survives.	
Monemvasia Mosque		Monemvasia	c. 1541	1830	The mosque was built shortly after the Ottoman conquest of the Morea in the sixteenth century. Shortly after the Greek War of Independence in 1821 it was used as a prison, and later as a cafe. Today it functions as a museum and houses the Archaeological Collection of Monemvasia.	
Saints Constantine and Helen church — Beshir Agha Mosque ?		Argos	1570–1600	1871	Only surviving mosque in Argos (out of two), built in the late 16th century. Its original name is a matter of dispute. It was converted into a church in 1871 following Greece's independence without major alterations.	
Sultan Mehmed Khan Mosque; Fethiye Mosque		Acrocorinth	Late 15th century		Old basilica-monastery in the Acrocorinth converted into a mosque after Corinth's conquest. A minaret was added, whose base is all that remains of it today.	
Transfiguration of the Saviour church — Iç Kale Mosque		Nafplio	19th century	1839	Local historiography attributes its founding to Fatme, widow of Agha Pasha of Nafplio. It was converted into a Catholic church in 1839, shortly after independence.	
Transfiguration of the Saviour church — Murad III Mosque		Pylos	c. 1577	1842	Its construction was authorised by Sultan Murad III. It was converted to a church by the Venetians before becoming a mosque again. It was finally converted into an Orthodox church in 1842 after Greece's independence.	
Trianon Cinema — Trianon Mosque		Nafplio	1666-7 (?)	1823	It is a gray, stone building in the Syntagma Square. During the Greek War of Independence it was used as a school for orphaned children and it was used so for more than half a century. Today it functions as a cinema and an exhibitions hall.	
Vizier Mosque — Amcazade Hussein Pasha Mosque		Nafpaktos	1701–2		Part of a larger complex that included baths and a fountain. Its few remains now lie in a ruinous state.	
Vouleftikon — Agha Pasha Mosque	Βουλευτικόν, Ναύπλιο 7799	Nafplio	1730		Mosque built as a gray stone building off the Nafplion Syntagma Square. After Greek take over, it housed the first Greek People's Assembly, which met here for the first time in 1825 and later even as a prison. It's now fully restored but open to the public only for concerts in the former main hall of the mosque. Connected to the mosque in the back is the Medrese (English: Madrasa) building which used to be a Turkish Islamic religious school.	

=== Western Macedonia ===
List of former mosques in Western Macedonia administrative region.

Name	Image	City	Date opened	Date closed	Notes	Ref.
Kursum Mosque		Kastoria	16th century	1924	It served the Muslim community for centuries before Kastoria was annexed by Greece. The first library of Kastoria was housed inside the mosque for some years starting in 1925, then it became a warehouse of antiquities for many decades until recently. It is the only mosque of Kastoria that was not demolished, as all the others were.	

== Formerly converted non-Islamic buildings ==
List of former mosques in previously non-Islamic buildings, mostly churches, which have been converted back or no longer exist.

=== Attica ===
Formerly converted buildings in Attica.

Name	Image	City	Date converted	Date closed	Notes
Parthenon		Athens	before 15th century	1830	Before being converted to a mosque, it had functioned as the church of Panagia Atheniotissa. After its destruction in 1687, a smaller mosque was erected within the ruined shell. Now an archaeological site, part of the Acropolis of Athens UNESCO World Heritage Site.

=== Central Macedonia ===
Formerly converted buildings in Central Macedonia.

Name	Image	City	Date converted	Date closed	Notes
Acheiropoietos — Eski Cami		Thessaloniki	1430	1912	Converted by order of Murad II himself, who conquered Thessaloniki in 1430. Part of the Paleochristian and Byzantine monuments of Thessaloniki.
Hagia Sophia — Ayasofya Camii		Thessaloniki	1430	1912	Part of the Paleochristian and Byzantine monuments of Thessaloniki.
Hagios Demetrios — Kasımiye Camii		Thessaloniki	1490	1912	Part of the Paleochristian and Byzantine monuments of Thessaloniki. Hagios Demetrios is the largest church in Thessaloniki.
Holy Apostles — Soğuksu Camii		Thessaloniki	c. 1520 – c. 1530	1912	Part of the Paleochristian and Byzantine monuments of Thessaloniki.
Hosios David — Soluca Camii		Thessaloniki	after 1430	1912	Part of the Paleochristian and Byzantine monuments of Thessaloniki.
Old Metropolis — Hünkar Camii		Veria	c. 1430	1912	
Pammegistoi Taxiarches — İki Şerefiye Camii		Thessaloniki	after 1430	1912	
Panagia Chalkeon — Kazancilar Camii		Thessaloniki	1430	1912	Part of the Paleochristian and Byzantine monuments of Thessaloniki.
Prophet Elijah — Saraylı Camii		Thessaloniki	1430	1912	Part of the Paleochristian and Byzantine monuments of Thessaloniki.
Saint Catherine — Yakup Paşa Camii		Thessaloniki	between 1481 and 1512	1912	Part of the Paleochristian and Byzantine monuments of Thessaloniki.
Saint George — Suleyman Hortaci Effendi Camii		Thessaloniki	c. 1430	1912	Now the archaeological monument of Rotunda of Galerius, and part of the Paleochristian and Byzantine monuments of Thessaloniki.
Saint Panteleimon — İshakiye Camii		Thessaloniki	1548	1912	Part of the Paleochristian and Byzantine monuments of Thessaloniki.
Saints Peter and Paul		Chalkidona	15th century	After 1912	Built around the 10th century, originally belonging to the Slavic-speaking Bogomils. The remains of the minaret are still visible.

=== Crete ===
Formerly converted churches in Crete.

Name	Image	City	Date converted	Date closed	Notes
Saint Mark — Defterdar Ahmet Pasha Mosque		Heraklion	1669	1915	Originally a Roman Catholic church built during the Venetian rule of the island, it was converted into a mosque upon Ottoman conquest. In 1960 it opened again, but as an art gallery, instead of a church.
Saint Nicholas — Hünkar Mosque		Chania	17th century	1918	Only church in Greece with both a belltower and a minaret.

=== Eastern Macedonia and Thrace ===
Formerly converted churches in Eastern Macedonia and Thrace.

Name	Image	City	Date converted	Date closed	Notes
Hagia Sophia — Bey Camii		Drama	10th century	1913	Originally dedicated to the Dormition of the Mother of God, it was renamed to Hagia Sophia ("holy wisdom") by Greek refugees from Turkey arriving in Drama following the population exchange.
Theotokos Kosmosoteira — Suleyman Pasha Camii		Feres	before 1433	1920	

=== Peloponnese and Western Greece ===
Formerly converted churches in the Peloponnese and West Greece.

Name	Image	City	Date converted	Date closed	Notes
Brontochion Monastery		Mystras	Late 15th century	1830	
Hagia Sophia — Ayasofya Camii		Mystras	Late 15th century	1830	Originally dedicated to Jesus Christ the Life Giver, was probably renamed after the Fall of Constantinople. World Heritage Site along with the rest of Mystras.
Holy Apostles		Leontari	1458	After 1821	14th-century Byzantine church. During its conversion, a portico and a minaret were added whose remains are still visible.
Panagia Hodegetria — Fethiye Camii		Monemvasia	c. 1540	1830	The most prominent church of Monemvasia. After Greece's independence, it was renamed to Hagia Sophia.
Pantocrator — Kursun Camii		Patras	Late 1500s	1821	Today on the site stands the larger new Pantocrator church of Patras.
Saint Roch		Corone	Late 15th/early 16th century	After 1828	Originallly a Venetian Catholic church. After Greece's independence, it was renamed to Saint Charalampus. The remains of the minaret support the new bell tower.

=== South Aegean ===
Formerly converted churches in the South Aegean.

Name	Image	City	Date converted	Date closed	Notes
Hagios Spyridon — Kavaklı Camii		Rhodes	after 1522	mid 1900s	One of the several churches within the medieval town of Rhodes to become a mosque.
Holy Trinity — Dolapli Camii		Rhodes	After 1522	c. 1947	A 15th-century church within the old medieval town of Rhodes, one of the two dedicated to the Holy Trinity.
Holy Trinity — Khan Zade Mascidi		Rhodes	c. 1522	1947	The other Rhodian church of the Holy Trinity. Originally dedicated to Archangel Michael.
Panagia tou Kastrou — Enderun Camii		Rhodes	c. 1522	c. 1941	It was also converted into a Roman Catholic church during the Middle Ages
Saint Athanasius — Bab-i Mesdud Mescidi		Rhodes	After 1522		15th-century church inside the old medieval town, one of the several that were converted into mosques after the Ottoman conquests. Its old mihrab is still preserved inside.
Saint Catherine — Ilk Mihrap Camii		Rhodes	c. 1522		The first Orthodox church building in Rhodes to be converted into a mosque by orders of Sultan Suleyman.
Saint George — Hurmali Mescidi		Rhodes	After 1522		Originally a Byzantine church dedicated to Saint Mark, it was converted into a mosque by one Ibrahim Efendi. It was probably built in the 14th or 15th century, on the site of a paleo-Christian church, itself on top of an ancient Greek temple.
Saint John of the Collachium		Rhodes	1522	1856 (its destruction)	Converted into a mosque after the Ottoman conquest of Rhodes, destroyed in 1856 after a gunpowder explosion; now in ruins.
Saint Kyriake — Borazanî Baba Camii		Rhodes	After 1522		Named after Borizen Ali Baba, who took part in the Rhodian campaign as the chief trumpeter. It has gone through various waves of restoration. Its construction dates to the 15th century.
Unknown church — Abdul Celil Camii		Rhodes	After 1522		An unidentified church, perhaps a Latin building of the 15th century. Now it lies in ruins.

== See also ==
- Islam in Greece
- List of mosques in Greece
- List of the oldest mosques in the world

== Sources ==
- Ameen, Ahmed (2017). Islamic architecture in Greece: Mosques. Alexandria, Egypt: Center for Islamic Civilization studies, Bibliotheca Alexandrina.
- Ameen, Ahmed (2019). "Patrons of Ottoman mosques in Greece reconsidered in light of the Ierapetra mosque of Crete". Journal of Islamic Architecture. 5 (3). ISSN 2086-2636.
- Canard, M. (1971). "Iḳrīṭis̲h̲". In Lewis, B.; Ménage, V. L.; Pellat, Ch. & Schacht, J. (eds.). The Encyclopaedia of Islam, Second Edition. Volume III: H–Iram. Leiden: E. J. Brill. pp. 1082–1086. OCLC 495469525.
- Cantoro, Gianluca; Sythiakaki, Vassiliki; Manolioudis, Stelios (July 2016). "Visualizing Structural Issues Through Photogrammetric 3D Documentation of Cultural Heritage: The Venetian Sea-Fortress at Herakleion, Crete, Greece". In Chalikias, Konstantinos; Beeler, Maggie; Pearce, Ariel; Renette, Steve (eds.). The Future of the Past: From Amphipolis to Mosul, New Approaches to Cultural Heritage Preservation in the Eastern Mediterranean. Philadelphia: University of Pennsylvania Museum of Archaeology and Anthropology.
- Economides, Nikolaos (1988). Βογομιλικά κατάλοιπα κοντά στη Θεσσαλονίκη [Bogomilic Remains Near Thessaloniki] (in Greek). Athens, Greece: Christian Archaeological Society.
- Kasdagli, Anna-Maria (2018). Coins in Rhodes: From the Monetary Reform of Anastasius I Until the Ottoman Conquest (498–1522). Oxford: Archaeopress. ISBN 9781784918422.
- Kaymakçı, Mustafa; Özgün, Cihan (2018). The Forgotten Turkish Identity of the Aegean Islands. Konya: Eğitim Yayınevi. ISBN 9786057557117.
- Kazhdan, Alexander (1991). "Anemas". In Kazhdan, Alexander (ed.). The Oxford Dictionary of Byzantium. Oxford and New York: Oxford University Press. p. 96. ISBN 0-19-504652-8.
- Kiel, Machiel (2016). "Corinth in the Ottoman period (1458-1687 and 1715-1821): the afterlife of a great ancient Greek and Roman metropolis»" (PDF). Shedet. 3 (5). ISSN 2356-8704. Archive.
- Kolovos, Elias (2015). "Monuments sans héritiers? Les édifices ottomans de Crète". Anatoli (in French). 6: Patrimoines culturels et fait minoritaire en Turquie et dans les Balkans.
- Kontogiannis, Nikos D.; Grigoropoulou, Ioanna M.; Barmparitsa, Eleni; Sakkari, Sophia; Moutafi, Ioanna; Lagia, Anna; Karali, Lilian (2015). "From Mosque to Church and Back Again: Investigating a House of Faith in Post-Medieval Pylos". Hesperia: The Journal of the American School of Classical Studies at Athens. 84 (4). doi:10.2972/hesperia.84.4.0771.
- Konuk, Neval (2008). Ottoman architecture in Lesvos, Rhodes, Chios and Kos islands. Ankara: The Center for Strategic Research. ISBN 978-9757307693.
- Loukma, Maria (2019). Τεχνολογία, υλικά δόμησης και παθολογία σε θρησκευτικά κτήρια της Οθωμανικής περιόδου [Technology, construction materials and pathology in religious buildings of the Ottoman period] (PDF) (Thesis) (in Greek). Thessaloniki, Greece: Aristotle University of Thessaloniki.
- Marge, Anastasia I.; Matskani, Anna S. (2007). Η οθωμανική αρχιτεκτονική στην πόλη της Βέροιας [The Ottoman architecture in the city of Veroia]. Αρχαιολογία και Τέχνες (in Greek) (105). ISSN 1108-2402.
- Matsaka, Anthe (2012). Η εξέλιξη του λόφου του Φρουρίου στη Λάρισα (PDF) (Thesis) (in Greek). Aristotle University of Thessaloniki.
- Mikropoulos, Tasos, ed. (2008). Elevating and safeguarding culture using tools of the information society: dusty traces of the Muslim culture. Earthlab. ISBN 960-233-187-9.
- Orlandos, Anastasios (1921). "L'église byzantine des Saints-Apôtres, à Leondári". Revue des Études Grecques (in French). 34 (157).
- Osswald, Brendan Patrick Claude (2008). "From Lieux de Pouvoir to Lieux de Mémoire: The Monuments of the Medieval Castle of Ioannina through the Centuries". In Hálfdanarson, Gudmundur (ed.). Discrimination and tolerance in historical perspective (PDF). Pisa university press. ISBN 978-88-8492-558-9.
- Pantazis, Georgios; Lambrou, Evangelia (2009). "Investigating the orientation of eleven mosques in Greece". Journal of Astronomical History and Heritage. 12 (2): 15–166. Bibcode:2009JAHH...12..159P. doi:10.3724/SP.J.1440-2807.2009.02.08. ISSN 1440-2807. S2CID 55073167.
- Papanikolaou, Prodromos (2017). Tο καθολικό του Αγίου Ιωάννη στο Koλλάκιο εκ νέου. Spolia, ιστορικές πληροφορίες και ερμηνευτικά ζητήματα [The Church of St John in the Collachium Anew: Spolia, Historical Information and Interpretative Issues]. In Triantafyllidis, Paulos (ed.). Το αρχαιολογικό έργο στα νησιά του Αιγαίου. Διεθνές επιστημονικό συνέδριο, Ρόδος, 27 Νοεμβρίου–1 Δεκεμβρίου 2013 [Archaeological Work in the Aegean islands. International Scientific Conference, Rhodes, 27 November –1 December, 2013] (in Greek). Vol. 3. Mytilene: Ministry of Culture and Sport. pp. 501–520. ISBN 9789603863199 – via Academia.edu.
- Setton, Kenneth; Hazard, Harry (1977). A History of the Crusades. Vol. IV: The Art and Architecture of the Crusader States. ISBN 978-0299068240.
- Stavridopoulos, Ioannis (2015). Μνημεία του άλλου: η διαχείριση της οθωμανικής πολιτιστική κληρονομιάς της Μακεδονίας από το 1912 έως σήμερα [Other People's Monuments: the Management of the Ottoman Cultural Heritage of Macedonia from 1912 to the present] (Thesis) (in Greek). Ioannina: University of Ioannina.
- Volanakis, Ioannis (2014). "Τοιχογραφημένοι Ναοί τῆς Δωδεκανήσου (Α΄ Μέρος)" [Frescoed Churches of the Dodecanese (Part I)] (PDF). Dodecanesos (in Greek). Athens, Greece: Eptalophos. ISSN 1792-0507.
- Vrakas, Fotis (2007). Η Ήπειρος του χτες – Η Ήπειρος της οθωμανικής περιόδου 15ος - 20ος [The Epirus of the past - the Epirus of the Ottoman period 15th-20th century] (in Greek).
