= Bab Gedid Mosque =

Historical mosque in Kos, Greece

Coordinates: 36°53′28″N 27°17′10″E

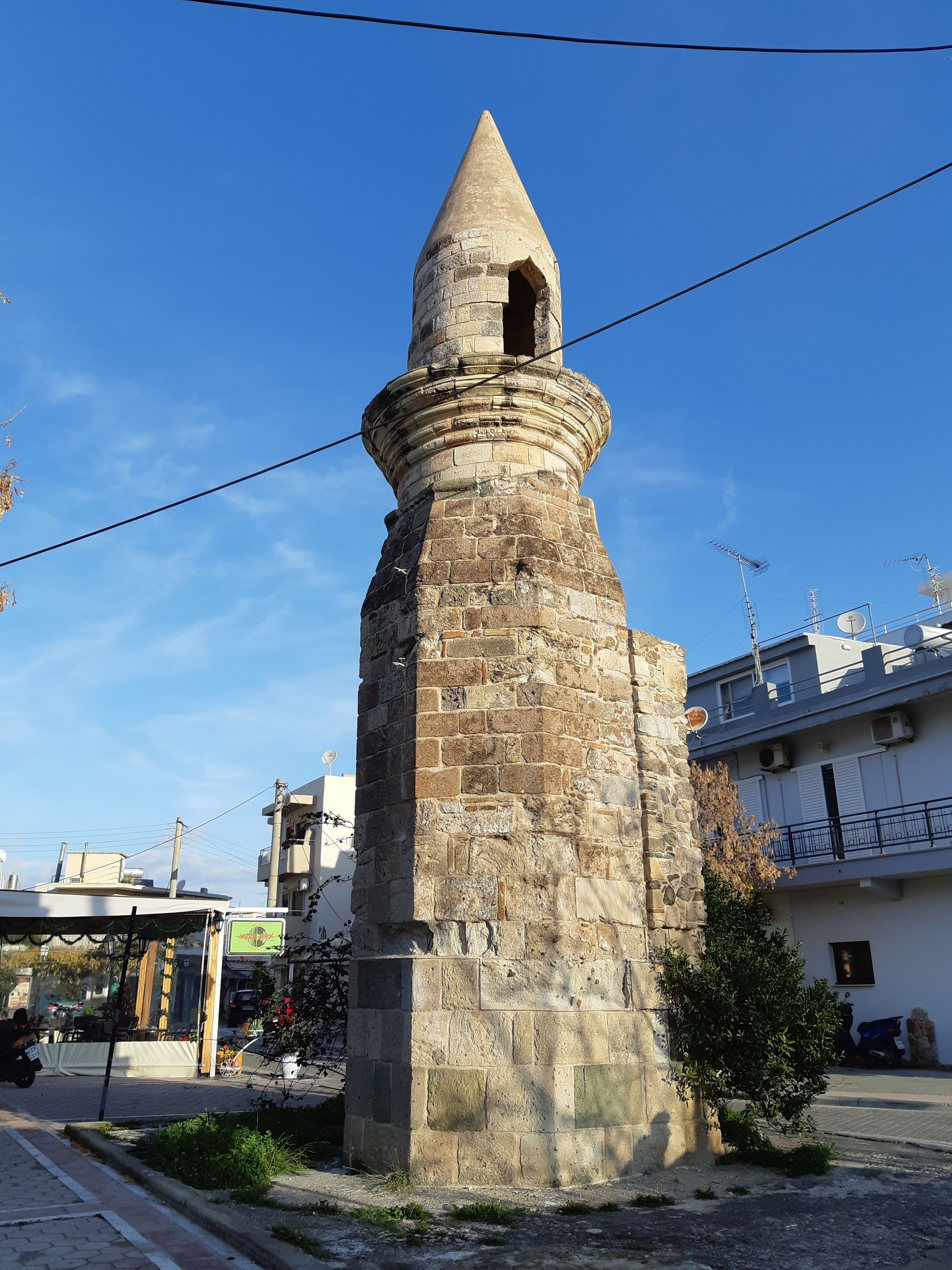
The surviving minaret in 2019.

The Bab Gedid Mosque, also known as the Eski Mosque (Greek: Εσκί Τζαμί, from Turkish: Eski Camii, meaning "the old mosque") was an Ottoman-period mosque on the Aegean island of Kos, in southeastern Greece, before it was badly damaged in an earthquake in 1933 and finally demolished a few years later in 1935. Today its octagonal stone minaret is all that survives from the original structure.

== History ==
According to some plausible—but far from certain—speculations the Bab Gedid Mosque was built in 1586, a few decades after the island's conquest by the Ottomans; if true, that would make the surviving minaret the oldest Ottoman monument on the island. Some more moderate suggestions place its construction (and with certainty its renovation) in 1777 at the end of the bazaar, funded by Mourabit Hadji Moustafa Agha and his wife.

It was located on the hill of the citadel in what is today the Diagoras Square, at the far end of the then-Muslim quarter of Kos town, which was densely built. To the east of the old mosque stood the outdoor fountain which was used for washing and cleansing before the prayer, as well as a small cemetery. Its name, Bab Gedid, translates to "mosque of the new gate," and it was also known as Yeni Kapı Mosque (meaning the same).

The mosque was damaged badly in an earthquake that shook Kos in 1933, and then demolished around 1935, except for its minaret, in order to implement the new town plan.

== Architecture ==
The minaret, the sole surviving element of the Old Mosque, stands tall at 11.35 metres in height, with access from inside; it was erected in an octagonal shape, and it was built on its mosque's northwestern side, in contact with the rest of the structure. In the courtyard a fountain was erected, built on the north side of the minaret, which bears inscription regarding the mosque, giving 1586 as the year of its construction.

== See also ==
- Islam in Greece
- List of former mosques in Greece
- List of mosques in Greece
- Ottoman Greece

== Bibliography ==
- Kaymakçı, Mustafa; Özgün, Cihan (October 20, 2018). The Forgotten Turkish Identity of the Aegean Islands. Konya, Turkey: Eğitim Yayınevi. ISBN 9786057557117.
- Konuk, Neval (2008). Ottoman architecture in Lesvos, Rhodes, Chios and Kos islands. Ankara: The Center for Strategic Research. ISBN 978-9757307693.
