= Mehmet Agha Mosque =

Former mosque in Rhodes, Greece

- Μεχμέτ Αγά Τζαμί
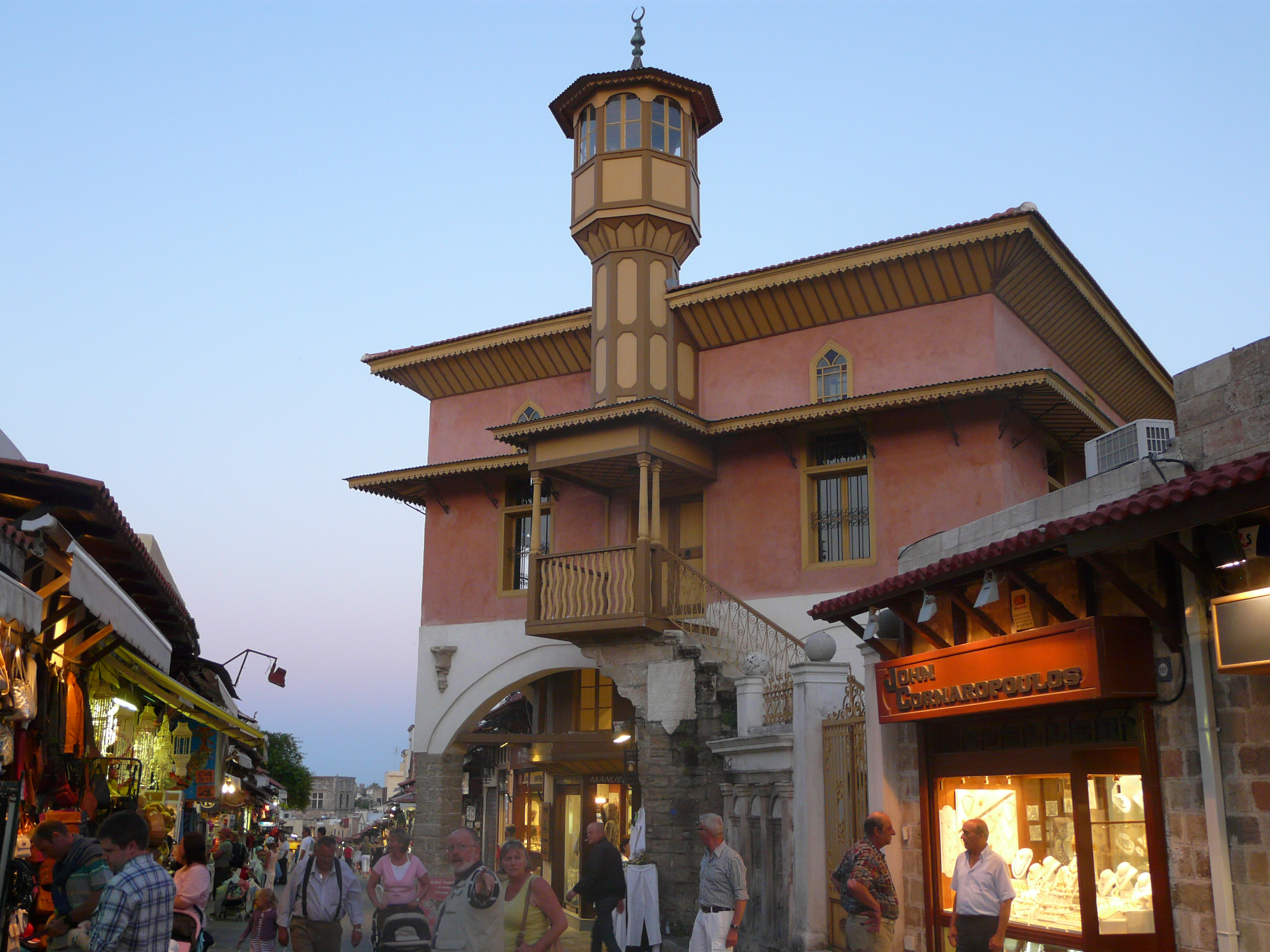

- Location of the former mosque in Greece

Religion
- Affiliation: Islam (former)
- Ecclesiastical or organizational status: Mosque (1819–1940s)
- Status: Abandoned (as a mosque)

Location
- Location: Rhodes, South Aegean
- Country: Greece
- Interactive map of Mehmet Agha Mosque
- Coordinates: 36°26′37″N 28°13′34″E

Architecture
- Type: Mosque
- Style: Ottoman
- Completed: 1819

Specifications
- Minarets: 1 (original removed, 1970s; replaced with timber)
- Materials: Brick; stone; wood

The Mehmet Agha Mosque (Greek: Μεχμέτ Αγά Τζαμί, from Turkish: Mehmet Ağa Camii) is a former mosque, located on Sokratous street within the old walled town of Rhodes, on the eponymous island, in the South Aegean region of southern Greece. Built in 1819 during the Ottoman era, the mosque was abandoned, most likely in the 1940s, and it is not open for worship.

== History ==
The Mehmet Agha Mosque has gone through several phases of development throughout its existence, whether in respect of its architectural, ornamental, inscriptional elements or others. It was built on the site of an older, ruined mosque in 1819, and it was extensively remodelled in 1875 following the earthquake of 1856. It was heavily damaged during World War II, and subsequently restorations were carried out in 1948. In the 1970s, the minaret and the balcony, which were in poor condition, were removed. The 2004 renovation notably included the reconstruction of these two elements.

It is considered to be the most popular Ottoman-era former mosque in Rhodes, due to its features and distinguishing look.

== Architecture ==
The mosque belongs to a Bursa I type of building, comprising a square or rectangular area, and the interior covered with a mosque. The Mehmet Agha, however, does not have a dome but rather a wooden gable roof. The mihrab is located in the middle of the qibla wall, a semicircular niche with a diameter of approximately 1 metre (3 ft 3 in), crowned with a trefoil arch. The outer windows are topped with a row of pointed arched rectangular openings. The walls are built with red tuff stone, and have all been re-used in the building. It would appear that the ground flood of the mosque was constructed on the ruins of an old structure built by the Knights Hospitaller, and was not originally a mosque.

It was built with an orientation towards Mecca (thus in rotation with respect to the ground floor), resulting in the need of a support column on the street to be built.

Its current minaret is made out of wood. Nothing remains of the old one, as it was completely renewed by the Greek Ministry of Culture. Its polygonal shape, unlike that of other pencil-like Ottoman minarets, bespeaks of its Arabic influence.

The fountain on the yard was added during the second building period in 1875, and served two functions; the first, as a prayers ablutions prior to the praying, the second as the jeshma (spring) the people in the street had drunk from. The fountain is a wall divided into three horizontal parts, separated with four stone pillars; the marble panels are decorated with geometrical ornaments in the shape of a pointed arch.

== See also ==
- Islam in Greece
- List of former mosques in Greece
- Ottoman Greece

== Bibliography ==
- Konuk, Neval (2008). Ottoman architecture in Lesvos, Rhodes, Chios and Kos islands. Ankara: The Center for Strategic Research. ISBN 978-9757307693.
- Panagiotidi, Maria; Kalopisi, Sophia; Mamaloukos, Stavros (2010). Τα οθωμανικά τεμένη στην παλαιά πόλη της Ρόδου: Σουλτάν Σουλεϊμάν τζαμί, Μουράντ Ρέις τζαμί, Σουλτάν Μουσταφά τζαμί, Μεχμέτ Αγά τζαμί [The Ottoman mosques in the old town of Rhodes island: Sultan Suleiman mosque, Murad Reis mosque, Sultan Mustafa mosque, Mehmet Agha mosque] (Thesis) (in Greek). pp. 23–25. doi:10.12681/eadd/25418.
