= Vizier Mosque =

Mosque ruins in Nafpaktos, Greece

Coordinates: 38°23′44″N 21°49′42″E

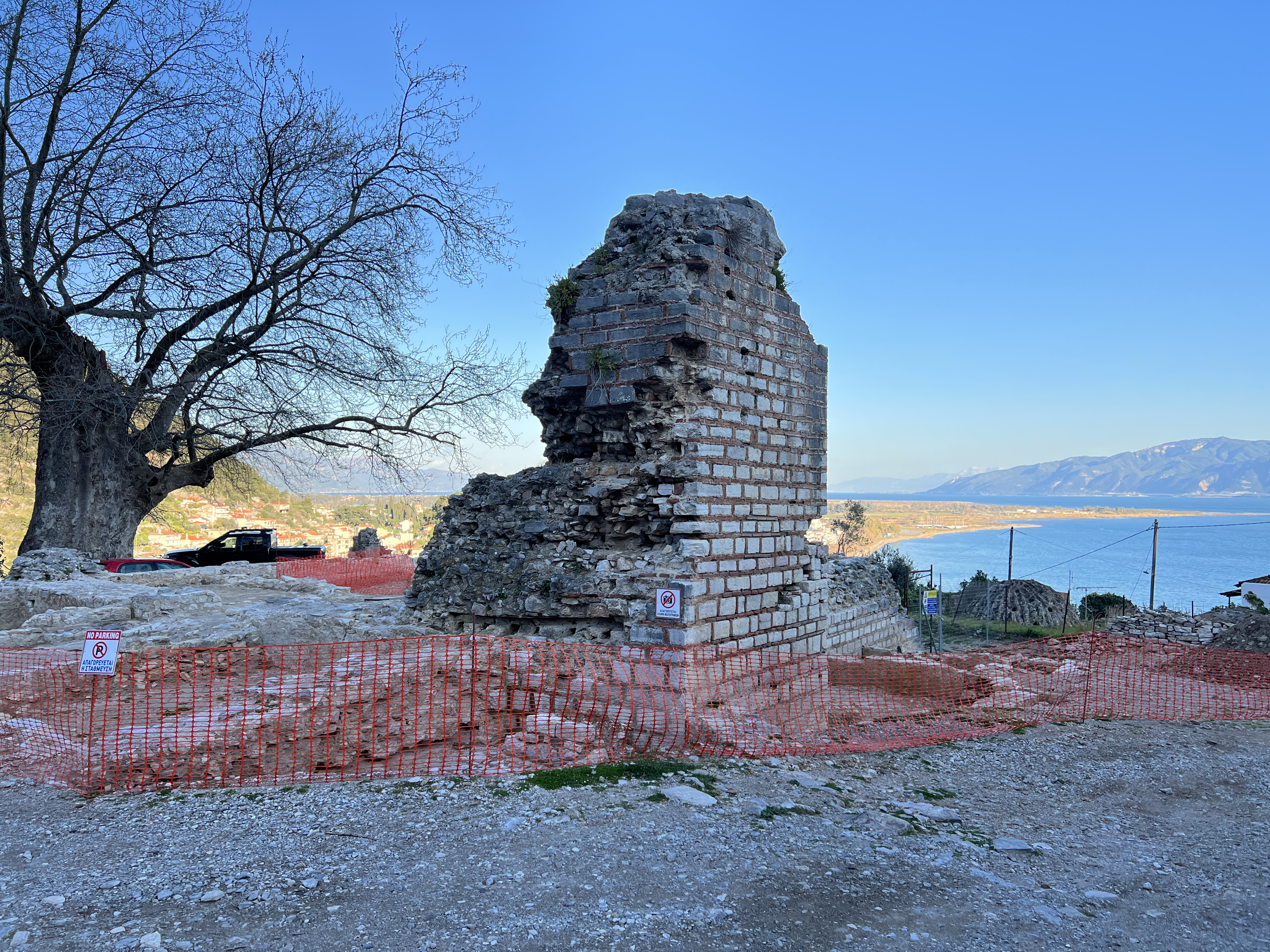
Ruins of the Vezir Mosque, Nafpaktos, Greece.

The Vizier Mosque or Vezir Mosque (Greek: Βεζίρ Τζαμί, lit. 'mosque of the vizier'), also known as the Amcazade Hussein Pasha Mosque (Turkish: Amcazâde Hüseyin Paşa Camii), was an Ottoman mosque in the town of Nafpaktos, in western Central Greece, dating to the late seventeenth or early eighteenth century. Today its few remnants lie entirely in ruins.

== Description ==
The mosque was funded and named after Amcazade Husein Pasha, who was Grand vizier to Ottoman Sultan Mustafa II, and built around 1701–1702. The mosque was part of a larger philanthropic complex that included baths and a fountain, of which only ruins remain; it was built on the site of a previous mosque, called Mosque of the Wells.

Today, only the eastern wall forming the base of the collapsed minaret remains. The cloisonné masonry, a technique which consists of surrounding each stone with bricks, is still visible in the remaining ruins. The bricks used measure about 20 cm across, and about 3–5 cm thick. The mortar used on the minaret's exterior was pinkish/reddish in colour.

In 2020, renovation works for the remaining structures were approved by the Greek Ministry of Culture and Sports, which were carried out in the same and following year.

== See also ==
- Islam in Greece
- List of former mosques in Greece
- List of mosques in Greece
- Ottoman Greece

== Bibliography ==
- Ameen, Ahmed (2017). Islamic architecture in Greece: Mosques. Alexandria: Center for Islamic Civilization studies, Bibliotheca Alexandrina.
- Mikropoulos, Tasos (2008). Elevating and safeguarding culture using tools of the information society: dusty traces of the muslim culture. Earthlab. ISBN 960-233-187-9.
