= Zincirli Mosque, Serres =

Former mosque in Serres, Central Macedonia, Greece

Zincirli Mosque
- Ζινζιρλί Τζαμί
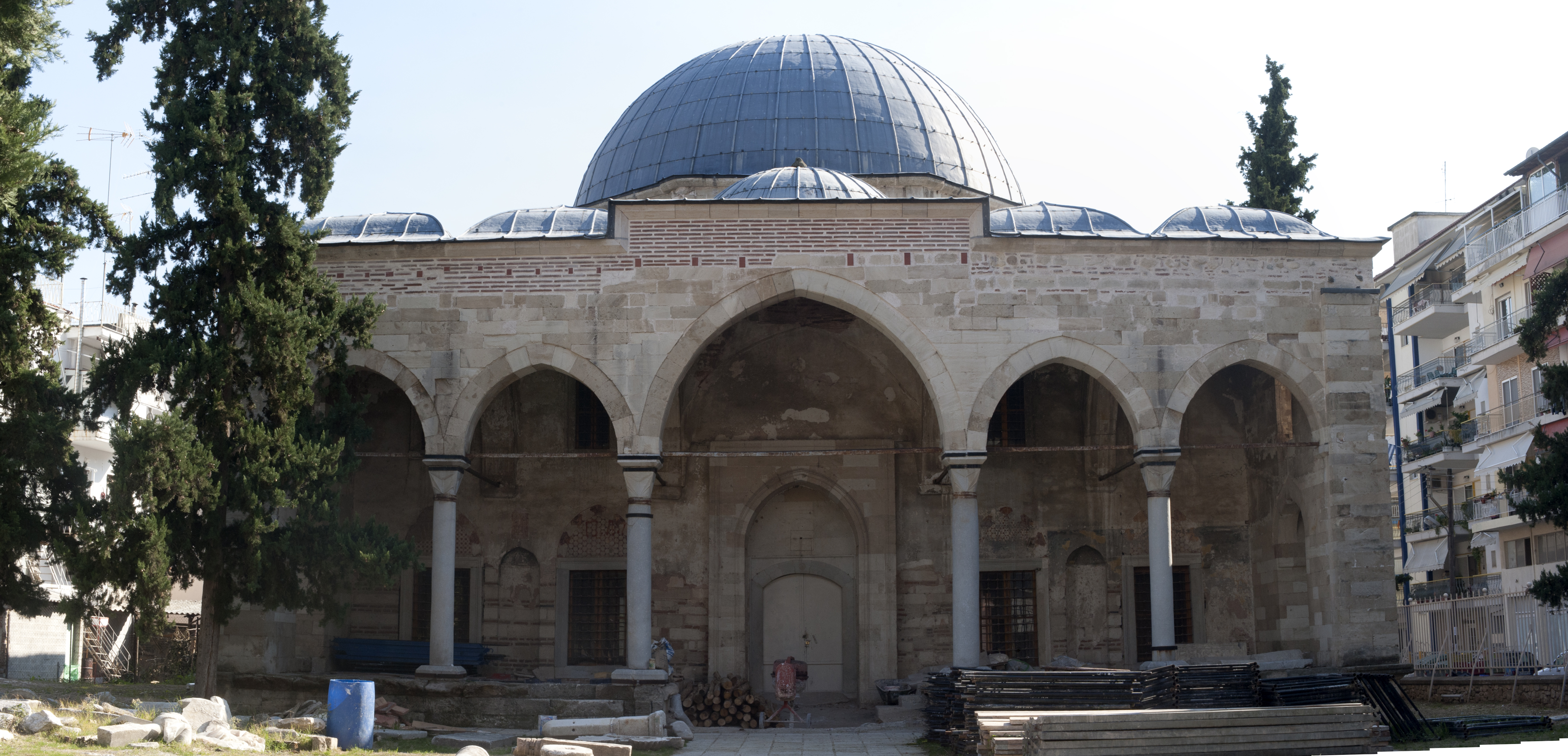
- Front view of the former mosque in 2011

- Location of the former mosque in Greece

Religion
- Affiliation: Islam (former)
- Ecclesiastical or organizational status: Mosque (16th century–1912)
- Status: Abandoned (as a mosque); Restored

Location
- Location: Serres, Central Macedonia
- Country: Greece
- Interactive map of Zincirli Mosque
- Coordinates: 41°05′17″N 23°33′13″E

Architecture
- Architect: Mimar Sinan
- Type: Mosque
- Style: Ottoman
- Completed: late 16th century

Specifications
- Domes: 1 (main); Many (smaller)
- Materials: Brick; stone; marble; limestone ashlar

The Zincirli Mosque, officially the Zinzirli Mosque (Greek: Ζινζιρλί Τζαμί, meaning "mosque of the chains" in Turkish), is a former mosque in the city of Serres in the Central Macedonia region of northern Greece. Completed in the late 16th century during the Ottoman era, the mosque was abandoned in 1912, following the Balkan Wars, and was subsequently renovated.

== History ==
The mosque was built by architect Mimar Sinan (1490-1588), even though the master architect never mentioned this mosque in his lists of works. It was completed in late 16th century, founded by the children of Selçuk Sultan, who ordered mosque in memory of their mother.

Sheets of lead originally covered the ceiling. The mosque became a lumber warehouse in 1913, and was used as an army reserve during World War II, at which point the ceiling's lead was removed.

Historian R. Anhegger viewed the mosque and published its observations in 1967 where he dated the building before the mid-16th century. In 1971, M. Kiel deducted the construction's date to be between 1577 and 1585. According to Maximilian Hartmuth, both historians made their estimates based on the exterior's features, but did not take into consideration historical sources. In 1987, I. Kuniholm and C. L. Striker published the results of their study on wood samples from the mosque, which they dated to 1492. In a book published in 2008, Heath W. Lowry agreed on the 1490s estimation, and also identifying princess Selçuk Sultan (1407-1485) as the patroness of the mosque.

A long renovation process was engaged, and the mosque reopened as a museum in 2014.

The former mosque was restored in 2000, and as of 2021 it was not open for worship.

== Description ==
The former mosque is located in the southwestern corner of the city. Its architecture and layout of the building are typical of the late 16th century, following the school of Mimar Sinan, and analogous to buildings of the same period in Istanbul. A middle-size mosque, it comprises a central, square prayer space with a two-storey colonnaded portico on its eastern, northern, and western sides; the qibla lies in the southern side, while the entrance is from the northern. The central space is covered by a dome, while the porticoes are topped by keel-shaped domes. The pulpit (minbar) is located on the southwestern corner of the building. It is made of marble, and is one of the finest examples surviving in Greece today. The entrance features a column-supported porch topped by small domes above the spaces between the columns. While the main structure's masonry features dressed or rough stones surrounded by bricks, the porch is entirely of carefully dressed limestone ashlars.

The mosque is also called the Mosque of Chains, which, according to Stavroula Dadaki, was named as such for "the chains by which the main chandelier was hung from the roof".

The "mosque" is not oriented toward Mecca, which technically should make it more a medrese (secondary building in a religious complex) then a mosque, even though the building was built as a mosque.

== See also ==
- Islam in Greece
- Ottoman Greece
- List of former mosques in Greece
