= Yeni Mosque, Edessa =

Former mosque in Edessa, Greece

Yeni Mosque
- Γενί Τζαμί
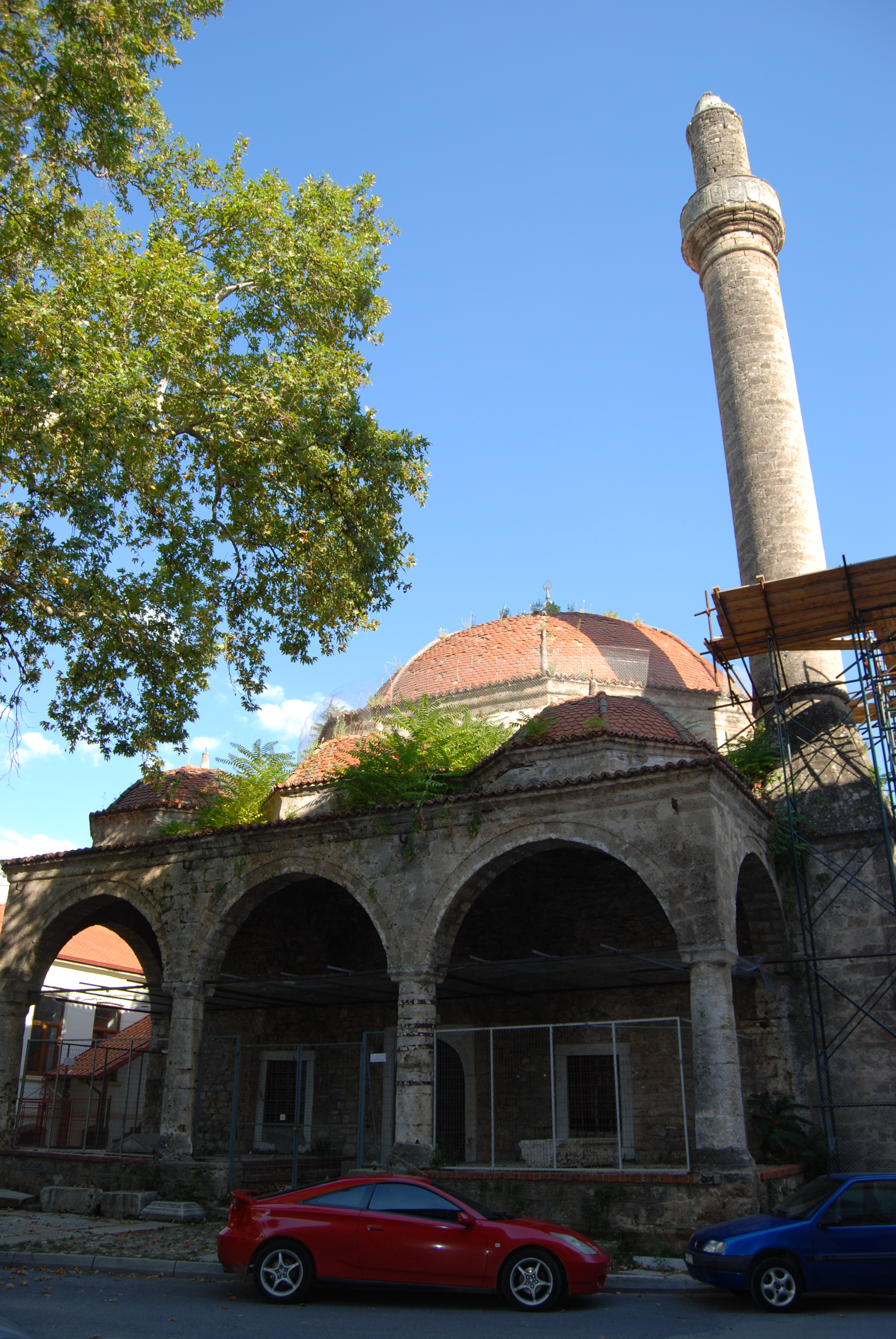
- The former mosque in Edessa

- Location of the former mosque in Greece

Religion
- Affiliation: Islam (former)
- Ecclesiastical or organizational status: Mosque (17th century–1912)
- Status: Abandoned (as a mosque); Repurposed (as a history museum)

Location
- Location: Edessa, Pella, Central Macedonia
- Country: Greece
- Interactive map of Yeni Mosque
- Coordinates: 40°47′54″N 22°02′45″E

Architecture
- Type: Mosque
- Style: Ottoman
- Completed: 17th century

Specifications
- Length: 15 m (49 ft)
- Width: 20 m (66 ft)
- Height (max): 16 m (52 ft)
- Dome: 3
- Minaret: 1
- Materials: Brick; stone

The Yeni Mosque (Greek: Γενί Τζαμί, from Turkish: Yeni Camii, lit. 'New Mosque') is a former mosque in the town of Edessa, in the Central Macedonia region of Greece. Completed in the 17th century during the Ottoman era, the mosque was abandoned in 1912 following the Balkan Wars. It is the only surviving mosque of the town, and was repurposed as a history museum in 1942.

== Overview ==
Based on the monument's morphology and its mention by Ottoman explorer and traveller Evliya Çelebi in 1668, the mosque's construction is dated from the mid-17th century. The mosque was repurposed as a museum in 1942, and it is open to visitors.

The building measures 15 by 20 metres (49 by 66 ft) and it is 16 metres (52 ft) high, with elaborate proportions. It has a square prayer hall with a hemispherical dome, which is covered with scaly tiles. An open colonnaded porch with three low domes with corresponding covering adjoins the northern face, while the tall minaret is in the northwest corner. The building sports thirty-three windows in total.

Inside the mosque, the mihrab (or praying niche) is preserved on the south wall of the building, as well as two wooden square balconies at the corners, which are accessed by stairs opening into the thickness of the wall. A long wooden portico (which no longer exists) used to ran along the northern wall, as is inferred from the corresponding access stairs that once led to it as well as to the mosque's minaret.

Inside, the painted decoration of the dome is also preserved, organized in a radial arrangement. Triangular partitions are decorated with repeating geometric shapes and floral motifs, stars with crescents and heart-shaped clams, elements belonging to the artistic vocabulary of the 19th century. Peripherally, at the base of the dome, excerpts from the Quran are imprinted.

== See also ==
- Islam in Greece
- List of former mosques in Greece
- List of museums in Greece
- Ottoman Greece
