= Halil Bey Mosque =

Former mosque in Kavala, Greece

- Τζαμί Χαλίλ Μπέη
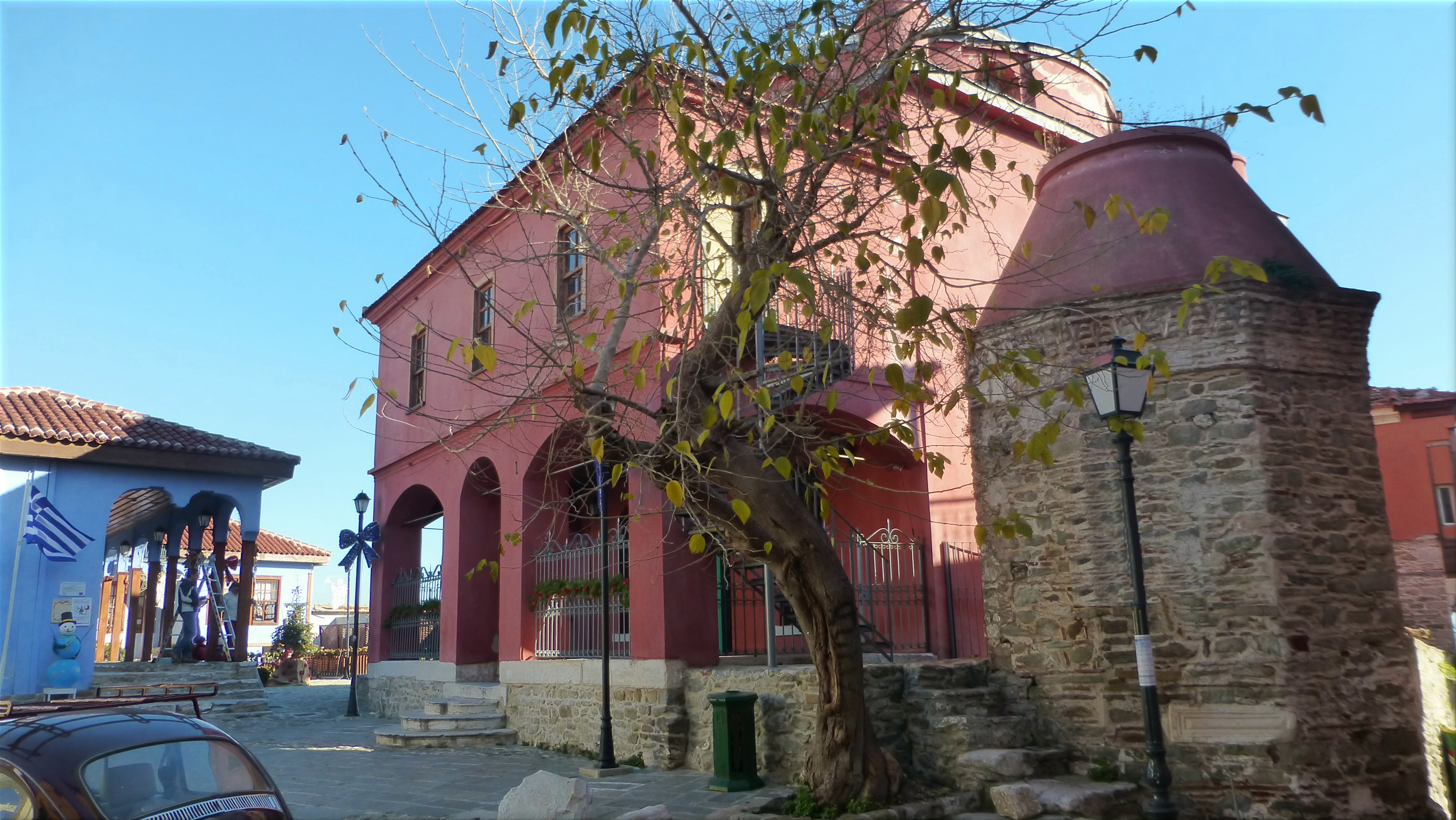

- Location of the former mosque in Greece

Religion
- Affiliation: Islam (former)
- Ecclesiastical or organizational status: Mosque (1530–1820s)
- Status: Abandoned (as a mosque); Repurposed (for cultural use)

Location
- Location: Kavala, Eastern Macedonia and Thrace
- Country: Greece
- Interactive map of Halil Bey Mosque
- Coordinates: 40°55′57.11″N 24°24′54.83″E

Architecture
- Type: Mosque
- Style: Ottoman
- Funded by: Halil Bey
- Completed: 1530s

Specifications
- Dome: 1
- Minarets: 1 (destroyed, 1950s)
- Materials: Brick; stone

The Halil Bey Mosque (Greek: Τζαμί Χαλίλ Μπέη, from Turkish: Halil Bey Camii) is a former mosque in the town of Kavala, in the Eastern Macedonia and Thrace region of Greece. Built in the 1530s during the Ottoman era, the mosque was abandoned in the 1820s and is now a museum open to visitors.

== Overview ==
The former mosque is located in the center of the small peninsula in the port, near the old fortress. It was probably built c. 1530s, around the same time as the larger Ibrahim Pasha Mosque was built. The mosque was built on top of a Byzantine church dedicated to Saint Paraskevi; the remains of the church are visible through the glass floor of the mosque. It is most likely that the first church was converted into a mosque, and then later the proper mosque building was built on that site, as was common in the areas the Ottomans conquered.

After the Balkan Wars, the mosque along with the greater Kavala region became part of the Kingdom of Greece. At the beginning of the 20th century, the mosque functioned as a girls' school. After the population exchange between Greece and Turkey, Halil Bey Mosque and its madrasa (religious school) housed many Greek refugees fleeing Turkey. In the 1930-1940 period, the mosque housed the municipality's philharmonic orchestra and was thus dubbed the "Mosque of Music". To this day, people of Kavala call it "Old Music [hall]" (Παλιά Μουσική). The mosque's minaret was torn down in the 1950s.

After a series of restoration works for both the mosque and the madrasa (but not the minaret), it was opened to the public and is a museum and a venue hall. The mosque was part of a wider complex that also included a madrasa which had eight rooms for students and which has also been preserved in good condition. It is bright red in colour.

== Gallery ==
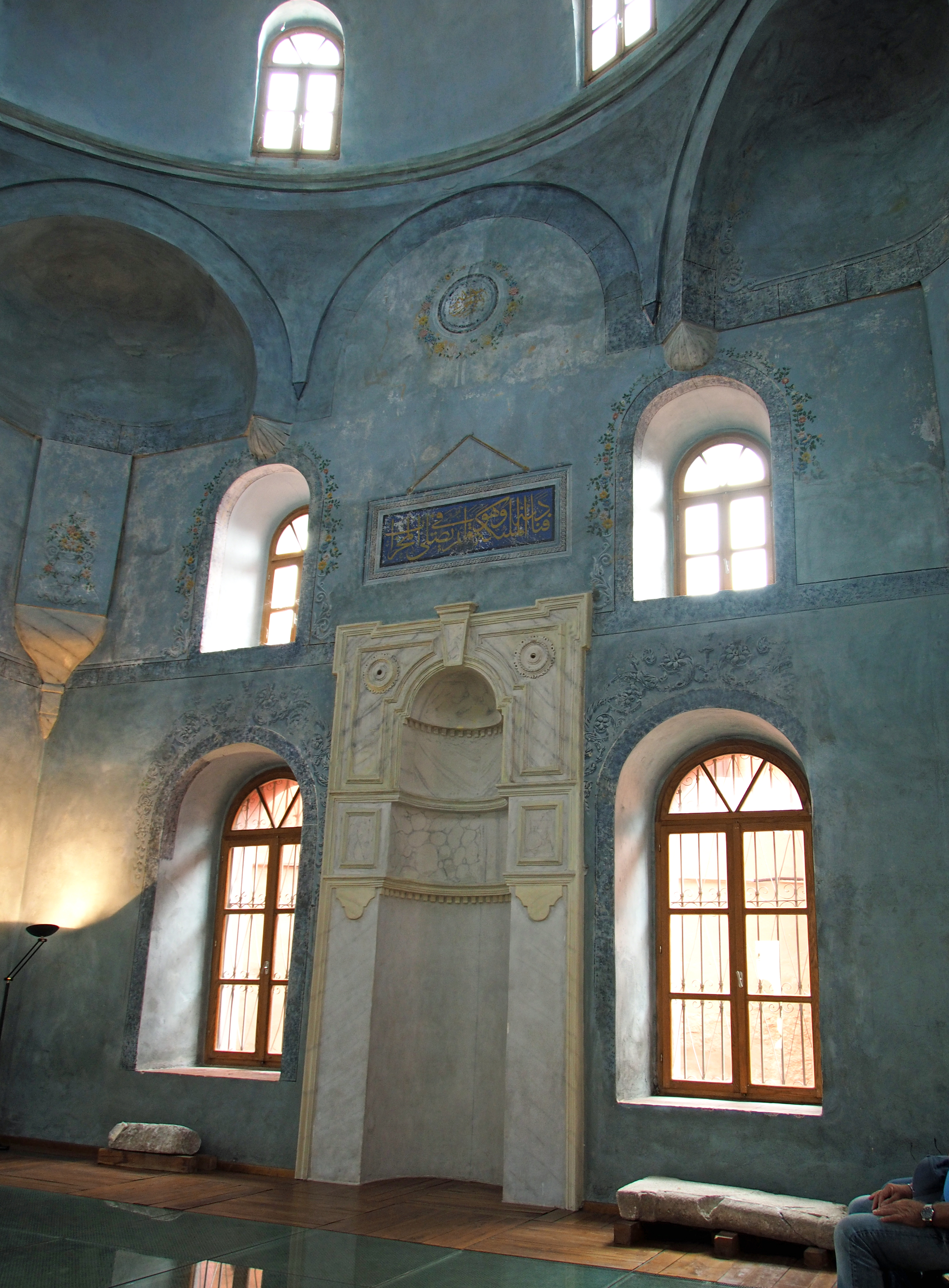
Mosque interior

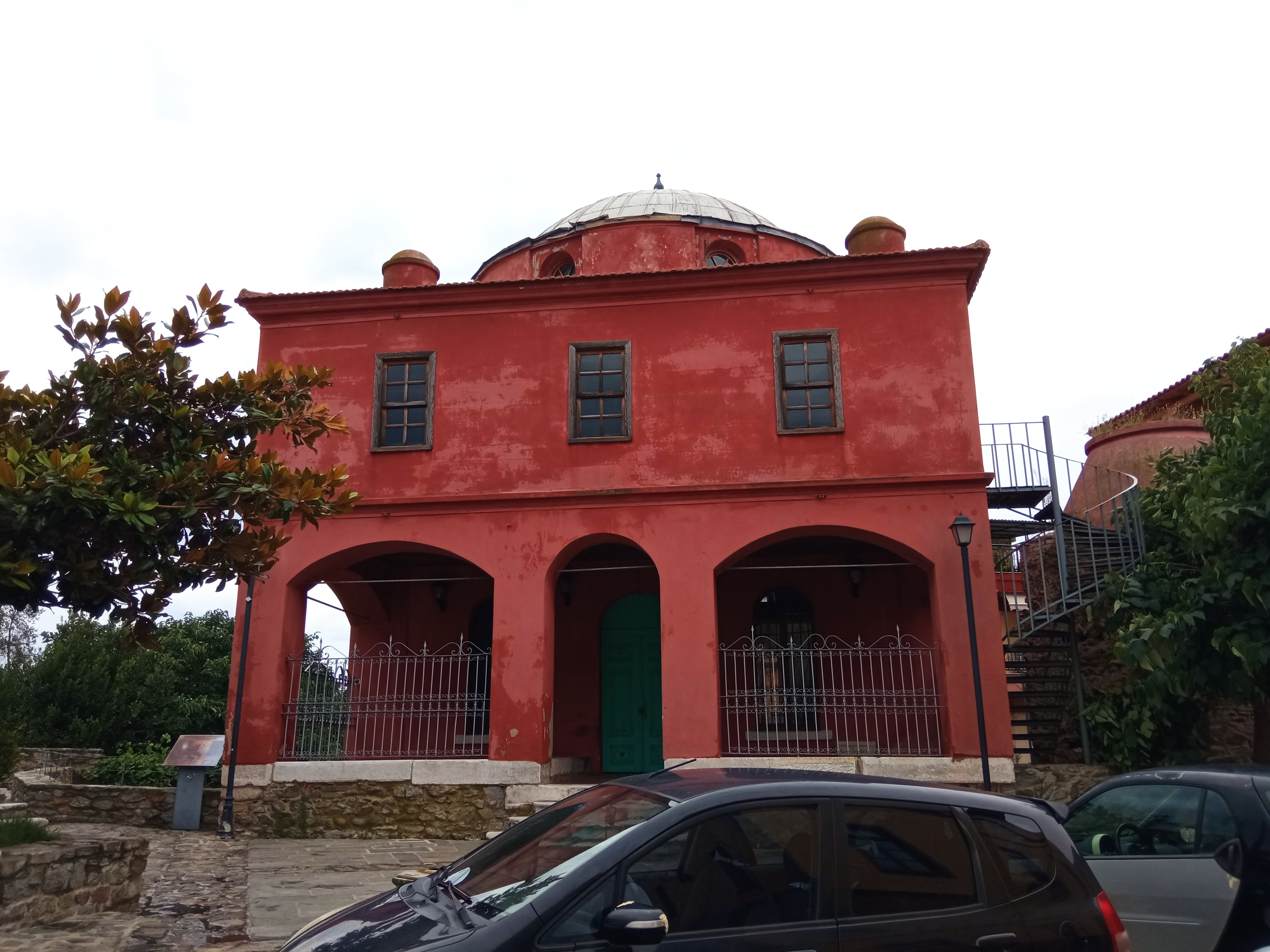
The former mosque in 2022

== See also ==
- Islam in Greece
- List of former mosques in Greece
- Ottoman Greece
