= Agha Mosque =

Ottoman former mosque in Chania, Greece

- Αγά Τζαμί
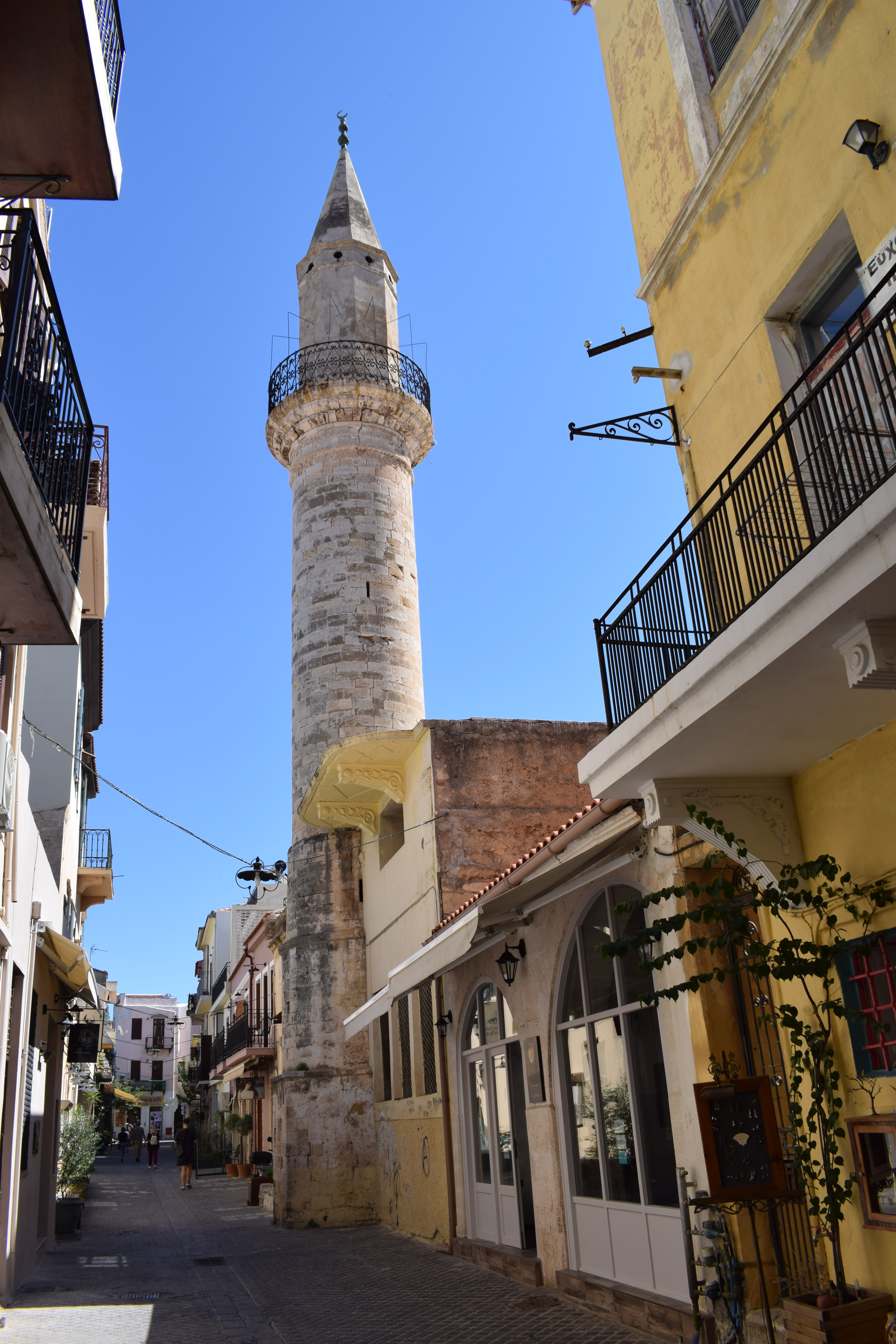
- The mosque in 2018

- Location of the former mosque in Crete

Religion
- Affiliation: Islam (former)
- Ecclesiastical or organizational status: Mosque (1645–1923)
- Status: Abandoned; repurposed

Location
- Location: Chania, Crete
- Country: Greece
- Interactive map of Agha Mosque
- Coordinates: 35°30′55.1″N 24°01′15.1″E

Architecture
- Style: Ottoman style
- Founder: Haseki Ali Agha
- Completed: 1645
- Minaret: 1

The Agha Mosque (Greek: Αγά Τζαμί), also known by a number of other names, is a former mosque in the town of Chania in Crete, southern Greece. This Ottoman mosque was built in 1645, the same year that Chania fell to the Ottoman Turks. After the exchange of populations between Greece and Turkey in the early 20th century it closed down and was repurposed as a knitting factory.

== History ==
The mosque was built very shortly after the Ottoman conquest of Chania in 1645. It is already mentioned in the chronicles of Ottoman traveller Evliya Çelebi the very same year. Its founder is recognised as Haseki Ali Agha, who was the first agha of the janisseries following the town's conquest. It is suggested that he built it by converting a catholic church dedicated to Saint George, located near the monastery of Santa Maria della Misericordia.

Following the population exchange between Greece and Turkey in 1923, the building stopped being utilised as a mosque and instead was used as a knitting mill by K. Malinakis, hence why it became known as the Malinakis Mosque as well.

== Description ==
Following the mosque's establishment, a small graveyard was established in the southern courtyard, which once contained two türbes (Muslim tombs) as evidenced from historical photographs. The mosque's minaret was erected on the western façade of the building. This minaret is unique in Crete for being the sole minaret on the island preserved entirely, as it is the only one with its crescent finial still intact. The lintel of the entrance bears an inscription with the phrase "Lâilaheillallah Muhammed resulullah", meaning There is no god but Allah and Muhammad is his Prophet.

Today the former mosque stands in the middle of Hatzi Michali Daliani and Tsouderon streets.

== See also ==
- Islam in Greece
- Ottoman Greece
- List of former mosques in Greece
- Küçük Hasan Pasha Mosque, another Chania mosque built in 1645

== Bibliography ==
- Çelebi, Evliya (2003). Seyit Ali Kahraman; Yücel Dağlı; Robert Dankoff (eds.). Evliya Çelebi Seyahatnamesi. Topkapı Sarayı Kütüphanesi Bağdat 308 Numaralı Yazmanın Transkripsiyonu - Dizini (in Turkish). Vol. 8. Yapı Kredi Yayınları.
- Gülsoy, Ersin (2004). Girit’in Fethi ve Osmanlı İdaresinin Kurulması (1645-1670) (in Turkish). Tatav. ISBN 9789756596234.
- Kolovos, Elias (2011). Τα οθωµανικά µνηµεία των Χανίων [The Ottoman Monuments of Chania] (in Greek). University of Crete.
- Manousakas, Manolis (2012). Τζαμιά, τεκέδες και τουρμπέδες στο νομό Χανίων [Mosques, tekkes and turbes in the Chania prefecture] (in Greek). Ereisma.
