= Bayrakli Mosque, Larissa =

Former mosque in Larissa, Thessaly, Greece

Bayrakli Mosque
- Μπαϊρακλί Τζαμί
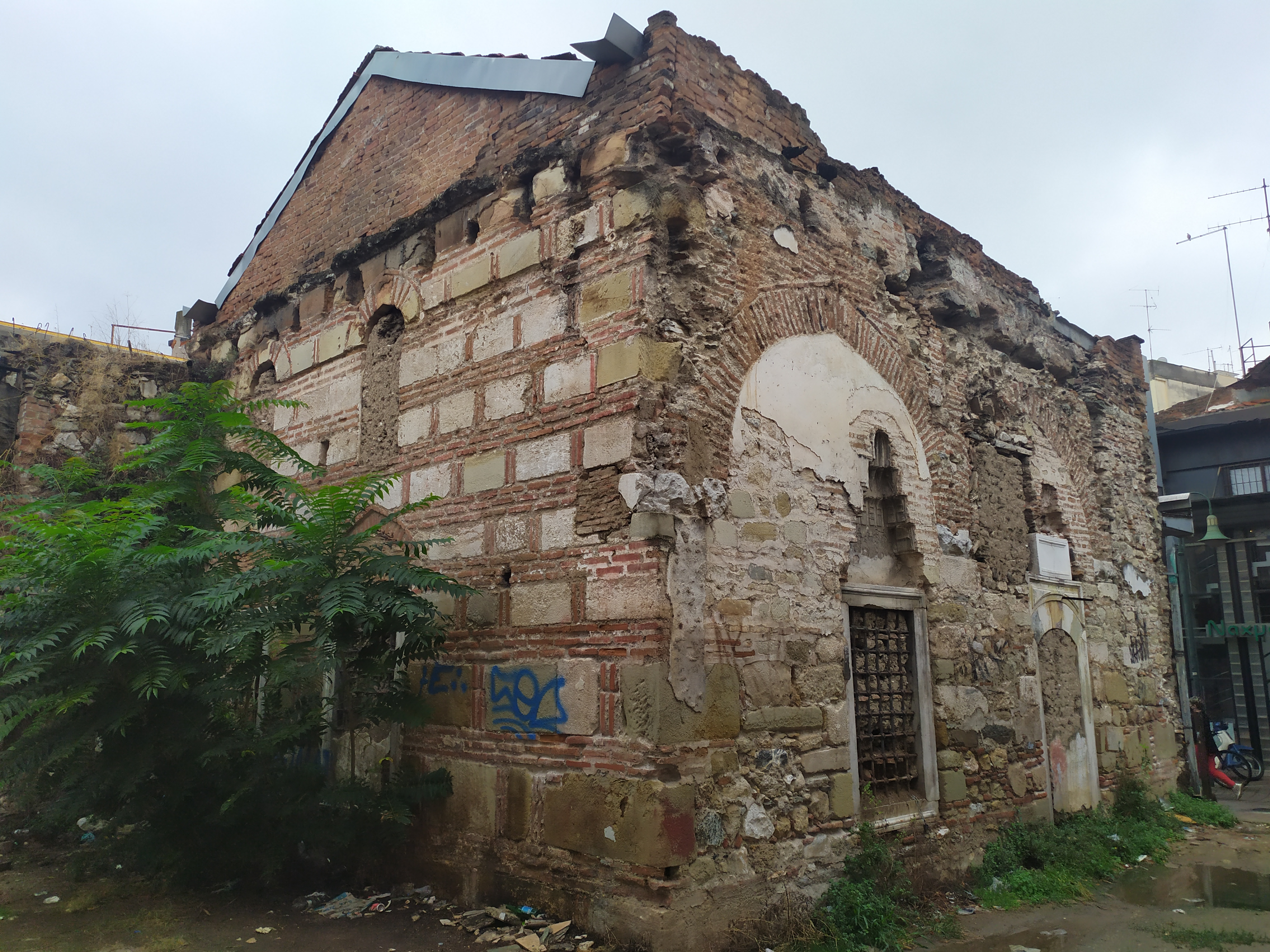
- The former mosque in Larissa

- Location of the former mosque in Greece

Religion
- Affiliation: Islam (former)
- Ecclesiastical or organizational status: Mosque
- Status: Abandoned

Location
- Location: Larissa, Thessaly
- Country: Greece
- Interactive map of Bayrakli Mosque
- Coordinates: 39°38′24″N 22°25′1″E

Architecture
- Type: Mosque
- Style: Ottoman
- Completed: 15th/16th century

The Bayrakli Mosque (Greek: Μπαϊρακλί Τζαμί, from Turkish: Bayraklı Camii, lit. 'Mosque of the Standard-bearer') is a former mosque in the city of Larissa, in the Thessaly region of Greece. The mosque was completed in the 15th-16th centuries, during the Ottoman-era.

== Description ==
The mosque is situated in the centre of the city, at the junction of Papaflessa and Ossis streets. Its masonry of brick-enclosed ashlar dates it to the 15th/16th centuries, contemporary to the bedesten market. Only two walls of the interior hall survive, incorporated in a modern structure.

The mosque reportedly derived its name from the fact that its imam used to hoist a flag (Turkish bayrak) to give the signal for the other mosques to begin the call to prayer for the faithful.

== See also ==
- Islam in Greece
- List of former mosques in Greece
- Ottoman Greece
