= Hamza Bey Mosque (Rhodes) =

Former mosque in Rhodes, Greece

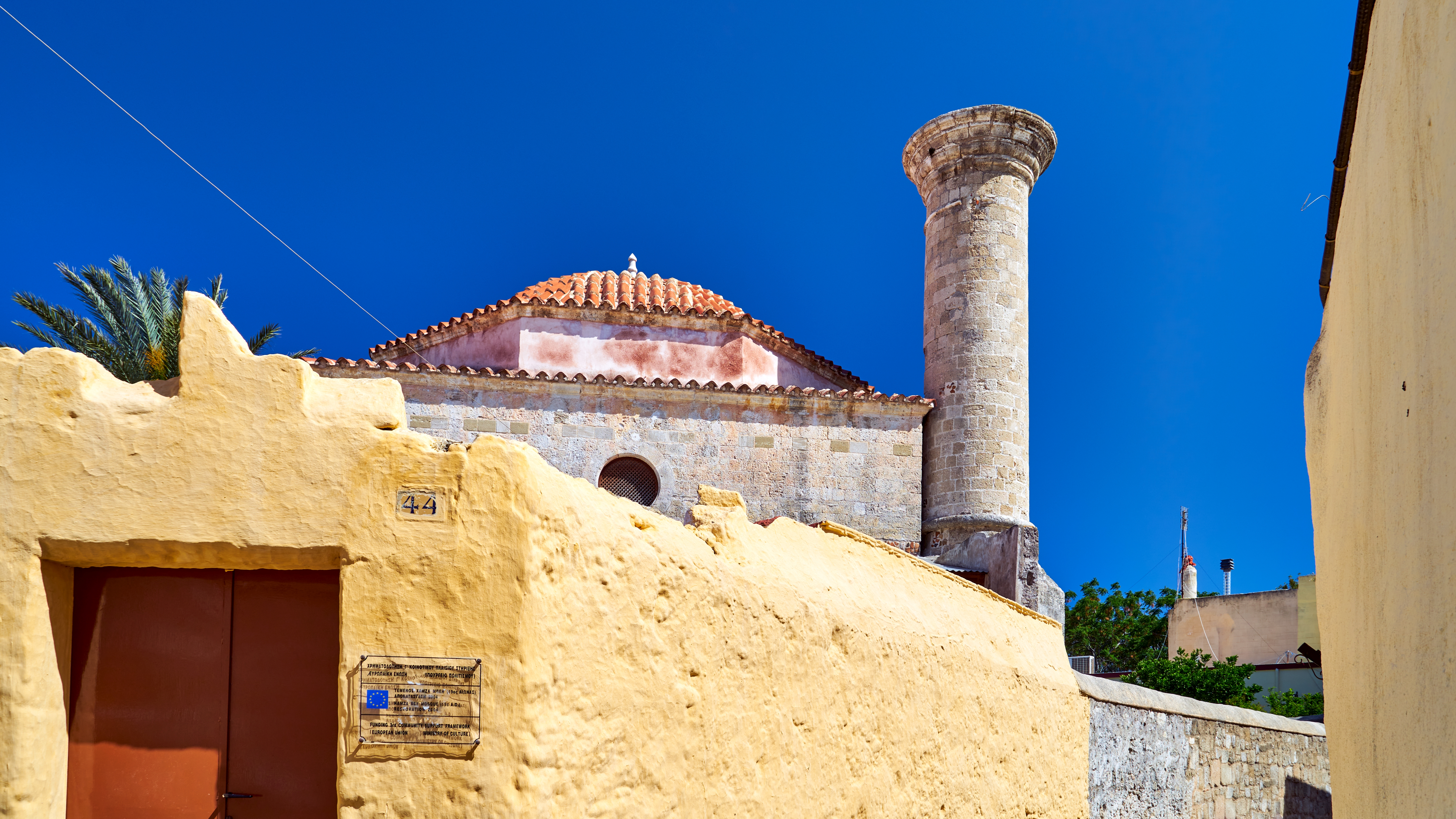
- The former mosque in Rhodes

- Location of the former mosque in Greece

Religion
- Affiliation: Sunni Islam (former)
- Ecclesiastical or organizational status: Mosque (1887–????)
- Status: Abandoned (as a mosque); Preserved

Location
- Location: Rhodes, South Aegean
- Country: Greece
- Interactive map of Hamza Bey Mosque
- Coordinates: 36°26′35″N 28°13′23″E

Architecture
- Type: Mosque
- Founder: Hamza Bey
- Completed: c. 1887

Specifications
- Dome: 1
- Minaret: 1
- Materials: Stone, brick

The Hamza Bey Mosque (Greek: Χαμζά Μπέη Τζαμί, from Turkish: Hamza Bey Camii) is a former mosque on the South Aegean island of Rhodes, in southeastern Greece. It is one of the smaller and simpler mosques on the island. Built in c. 1887, during the Ottoman era, the mosque was subsequently abandoned and is not used for worship.

== Overview ==
The mosque was most likely built in 1887, erected on the site of a previous church dedicated to the Savior. It is located within the medieval walled town of Rhodes, to the southwest of the Suleymaniye Mosque and to the east of the Mustafa Pasha Mosque.

The small mosque has a square floor plan and vaults, which is covered with a dome supported by round triangles and roofed with concave and convex tiles. Its minaret stands on the northwestern corner of the building. A central chandelier has a Mühr-ü Süleyman motif, and mihrab's center's motif depicts an oil lamp. A canopy made of wood and covered with sheet metal forms the open porch; each of the internal walls have two windows and a rectangular wardrobe in the middle, while the praying-niche stands in the middle of the eastern wall.

Renovation works on the building began in the year 2004, and focused on its minaret, particularly the inner decoration. The former mosque has been restored in full by the municipality, however is no longer used for worship.

== See also ==
- Islam in Greece
- List of former mosques in Greece
- Ottoman Greece

== Bibliography ==
- Ameen, Ahmed (2017). Islamic architecture in Greece: Mosques. Alexandria: Center for Islamic Civilization studies, Bibliotheca Alexandrina.
- Konuk, Neval (2008). Ottoman architecture in Lesvos, Rhodes, Chios and Kos islands. Ankara: The Center for Strategic Research. ISBN 978-9757307693.
- Zerlides, Michael (2008). "Hamza Bey mosque". In Ersi Brouskari (ed.). Ottoman architecture in Greece. Athens: Ministry of Culture and Sports. ISBN 9789602147931.
