= Emir Zade Mosque =

Former mosque in Chalcis, Greece

- Εμίρ Ζαδέ Τζαμί
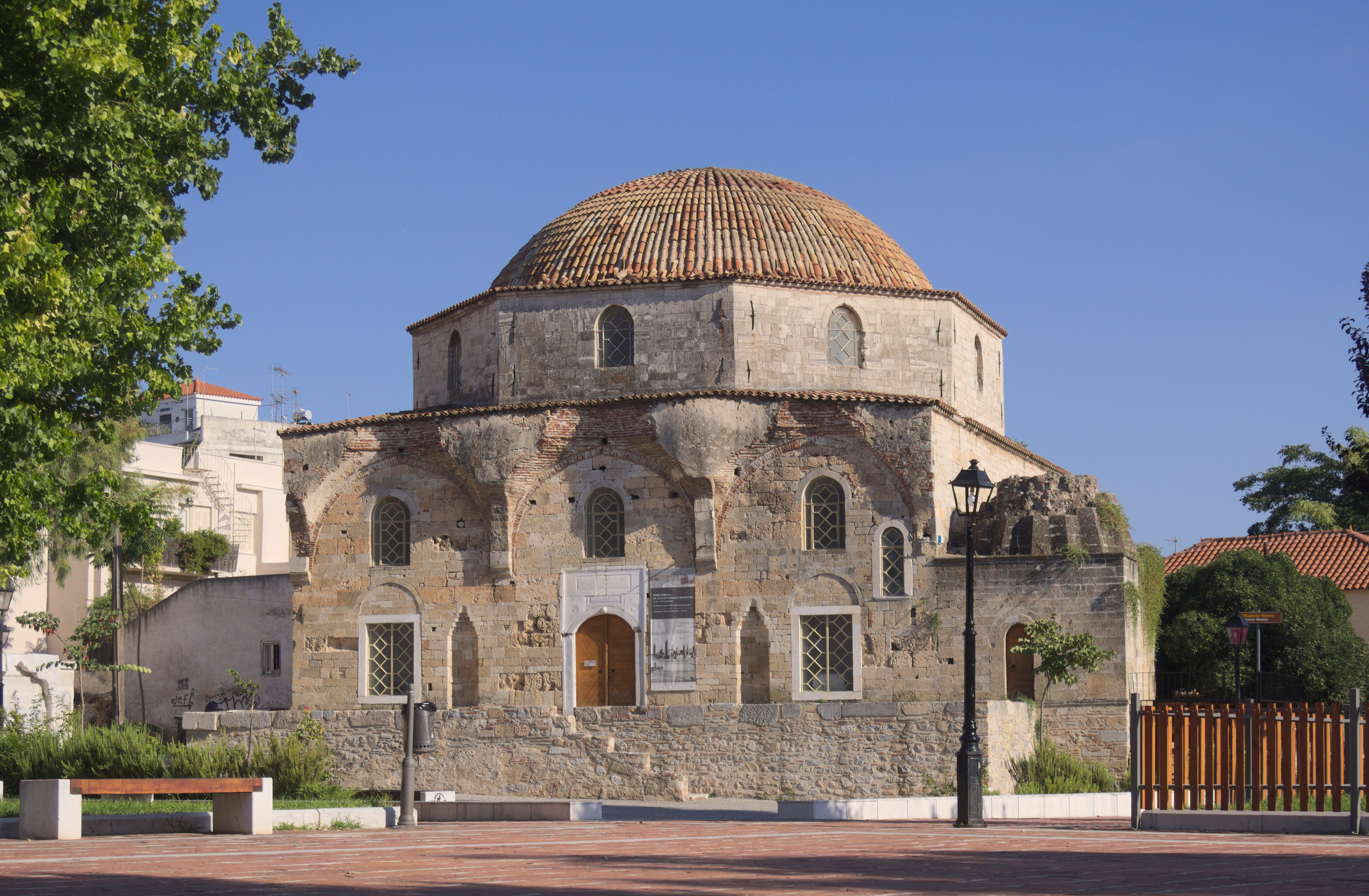

- Location of the former mosque in Greece

Religion
- Affiliation: Islam (former)
- Ecclesiastical or organizational status: Mosque (1480s–1821)
- Status: Abandoned; Non-public museum (since the 1950s)

Location
- Location: Chalcis, Euboea, Central Greece
- Country: Greece
- Interactive map of Emir Zade Mosque
- Coordinates: 38°27′41″N 23°35′28″E

Architecture
- Type: Mosque
- Style: Ottoman
- Completed: 1480s

Specifications
- Dome: 1
- Minaret: 1 (destroyed)
- Materials: Stone; bricks; marble

The Emir Zade Mosque (Greek: Εμίρ Ζαδέ Τζαμί, from Turkish: Emirzade Camii, lit. 'Mosque of the Emir's son') is a former mosque in the town of Chalcis, on the island of Euboea, Greece. The mosque was completed in the 1480s, during the Ottoman era, abandoned in 1821, and, since the 1950s, has served as a museum non-accessible to the public.

== History ==
The mosque was built shortly after the fall of Euboea to the Ottomans in the 15th century, and it was one of the three mosques within the walled city. Evliya Çelebi, an Ottoman explorer and traveller, who visited Chalcis in the 17th century, noted eleven mosques including the Emir Zade Mosque.

Based on an 1843 watercolor by Andre Couchaud, the minaret and portico survived intact until around the mid-19th century.

Following the Greek War of Independence in 1821 and the liberation of Chalcis from the Ottoman Turks, it was converted into a barracks. In 1937 it was declared a historical monument, and today it houses part of the medieval archaeological collection of Chalcis, however the museum is not open to the public. Since the late 1950s the building has been gradually restored while in the period 1970 to 1973 period it underwent restoration work.

== Architecture ==
Outside the Ottoman mosque there are remains of an earlier Christian church which was converted into a mosque. The Emir Zade Mosque is of a simple architectural style of single-dome mosque, like most in Greece and the rest of the Balkans.

Aside from the lost portico and minaret, the mosque survives almost intact. It consists of a rectangular room covered by a dome which is hemispherical inside and octagonal outside, resting on four semi-conical domes. On the west side there by columns gallery, the revak, roofed with hemispherical calotte. The cylindrical minaret used to stand on the southwest side; only the square base is left.

The marble slabs of the entrance frame have inscriptions in Arabic, which read “enter here in peace and will be immortal in the name of all-merciful God.” The interior of the mosque is illuminated by two parallel rows of windows. Inside, the niche of the mihrab was placed in the east wall, where traces of colour and the original décor still remain. Two more marble plaques inscribed with excerpts from the Quran in Arabic crown the arch. Preserved is also the fountain in the yard, bearing inscriptions and decorated with elaborately embossed Arabic art, built in 1655. Scattered around the mosque are several fragments of ancient columns and capitals.

Civil engineer, Giannis Karalis, made the following observation:

"The Emir Zade mosque–like several of those preserved in Greece–is of particular interest due to its relationship with Byzantine architecture, by which it was clearly influenced, as well as its integration into the medieval Greek settlements. The study, however, has not yet progressed."

— Giannis Karalis

== Gallery ==
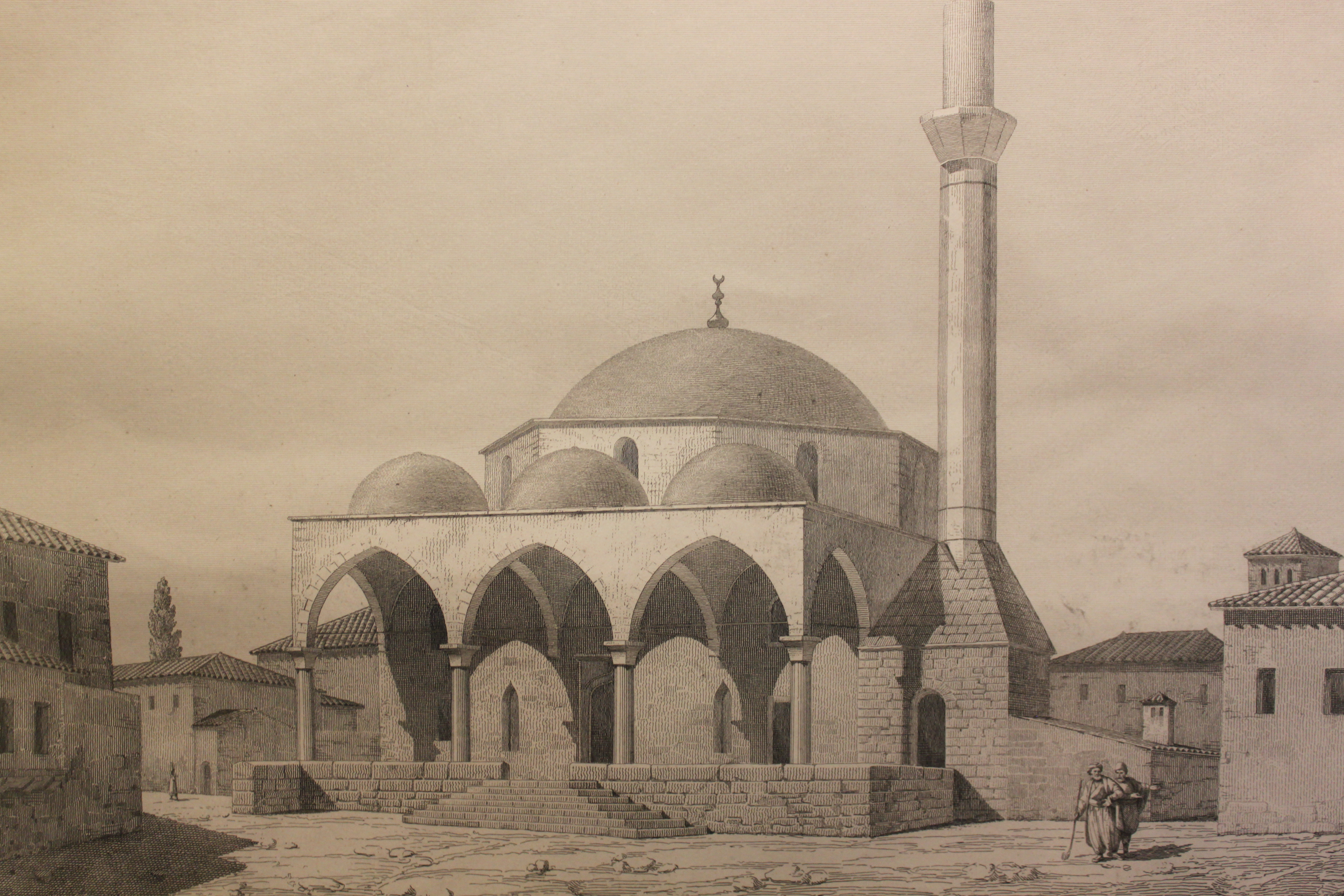
Gravure by Antoine-Marie Chenavard in 1858

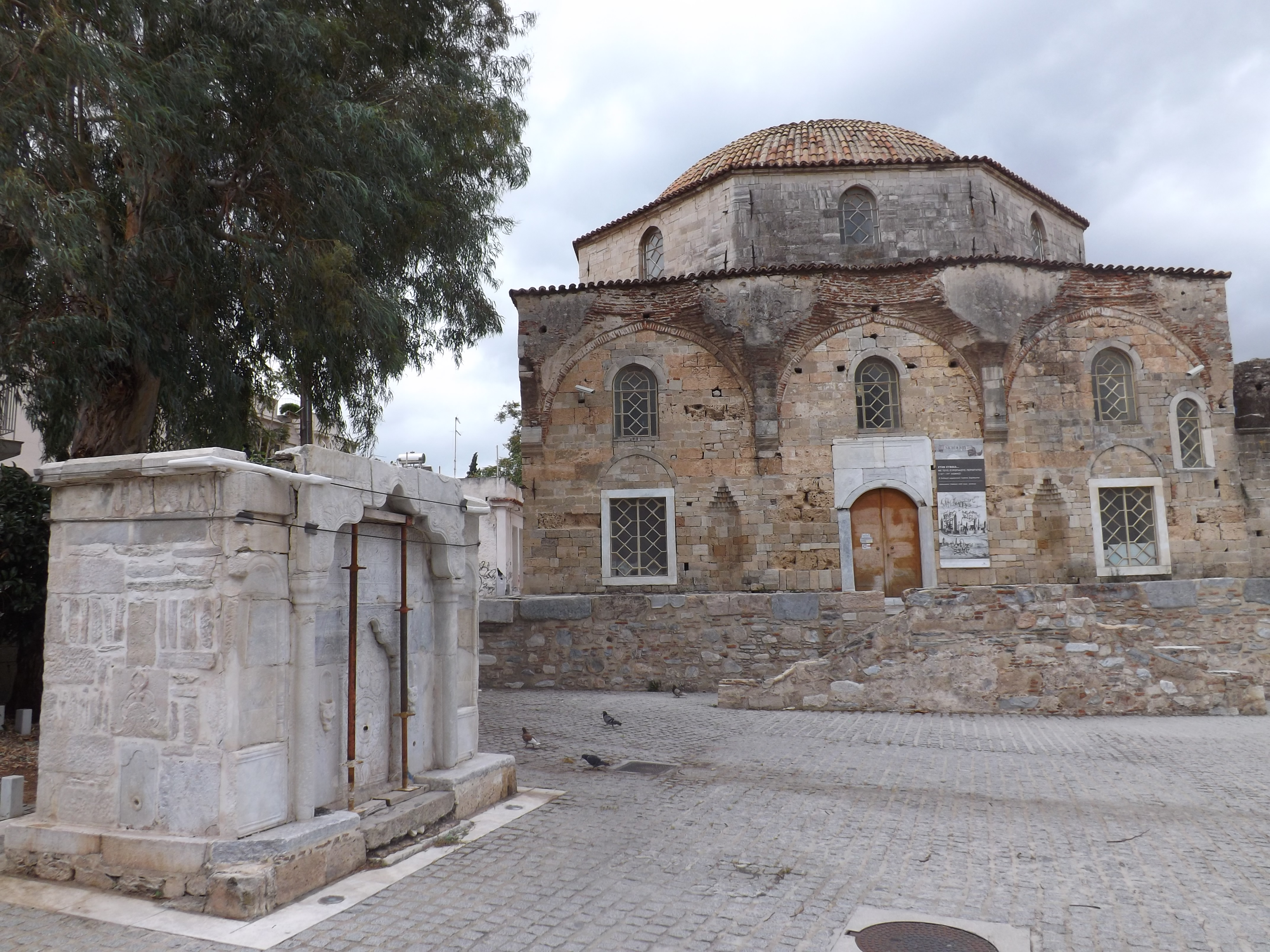
View of the fountain and the mosque from the north

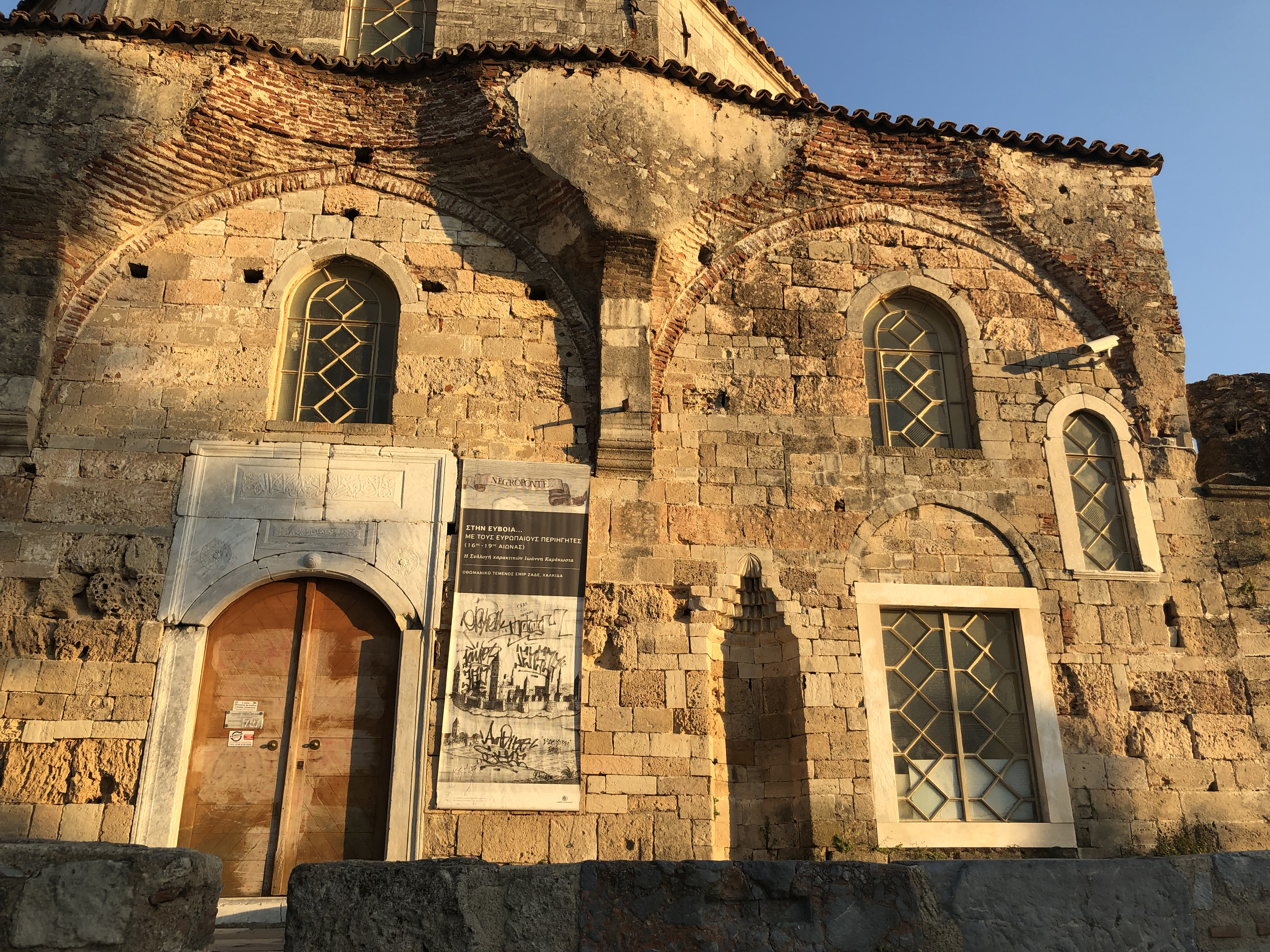
The main façade principale

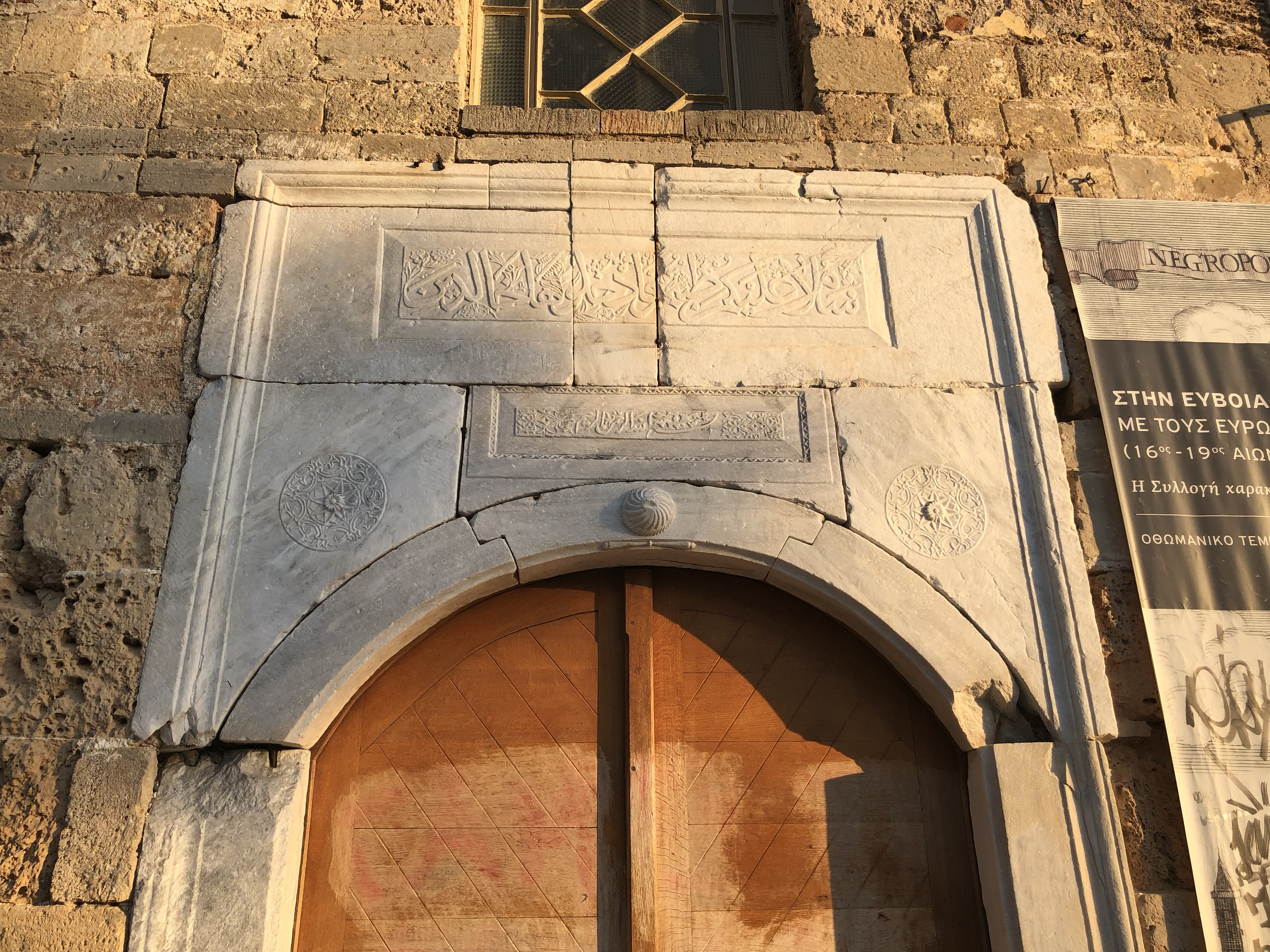
Detail of the dedicatory inscription

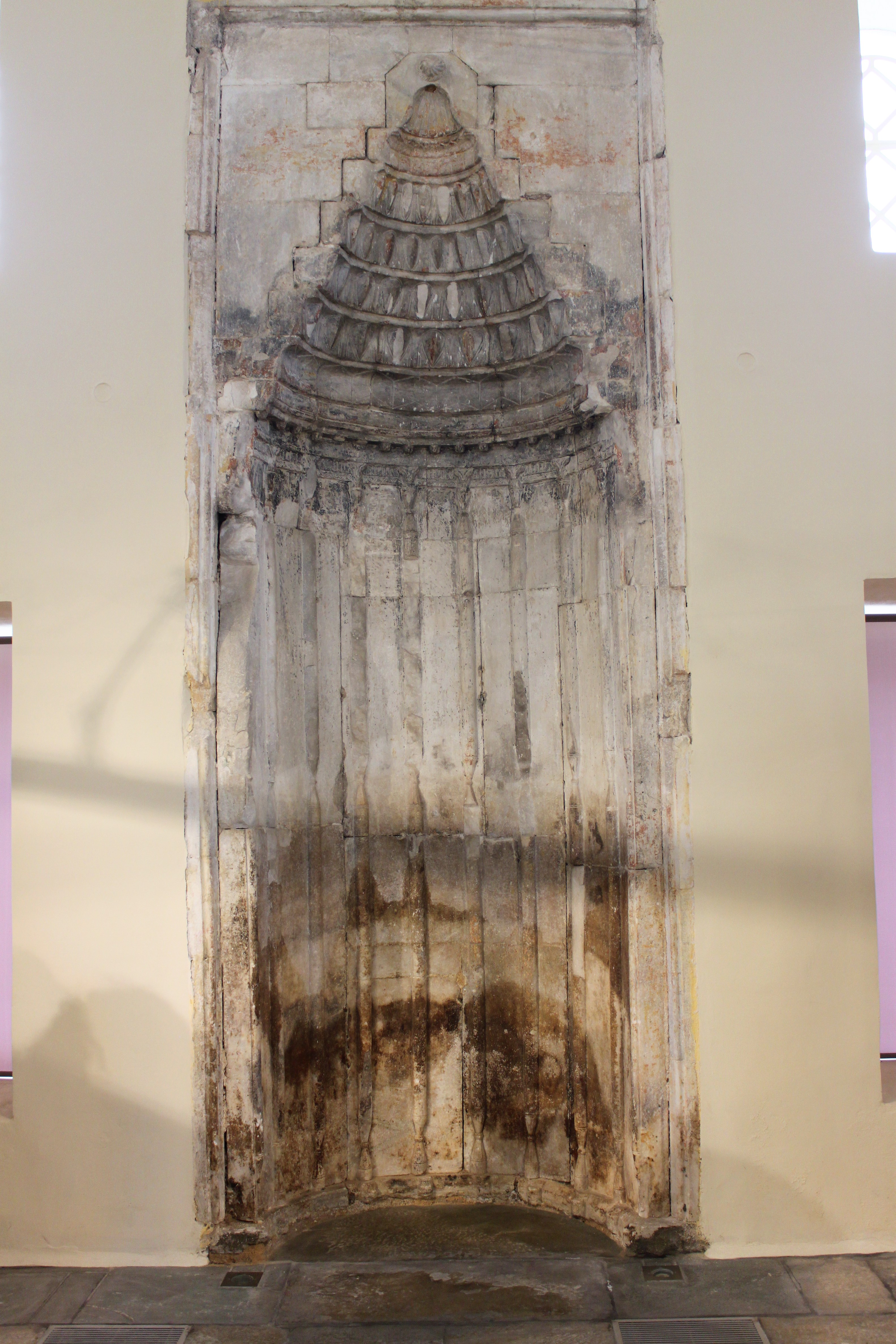
View of the mihrab

== See also ==
- Islam in Greece
- List of former mosques in Greece
- Ottoman Greece
