= Arap Mosque (Drama) =

Former mosque in Drama, Greece

- Αράπ Τζαμί
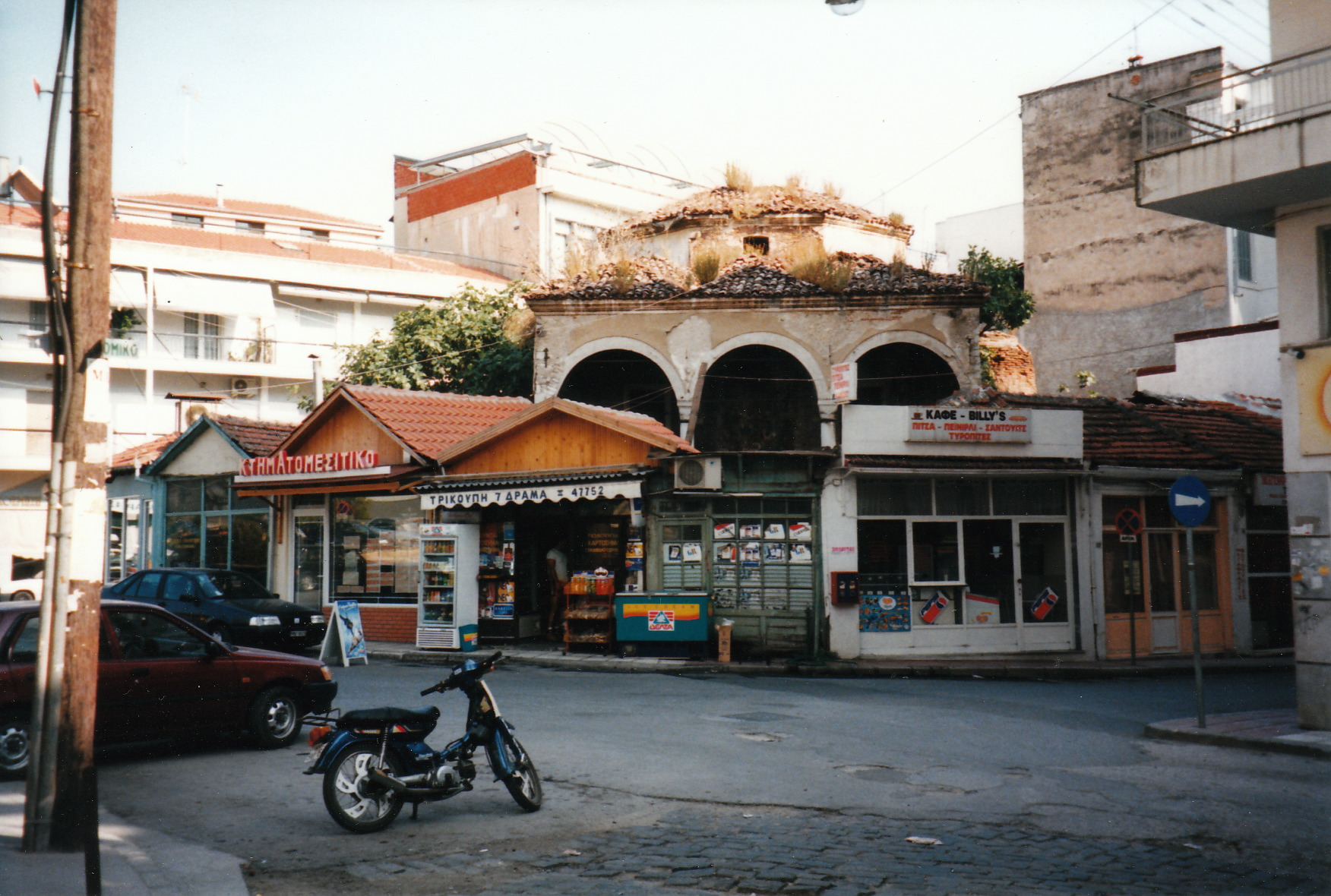
- Arap Mosque in 1998

- Location of the former mosque in Greece

Religion
- Affiliation: Islam (former)
- Ecclesiastical or organizational status: Mosque (1875–1922)
- Status: Closed

Location
- Location: Drama, Eastern Macedonia and Thrace
- Country: Greece
- Interactive map of Arap Mosque
- Coordinates: 41°09′08″N 24°08′48″E

Architecture
- Type: Mosque
- Completed: 1850-1875

Specifications
- Dome: 1
- Materials: Stone; brick

The Arap Mosque (Greek: Αράπ Τζαμί, from Turkish: Arap Camii, lit. 'Arab Mosque') also known as the Mosque of the Law Courts (Greek: Τζαμί Δικαστηρίων) is a mosque in the town of Drama, Eastern Macedonia, in Greece. Completed in the 1870s, during the Ottoman-era, the mosque was neglected for almost a century. As of November 2022, restorations commenced.

== History ==
The Arap Mosque was probably built by the governor of Drama, Hivzi Pasha, around 1850-1875, on the site of an older mosque, dating from around the 15th or 16th century. Characteristic is the change of use of the building from time to time. Since 2001, the building has belonged to the Municipality of Drama, and has been used as an exhibition venue. Following the Balkan Wars of 1912–13, Drama became part of modern Greece. As happened with other mosques, Arap Mosque was sold to private individuals in 1922. For some years it functioned as a dance school. During the period of Bulgarian rule during World War II, the mosque was broken into and looted. After Drama returned to Greek hands, the mosque housed the city's conservatory. In the years that followed, the historic building was transferred to various owners, the last being the civil engineer Christos Kalogirou.

It is commonly said in Drama that Arap Mosque remained for a century in ruins and disarray. Important milestones in its recent history is 1977, when it was classified as a historical preserved monument due to its architectural uniqueness, and 2001, when it came under the jurisdiction of the municipality of Drama. Until then, the mosque had been drowned in other ground-floor buildings around its perimeter, mainly shops, which were built later, completely hiding the old mosque which ceased to even have access from the street. This made it impossible not only to maintain but also to clean it. In 2021 restoration works began, with the aim of even finally creating access to the surrounded mosque.

== Structure ==
It is a single-chamber dome mosque with a tripartite portico, and has dimensions of 12.9 by 9.2 metres (42 by 30 ft) for the main building and 3.2 by 9.2 metres (10 by 30 ft) for the portico. The main building includes the entrance area with the atrium and the square prayer area. A two-story marble pew forms the boundary between the entrance area and the prayer area. In the center of the south-eastern masonry the mihrab can be found. The housing of the space is carried out with a dome that rests on the external masonry and the pew.

In the interior, on the façade and the portico, painted decoration is preserved which was carried out in two time periods, the first with its construction and the second possibly with the change of use of the building after 1913. The painting style that dominates today the Arap Mosque is the original one, since due to wear and tear the newer decoration is found only in a limited area. The mosque also has marble, metal and ceramic elements which are also to be preserved.

== See also ==
- Islam in Greece
- Ottoman Greece
- List of former mosques in Greece
