= Selvili Mosque, Komotini =

Former mosque in Komotini, Greece

Selvili Mosque
- Σελβιλί Τζαμί
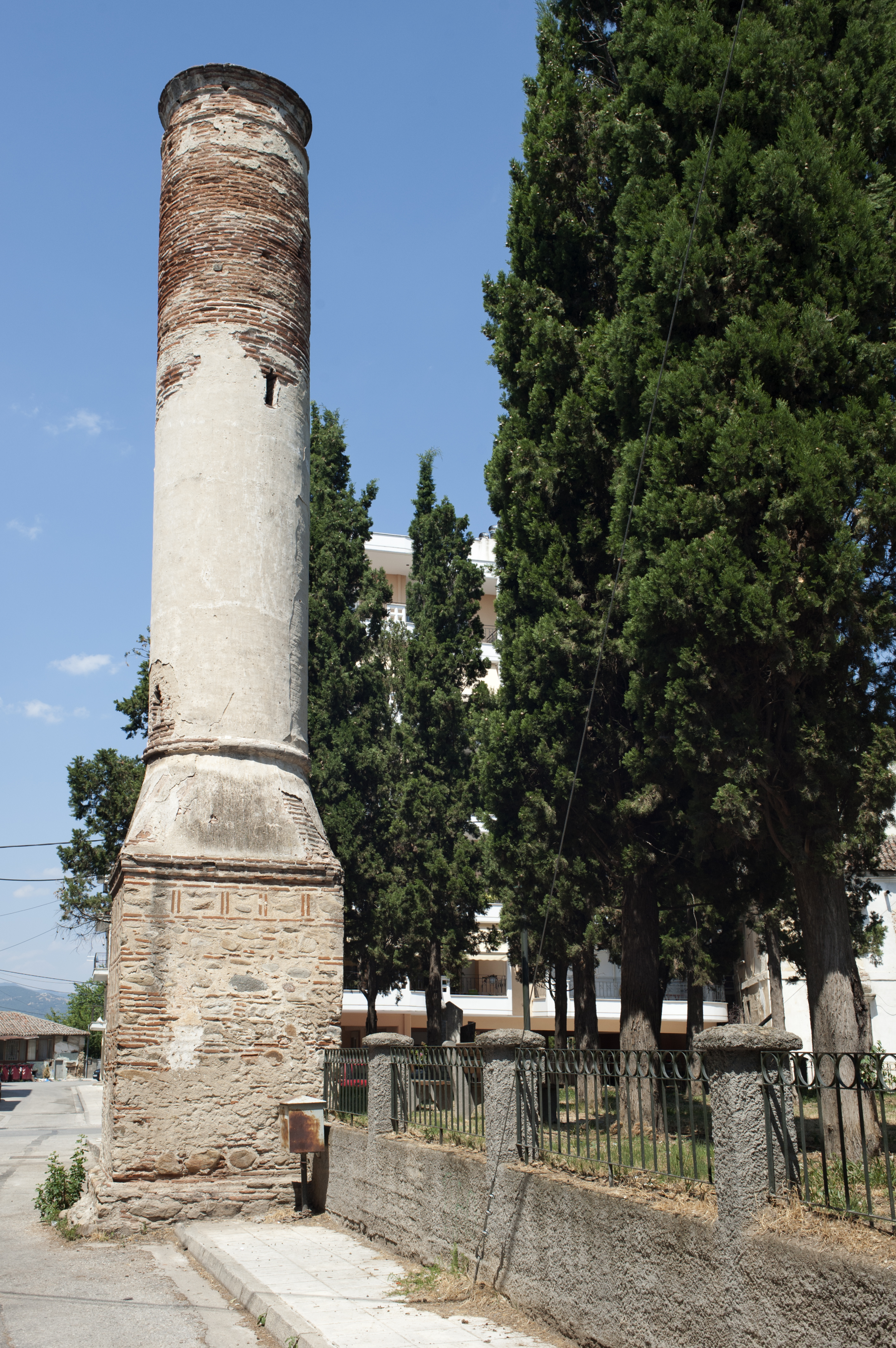
- The minaret remains of the demolished mosque

- Location of the former mosque in Greece

Religion
- Affiliation: Islam (former)
- Ecclesiastical or organizational status: Mosque ( –c. 1910s)
- Status: Abandoned (as a mosque); Demolished (partial ruins)

Location
- Location: Komotini, Western Thrace
- Country: Greece
- Interactive map of Selvili Mosque
- Coordinates: 41°7′18″N 25°23′58″E

Architecture
- Type: Mosque
- Style: Ottoman
- Demolished: 1940

Specifications
- Minaret: 1
- Site area: 472 m^{2} (5,080 sq ft)

The Selvili Mosque (Greek: Σελβιλί Τζαμί, from Turkish: Selvili Camii), also locally known as the Broken Mosque (Greek: Σπασμένο Τζαμί), is a former mosque in the town of Komotini, in the Western Thrace region of Greece. The mosque was completed during the Ottoman era, was subsequently abandoned, and later demolished. Only its former minaret and an adjacent grave survives.

== Description ==
The period when the mosque was completed in not known, other than to occur during the Ottoman era, no earlier than the 14th century. The mosque was abandoned in the c. 1910s, following the First Balkan War and the structure fell into a state of disrepair. The former mosque was demolished in 1940 due to its dilapidated state.

The only thing left of the mosque is a half-destroyed minaret and an Ottoman-era grave, dating from 1761 and belonging to Kayserili Suleyman Effendi.

On 7 January 2019, the Management Committee of the Muslim Property of Komotini registered the former mosque's 472-square-metre (5,080 sq ft) plot at the Cadastral Office of Komotini.

== See also ==
- Islam in Greece
- List of former mosques in Greece
- Ottoman Greece
