= Mahmud Çelebi Mosque =

Former mosque in Veroia, Central Macedonia, Greece

- Τζαμί του Μαχμούτ Τσελεμπή
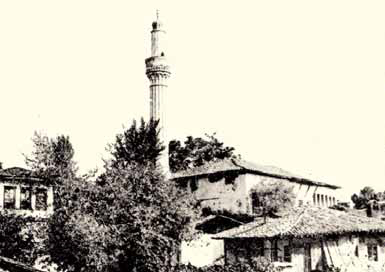
- The mosque in 1900

- Location of the former mosque in Greece

Religion
- Affiliation: Islam (former)
- Ecclesiastical or organisational status: Mosque (16th century–1912)
- Status: Abandoned (as a mosque); Partial ruins

Location
- Location: Veroia, Central Macedonia
- Country: Greece
- Interactive map of Mahmud Çelebi Mosque
- Coordinates: 40°31′11″N 22°12′13″E

Architecture
- Type: Mosque
- Style: Ottoman
- Completed: 16th century

Specifications
- Dome: 1
- Minarets: 1 (collapsed, 1940)
- Materials: Brick; stone

The Mahmud Çelebi Mosque (Greek: Τζαμί του Μαχμούτ Τσελεμπή), also known as the Boyali Mosque (Μπογιαλί Τζαμί), is a former mosque, now in partial ruins, located in the northern city of Veria, in the Central Macedonia region of Greece. The mosque was built in the 16th century, during the Ottoman era, and was subsequently abandoned, most likely in 1912, during the Balkan Wars.

== History ==
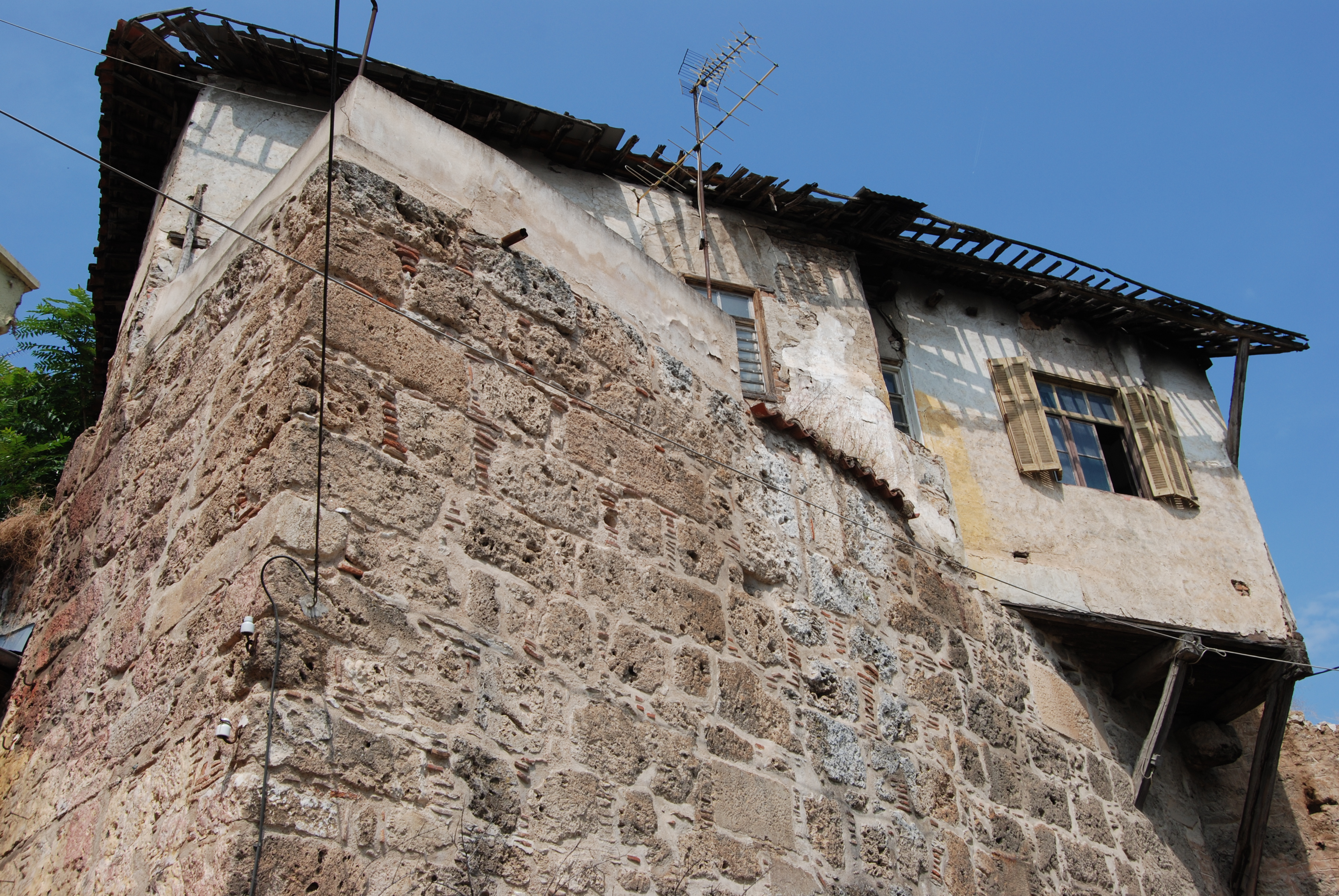
The mosque in 2016

The mosque was built on the southern city wall of old Veria, and lies next to the city's Byzantine Museum. One of the city's five dervish lodges was situated to its south in Ottoman times, probably the one known as Baba Tekke.

Its second name, "Boyali Mosque", means "Painted Mosque" and refers to the bright colours with which its exterior was originally decorated. Only traces of them survive today, and the building looks externally indistinguishable from a private residence with its tiled roof, a role which it played for a while in the 20th century. Its most striking feature was its minaret, which resembled a Doric order column in its fluted shape. The minaret collapsed in 1940, and only the base survives today.
