= Valide Mosque =

Valide Mosque or Valide Sultan Mosque (Turkish: Valide [Sultan] Camii, lit. 'Mosque of the Valide Sultan') can refer to:

- Atik Valide Mosque, in Istanbul, Turkey
- New Valide Sultan Mosque, in Istanbul, Turkey
- Pertevniyal Valide Sultan Mosque, in Istanbul, Turkey
- Yeni Valide Mosque, in the Üsküdar district of Istanbul, Turkey
- Valide Mosque, in Mytilene, Greece
- Valide Sultan Mosque in Rethymno, Greece
