= Valide Sultan Mosque, Rethymno =

Former mosque in Crete, Greece

Valide Sultan Mosque
- Τζαμί Βαλιδέ Σουλτάνας
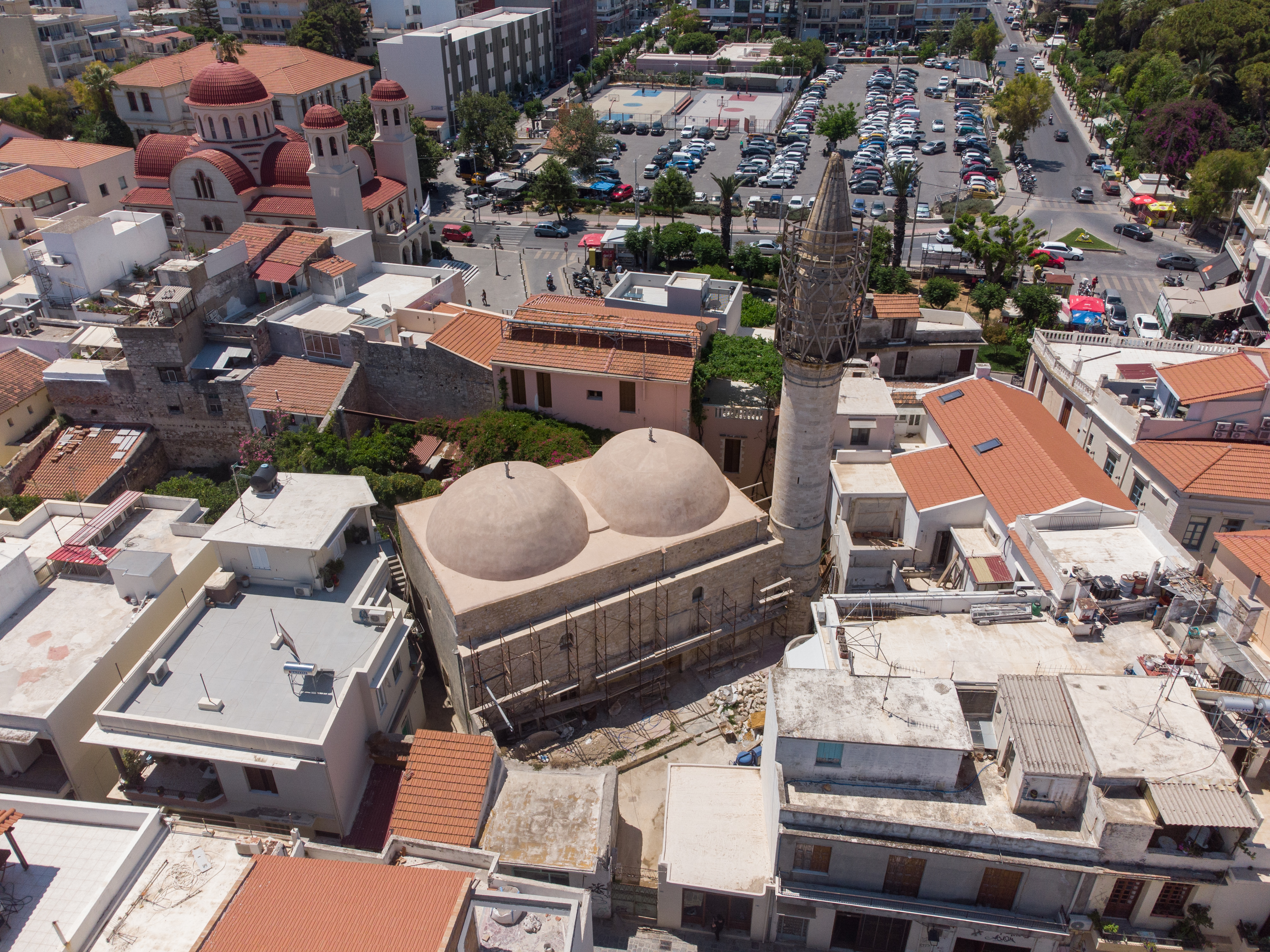
- Aerial view of the former mosque

- Location of the former mosque in Crete

Religion
- Affiliation: Sunni Islam (former)
- Ecclesiastical or organizational status: Mosque (1650s–1923)
- Status: Abandoned (as a mosque)

Location
- Location: Rethymno, Crete
- Country: Greece
- Interactive map of Valide Sultan Mosque
- Coordinates: 35°22′21″N 24°28′16″E

Architecture
- Type: Mosque
- Style: Ottoman
- Founder: Turhan Sultan
- Completed: 1650s

Specifications
- Dome: 2
- Minaret: 1
- Materials: Stone; brick

The Valide Sultan Mosque (Greek: Τζαμί Βαλιδέ Σουλτάνας, from Turkish: Valide Sultan Camii, meaning "Mosque of the Sultana Mother") is a former mosque, located in the town of Rethymno, on the island of Crete, in southern Greece. The mosque was built in the c. 1650s, during the Ottoman era, shortly after the town was conquered by the Ottomans in the seventeen century. The mosque was dedicated to Turhan Sultan, the mother of Sultan Mehmed IV, after whom it was also named in honour. As with most Ottoman-era mosques in Greece, it is no longer open for worship. It is not accessible to the public due to numerous structures that have since been built around it.

== History ==
The oldest historical reference to the mosque can be dated back to 1654, just a few years after the Ottoman conquest of the town; a document from 1671 mentions its dependence on the Valide Sultan Mosque in Bahçe Kapısı, in Constantinople (now Istanbul). It was named for Turhan Hadice, the sultan's mother, who also founded a school in Rethymno, which now houses the first elementary school of Rethymno. Locally it was known as the "Great Gate Mosque", as it was built in the 'Great Gate' district of the town. The mosque served the Muslim population of Rethymno for centuries until the exchange of Muslim and Christian populations between Greece and Turkey in 1923, thereupon it was abandoned by 1925.

== Architecture ==
The former mosque, which today is surrounded by the buildings of the modern urban environment, consists of two domes, while the prayer niche (mihrab) is flanked by columns which use two Corinthian capitals turned upside-down as pedestals. The semi-circular arch of the mihrab is surrounded by a relief of an arbor and an inscription quoting a verse from the Qur'an (specifically Al-Imran, 37). Right above the entrance an inscription dated from 1816 refers to a renovation by Hilmi Ibrahim Pasha.

Its minaret was rebuilt by 1878 as evidenced by a plaque placed on the former mosque, naming its benefactor as Mehmet Agha Bolanakis, a local Rethymniote. The minaret is built with isomorphic stones, it has a cylindrical exterior, while its tip is pyramid-like in shape.

The former mosque's fountain, previously in the sahn, is today located inside a shop on Bosporus street. It has nine small columns with relief motifs of a crescent moon and a six-pointed star.

== See also ==
- Islam in Greece
- List of former mosques in Greece
- Ottoman Crete
