= Ibrahim Han Mosque =

Former mosque in Rethymno, Greece

- Τζαμί του Ιμπραήμ Χαν
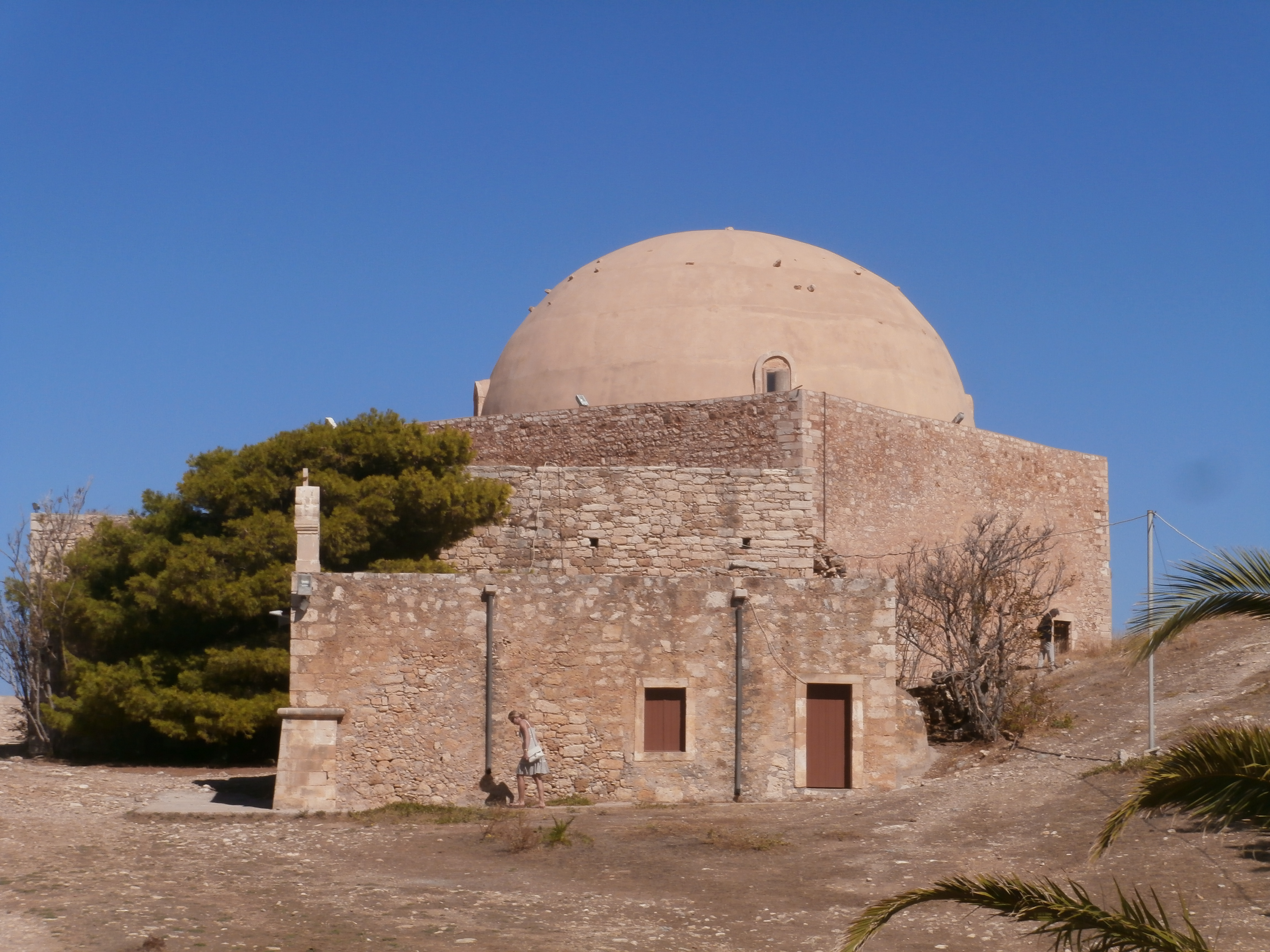
- The former mosque in the fortezza

- Location of the former mosque in Greece

Religion
- Affiliation: Sunni Islam (former)
- Ecclesiastical or organizational status: Church (1580s–1648); Mosque (1648–1971)
- Status: Abandoned (as a mosque); Repurposed (as an exhibition center)

Location
- Location: Rethymno, Crete
- Country: Greece
- Interactive map of Ibrahim Han Mosque
- Coordinates: 35°22′21″N 24°28′16″E

Architecture
- Type: Mosque
- Style: Ottoman
- Completed: 1583-1585 (as a church); 1648 (as a mosque)

Specifications
- Dome: 1
- Dome dia. (outer): 11 m (36 ft)
- Minaret: 1 (collapsed)
- Materials: Stone; brick

The Ibrahim Han Mosque (Greek: Τζαμί του Ιμπραήμ Χαν, from Turkish: İbrahim Han Camii), also known as the Sultan Ibrahim Mosque (Greek: Τζαμί του Σουλτάνου Ιμπραήμ), is a former mosque in the town of Rethymno, on the island of Crete, in southern Greece. Situated inside the old fortezza of Rethymno, the structure was originally built in the c. 1580s by the Venetians as a church. The church was converted to a mosque following the island's conquest at the hands of the Ottomans. The mosque was abandoned in 1971, and subsequently repurposed as an exhibition center.

== History ==
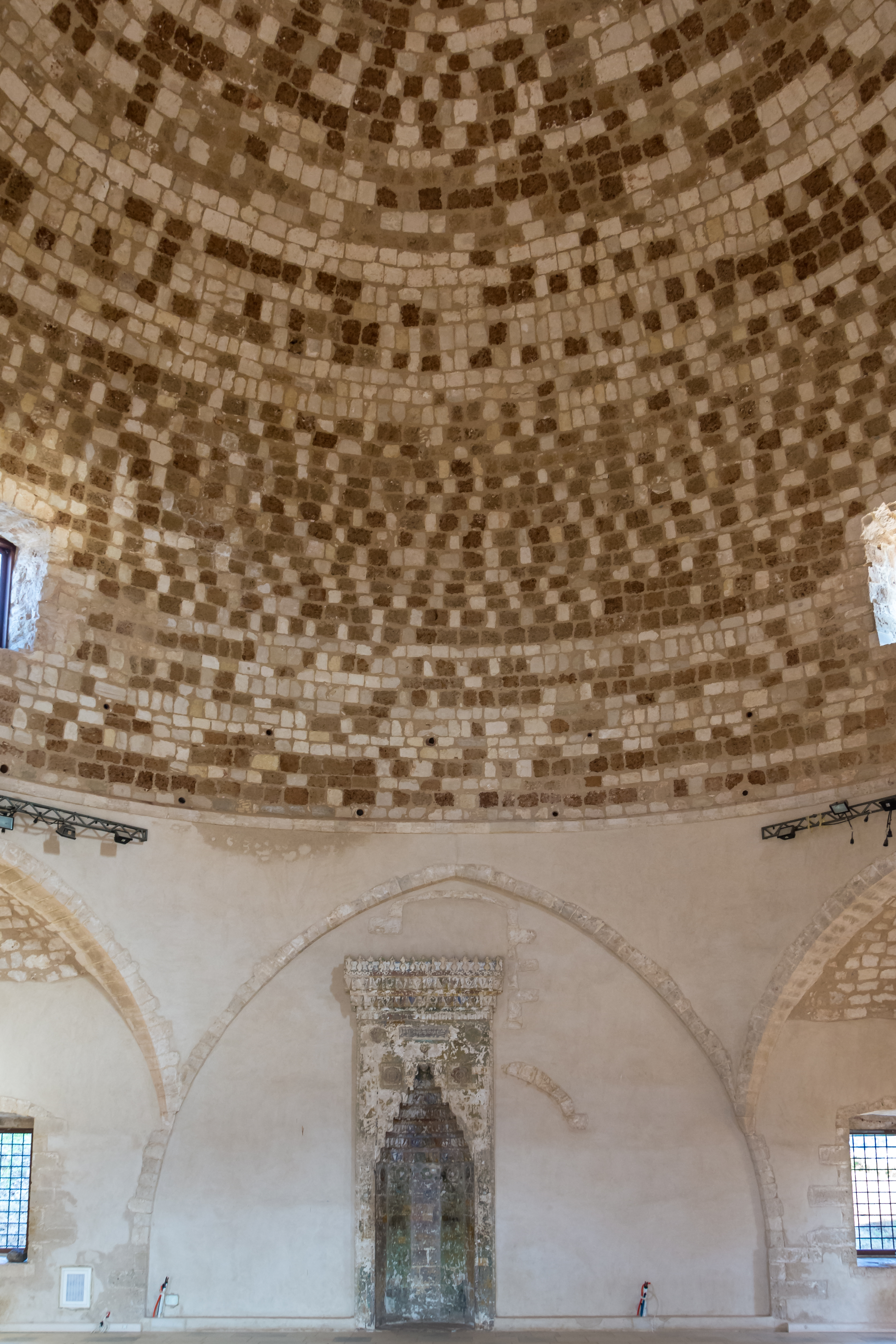
The mihrab inside.

It was built on the site of the Venetian Cathedral, a church built around 1583-85 and dedicated to Saint Nicholas. The Venetians transferred the cathedral seat to the fortezza after the previous church was completely destroyed during the 1571 invasion. In 1585, the successor bishop Carrara refused to hold masses in the church, claiming that it was not adequately equipped and the space was too narrow.

Very shortly after the town of Rethymno was conquered by the Ottomans, they demolished the church and built the mosque, dedicated to Sultan Ibrahim I in 1648, with a large, imposing dome. The complaed became property of the city of Rethymno in 1971; it was restored between 2002 and 2004 by the Ephorate of Byzantine Antiquities, and now it is used as an exhibition center.

== Architecture ==
The mosque's dome is 11 metres (36 ft) in diameter, and rests on eight arches. Today, the spherical triangles formed in the corners from the arches on its four walls can still be seen, and so does the arch above the entrance. Furthermore, the mihrab with its elaborate relief designs and the base of the demolished minaret inside the building are also still visible. The minaret, which once stood on the northwestern corner of the church/mosque, collapsed at the beginning of the twentieth century, and was never rebuilt.

== See also ==
- Islam in Greece
- List of former mosques in Greece
- Ottoman Crete

== Bibliography ==
- Katsipoulaki, Basileia (2009). Η τουριστική κίνηση του νομού Ρεθύμνης: Εξέλιξη και προοπτική [The tourist activity of the prefecture of Rethymno: Evolution and perspective] (Thesis) (in Greek). Kavala, Greece.
- Kolovos, Elias (2015). "Monuments sans héritiers ? Les édifices ottomans de Crète". Anatoli. 6 (6): 237–256. doi:10.4000/anatoli.308.
- Katsarakis, Antonis (2022). "The Architectural Grid ofIbrahim Han Mosque in Réthymnon, Crete". Nexus Network Journal 24 (2022):203–216
