= Veli Pasha Mosque =

Veli Pasha Mosque can refer to:

- Veli Pasha Mosque (Ioannina), an Ottoman mosque in Ioannina, Greece.
- Veli Pasha Mosque (Rethymno), an Ottoman mosque in Rethymno, Greece.
