= Valide Mosque, Mytilene =

Former mosque in Mytilene, Greece

Valide Mosque
- Βαλιδέ Τζαμί
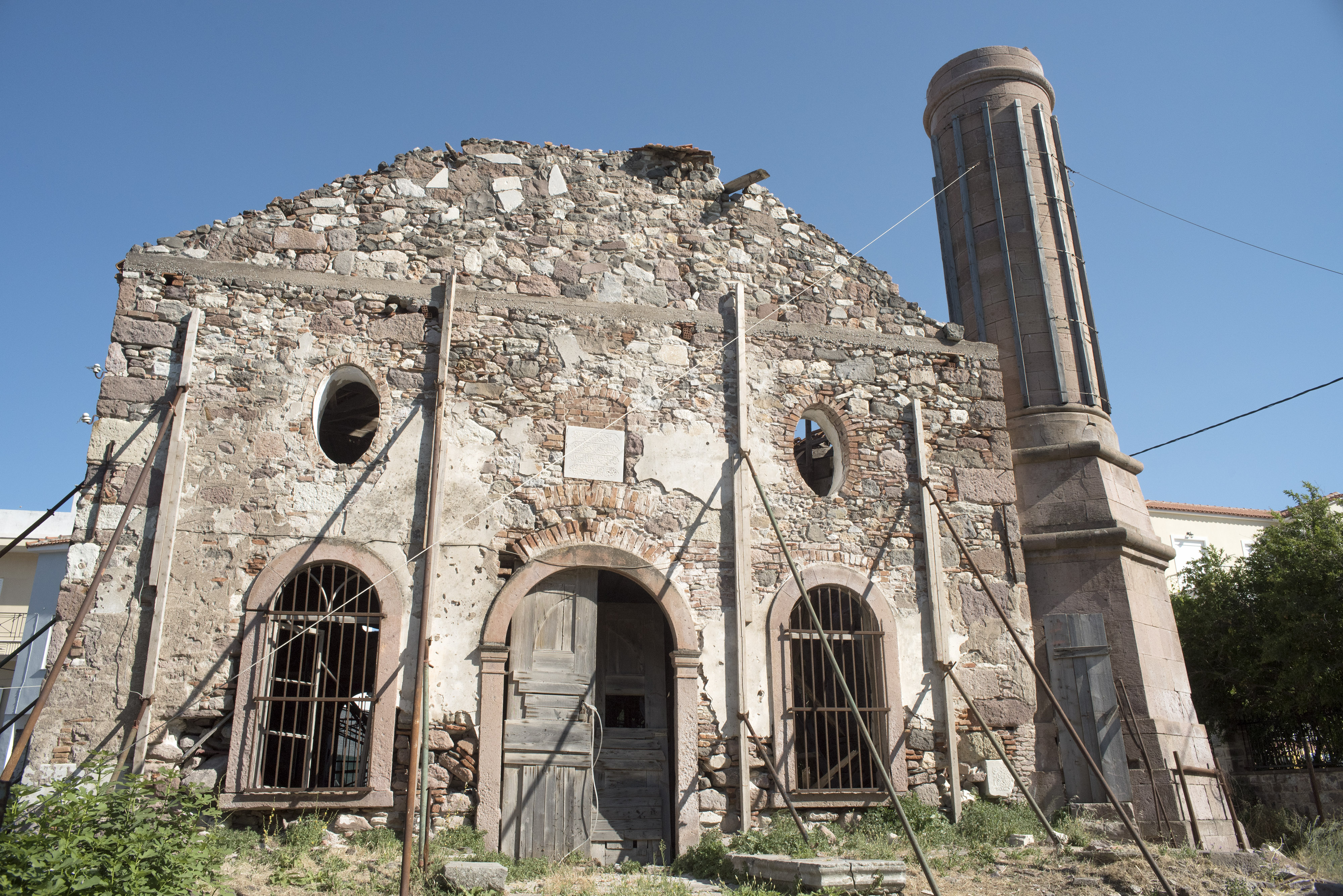
- The former mosque in 2015

- Location of the former mosque in Greece

Religion
- Affiliation: Islam (former)
- Ecclesiastical or organizational status: Mosque (1615–1920s)
- Status: Museum

Location
- Location: Vintsentzou Kornarou Street, Epano Skala, Mytilene, Lesbos, North Aegean
- Country: Greece
- Interactive map of Valide Mosque
- Coordinates: 39°06′43″N 26°33′15″E

Architecture
- Type: Mosque
- Style: Ottoman
- Completed: 1615

Specifications
- Minaret: 1
- Minaret height: 15 m (49 ft)
- Materials: Stone; marble; stucco

The Valide Mosque (Greek: Βαλιδέ Τζαμί, from Turkish: Valide Camii, lit. 'Mosque of the Valide Sultan'), known locally as the Valide Djami, is a former mosque in Mytilene, on the island of Lesbos, in the North Aegean region of Greece. Completed in 1615 during the Ottoman era, the mosque was abandoned in the 1920s, following the Balkan Wars and the Greco-Turkish population exchange, and was left in a partial ruinous state. The mosque was renovated in 2026, and now is utilized as a history museum of Mytilene.

== History ==
The mosque is located in the old Turkish quarter of the city, Epano Skala. According to its founder's inscription above its entrance, it was built in 1615, making it one of the oldest mosques in the island. However, another source claims that the current structure was built in 1780 on the site of an older mosque and the current structure is an 1867 renovation.

The building and its minaret were designated as protected monuments by the Hellenic Ministry of Culture in 1981. In early 2018, €1.2 million were designated for restoration work of the building, under the supervision of the Lesbos Ephorate of Antiquities. In 2020, following the reversion of the Hagia Sophia from a museum to mosque by the Turkish president Recep Tayyip Erdoğan, there were calls to halt the restoration of the Valide Mosque. The former mosque remained closed for the following, in partial ruins. Renovation works were completed by mid-July 2026, when it was inaugurated by Greek Minister of Culture Lina Mendoni; the restored mosque now functions as a museum of Lesbian history, covering the eras between 1462 and 1914.

== Description ==
It was built of stone and is a single-storey structure, with a pitched roof. A stone-paved courtyard once existed with a marble polygonal water fountain, accessed through a marble staircase. On all four sides of this building there are symmetrical pairs of large windows protected by metal grids and oval skylights. The interior floor was covered by wood planks, while a five-way archway separating the esonarthex from the prayer hall.

The ceiling was in coloured frescos, which were later painted over in a dark pigment after the Muslim population left the island. The c. 6-metre-high (20 ft) mihrab featured stucco decoration. The Ottoman-style minaret is constructed from red stone quarried in Ayvalık, and the original 15-metre (49 ft) minaret is almost entirely preserved apart from a portion of its domed top. It has a hexagonal base and a cylindrical shaft.

== See also ==
- Islam in Greece
- List of former mosques in Greece
- Ottoman Greece
