= Veli Pasha Mosque (Rethymno) =

Former mosque in Rethymno, Greece

- Βελή Πασά Τζαμί
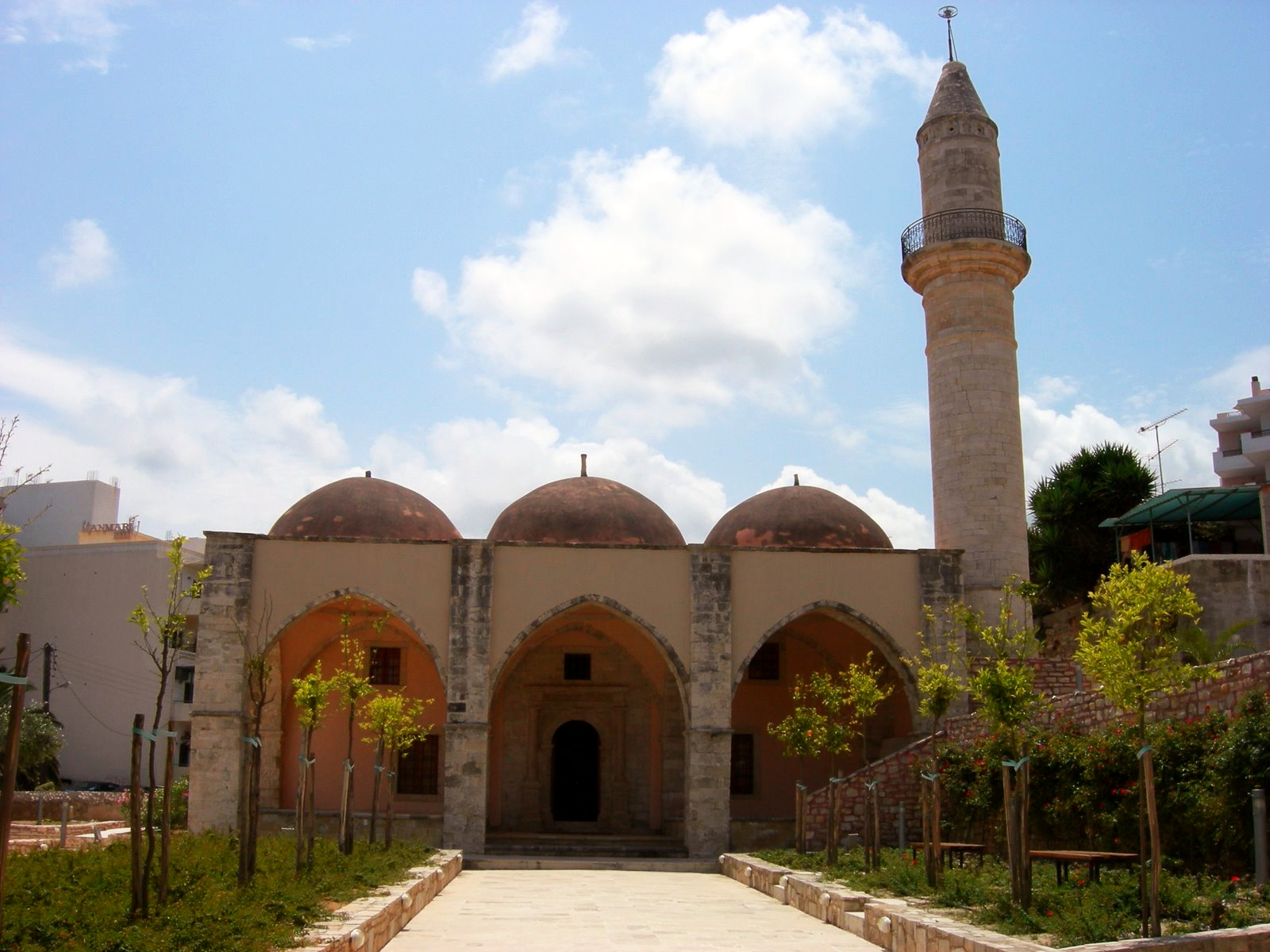
- The former mosque

- Location of the former mosque, now museum, in Crete

Religion
- Affiliation: Islam (former)
- Ecclesiastical or organizational status: Mosque (1650s–1910s)
- Status: Abandoned (as a mosque); Repurposed (as a museum)

Location
- Location: Rethymno, Crete
- Country: Greece
- Interactive map of Veli Pasha Mosque
- Coordinates: 35°21′49″N 24°28′40″E

Architecture
- Type: Mosque
- Style: Ottoman
- Completed: 1650s

Specifications
- Dome: 9
- Minaret: 1
- Materials: Bricks; stone

The Veli Pasha Mosque (Greek: Βελή Πασά Τζαμί, from Turkish: Veli Paşa Camii), also known as the Mastaba Mosque (Greek: Τζαμί του Μασταμπά) from its location, is a former mosque in the town of Rethymno, on the island of Crete, in south Greece. Originally built in the mid-17th century, during the Ottoman era, shortly after the fall of Rethymno to the Ottomans, the mosque was abandoned in the 1910s, and, since 2008, was repurposed as the Paleontological Museum of Rethymno (Greek: Παλαιοντολογικό Μουσείο Ρεθύμνου), a paleontological history museum for the island of Crete, administered by the Goulandris Natural History Museum.

== History ==
The Veli Pasha Mosque was built outside the walls by a supporter of Gazi Hüseyin Pasha on the site of an older Christian church dedicated to Saint Onuphrius. It is associated with the conquest of Rethymno by the Ottomans in 1646; on the site that the Ottoman troops made their military camp, the Muslim community of the town would later erect the mosque of Veli Pasha, perhaps around 1651. The oldest attestation of the mosque dates from 1657, in the account of the local governor of Rethymno.

It was heavily damaged by bombing in World War II. The monument was later restored in the early 2010s and houses the Paleontological Museum of Rethymno. It was granted to the Goulandris Natural History Museum by decision of the Hellenic Ministry of Culture and Sports, and officially opened to the public in 2008.

== Architecture ==
Veli Pasha Mosque has a roof with six small domes and a portico surmounted by three larger domes, amounting to nine domes in total. Its old complex also included thirteen cells, a tekke, an institution for the gathering of dervishes, who in those years followed the armies and played an important role in the socialization of urban and rural Muslims.

Its tall and intact minaret was, according to an inscription, constructed in 1204 AH (1789/1790 CE), making it Rethymno's oldest surviving minaret. The inscription also bears the words "God bless it! Glory and gratitude to the Lord... We made a donation and renovated the minaret so that the adhan can be heard and for God's mercy".

A semi-subterranean covered fountain lies to the east of the garden. According to the Ottoman traveler Evliya Çelebi, in 1670, the courtyard was like a mythical earthly paradise in the Arabian desert, as many plants and shrubs grew in the garden.

== See also ==
- Islam in Greece
- List of former mosques in Greece
- List of museums in Greece
- Ottoman Crete
