= Siege of Rethymno (1646) =

- Part of the Cretan War (fifth Ottoman–Venetian war)
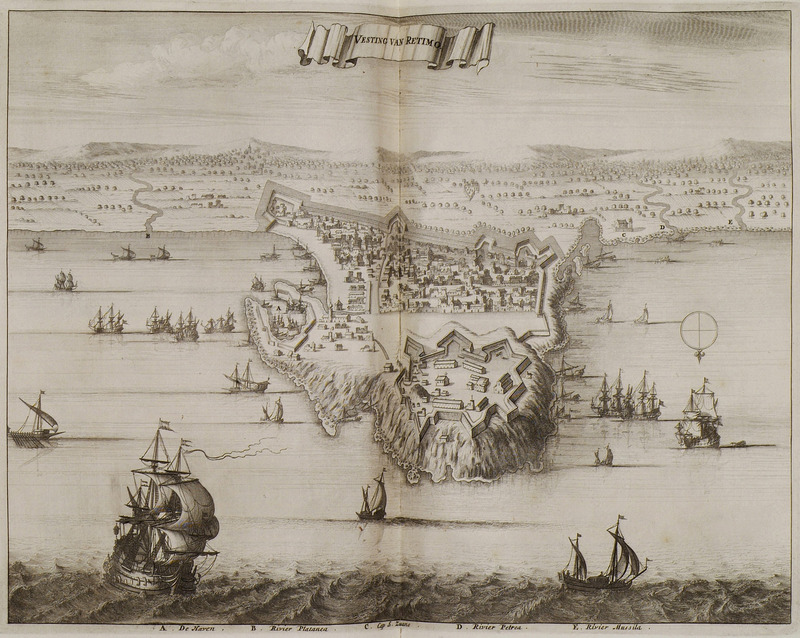
- Rethymno in 17th century
Date	11 October – 13 November 1646
Location	Rethymno, Crete
Result	Ottoman victory

Belligerents
Ottoman Empire	Republic of Venice

Commanders and leaders
Gazi Hüseyin Pasha	Luigi Minotto

Strength
Unknown	Unknown

Casualties and losses
Unknown	Unknown

The siege of Rethymno happened during the Cretan War when the Ottomans launched a campaign to conquer the city of Rethymno in Crete from the Venetians. The Ottomans captured the city in the end.

== Background ==
On June 4, 1646, a new Ottoman armada of 60 galleys and four galleasses emerged from Istanbul, reinforced by Barbary states, and sailed to Chania. The Venetians did not attempt to stop them fearing defeat. The Ottomans tried to storm Souda but failed. The Ottomans then turned to attack the city of Rethymno. Rethymno was in a ruined state such that a successful resistance was impossible. The walls and fortifications had long fallen into ruins; and worst of all, the population was desperate and rebellious. Soon after the conquest of Chania, the most prominent men had written to Hussein Pasha that they were ready to submit to the Sultan since they could no longer expect anything from Venice, and the people were fed up with the Venetian government, which they hated and which could not even provide them with protection.

== Siege ==
The Ottomans arrived in Rethymno on October 11. The Ottomans assaulted on October 20th which resulted in the capture of the city. Those who managed to escape rushed into the castle in terrible confusion. A Venetian commander, Cormaro, who had tried to maintain some semblance of order among the retreating, received a fatal bullet wound amid the chaos and died on the spot. Several other experienced Venetian commanders were killed. The Venetians in the castle were led by Luigi Minotto. He and his 1,200-strong men resisted bravely, but the castle was unable to maintain their defense. Not only were the walls almost destroyed in only a few days by the Ottoman cannon fire, but inside the castle, many were sick with plague. In addition, there was a great lack of ammunition and the low morale began to prevail among the garrison. Minotto was therefore forced to raise the white flag on November 10. Hussein Pasha, whose troops were likewise greatly weakened by the plague, immediately stopped firing. The Venetians were allowed to leave Unharmed. The castle was surrendered three days later, on November 13.

== Sources ==
- Anderson, R. C. (1952). Naval Wars in the Levant 1559–1853. Princeton: Princeton University Press.
- Setton, Kenneth Meyer (1991). Venice, Austria, and the Turks in the Seventeenth Century. Philadelphia: The American Philosophical Society. ISBN 0-87169-192-2.
- Johann Wilhelm Zinkeisen, Osmanlı İmparatorluğu Tarihi 7 Cilt Takım Yeditepe Yayınları.
