= Trianon Mosque =

Former mosque in Nafplio, Greece

- Τζαμί Τριανόν
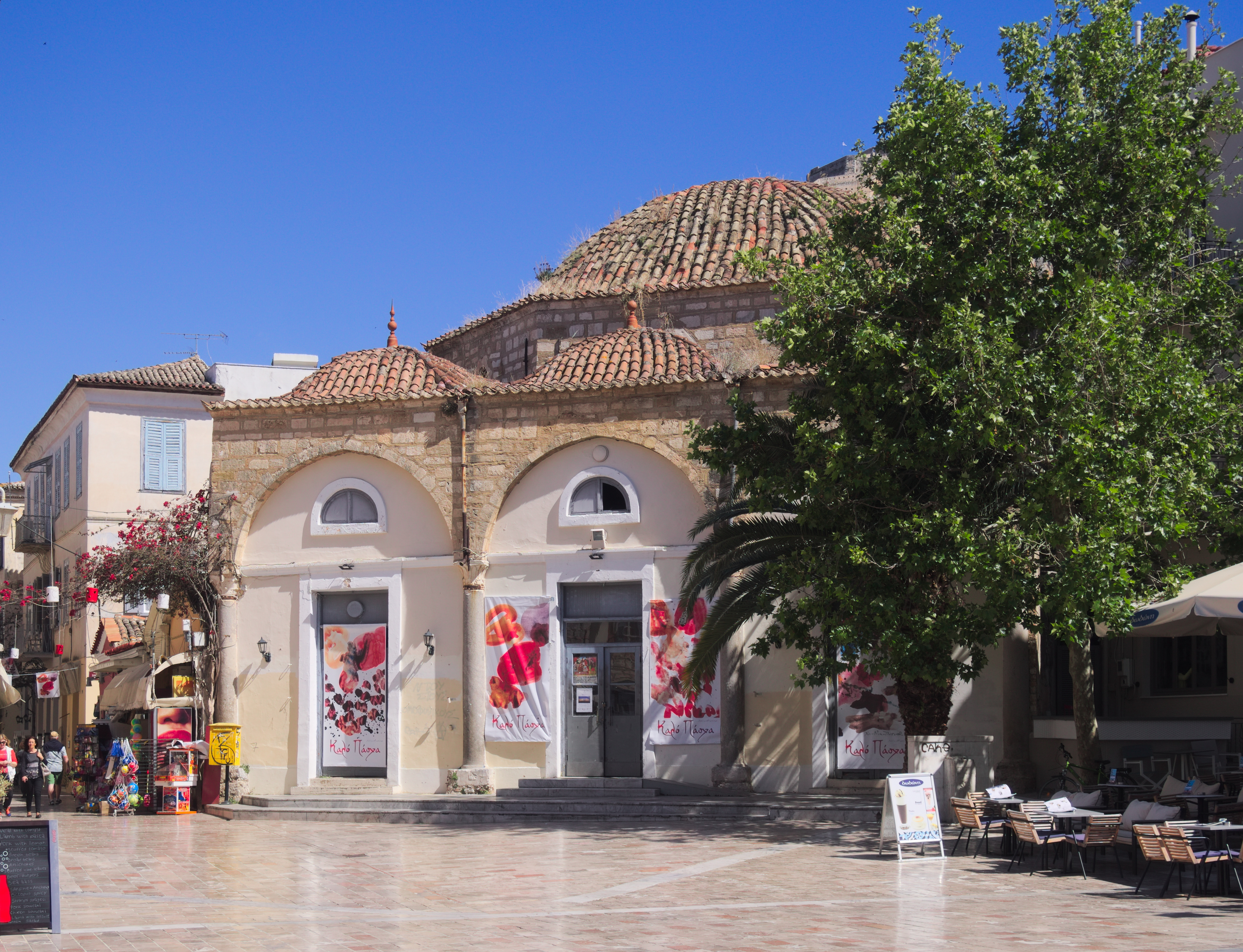
- The former mosque in 2016, as a cinema

- Location of the former mosque in Greece

Religion
- Affiliation: Islam (former)
- Ecclesiastical or organizational status: Mosque (1540s–1687); Church (1687–1715); Mosque (1715–1820s); Profane use (since 1823– )
- Status: Abandoned (as a mosque); Repurposed (as a cinema)

Location
- Location: Nafplio, Argolis, Peloponnese
- Country: Greece
- Interactive map of Trianon Mosque
- Coordinates: 37°33′57″N 22°47′51″E

Architecture
- Type: Mosque
- Style: Ottoman
- Founder: Aga Pasha
- Completed: c. 1540s

Specifications
- Dome: 1
- Minaret: 1 (destroyed)
- Materials: Stone; brick

The Trianon Mosque (Greek: Τζαμί Τριανόν), also known as the Old Mosque (Greek: Παλαιό Τζαμί) is a former mosque in the town of Nafplio, in the Peloponnese region of Greece.

Completed in the 16th century, during the Ottoman era, it is the oldest surviving example of Ottoman architecture in Nafplion. During Ottoman rule it was located in the Grand Vizier's quarter or the quarter of Sultan Ahmed, in the center of the town's market. The building was subsequently repurposed for profane use from c. 1823, including as a cinema and for cultural use.

== History ==
The mosque was constructed towards the end of the sixteenth century, or perhaps shortly before 1666-1667, during the first period of the Ottoman era in the Peloponnese. When the Venetians took over the Peloponnese in 1687, it was converted into a church dedicated to Saint Anthony of Padua, but it was reconsecrated as a mosque upon the Ottoman reconquest in 1715.

During the first years of the Greek War of Independence, in c. 1823, it was used for profane purposes, including to house the Charitable Society of Nafplio, which tended to the poor, the sick, and children orphaned during the war, as well as educate these children. Upon Greece's independence in 1830, it was converted into a mutual-teaching school for poor families (a type of school where older students teach the younger ones); the first governor of Greece, Ioannis Kapodistrias, further enforced the institution on his own expense.

King Otto of Greece abolished the mutual-teaching type school, and established instead state-sponsored schools in their place. For 53 years, from 1831 to 1884, the former Trianon Mosque functioned as a school before it was closed due to health concerns. For some years it worked as the Nafplio Magistrate's Court as well as the town's metropolitan church. In 1893 it was renovated and turned into a conservatory and a theater, and then in 1937 it was turned into the Trianon municipal cinema, by which name the former mosque is known to the residents of Nafplio today. Since 1993 it has been the seat of the Municipal Theater of Nafplio, while it is also used for cultural events and exhibitions. It is one of Nafplio's smallest cinemas which sometimes shows adult films.

== Architecture ==
Built with brick and stone, the former Trianon Mosque is a building with a simple rectangular plan, and an octagonal dome. Its entrance has an arched, colonnaded porch sheltered by three smaller domes; to the west of the building there used to be a small courtyard, which is not preserved today. Due to its various uses throughout history, the building has undergone many changes from its original form. The former mosque is simple, without special features, tributes, decorations or large minarets (the minaret was not preserved). In order to serve the needs arising from the new functions, false ceilings were added in 1915, thus covering the domes, internal staircases and reinforced concrete mezzanine. The architectural elements of the former mosque are no longer entirely visible, since a part of the lower part of the building was buried as the soil rose, while the narthex with the columns was covered with a wall.

Ottoman traveller Evliya Çelebi who visited Nafplio recorded the existence of three mosques, two on the market place, and described them both as stone mosques with brick domes, and a minaret made of stone as well. The former Trianon Mosque is located approximately 100 metres (330 ft) from the Agha Pasha Mosque, commonly known as the Vuleftikon Mosque, on the other side of the Syntagma Square. It is aligned with the Qibla on the 132° 44'.

== See also ==
- Islam in Greece
- List of former mosques in Greece
- Ottoman Greece

== Bibliography ==
- Ameen, Ahmed (2017). Islamic architecture in Greece: Mosques. Alexandria, Egypt: Center for Islamic Civilization studies, Bibliotheca Alexandrina – via academia.edu.
- Pantazis, Georgios; Lambrou, Evangelia (2009). "Investigating the orientation of eleven mosques in Greece". Journal of Astronomical History and Heritage. 12 (2): 15–166. Bibcode:2009JAHH...12..159P. doi:10.3724/SP.J.1440-2807.2009.02.08. ISSN 1440-2807.
