= Agha Pasha Mosque =

Former mosque in Nafplio, Greece

- Τζαμί Αγά Πασά
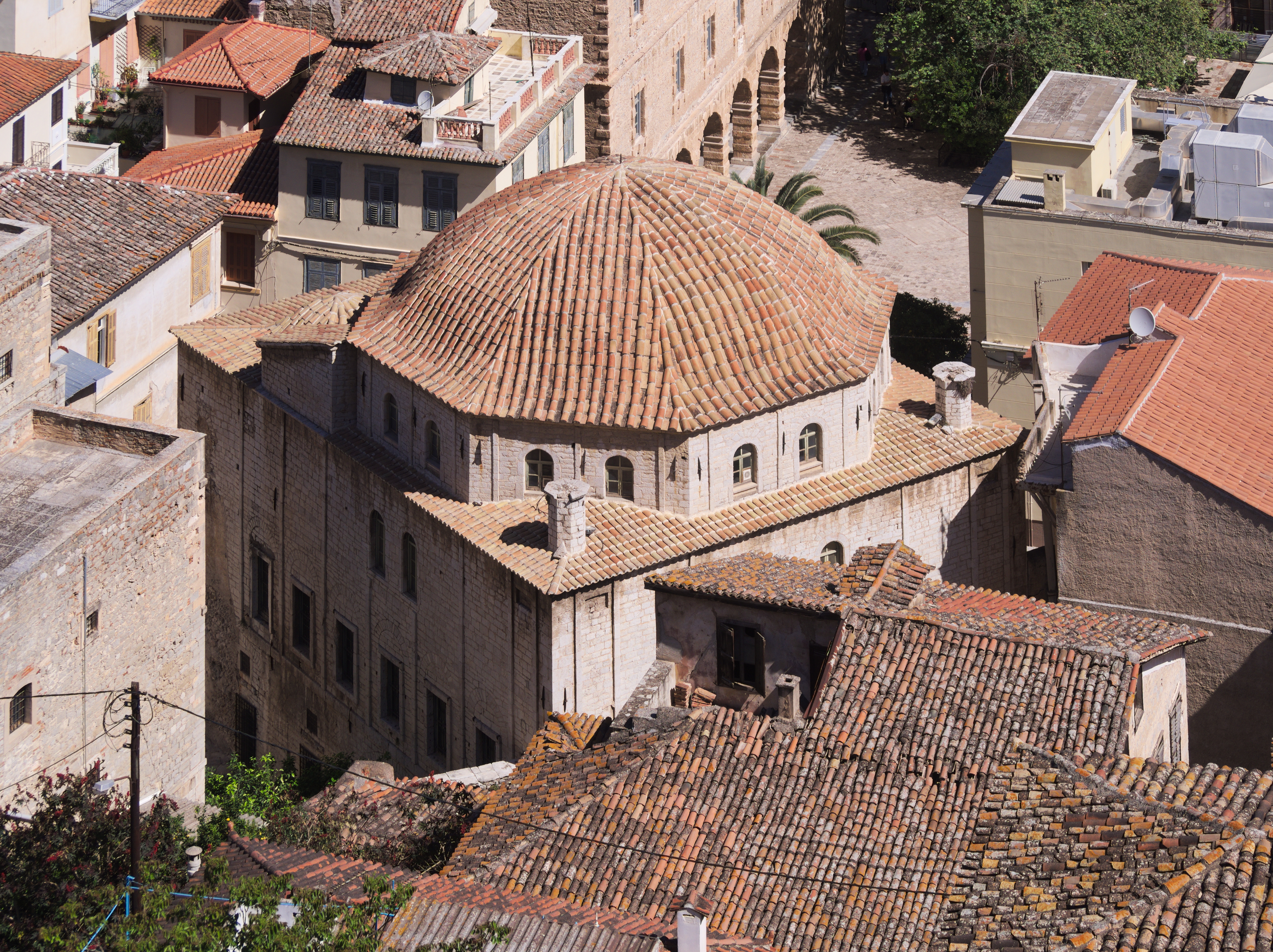
- Aerial view of the former mosque

- Location of the former mosque in Greece

Religion
- Affiliation: Islam (former)
- Ecclesiastical or organisational status: Mosque (c. 1810–1820s); Parliament house (1825–1827); Profane use (since 1830s– )
- Status: Abandoned (as a mosque); Repurposed (for cultural use)

Location
- Location: Nafplio, Argolis, Peloponnese
- Country: Greece
- Interactive map of Agha Pasha Mosque
- Coordinates: 37°33′57″N 22°47′51″E

Architecture
- Architect: Antonios Rhigopoulos
- Type: Mosque
- Style: Ottoman
- Completed: c. 1810–1820

Specifications
- Dome: 1
- Minaret: 1 (destroyed)
- Materials: Stone; brick

The Agha Pasha Mosque (Greek: Τζαμί Αγά Πασά, from Turkish: Ağa Paşa Camii), also commonly known as the Parliament House (Greek: Βουλευτικό), is a former mosque in the town of Nafplio, Peloponnese, in southern Greece, built by architect Antonios Rhigopoulos.

It was finished c. 1810–1820, during the second period of Ottoman rule in the town, and it briefly functioned as the first parliament building of the Provisional Administration of Greece, hence its common name. Today, no longer open to worship, it houses cultural events.

== Legend ==
According to local legend, the mosque was commissioned by a local Turkish agha who wanted to atone for a crime he had committed and salvage his soul. The tale goes that two Venetian men, descendants of a very rich family, came to Nafplio to find a treasure that their father had hidden at the time when the town was under Venetian rule. With the aid of a map they had, they traced the treasure in question in the house of the Turkish agha, but he decided to keep the treasure for himself, and thus he slew the two men. Later he felt remorse for his actions and so, using the gold from the treasure, he built the mosque which has ever since been known as the Aga Pasha Mosque. He never lived to see it completed, as he killed himself by jumping off a balcony.

== History ==
Given the absence of written sources and the multiple changes of use that have significantly altered the original design of the building, the exact date of construction of the mosque remains a mystery. The sources also differ as to the identify of the sponsor of the building. The so-called Agha Pasha could be identified in the Ottoman archives as Ragıb Pasha, provincial general (mirmiran), who resided in Nafplion and died around August 1820. The mosque would have been completed between 1818 and 1820, according to the plans of its architect, Antonios Rhigopoulos.

The archaeologist Semne Karouzou as well as the authors of the reference ministerial publication on Ottoman architecture in Greece, suggest a construction date between the end of the eighteenth century and the beginning of the nineteenth century. Other authors have instead suggested the earlier dates 1716 or 1730, although this view is considered outdated.

=== First Parliament of the Hellenic Republic ===
During the Greek War of Independence which broke out in 1821, and following the capture of the city by Greek forces in the following year, the new permanent national legislative body, called Parliamentary Corps (Βουλευτικόν Σώμα), decided to restore the ruined mosque in June 1824, so that it could serve as the seat of the assembly. The works were entrusted to the military engineer Theodoros Vallianos. A contract for an amount of 7,000 piastres was signed on March 12, 1825. The walls of the old mosque were plastered and whitewashed, while the covering of the domes and the openings were also renovated, as well as the interior, in particular the raised wooden floor which was traditionally reserved for women.

The inauguration of the new mosque, now the first parliament of modern Greece, took place on September 21, 1825. The building hosted plenary parliamentary sessions from the fall of 1825 up to the spring of 1826. Finally, on July 2, 1827, during some clashes that took place between the revolutionaries, a mortar hit the building, resulting in the death of the deputy Christos Gerothanasis who was inside at the moment. This tragic event marked the end of the parliamentary use of the Agha Pasha Mosque.

=== Successive usage ===
The Agha Pasha Mosque served as a ballroom at the beginning of the Regency, then was converted into a court. The place was notably the scene of the trial of Dimitrios Plapoutas and Theodoros Kolokotronis, two notable leaders of the Greek War of Independence, in 1834. Work was carried out the following year to transform the building and the neighboring madrasa into a prison. General Staikos Staïkopoulos, architect of the capture of the Palamidi fortress in November 1822, was imprisoned there.

Between 1915 and 1932, the mosque served as a storage place for the Archaeological Museum of Nafplion, which is located nearby. It has also served as a school, hospital, barracks and, more recently, a conservatory. Today it functions as a cultural and events space on the first floor, while the ground floor now houses the Nafplion Municipal Gallery.

== Architecture ==
The architect of the building was a Antonios Rhigopoulos from the village of Langadia, in Arcadia. The building, which stands on the current Syntagmatos Square, belongs to the architectural type of raised mosques (fevkani) with two floors. In its upper part, the monument has a rectangular prayer hall topped with an imposing dome. Access from the street is via a staircase leading to the main façade, where two muqarnas niches frame the entrance. A three-domed porch originally surmounted the current forecourt, destroyed by an earthquake in 1910. The lintel of one of the original doors of the mosque is composed of a column from the archaeological site of Mycenae. The masonry consists of isodomic cut limestone, potentially coming from the monastery of Karakala located about ten kilometers northeast of Nafplio. Inside the prayer hall, the mihrab with polychrome painted decoration was discovered in 1990 and highlighted during the mosque's restoration campaigns between 1994 and 1999.

In the lower part on the ground floor, the mosque consists of ten small rectangular rooms resulting from the rearrangements during the transformation into a prison. This space was initially devoted to commercial activities. A common passage with the neighboring madrasa constituted a secondary entrance for merchants and led to the base of the minaret located at the south-west corner, of which only a few traces remain today.

== Gallery ==
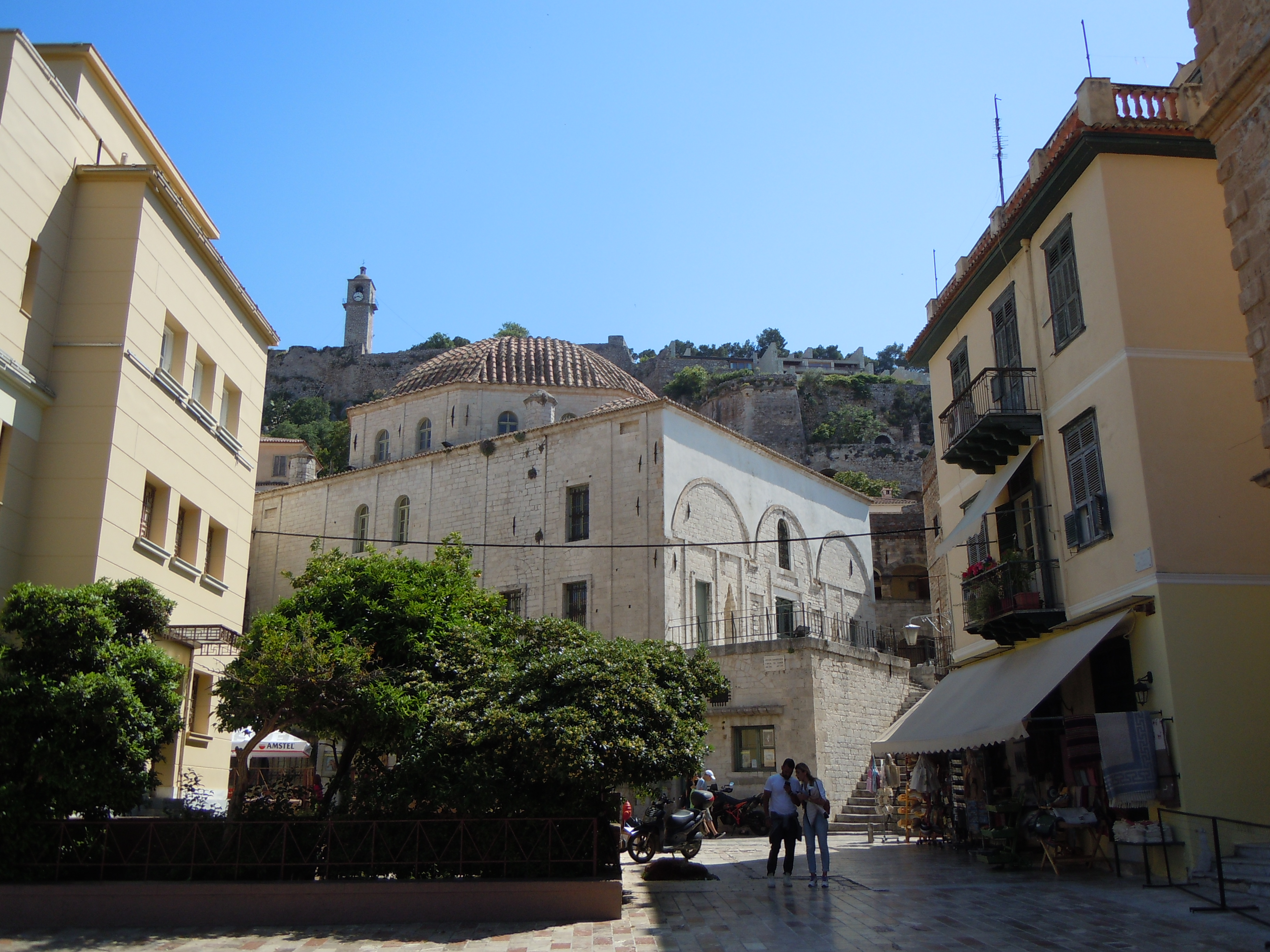
View of the mosque from Syntagma Square to the north

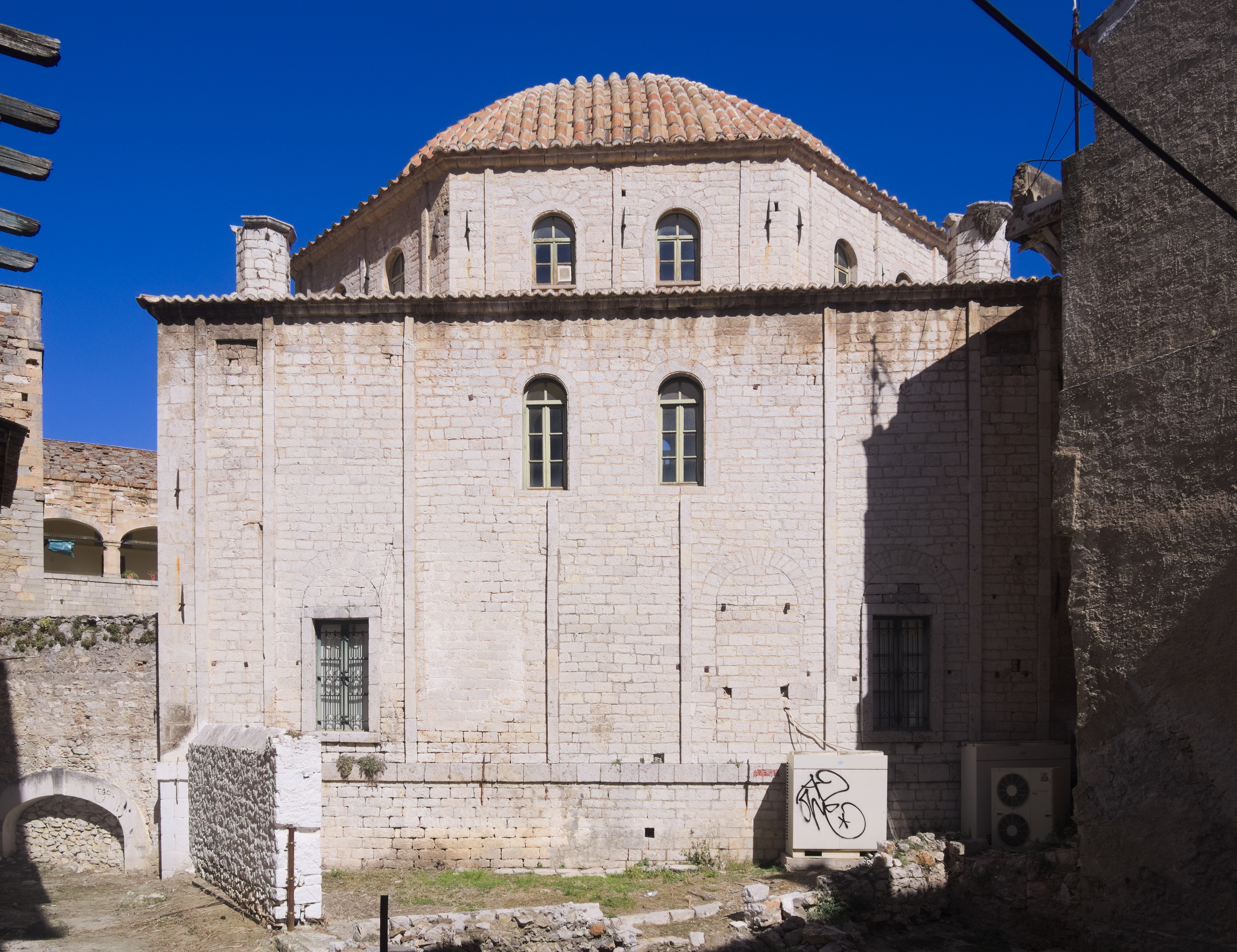
West view of the façade

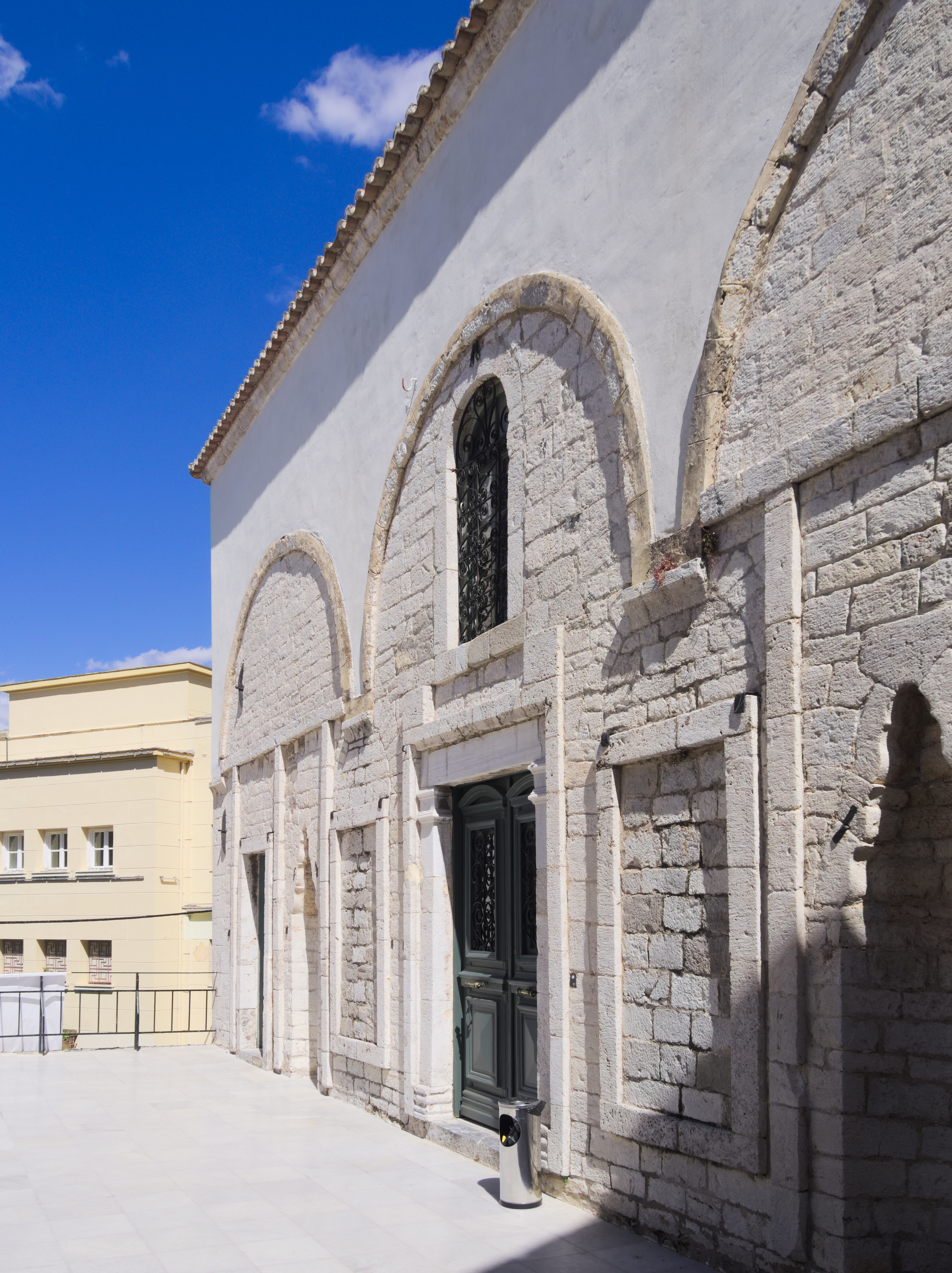
The main façade and traces of the porch

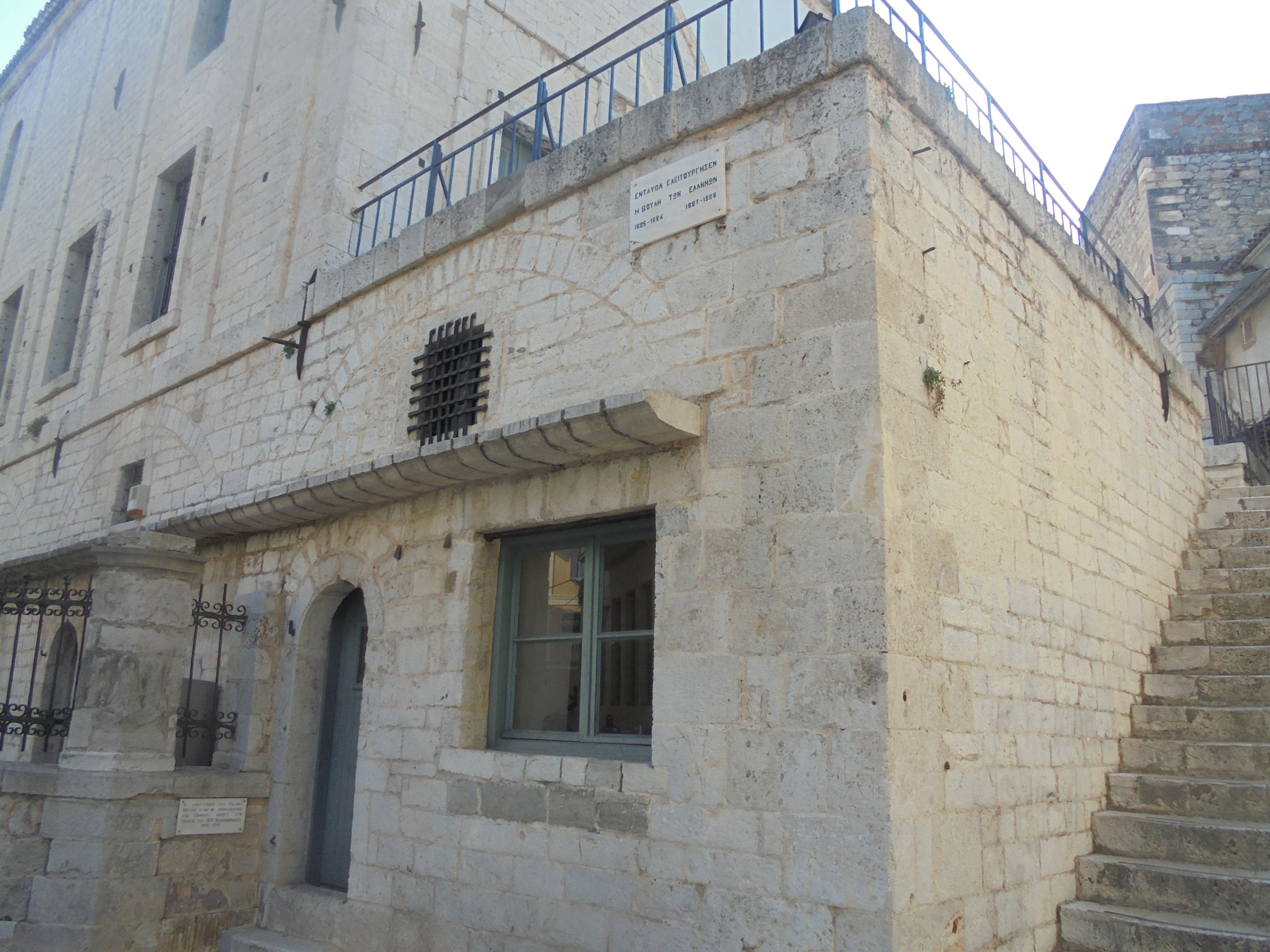
The lower part of the mosque

== See also ==
- Islam in Greece
- List of former mosques in Greece
- Ottoman Greece
