= Mustafa Pasha Mosque (disambiguation) =

Mustafa Pasha Mosque is an Ottoman-era mosque in Skopje, Macedonia.

Mustafa Pasha Mosque may also refer to:

- Atik Mustafa Pasha Mosque, an Ottoman-era mosque and former Byzantine-era church in Istanbul, Turkey
- Koca Mustafa Pasha Mosque, an Ottoman-era mosque and former Byzantine-era church in Istanbul, Turkey
- Lala Mustafa Pasha Mosque, an Ottoman-era mosque and former medieval church in Famagusta, Northern Cyprus
- Mustafa Pasha Mosque, an Ottoman-era mosque in Rhodes, Greece
