= Mustafa Pasha Mosque (Rhodes) =

Former mosque in Rhodes, Greece

- Τζαμί Μουσταφά Πασά
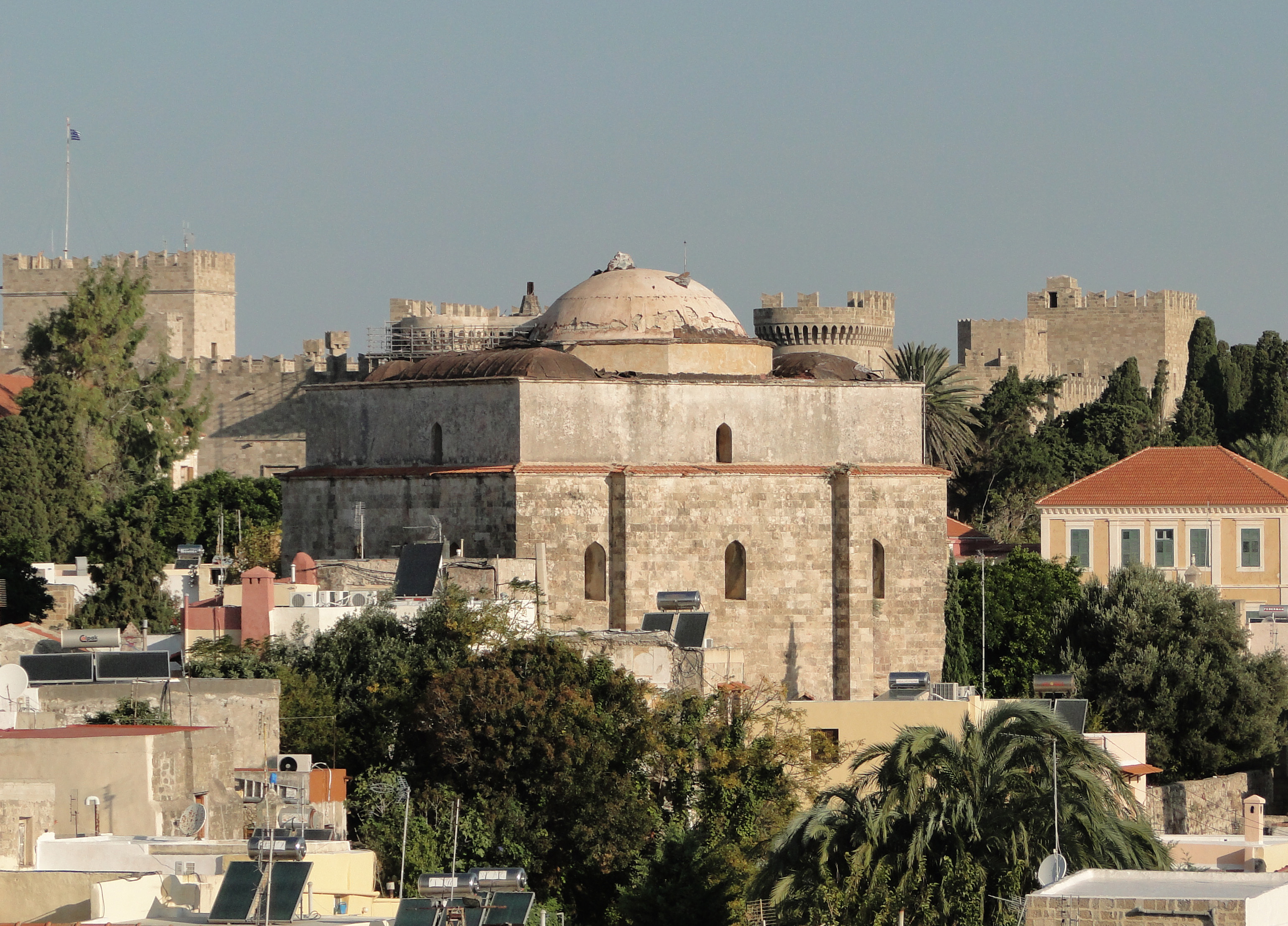

- Location of the former mosque in Greece

Religion
- Affiliation: Sunni Islam (former)
- Ecclesiastical or organizational status: Mosque (c. 1765–1940s)
- Status: Abandoned (as a mosque); Repurposed (for cultural use)

Location
- Location: Rhodes, South Aegean
- Country: Greece
- Interactive map of Mustafa Pasha Mosque
- Coordinates: 36°26′34″N 28°13′31″E

Architecture
- Type: Mosque
- Style: Ottoman
- Founder: Mustafa III
- Completed: c. 1765

Specifications
- Length: 13.7 m (45 ft)
- Width: 10.7 m (35 ft)
- Dome: 1
- Minarets: 1 (destroyed, 1973)
- Materials: Brick; stone; marble

The Mustafa Pasha Mosque (Greek: Τζαμί Μουσταφά Πασά, from Turkish: Mustafa Paşa Camii) is a former mosque located within the old walled town of Rhodes, on the eponymous island, in the South Aegean region of southern Greece. The structure stands on a small square right next to the town's hamam.

Completed in c. 1765, during the Ottoman era, the mosque was abandoned in the 1940s, and the structure preserved for cultural use. Although no longer used for worship, the structure has been occasionally made available to the Muslim community, especially for weddings.

== History ==
Located in Arionos Square, in the same area as Suleiman's bath, also known as the Yeni Hamam ("new bath"). A marble inscription on the door frame names its founder as Sultan Mustafa III, who erected the mosque around 1764 or 1765. The bath was also built by Sultan Mustafa.

The former mosque and the octagonal fountain in the yard were both registered by the Greek Ministry of Culture in 1948, shortly after the Dodecanese islands joined Greece following some decades of Italian rule. The minaret was taken down in 1973, and remains destroyed to this day. Likewise, the large marble portico of the mosque no longer exists.

The façade, coloured bright yellow, and the roof were renovated in the mid-2010s. The former mosque has been used as a wedding office by the Muslim community of the island since 1977.

== Architecture ==
The mosque has a rectangular shape, with interior dimensions of approximately 13.7 by 10.7 metres (45 by 35 ft). Its roof has one large dome in the center, surrounded by two vaults in the east-west direction, and two smaller, shallow domes in the middle. The central dome covers the square fronting the prayer-niche, while the rectangular vaults were chosen to accommodate the square shape of the roof. The use of vaults in Ottoman mosques, and in Rhodes in particular, is rather rare, so the vaults in the Mustafa Pasha Mosque constitute the sole example of their kind on the island of Rhodes. The vaults' roofs are covered with lead stripes.

The mihrab is not hollowed nor very deep, less than a quarter of a circle, significantly different in comparison to the niches in the mosques in other locations on Rhodes. The mihrab is crowned with an arch the shape of a crescent moon and surrounded by two cylindrical columns with a rectangular base and Corinthian capitals on their top. Nothing whatsoever survives of the portico, which was once considered to be one of the biggest in Rhodes' mosques; measuring approximately 17.5 by 6.5 metres (57 by 21 ft), consisting of two aisles, and arches that were carried by a total of four columns made of marble.

The minbar of the former mosque is among the largest of the surviving marble minbars on Rhodes, made of pieces of grey coloured marble and adorned with a top decorated with Arabic ornaments; underneath is found an inscription containing the Shahada, that is the Islamic declaration of faith.

== Gallery ==
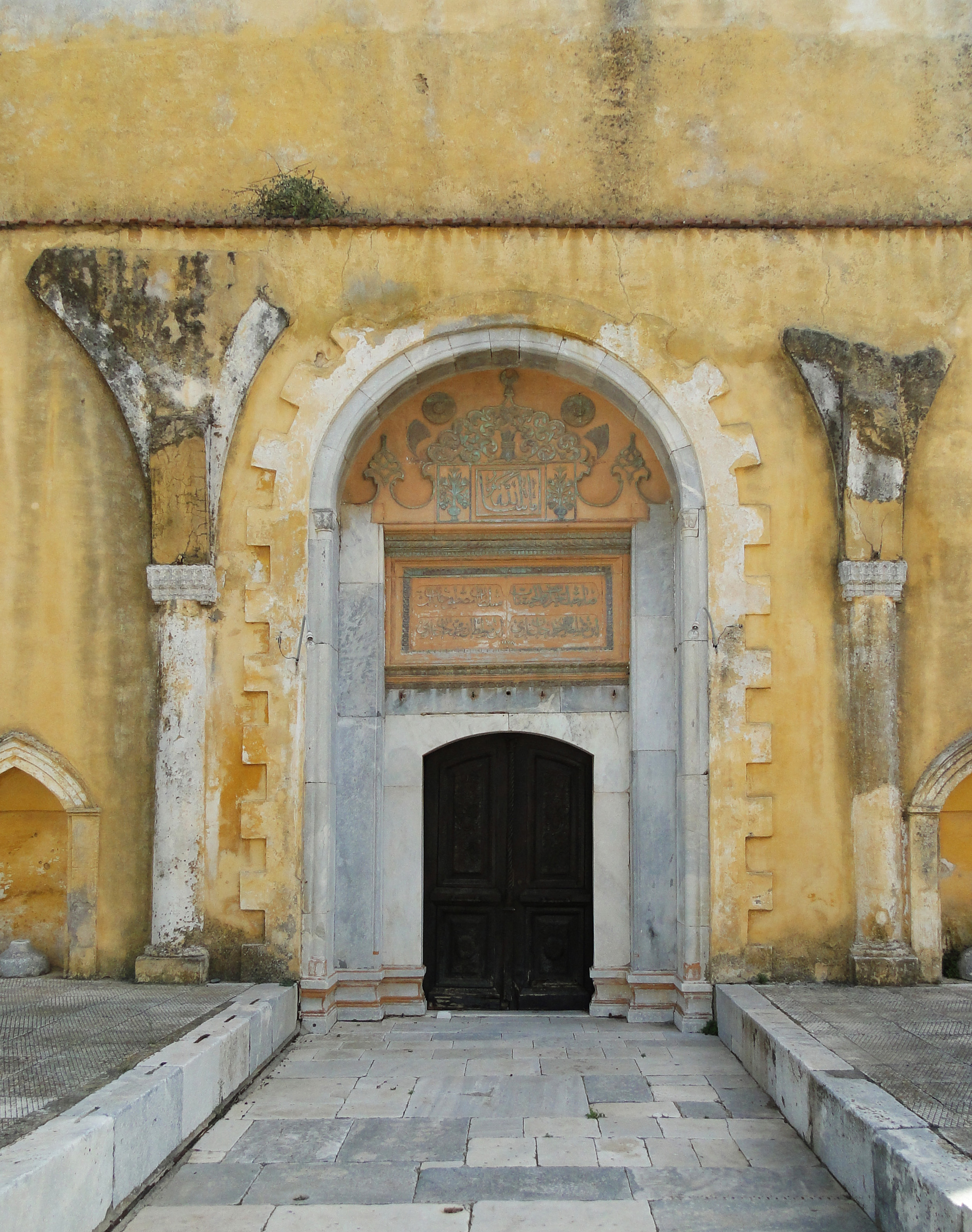
The entrance

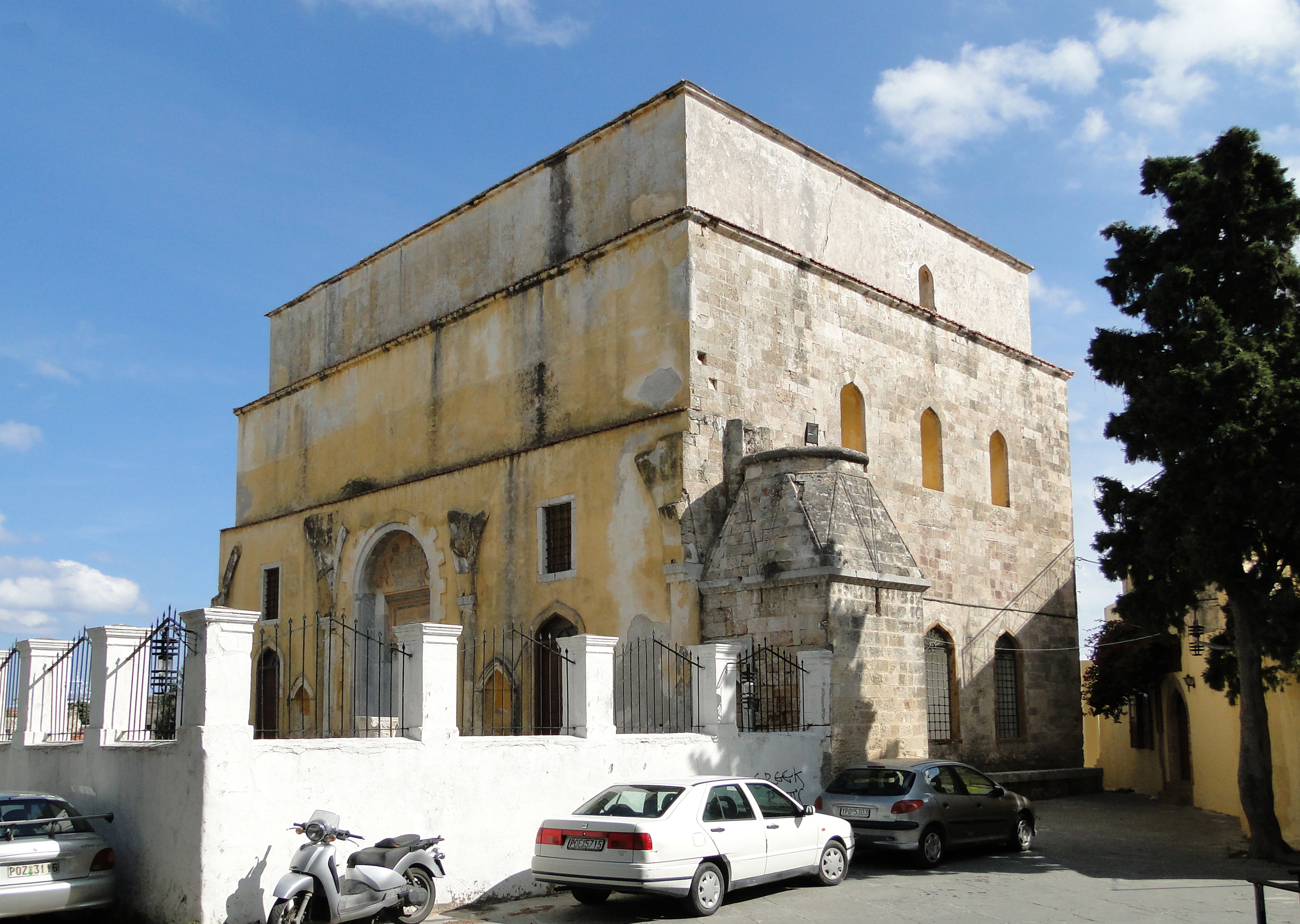
Lower view

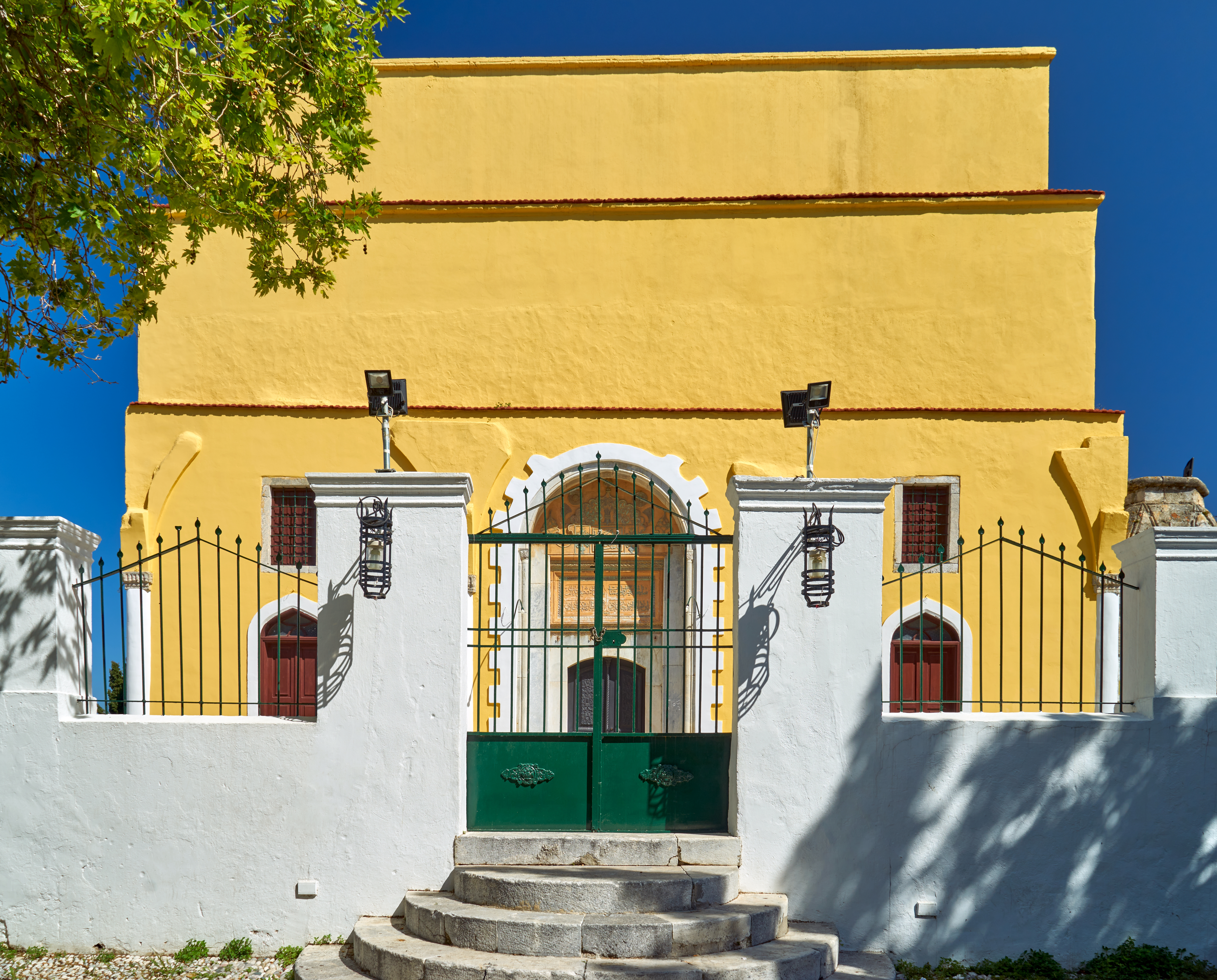
Façade

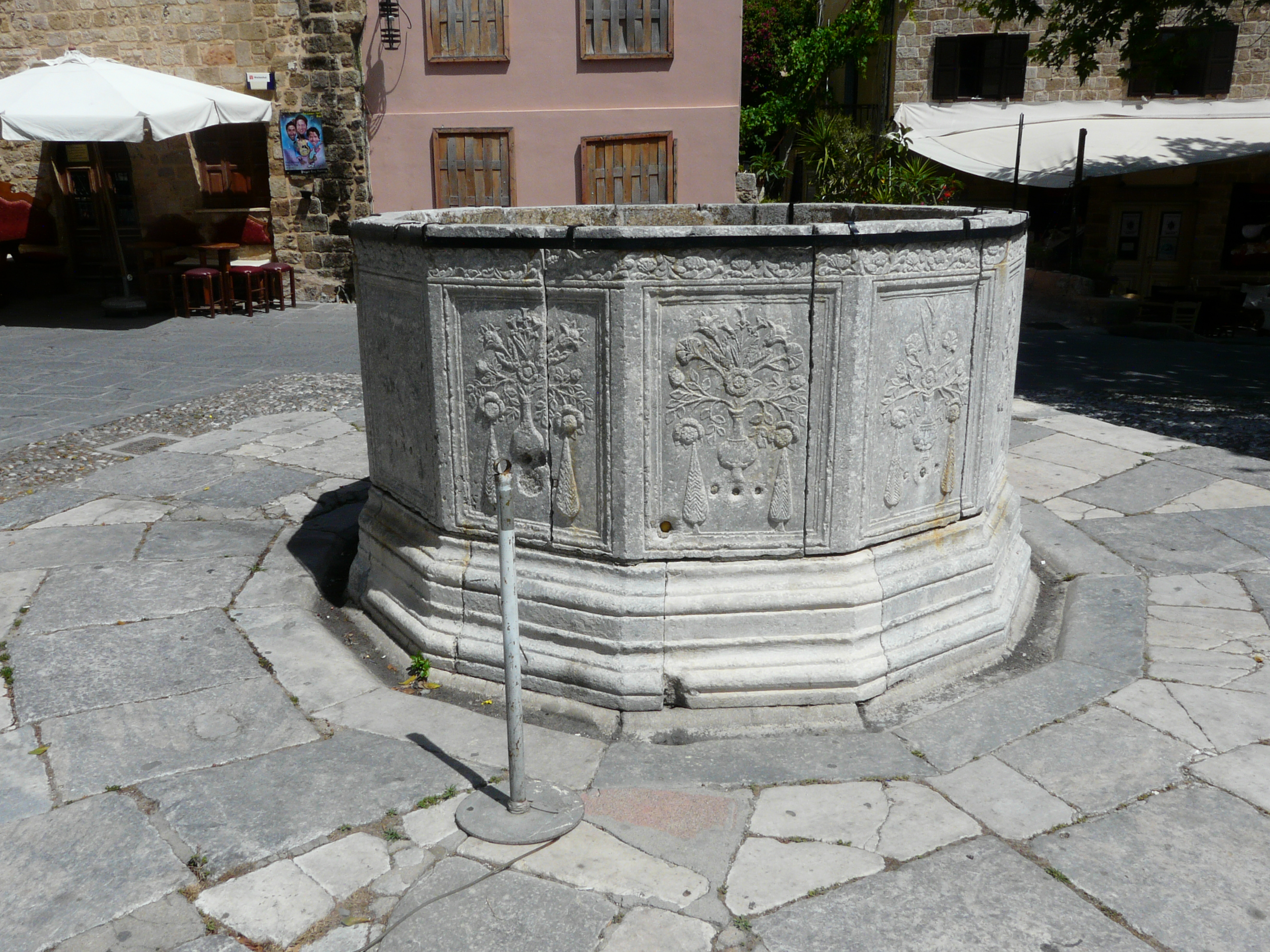
Fountain

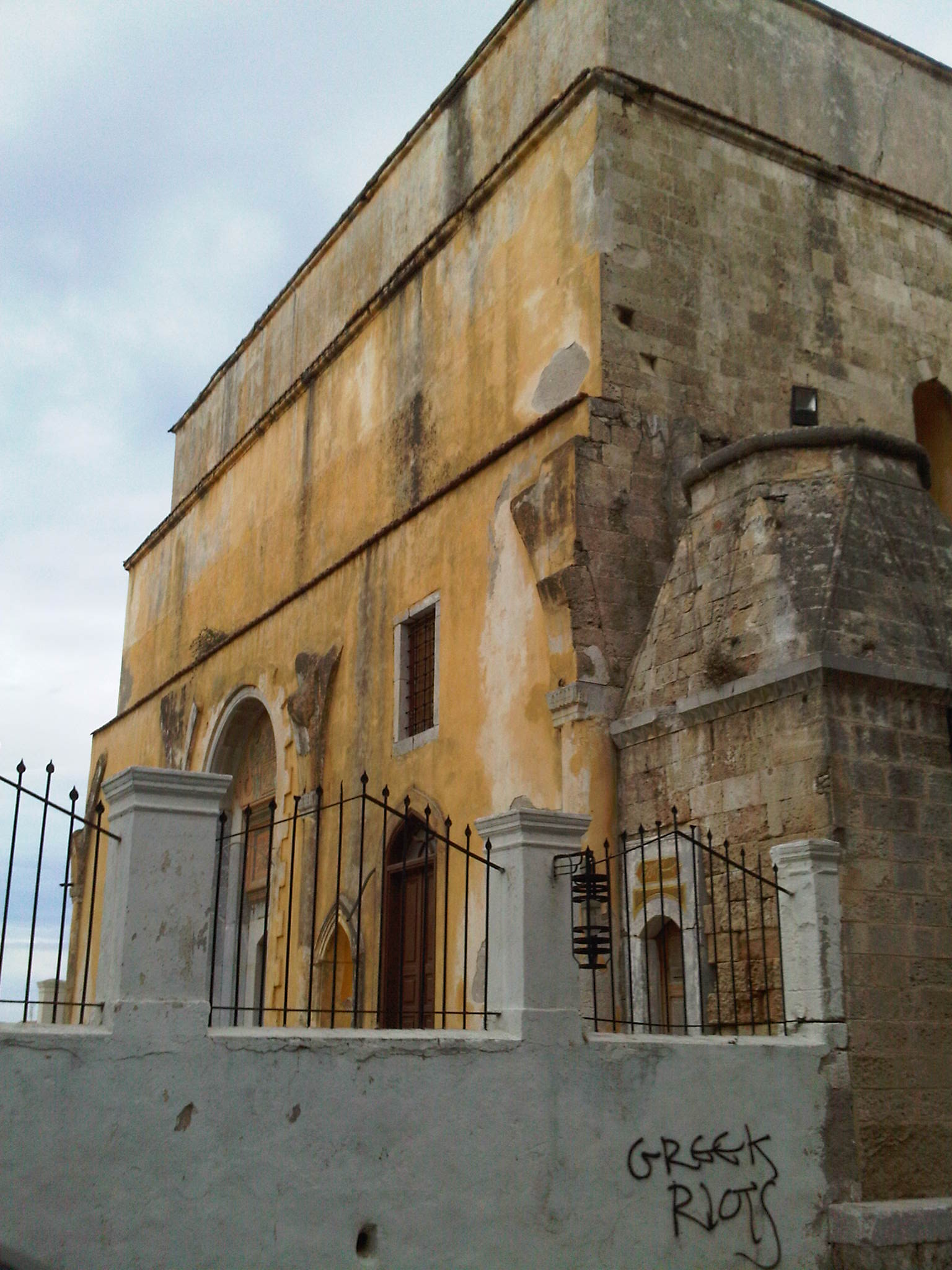
Remains of the minaret

== See also ==
- Islam in Greece
- List of former mosques in Greece
- Ottoman Greece

== Bibliography ==
- Kaurinkoski, Kira (2012). "The Muslim communities in Kos and Rhodes: Reflections on social organization and collective identities in contemporary Greece". In Lindstedt, Jouko; Wahlström, Max (eds.). Balkan encounters: old and new identities in South-eastern Europe (PDF). Helsinki: Slavica Helsingiensia (41). ISBN 978-952-10-8539-0.
- Konuk, Neval (2008). Ottoman architecture in Lesvos, Rhodes, Chios and Kos islands. Ankara: The Center for Strategic Research. ISBN 978-9757307693.
- Panagiotidi, Maria; Kalopisi, Sophia; Mamaloukos, Stavros (2010). Τα οθωμανικά τεμένη στην παλαιά πόλη της Ρόδου: Σουλτάν Σουλεϊμάν τζαμί, Μουράντ Ρέις τζαμί, Σουλτάν Μουσταφά τζαμί, Μεχμέτ Αγά τζαμί [The Ottoman mosques in the old town of Rhodes: Sultan Suleiman mosque, Murad Reis mosque, Sultan Mustafa mosque, Mehmet Agha mosque] (Thesis) (in Greek). pp. 23–25. doi:10.12681/eadd/25418.
