= Ibrahim Pasha Mosque, Rhodes =

Mosque in Rhodes, Greece

Ibrahim Pasha Mosque
- Ιμπραήμ Πασά Τζαμί
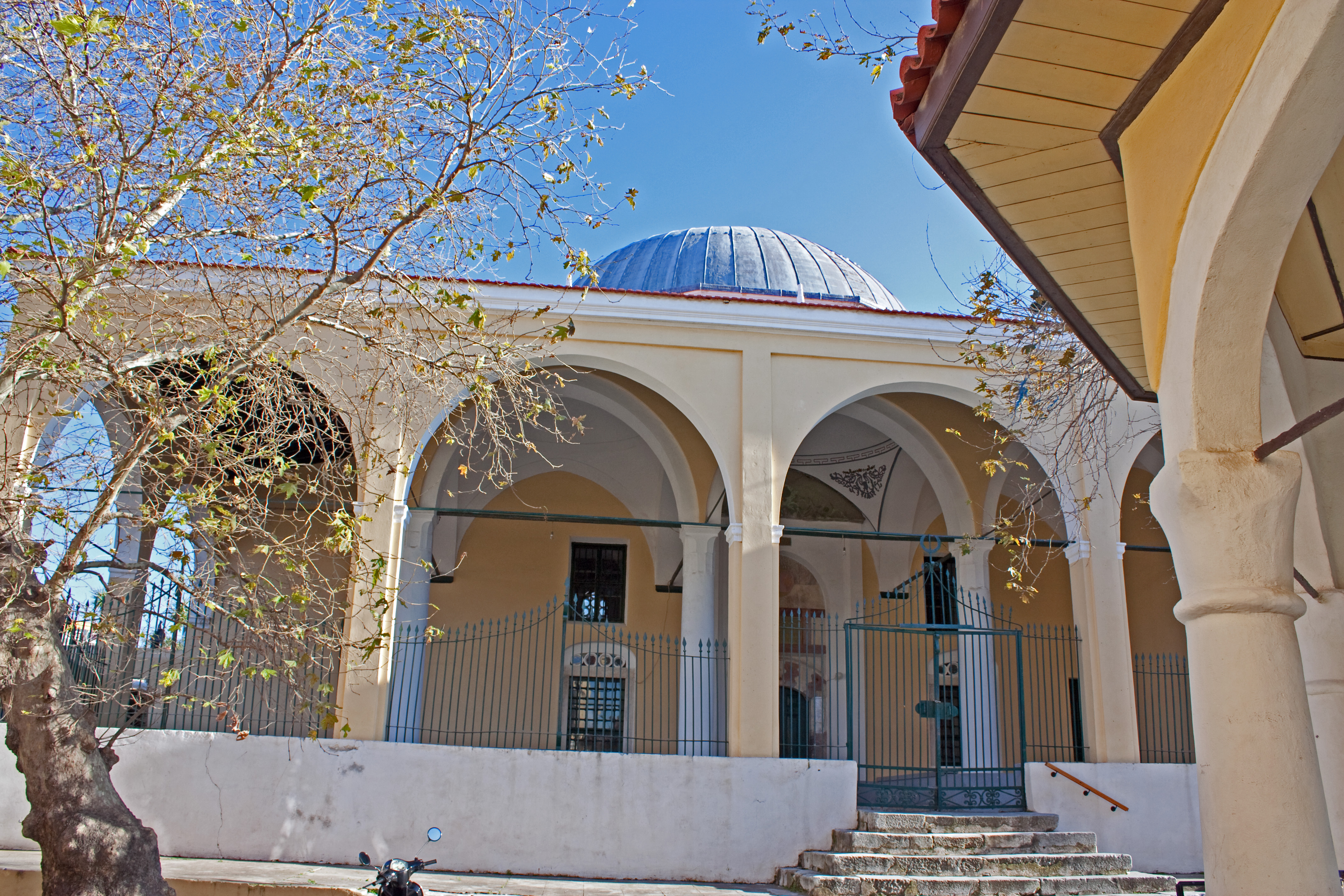
- The mosque in the old city of Rhodes

- Location of the mosque in Greece

Religion
- Affiliation: Islam
- Ecclesiastical or organizational status: Mosque
- Status: Active

Location
- Location: Rhodes, South Aegean
- Country: Greece
- Interactive map of Ibrahim Pasha Mosque
- Coordinates: 36°26′34″N 28°13′41″E

Architecture
- Type: Mosque
- Style: Ottoman
- Founder: Suleiman the Magnificent
- Completed: 1540-1541

Specifications
- Dome: 1
- Dome dia. (outer): 11.5 m (38 ft)
- Minaret: 1
- Materials: Stone; brick

The Ibrahim Pasha Mosque (Greek: Ιμπραήμ Πασά Τζαμί, from Turkish: İbrahim Paşa Camii) is a mosque on the Aegean island of Rhodes, Greece. Completed in c. 1541, during the Ottoman-era, it is the oldest out of the seven mosques inside the old walled city of Rhodes, and the only one open to worship today, serving the Turkish-Muslim community of Rhodes.

== History ==
After the Ottomans captured Rhodes from the Knights Hospitaller in 1522, Muslim Turkish populations settled within the walled city, where new mosques were built, while others were made from converted Christian churches in order to serve the new community.

The Ibrahim Pasha Mosque was built in 947 AH (1540/1541 CE) in what is today Platonos Square by Sultan Suleiman, and is thus the oldest mosque on the island.

The mosque's minaret had over the centuries suffered serious decay and damage. In the 1930s, where restoration works were commissioned under Italian rule.

Although it has continuously served as a mosque, it was officially granted an operating license by the Greek Ministry of Education and Religion only in 2019, along with the Defterdar and Gazi Hasan Pasha mosques in the neighbouring island of Kos.

== Architecture ==
Built within the old medieval town of Rhodes, the mosque consists of a large square room with a twelve-sided dome and two successive pediments alongside the north side. In the northwest corner of the roof, a minaret stands on a polygonal base. An eight-sided fountain can be found in the middle of the yard outside.

The minaret is cylindrical and has one balcony.

== Gallery ==
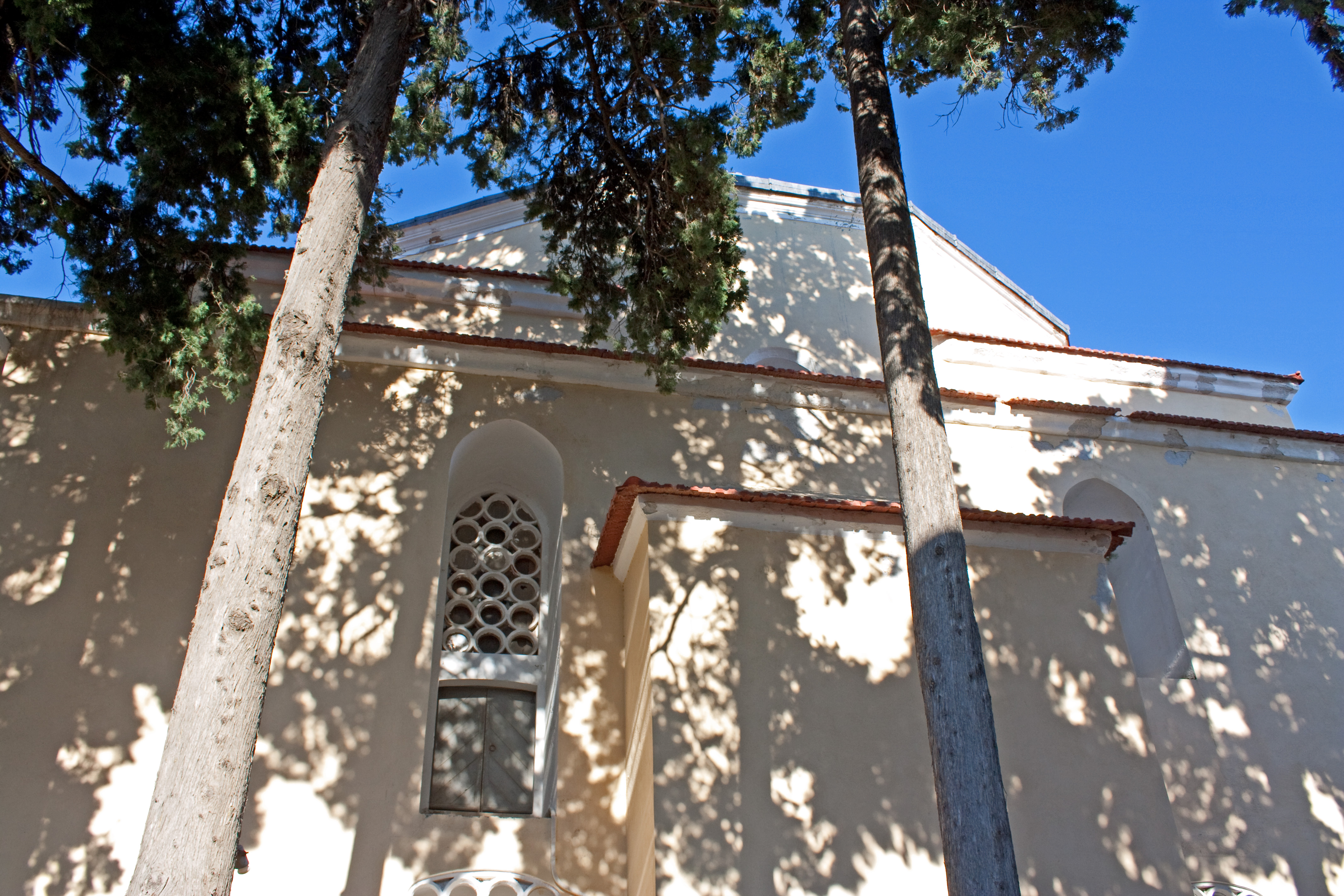
Walls of the mosque

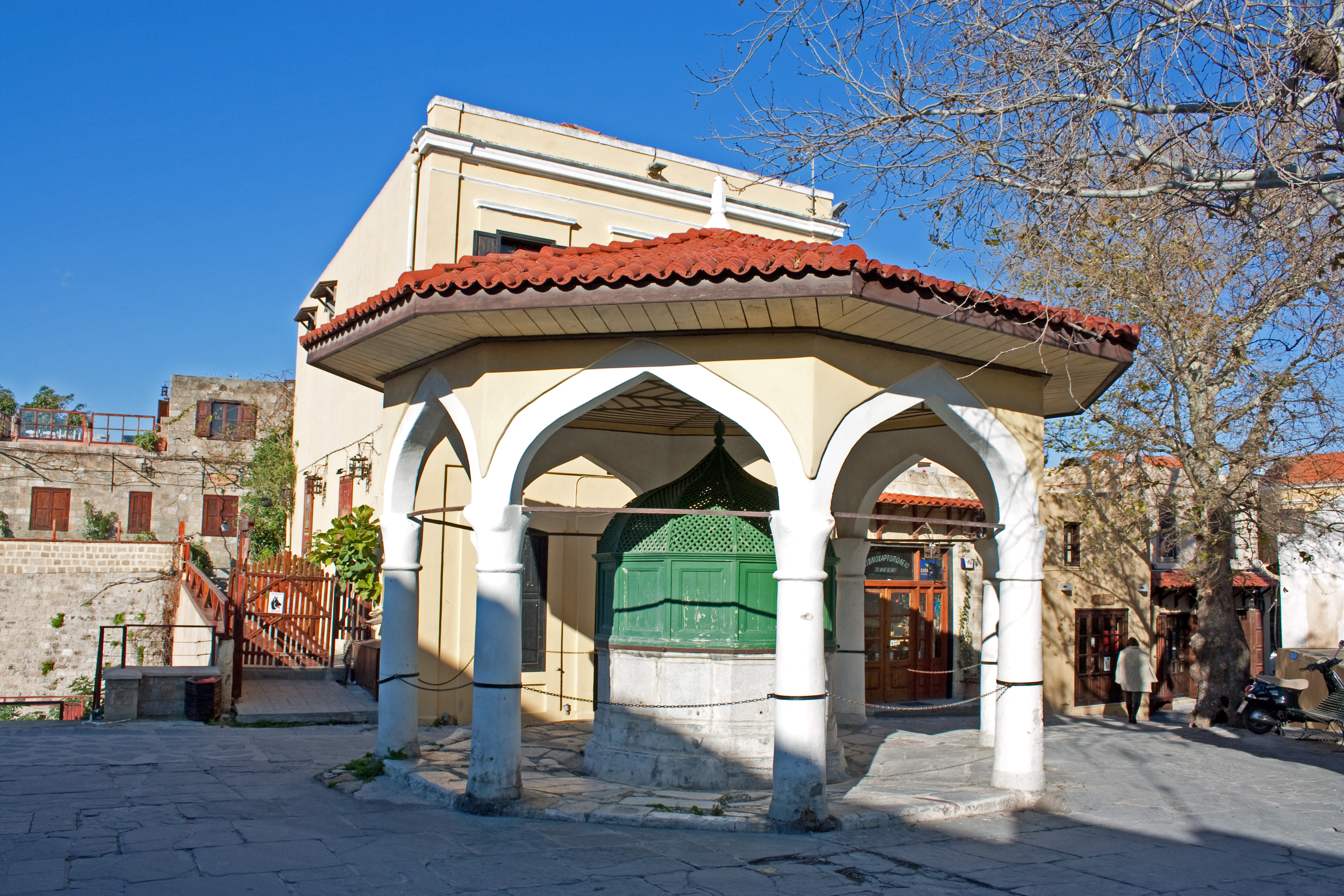
The fountain

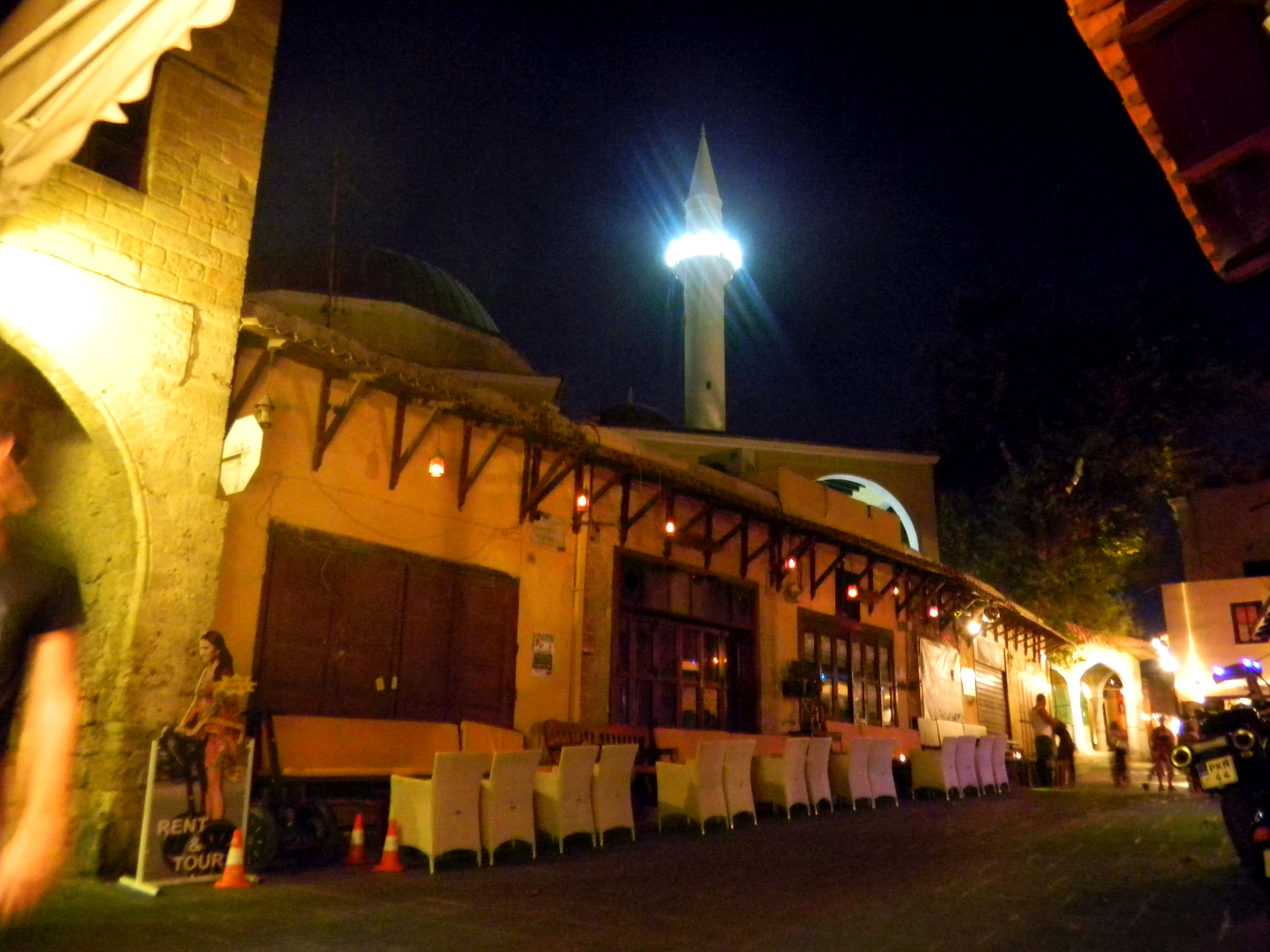
View at night

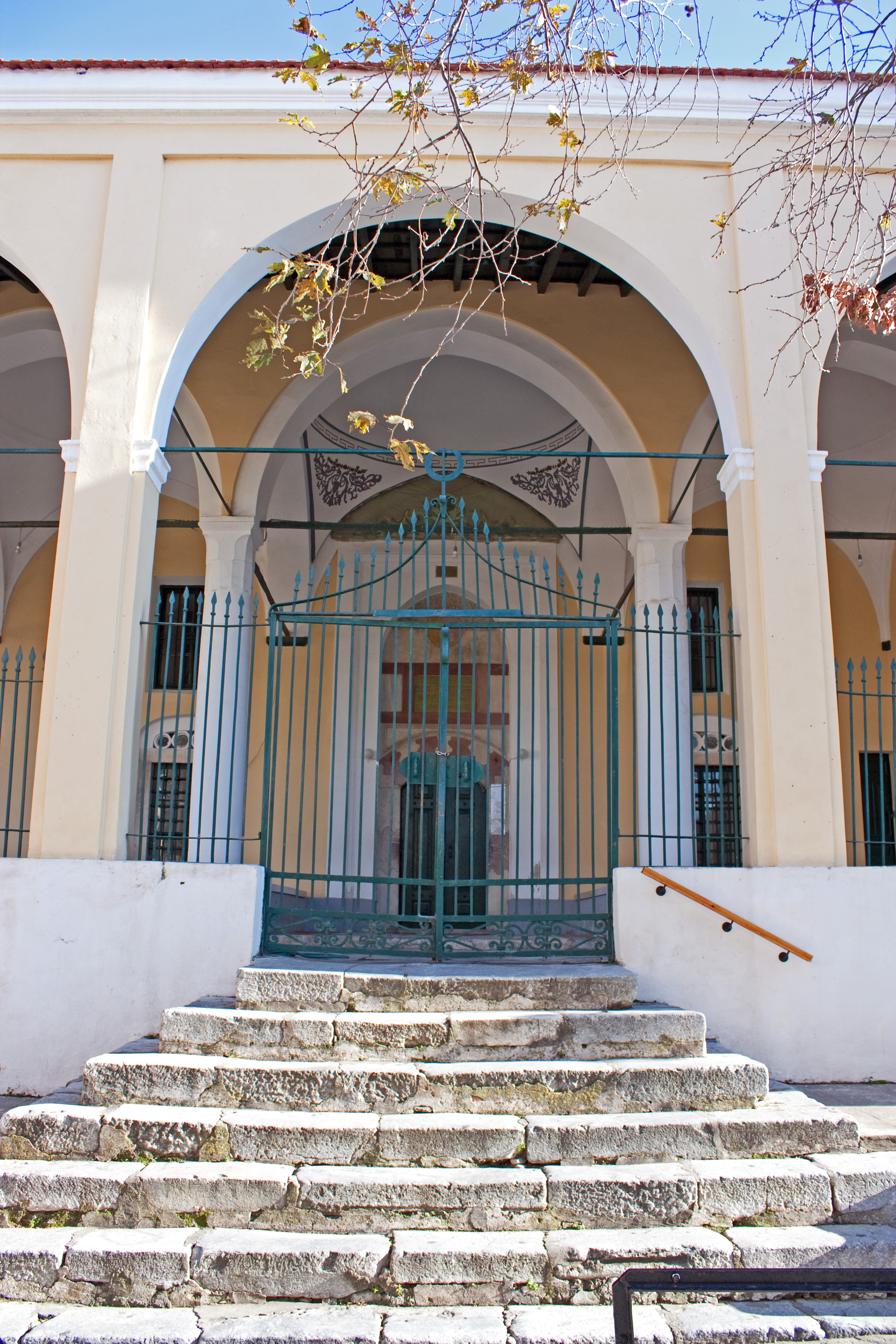
The entrance door

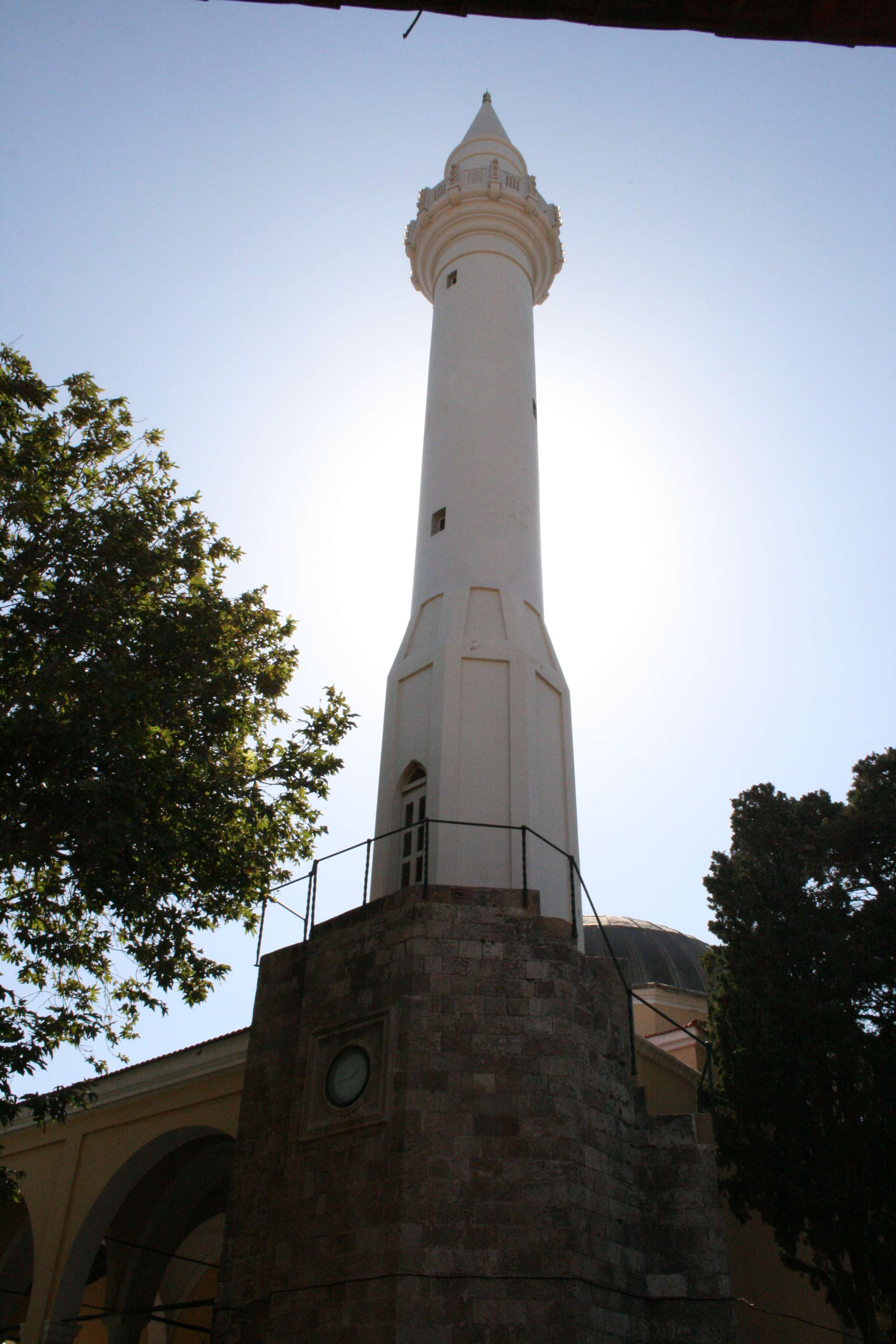
The minaret

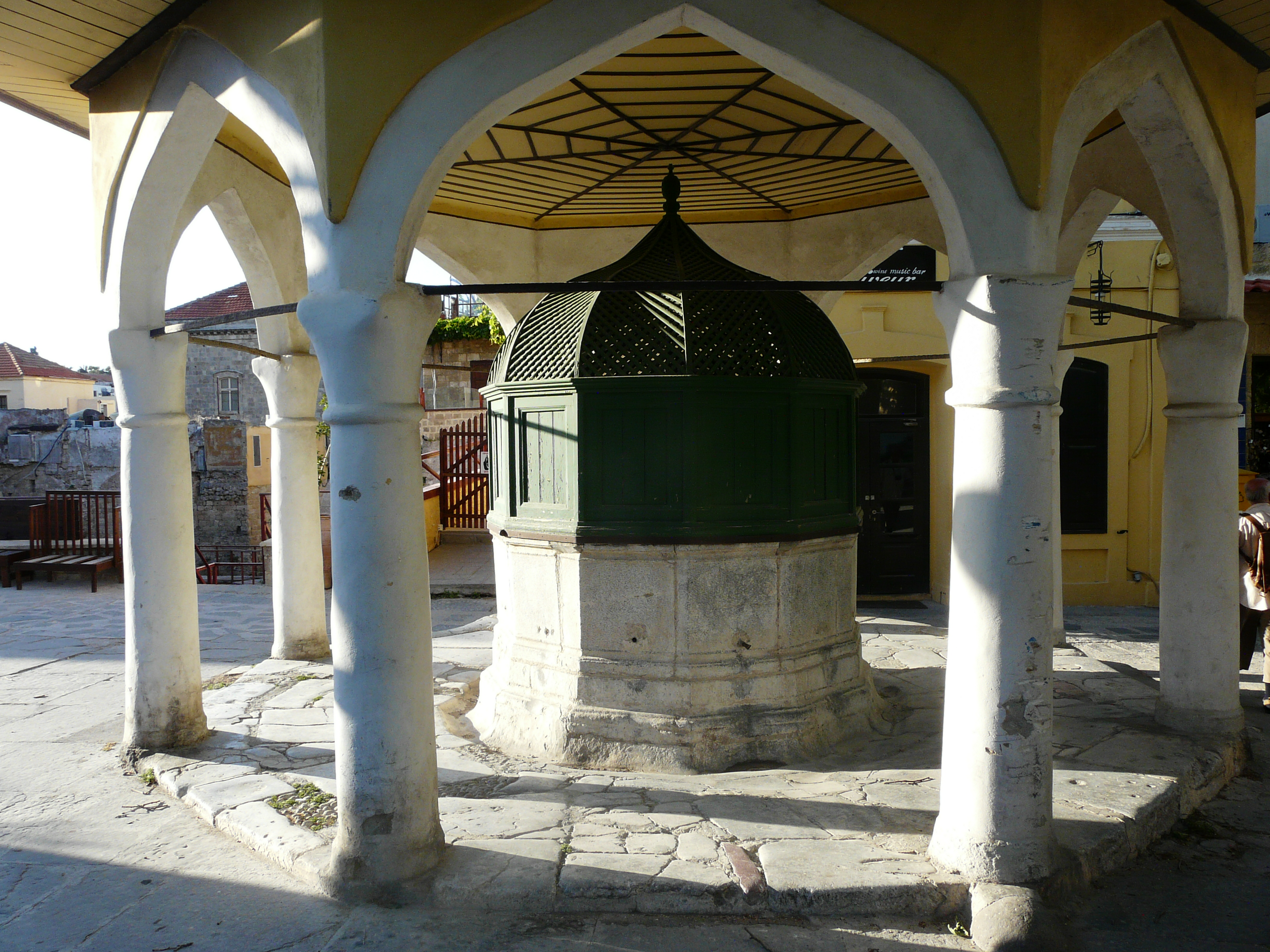
Fountain

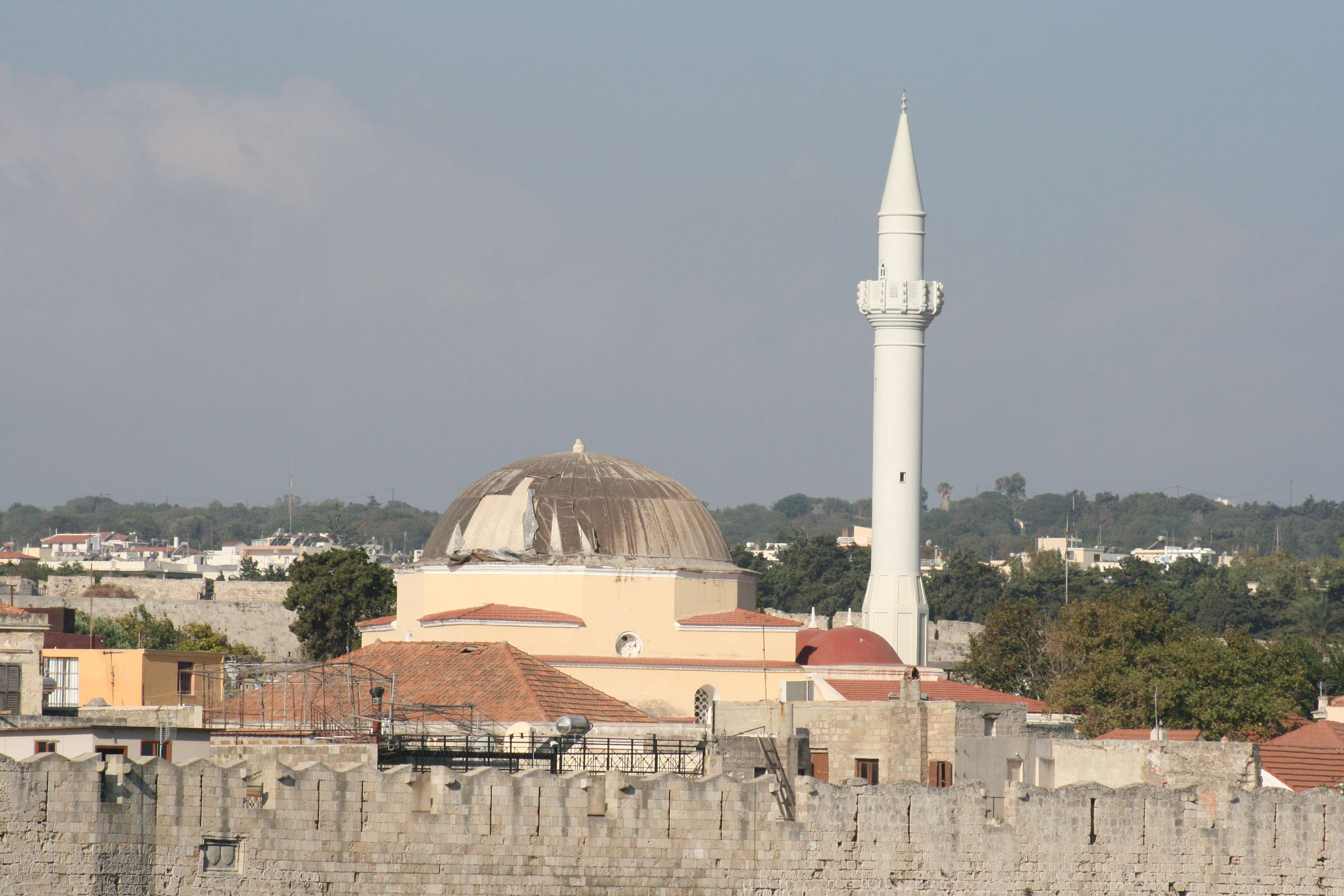
Exterior view

== See also ==
- Islam in Greece
- List of mosques in Greece
