= Gazi Hasan Pasha Mosque, Loggia =

Former mosque in Kos, Greece

Gazi Hasan Pasha Mosque
- Γαζί Χασάν Πασά Τζαμί
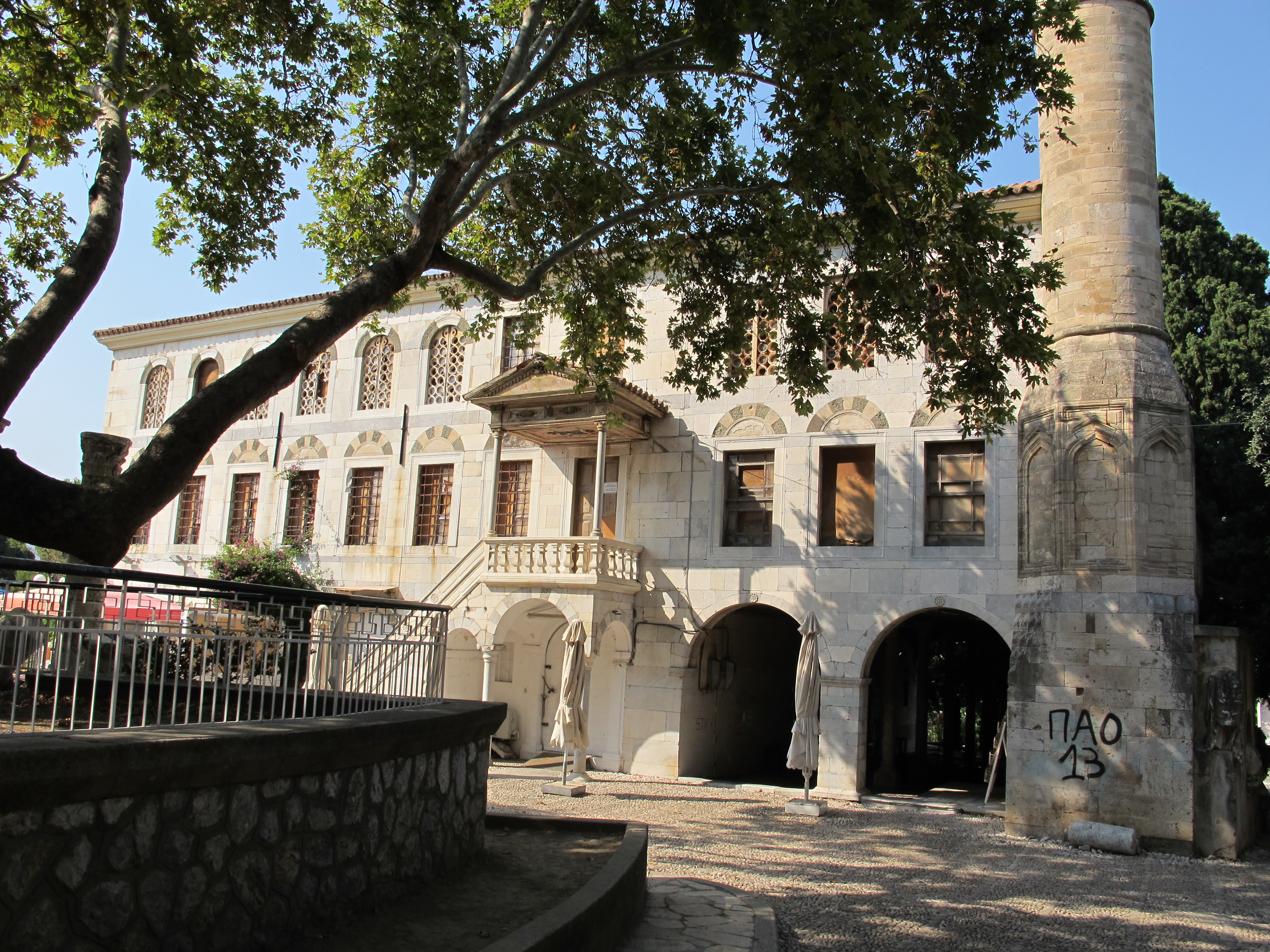
- The former mosque, in 2013

- Location of the former mosque in Greece

Religion
- Affiliation: Islam (former)
- Ecclesiastical or organizational status: Mosque (18th century–1820s)
- Status: Abandoned (as a mosque)

Location
- Location: Kos, South Aegean
- Country: Greece
- Interactive map of Gazi Hasan Pasha Mosque
- Coordinates: 36°53′40″N 27°17′26.8″E

Architecture
- Type: Mosque
- Style: Ottoman
- Founder: Gazi Hasan Pasha
- Completed: c. 1777 or 1786

Specifications
- Length: 23 m (75 ft)
- Width: 17 m (56 ft)
- Minaret: 1
- Materials: Stone; marble; tiles

The Gazi Hasan Pasha Mosque (Greek: Γαζί Χασάν Πασά Τζαμί; Turkish: Gazi Hasan Paşa Camii), referred to locally as the Loggia Mosque (Greek: Τζαμί της Λότζιας, Turkish: Lonca Camii), is a former mosque, located in the town and island of Kos, in the South Aegean region of Greece. Completed in c. 1777 or 1786, during the Ottoman era, the former mosque is longer open for worship. The former mosque is situated next to the legendary Tree of Hippocrates.

== History ==
The mosque was sponsored by Gazi Hasan Pasha, who served as admiral and Grand Vizier of the Ottoman Empire in the eighteenth century, who also funded the Gazi Hasan Pasha Mosque in Platani, hence their shared name. And old description reads that Gazi Hasan Pasha built the mosque in 1786. Its construction date has also been given as 1776-1777 instead, almost a decade earlier.

According to a local tradition the Gazi Hasan Pasha Mosque was originally a church dedicated to Saint George. As the mosque lies only a few yards away from the basilica, it is probable that this early Christian monument was also dedicated to the same saint.

The minaret and fountain were both damaged in the 2017 Aegean Sea earthquake that hit Kos, leaving both in need of restoration; the main building also remains awaiting a large-scale restoration campaign.

== Architecture ==
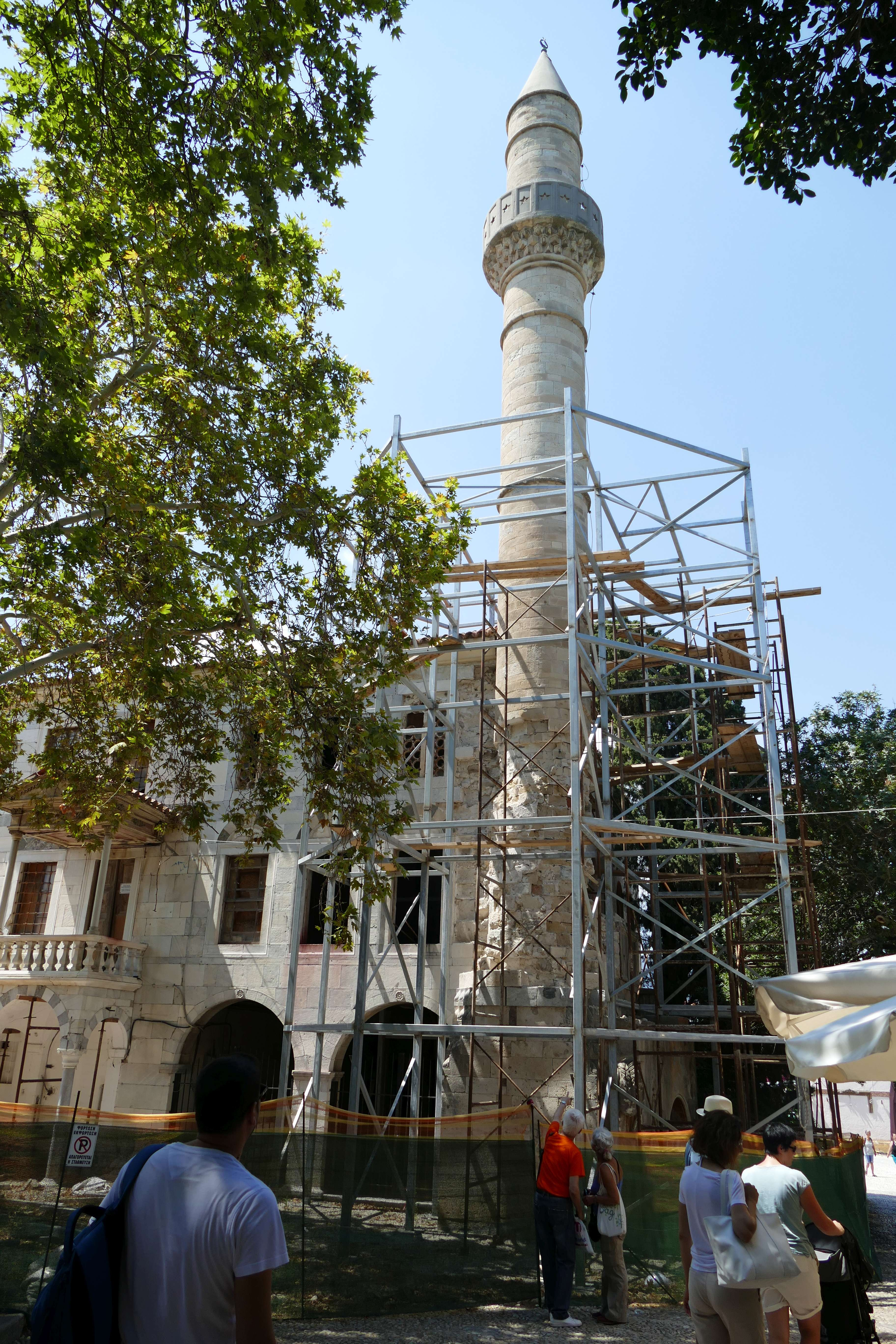
Minaret in renovation

For the mosque's construction materials such as marble and stones were taken from the ruins of a three-aisled basilica that was located in the port, as well as from the Baptistry of Saint John called 'the Seven Steps.'

Its dimensions measure 23 by 17 metres (75 by 56 ft) and it has a cubic shape, with two storeys. The large floor plan is rectangular in shape and has a square, tiled roof. All around it, except on its west side, large windows with arched finials are arranged in superimposed rows. Gazi Hasan Pasha is mainly built with ashlars of various shades and colours, as well as marble and reused ancient building material. In the north-west corner rises its tall, pencil-thin minaret.

The main room for prayer is on the first floor. It has two entrances leading to it, one on the north side via an external marble staircase with a two-pitched tiled canopy, which has a pediment that is supported by two thin columns. To the west of the prayer hall stands the narthex. A door connects these two spaces, which is decorated with a monumental marble doorway and flanked by two semi-columns. On the drum of the arch a verse from the Qur'an is quoted on a carved marble inscription.

The mihrab and the prayer niche, at the top of which a passage from the Qur'an is quoted, are found in the center of the eastern wall. Both made of white marble, they are a bit elevated compared to the rest of the hall and elaborately decorated with geometric and floral motifs. In the western wall a wooden elevated gyneconite (the women's quarters) can be found.

There are several painted decorations, most of which are depiction of columns with capitals between the windows of the upper row; they support the ceiling and rest on pessaries. The ground floor mostly resembles the layout of the first floor, however in place of the narthex there is a portico instead which is supported by five thin, marble columns. The rest of the ground floor sees eight narrow oblong spaces that once were utilised as cells to accommodate the populace, but later they found new usage as storage spaces.

The mosque is accompanied by a fourteen-sided fountain that stands to the north of the main building, made of white marble and ancient materials, and covered with a dome that is supported by seven arches and columns.

In modern times, the mosque stands in a relatively good condition, although it is still in need of some renovation, as it shows natural wear and the wooden materials had corroded, as have some of the sturdier, stone structures, like the ones that used porolite. Its roof was reconstructed in 1996.

== Gallery ==
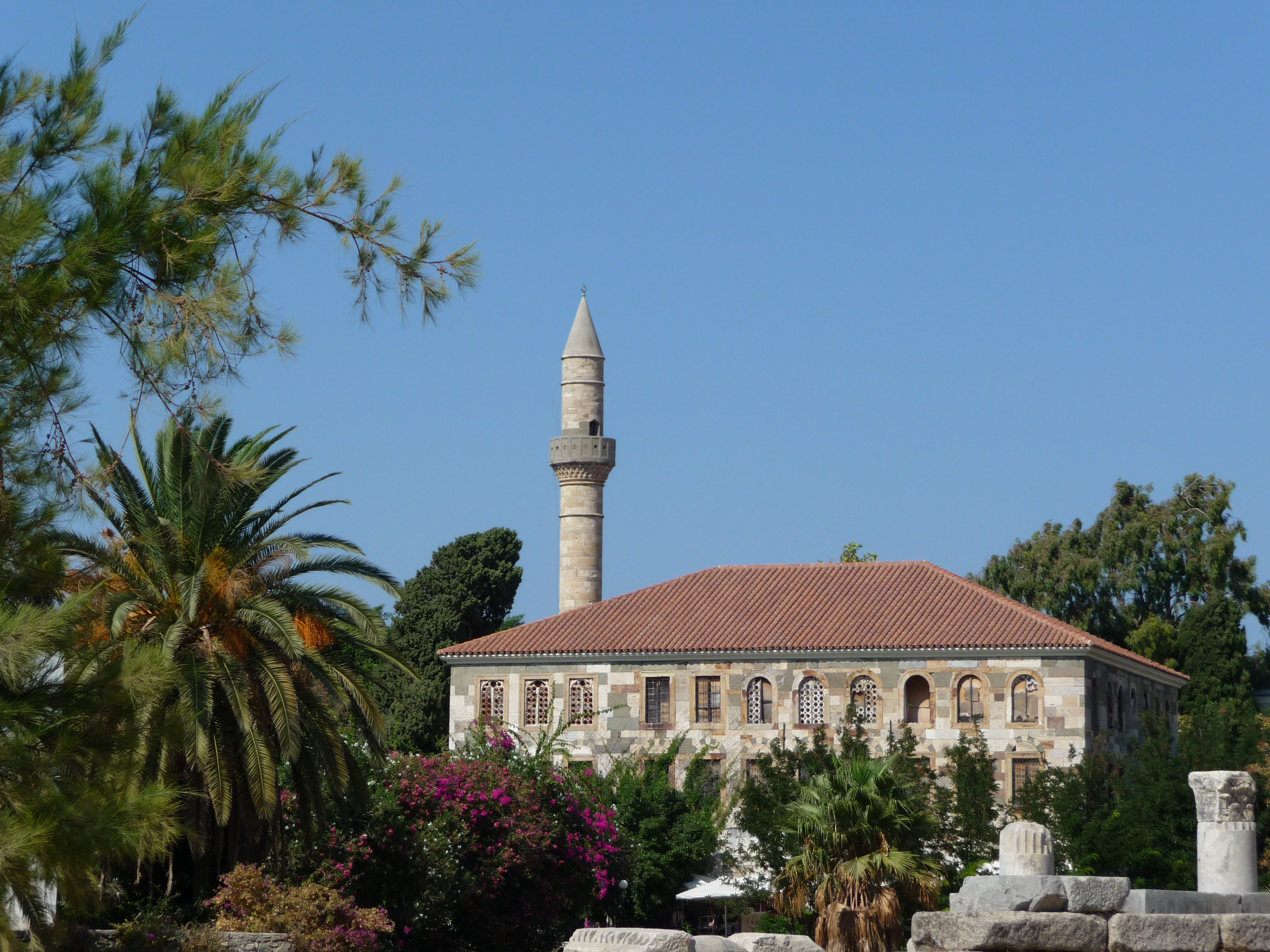
Wide view

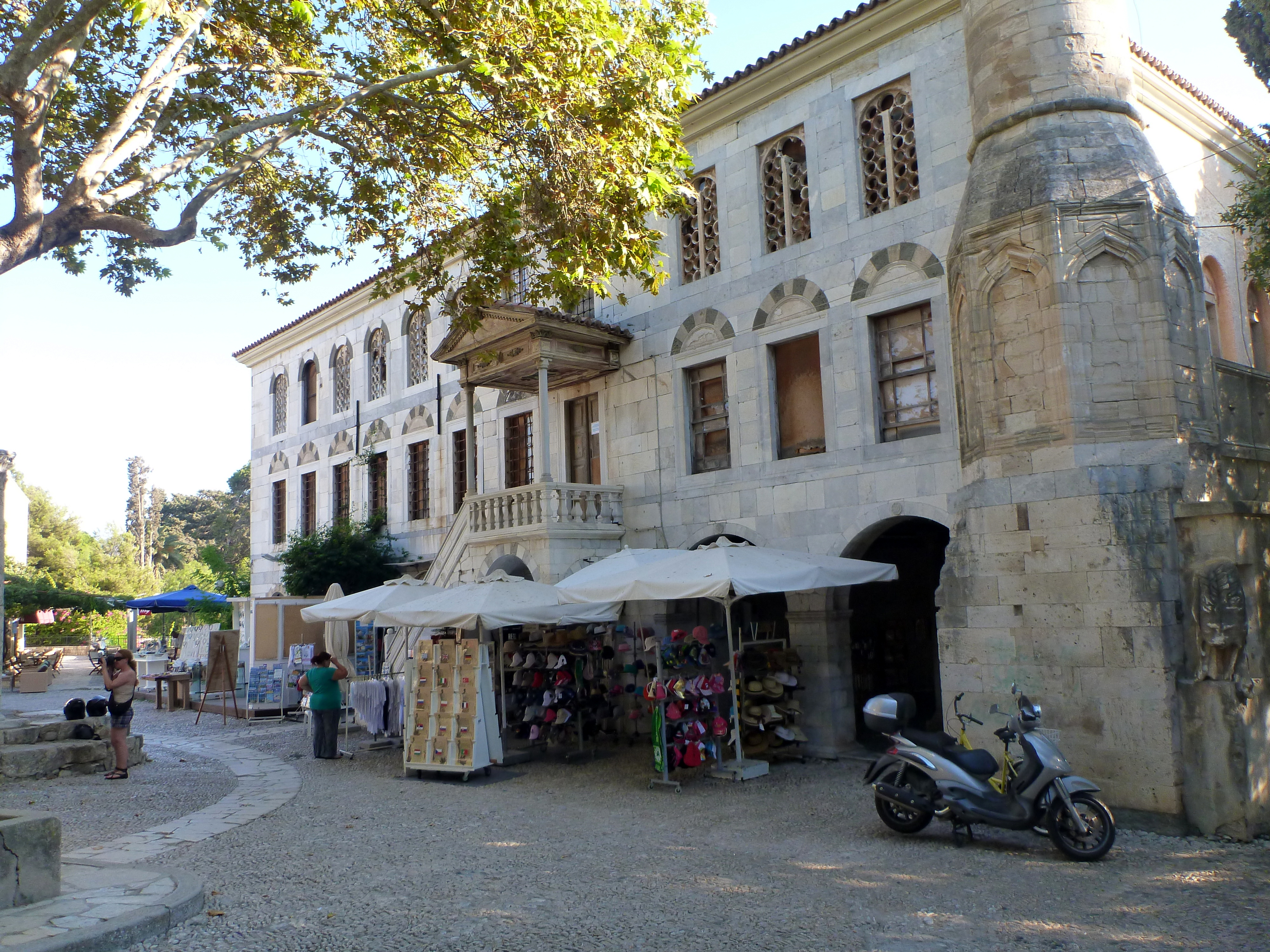
Panorama

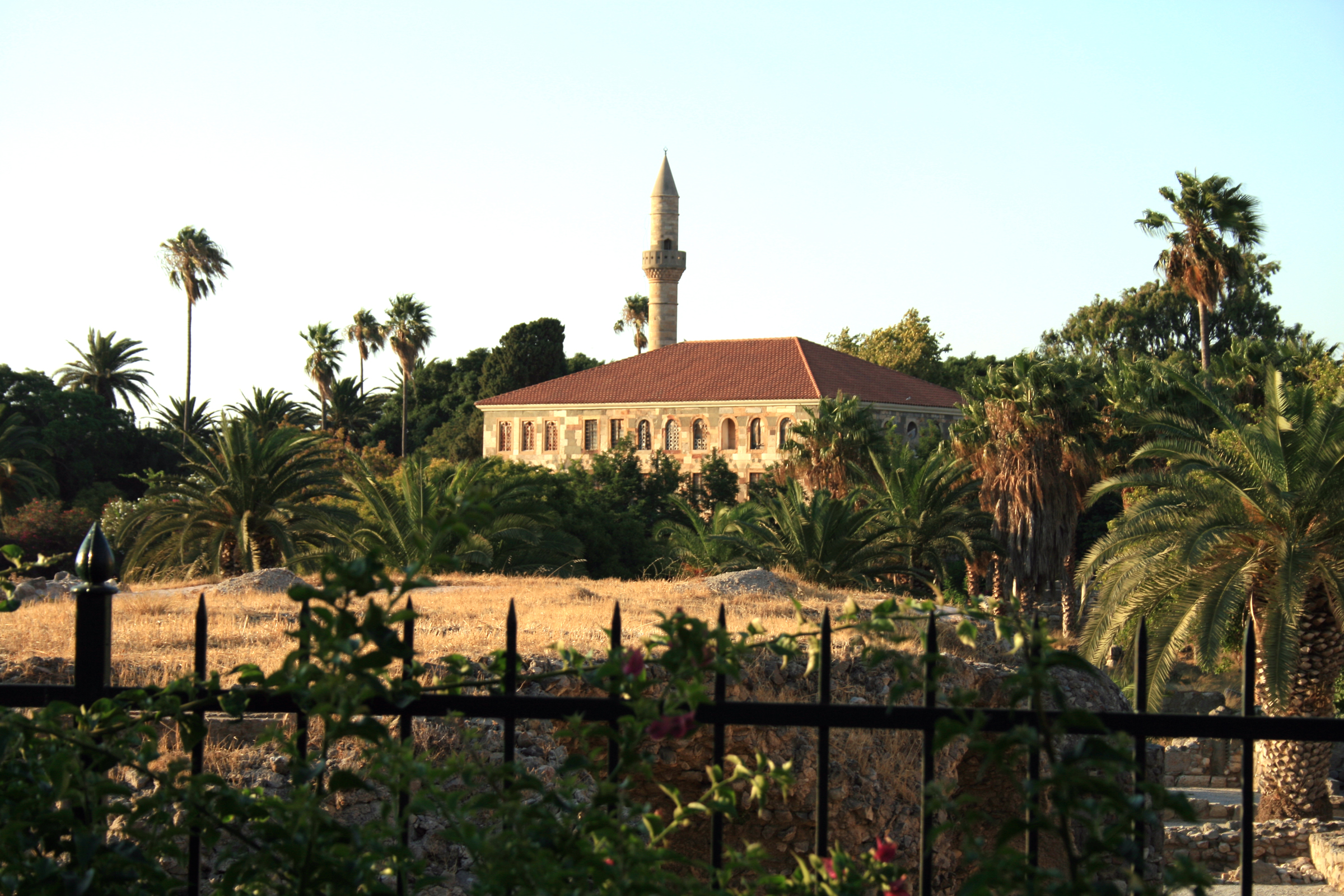
View from afar

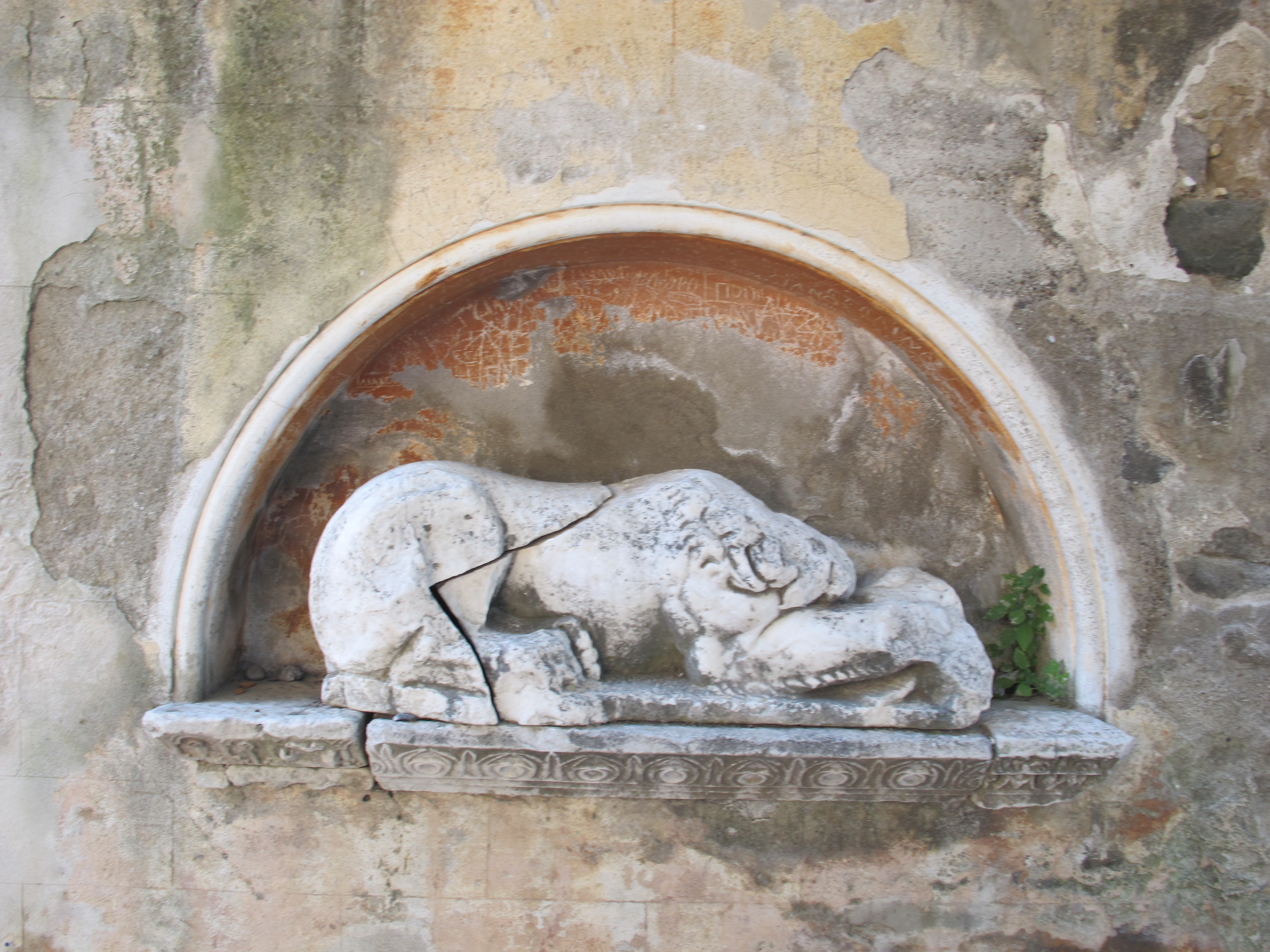
Statue of a lion

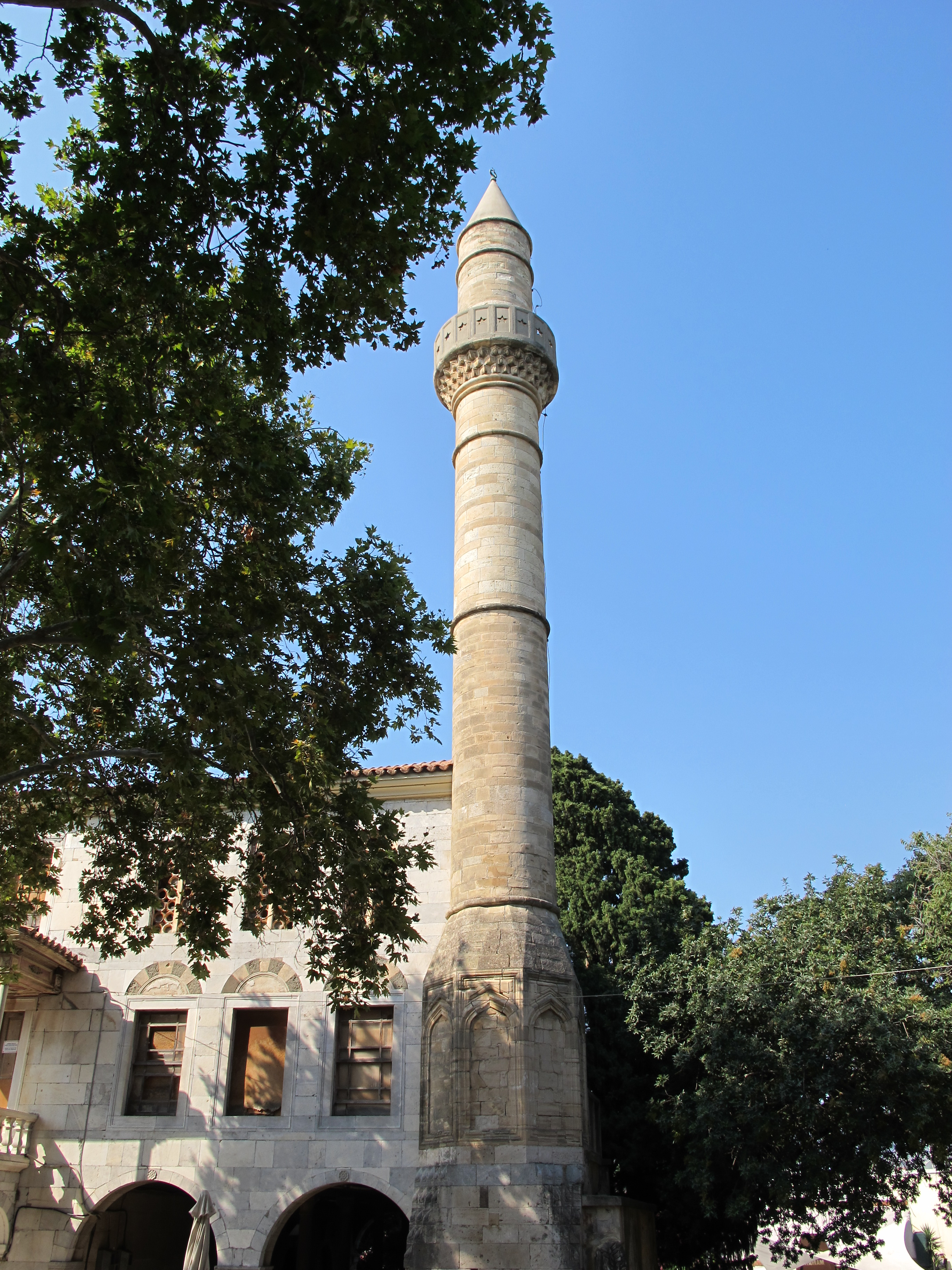
The minaret

== See also ==
- Islam in Greece
- List of former mosques in Greece
- Ottoman Greece
