= List of mosques in Greece =

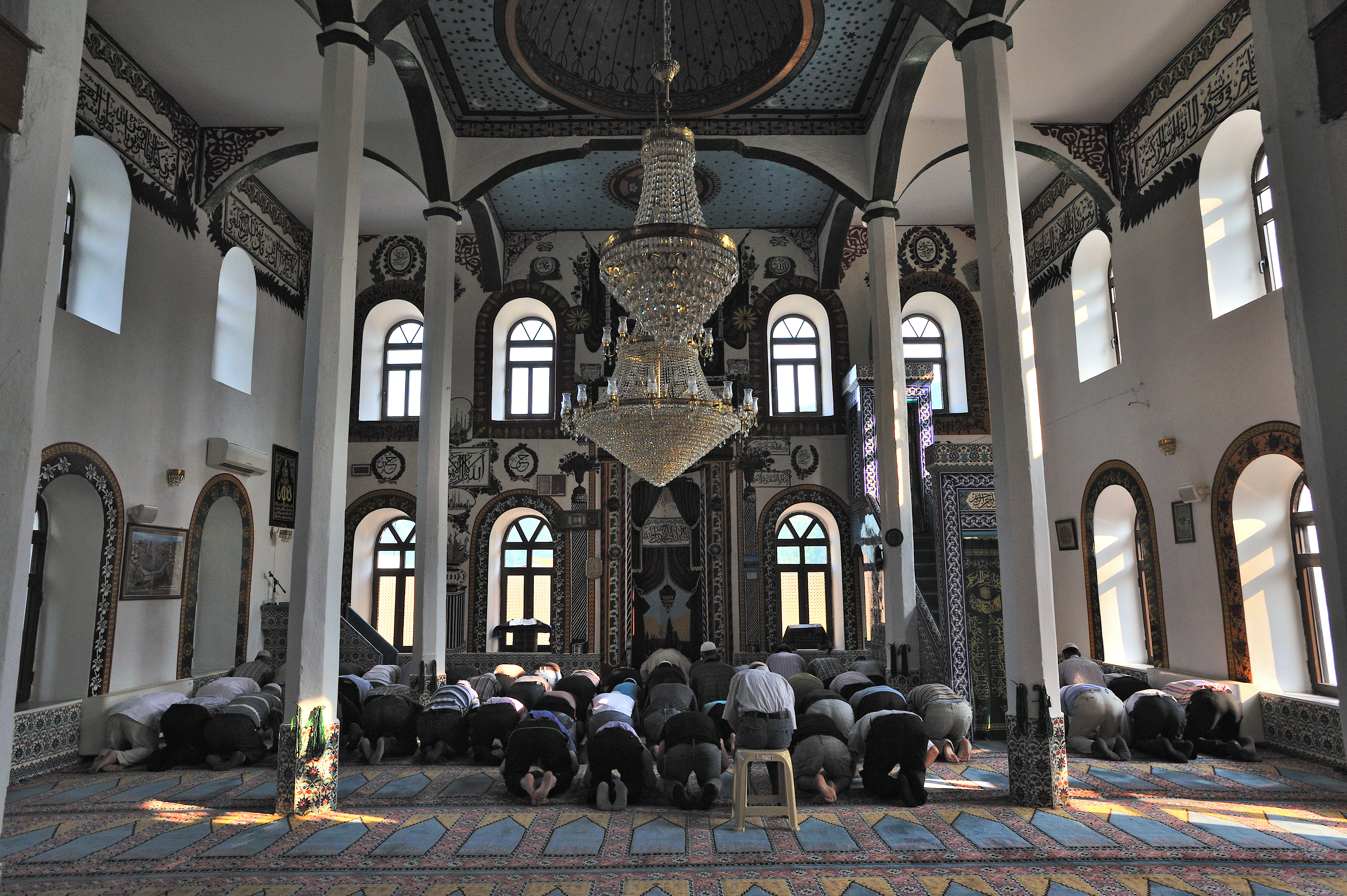
Interior of the Green Mosque of Echinos in Xanthi prefecture.

This is a list of mosques in Greece, sorted by geographic region that are open and functioning as mosques (Arabic: مَسْجِد, romanized: masjid, Greek: τζαμί, romanized: tzamí, Turkish: cami) and places of worship for Muslims in Greece.

For buildings that may have previously functioned as mosques and are either still standing and no longer used for worship, or are no longer extant, see the list of former mosques in Greece.

Construction of mosques in Greece has been documented since the period of the Ottoman Empire in Greece. Most of the mosques listed were built in the late 14th to early 20th centuries, when parts of modern Greece were part of the Ottoman Empire. Later several Christian churches throughout Greece were also converted into mosques after the Ottoman conquest, like the Hagios Demetrios church in Thessaloniki. Although gradually Hagios Demetrios was converted back into a church after Greek independence and the annexation of other territories.

== Mosques in current use ==
=== Attica and Central Greece ===
List of active mosques in Attica that encompasses the entire metropolitan area of Athens, and the rest of Central Greece which encompasses Attica.

Name	Image	Location	Year (CE)	Remarks
Votanikos Mosque		Athens	2020	First purpose-built mosque in Athens after Greek Independence, fully-funded by the Greek government

=== Central Macedonia ===
List of active mosques in Central Macedonia administrative region.

Name	Image	Location	Year (CE)	Remarks
Yeni Mosque		Thessaloniki	1902	Built by Vitaliano Poselli. Ceased use in 1923 and, after the population exchange between Greece and Turkey, it was repurposed for the Archaeological Museum of Thessaloniki and then as an exhibition center. It was re-opened for worship for major Islamic festivals in 2012 and again during the 2020s.

=== Eastern Macedonia and Thrace ===
List of active mosques in Eastern Macedonia and Thrace administrative region.

Name	Image	Location	Year (CE)	Remarks
Yeni Mosque		Komotini	1585	Completed during the Ottoman era, it is the only surviving structure in Greece to feature Iznik tiles from the 1580s, the zenith of the Iznik potters' art.
Eski Mosque		Komotini	1608	Completed during the Ottoman era, the building has been variously used as a mosque, a church, and returned to use as a mosque since 1920, rebuilt with two minarets.
Kayali Mosque		Komotini	1730	Part of the larger Hayriyye Madrasa (Islamic school) complex, which is still operational to this day.
Achrian Mosque		Xanthi	16th century	Rebuilt in 1850 after the 1829 earthquakes, it's a single-hall stone building with a surviving minaret and an adjoining cemetery with graves from 1580–1896.
Alaca Mosque		Didymoteicho	1753	One of the two surviving mosques in Didymoteicho (out of twelve) and the only one still in use. Also called the Market Mosque, Small Mosque and Sadirvan Mosque.
Alexandroupolis Mosque		Alexandroupolis	1906	Completed during the Ottoman era, the building is made of stone, bricks, and marble, with elaborate decoration and a multitude of engraved inscriptions; a minaret is on the western side of the mosque.
Green Mosque		Echinos		One of the three mosques in Echinos, a Pomak village.
Karaca Ahmet Mosque		Echinos	1960s	Built in the 1960s on the site of an old tekke and türbe of a man named Karaca Ahmet, who supposedly along with his sister Karaca Ayse visited Echinos and was offered hospitality by the locals. Today the old tekke and türbe are inside the mosque.

=== North and South Aegean ===
List of active mosques located in the Aegean Islands, the group of islands in the Aegean Sea between mainland Greece and Turkey, split between the North Aegean and South Aegean administrative regions.

Name	Image	Location	Year (CE)	Remarks
Ibrahim Pasha Mosque		Rhodes	1540	Completed during the Ottoman era, the mosque is the only operational mosque in Rhodes of the twelve mosques from the Ottoman era
Gazi Hasan Pasha Mosque		Platani	1778	Completed during the Ottoman era, the mosque is one of two operational mosques of the five mosques on the island of Kos.
Defterdar Mosque	Kos DeMos 01	Kos	18th century	Completed during the Ottoman era, the mosque is one of two operational mosques of the five mosques on the island of Kos.

== See also ==
- Islam in Greece
- List of former mosques in Greece
- Greek Muslims
- Lists of mosques

== Sources ==
- Canard, M. (1971). "Iḳrīṭis̲h̲". In Lewis, B.; Ménage, V. L.; Pellat, Ch. & Schacht, J. (eds.). The Encyclopaedia of Islam, Second Edition. Volume III: H–Iram. Leiden: E. J. Brill. pp. 1082–1086. OCLC 495469525.
- Kazhdan, Alexander (1991). "Anemas". In Kazhdan, Alexander (ed.). The Oxford Dictionary of Byzantium. Oxford and New York: Oxford University Press. p. 96. ISBN 0-19-504652-8.
- Konuk, Neval (2008). Ottoman architecture in Lesvos, Rhodes, Chios and Kos islands. Ankara: The Center for Strategic Research. ISBN 978-9757307693.
- Papadopoulos, Alex; Petridis, Triantaphyllos (2021). Hellenic Statecraft and the Geopolitics of Difference. London: Routledge. ISBN 978-1-351-01869-2.
