= Alexandroupolis Mosque =

Ottoman mosque in Alexandroupolis, Greece

Alexandroupolis Mosque (Mosque of Aleandroupolis)
- Τζαμί Αλεξανδρούπολης
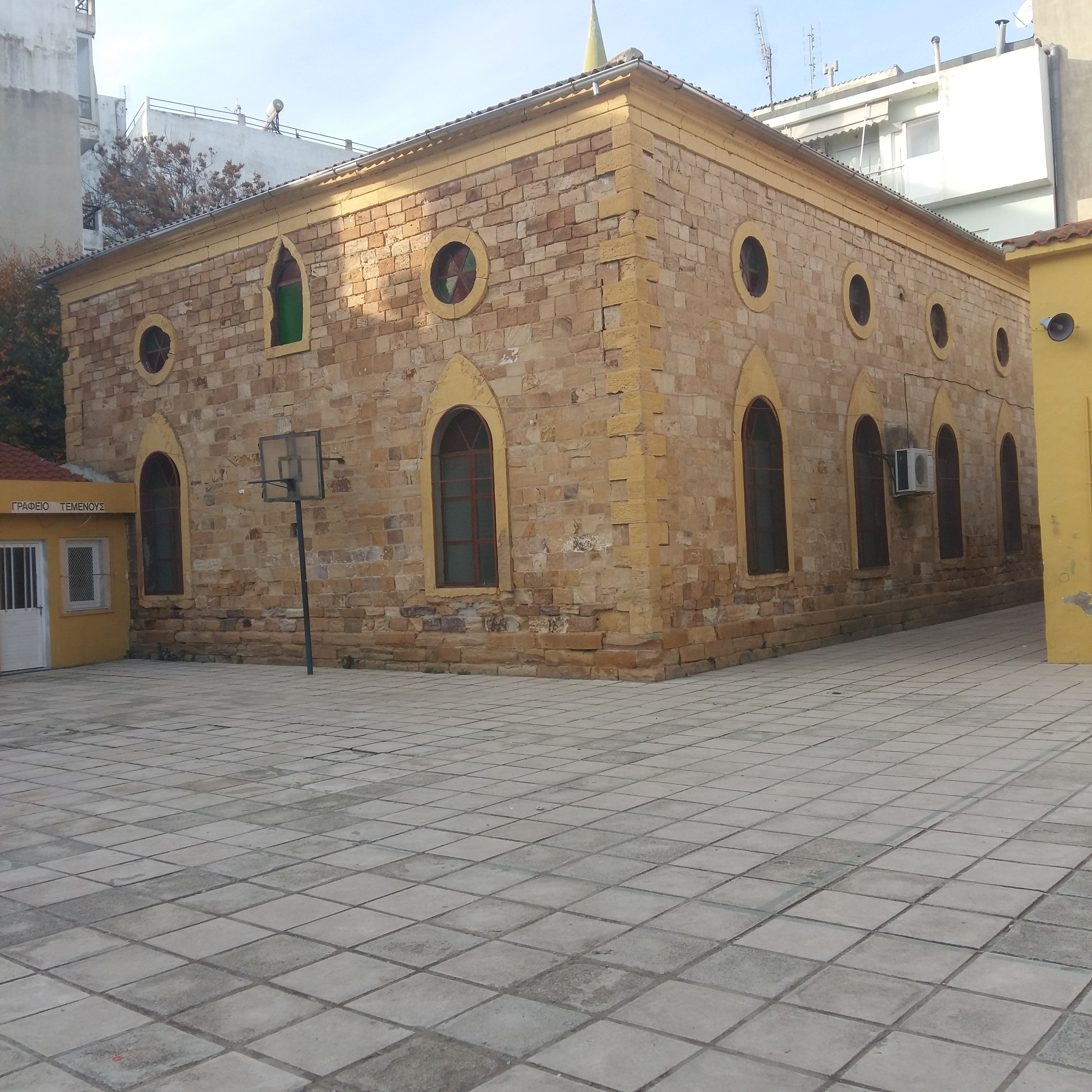
- The mosque in 2019

- Location within Greece

Religion
- Affiliation: Islam
- Ecclesiastical or organizational status: Mosque
- Status: Active

Location
- Location: Alexandroupolis, Evros, Eastern Macedonia and Thrace
- Country: Greece
- Interactive map of Alexandroupolis Mosque (Mosque of Aleandroupolis)
- Coordinates: 40°50′48.8″N 25°52′51.9″E

Architecture
- Type: Mosque
- Style: Ottoman
- Groundbreaking: 1895
- Completed: 1906

Specifications
- Minaret: 1
- Materials: Stone; brick; marble

The Alexandroupolis Mosque, also known as the Mosque of Alexandroupolis (Greek: Τζαμί Αλεξανδρούπολης; Turkish: Dedeağaç Camii), is a mosque on Kassandras Street, in the town of Alexandroupolis, in Evros, in the Eastern Macedonia and Thrace region of Greece. Completed in 1906 during the Ottoman era, the mosque serves the small Muslim community of the town.

== History ==
The mosque has stood for longer than Alexandroupolis has been a town, its construction dated from 1895. According to a plaque above its door, the mosque was opened in 1906. On its grounds originally stood a madrasa, but now just the mosque stands surrounded by other buildings.

It has suffered damage by arson twice during the 20th century, most recently in 1993, and each time its rebuilding was financed by the Greek government. The first was during the Bulgarian occupation of the town in the 1910s, and the second in 1993 by person or persons unknown.

The mosque, which is built next to a Muslim minority primary school, is still used regularly by the local Muslim community. The mosque has also been subjected to attacks by right-wing nationalists, the most recent of which occurred in 2014.

== Architecture ==
The Mosque of Alexandroupolis is a square room with a prayer hall. It has a marble structure, with elaborate decoration and a multitude of engraved inscriptions, which are considered a remarkable example of the sculptural marble art for its time. On the west side of the Muslim mosque stands the tomb of an Ottoman general, Fayek Hussein Pasha, which is also made of marble.

The minaret stands on the western side of the mosque.

== See also ==
- Islam in Greece
- List of mosques in Greece
- Ottoman Greece
