= Gazi Hasan Pasha Mosque =

Mosque in Kos, Greece

- Γαζί Χασάν Πασά Τζαμί
- Location of the mosque in Greece

Religion
- Affiliation: Islam
- Ecclesiastical or organizational status: Mosque
- Status: Active

Location
- Location: Kos, South Aegean
- Country: Greece
- Interactive map of Gazi Hasan Pasha Mosque
- Coordinates: 36°52′54″N 27°16′25″E

Architecture
- Type: Mosque
- Style: Ottoman
- Founder: Gazi Hasan Pasha
- Completed: 1778

Specifications
- Minaret: 1 (partially damaged)
- Materials: Stone

The Gazi Hasan Pasha Mosque (Greek: Γαζί Χασάν Πασά Τζαμί; Turkish: Gazi Hasan Paşa Camii) is a mosque on the island of Kos, in the South Aegean region of Greece. Completed in the 18th century, during the Ottoman era, the mosque serves the Muslim-Turkish community of Kos, as one of the two out of the five Ottoman mosques to be still operational and open for prayers on the island, the other being the Defterdar Mosque. It is also one of the two mosques in Kos to be named in honour of Gazi Hasan Pasha, the other being the one in Kos town.

== History ==
The mosque was built in 1778 or in between 1784 and 1785, in the village of Platani in Kos by the Algerian Gazi Hasan Pasha, likely on the site of a previous building. The mosque, particularly its minaret, was heavily damaged by the 1933 earthquake, and was thereafter repaired by the Italians, who held Kos at the time. It was further damaged during the 2017 Aegean Sea earthquake, whereupon plans for extensive restoration were announced.

== Structure ==
Following the usual Ottoman architectural style, the narthex and the mihrab are found on the ground floor, while on the upper floor contains the women's cloister, accessible by a staircase. There is a marble fountain in the courtyard area, which was used to grind wheat.

== See also ==
- Islam in Greece
- List of mosques in Greece
- Ottoman Greece
