= Tree of Hippocrates =

Tree in Kos associated with Hippocrates

Coordinates: 36°53′41″N 27°17′27″E

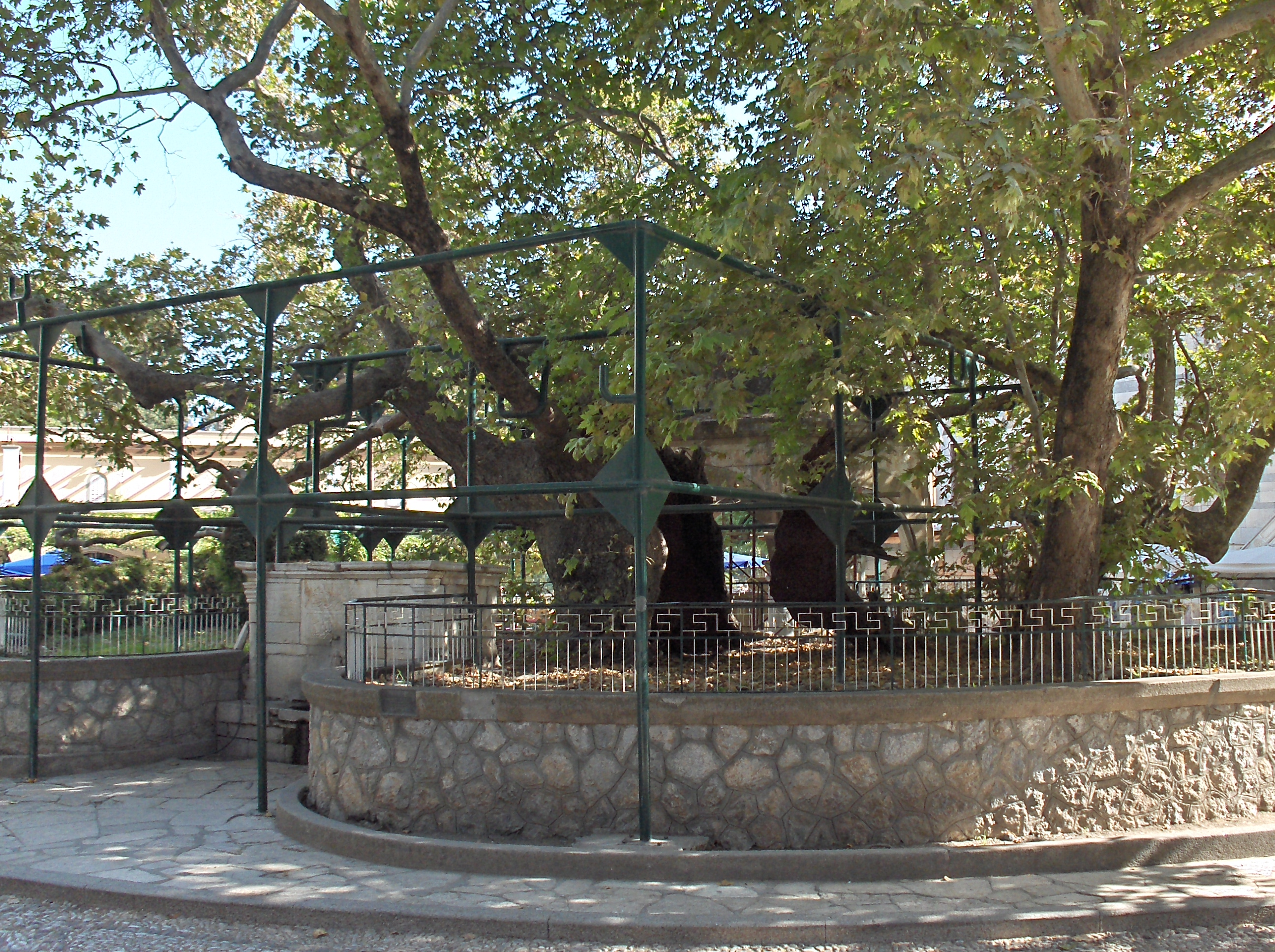
The celebrated "Tree of Hippocrates", an oriental plane tree in Kos, Greece.

The Tree of Hippocrates is the plane tree (or platane, in Europe) under which, according to legend, Hippocrates of Kos (considered the father of medicine) taught his pupils the art of medicine. Paul of Tarsus purportedly taught here as well. The Platanus in Kos is an oriental plane (Platanus orientalis), with a crown diameter of about 12 m (39 ft), said to be the largest for a plane tree in Europe.

Hippocrates' tree resides on the Platía Platanou (or "Square of the Platane"), in front of the Castle of Knights and next to the Gazi Hassan Mosque (erected in 1776) in the centre of Kos town. The current tree is only about 500 years old, but may possibly be a descendant of the original tree which allegedly stood there 2400 years ago, in Hippocrates' time. The tree has become hollowed out over the years, and some branches are supported by metal scaffolding. Next to the tree is a white tap with engravings in the Arabic language, also built by the Turkish Governor Gazi Hassan.

== Derivatives of the original tree ==
The Medical Association of Cos presented a gavel made from wood of the plane tree to the President of the Canadian Medical Association in 1954.

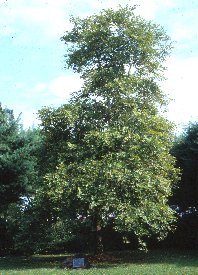
Tree of Hippocrates at the United States National Library of Medicine

Seeds or cuttings from the tree have been spread all over the world. A cutting of the tree was presented as a gift from the island of Kos to the United States and the National Library of Medicine, and planted on December 14, 1961 on the grounds surrounding the library. Many medical colleges, libraries or institutions have, or claim to have, trees cut or seeded from the original tree in Kos.

Trees cut or seeded from the original tree can be found, among others:
North America:

- The American College of Physicians have a mace with a wooden shaft made from a branch of a plane tree from the island of Kos.
- A cutting was planted on the campus of the University of Alabama at Birmingham to accompany a commissioned marble statue of Hippocrates. The 1971 installation was a gift from the Nakos Foundation to the University's medical center.
- The Canadian Medical Association obtained a cutting in 1969, which was planted in Walker County, Alabama in 1981.
- at The Warren Alpert Medical School of Brown University, Providence, RI
- at The Brody School of Medicine, East Carolina University
- at Mercer University School of Medicine
- at the Uniformed Services University of the Health Sciences in Bethesda, Maryland
- at the University of Michigan Medical School
- at the University of South Alabama College of Medicine
- at the University of Victoria
- at Yale University
- at the University of Florida J Hillis Miller Health Science Center, where College of Medicine students obtained cuttings in 1969 and which inspired the annual Hippocratic Award
- at the Francis A. Countway Library of Medicine, Harvard Medical School, Boston, Massachusetts
- at the West Virginia School of Medicine near the Library in Charleston, West Virginia
- at the Quillen College of Medicine, East Tennessee State University, Johnson City, Tennessee
- at MedStar Harbor Hospital, Baltimore, Maryland
- at New York Medical College / Westchester Medical Center, Valhalla, NY
- at the University of Texas Health Science Center at Houston Medical School
- adjacent to the University of Utah School of Medicine, where it is planted at the southwest corner of the Spencer S. Eccles Health Sciences Library

South America:

- at the University of São Paulo, Brazil
- at the Londrina State University, Brazil

Europe:

- at the University of Glasgow, Department of Medical Genetics
- at Queen's University Belfast Medical School, Northern Ireland
- at the University of Barcelona, Faculty of Medicine and Health Sciences
- at the Royal College of Physicians in London

Oceania:

- at University of Sydney's School of Rural Health in Dubbo, Australia.
- at Burwood Hospital, in Christchurch, New Zealand
- at Orange Health Service, Orange, Australia
- at Hawke's Bay Hospital in Hastings, New Zealand
- at Sir Charles Gairdner Hospital in Perth, Western Australia

Asia:

- in front of the Medical Library, Kyushu University, Fukuoka City (Japan). Donated by Dr. Hiroshi Kambara in 1973.

== Additional images ==
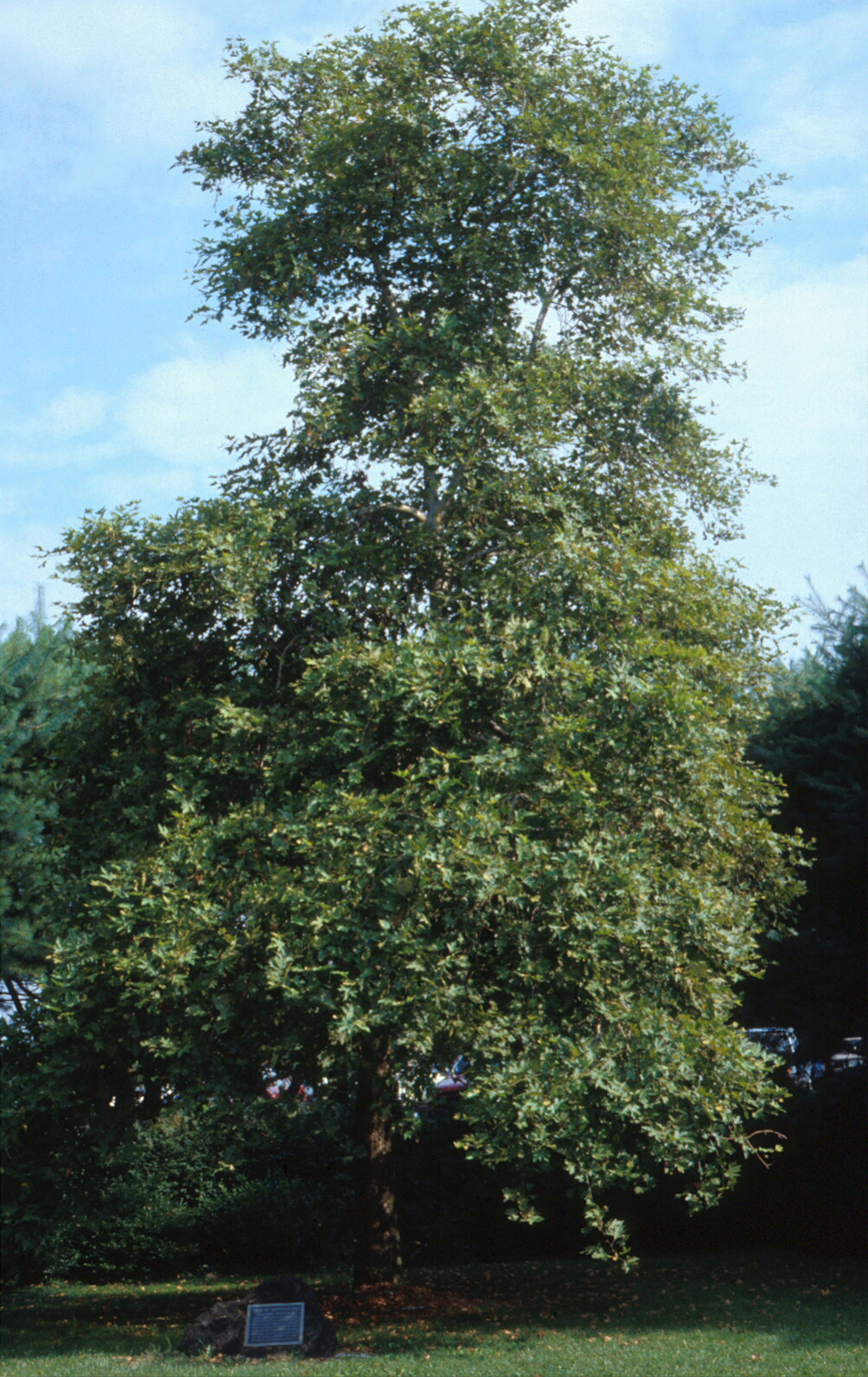
A gift from the Greek Dodecanese island of Kos, historic birthplace of Hippocrates, Father of Medicine, at the National Library of Medicine.

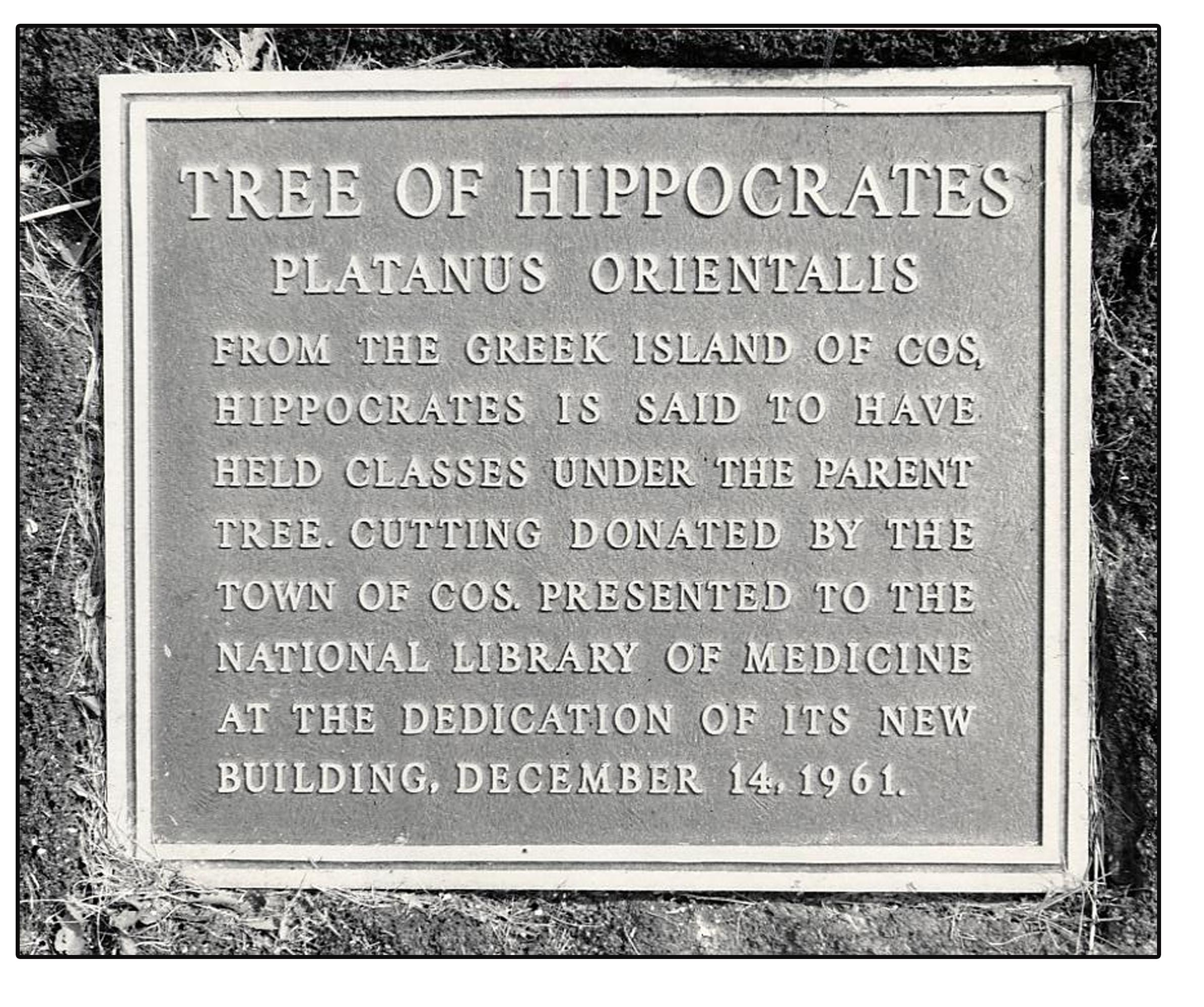
Plaque at base of Tree of Hippocrates at the National Library of Medicine.

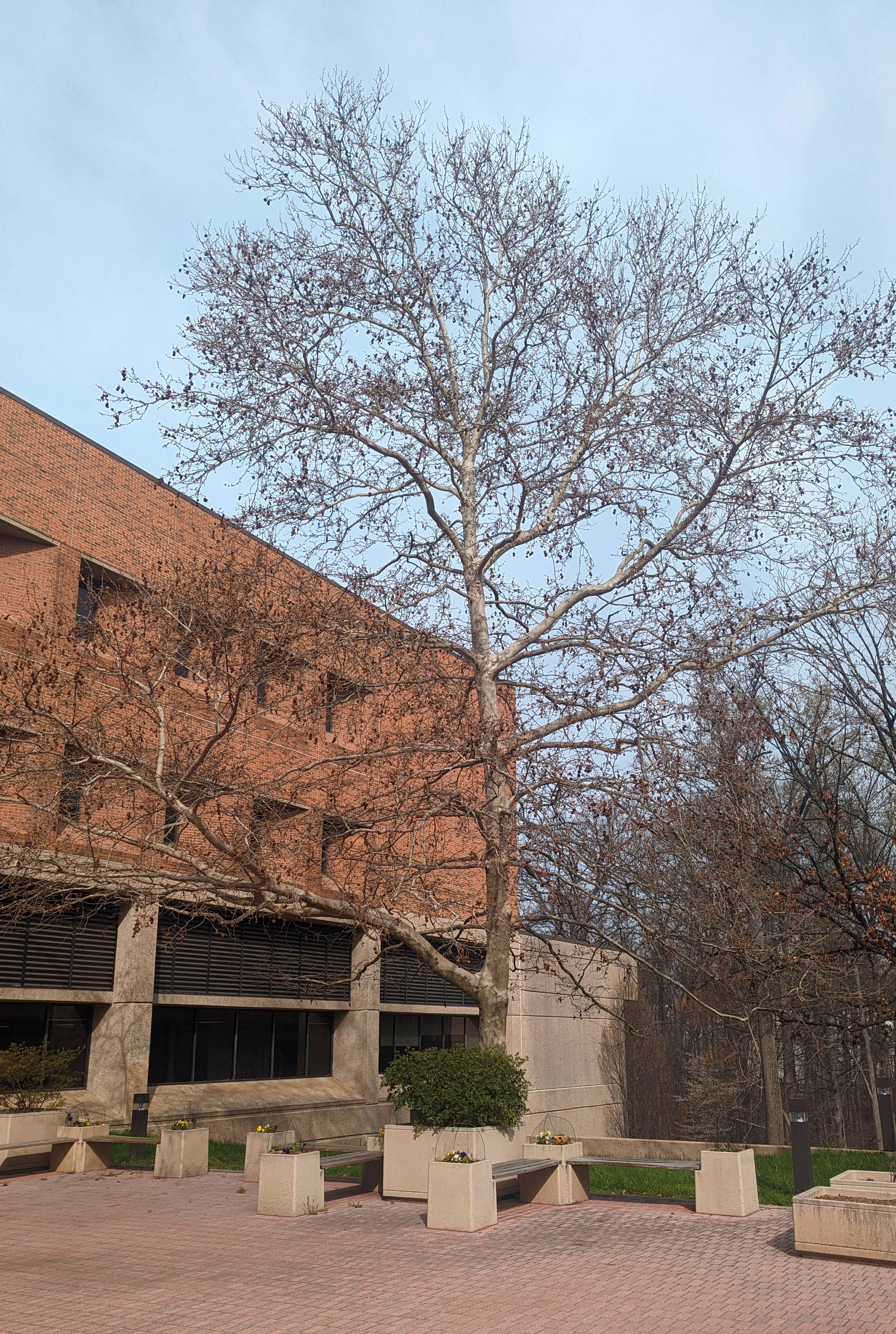
Tree of Hippocrates at Uniformed Services University of the Health Sciences in Bethesda, Maryland

== See also ==
- List of individual trees
