= Defterdar Mosque (Kos) =

Mosque in Kos, Greece

- Ντεφτερντάρ Ιμπραήμ Πασά Τζαμί
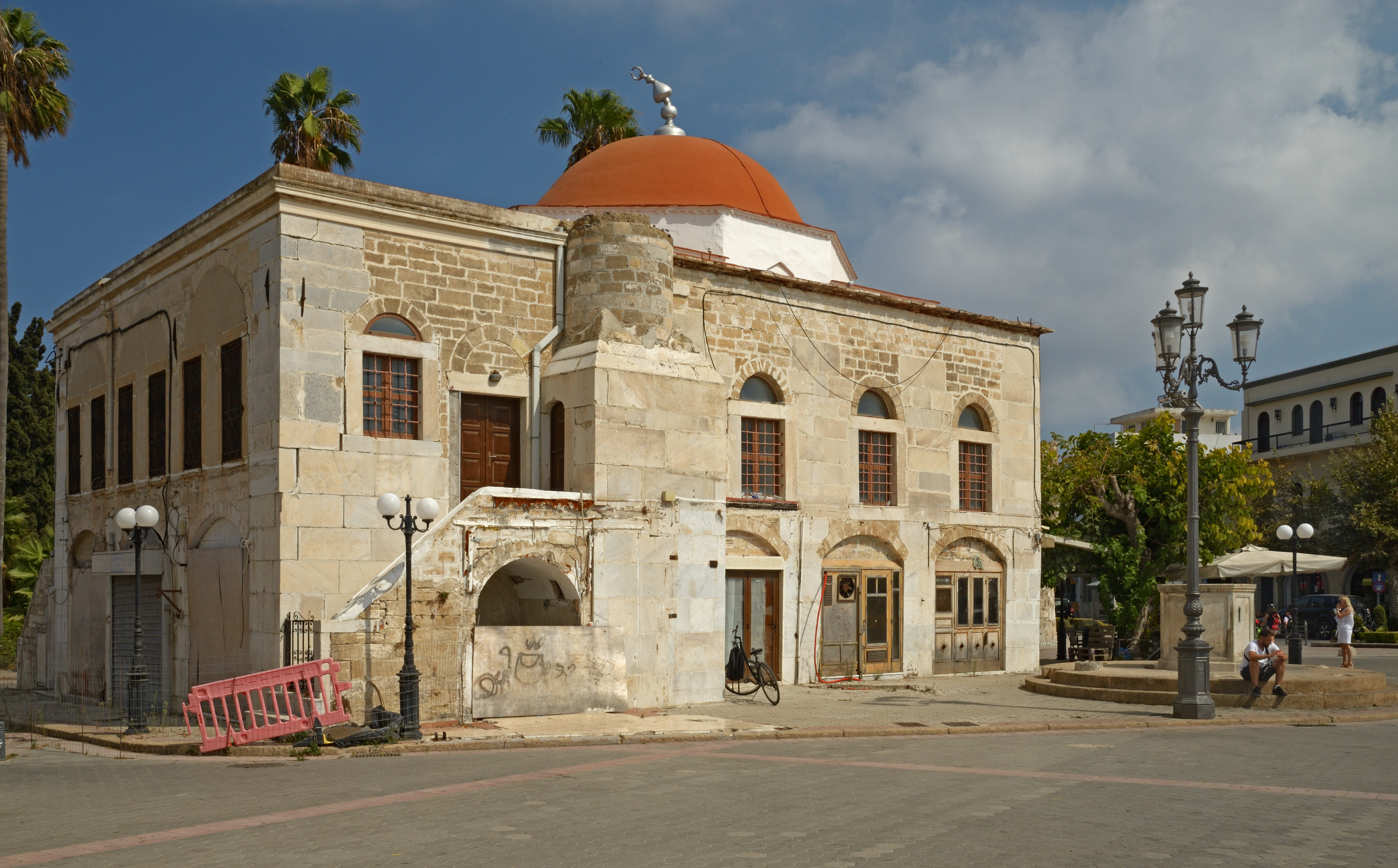
- The mosque in 2021 before restoration

- Location of the mosque in Greece

Religion
- Affiliation: Islam
- Ecclesiastical or organizational status: Mosque
- Status: Active

Location
- Location: Kos, South Aegean
- Country: Greece
- Interactive map of Defterdar Mosque
- Coordinates: 36°53′36″N 27°17′20″E

Architecture
- Type: Mosque
- Style: Ottoman
- Founder: Ibrahim Efendi
- Completed: 18th century

Specifications
- Dome: 1
- Minaret: 1
- Materials: Stone; bricks; timber; marble

The Defterdar Ibrahim Pasha Mosque (Greek: Ντεφτερντάρ Ιμπραήμ Πασά Τζαμί; Turkish: Defterdar İbrahim Paşa Camii, lit. 'Mosque of the defterdar Ibrahim Pasha') or simply Defterdar Mosque is a mosque on the island of Kos, in the South Aegean region of Greece. Built in the 18th century, during the Ottoman-era, the mosque serves the Muslim community of Kos, as one of the two out of the five Ottoman mosques to be still operational and open for worship on Kos, the other being the Gazi Hasan Pasha Mosque in the village of Platani.

== History ==
The mosque received its name from Ibrahim Efendi, an Ottoman minister of finance (defterdar), who ordered its construction at the close of the 18th century. It has been suggested that it was previously an Orthodox church dedicated to Saint Paraskevi.

The mosque was severely damaged in the great earthquakes that hit Kos in the years 1926 and 1933. The Italians, who held Kos at the time, carried out extensive restoration work, which included the removal of the upper part of the minaret and its restoration. Due to extensive damage however, the minaret had to undergo another round of restoration in between 2004 and 2005. Apart from Italian restoration work, the mosque had not been systematically maintained as of 2022.

It was heavily damaged by a 2017 earthquake, during which the minaret collapsed. Restoration works were undertaken and finally finished in June 2026; the renovated Defterdar Mosque was inaugurated by Dr. Lina Mendoni, Greek minister of culture.

== Architecture ==
Standing on Eleftherias Square in the town of Kos, it is a two-storey building of cubic form, with an octagonal dome supported by twelve arches. It is built with hewn ashlars; larger ones on the ground floor and in the lower sections and smaller ones on the first floor, arranged according to the iso-building system. Defterdar Mosque has six windows, in pairs of two placed under an arch each, but which do not end in an arch like those on the other sides, and a high cornice, which surrounds the pediment on three sides.

On the first floor there is the square prayer room, which through two doors communicates with the narrow and elongated narthex to the north. The latter is accessed by two brick staircases located on the east and west sides, respectively. The eastern staircase, the top of which is covered by a double-domed propylon, was intended for the entrance of officials to the mosque. On the north side of the main hall there is an elevated wooden gynakonitis, the quarters for women. The mihrab and the minbar can be found on the south side.

On the west side of the mosque stands the minaret, which has a single portico with a parapet, while a little beyond there is a marble octagonal fountain, covered with a vaulted building supported by six arches and short columns.

== Gallery ==
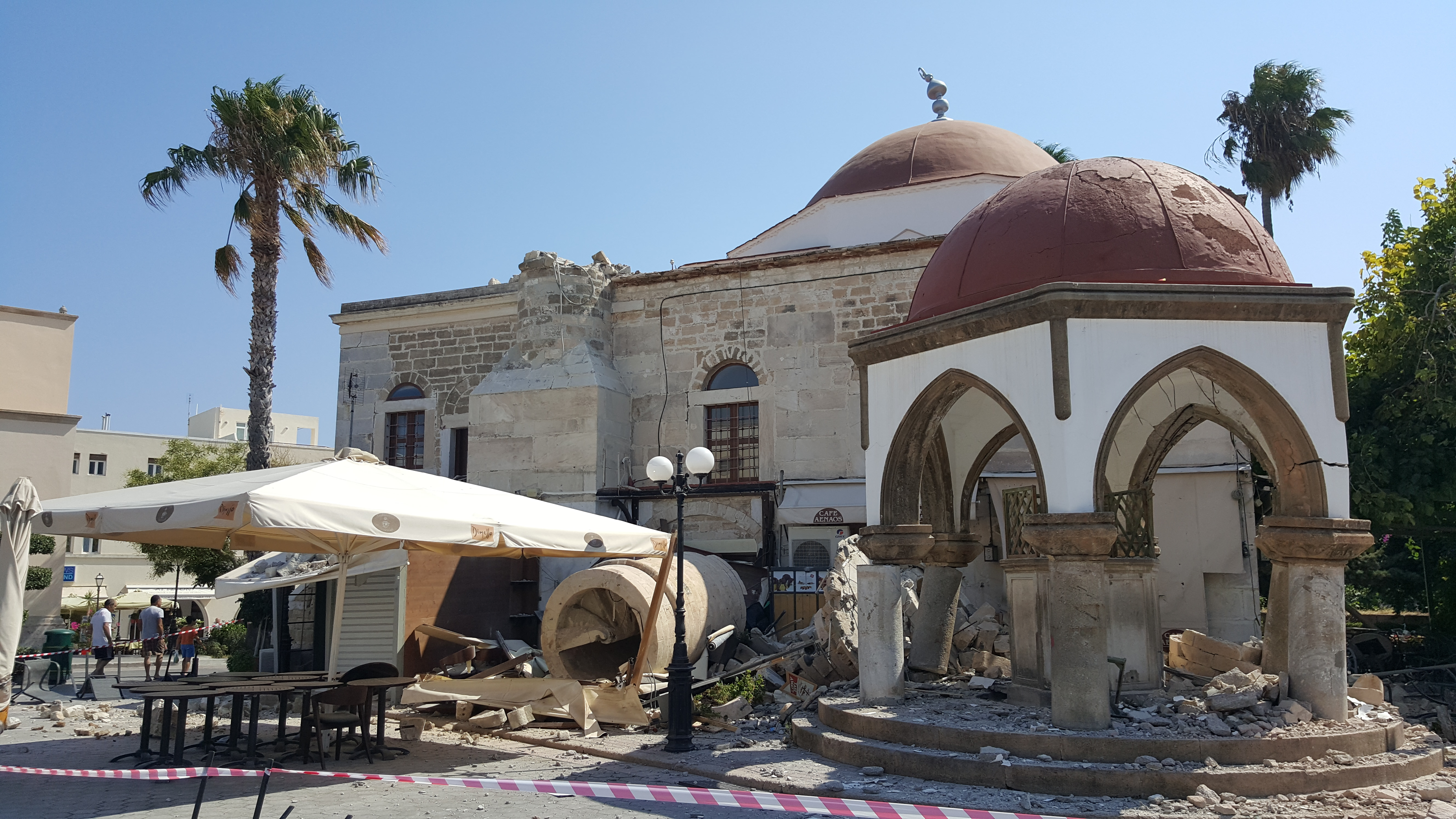
After the earthquake

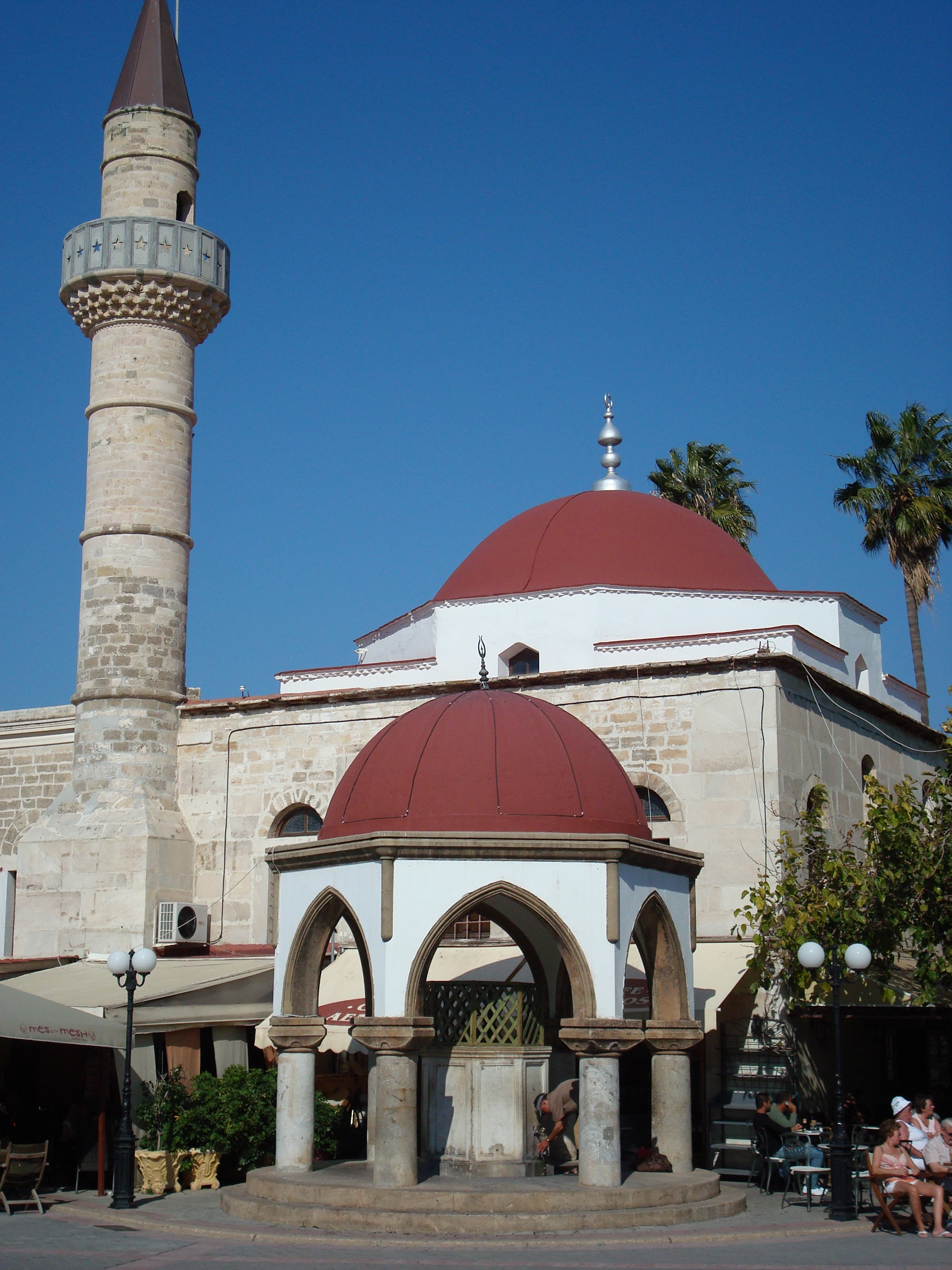
View with the minaret

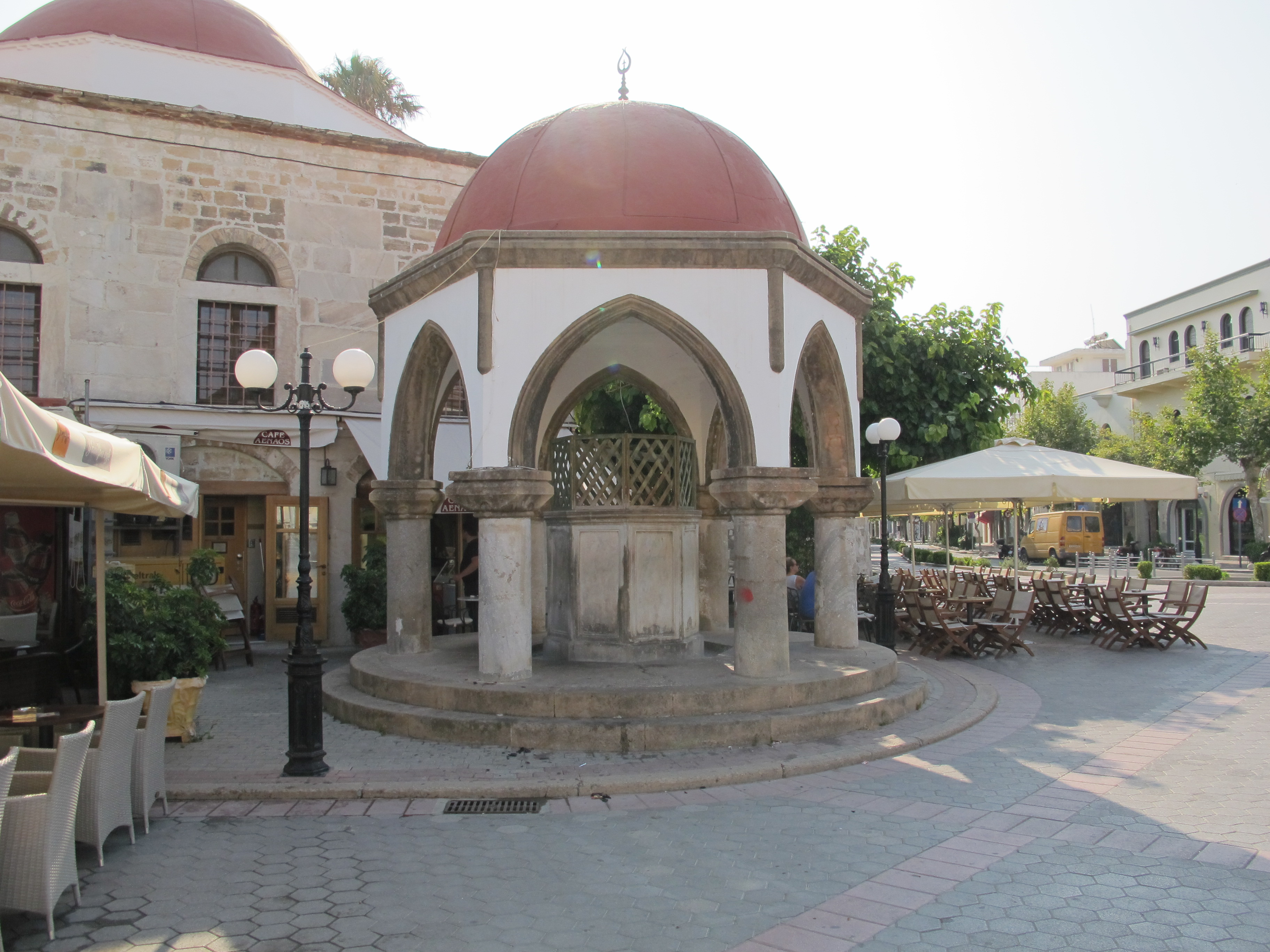
View of the fountain

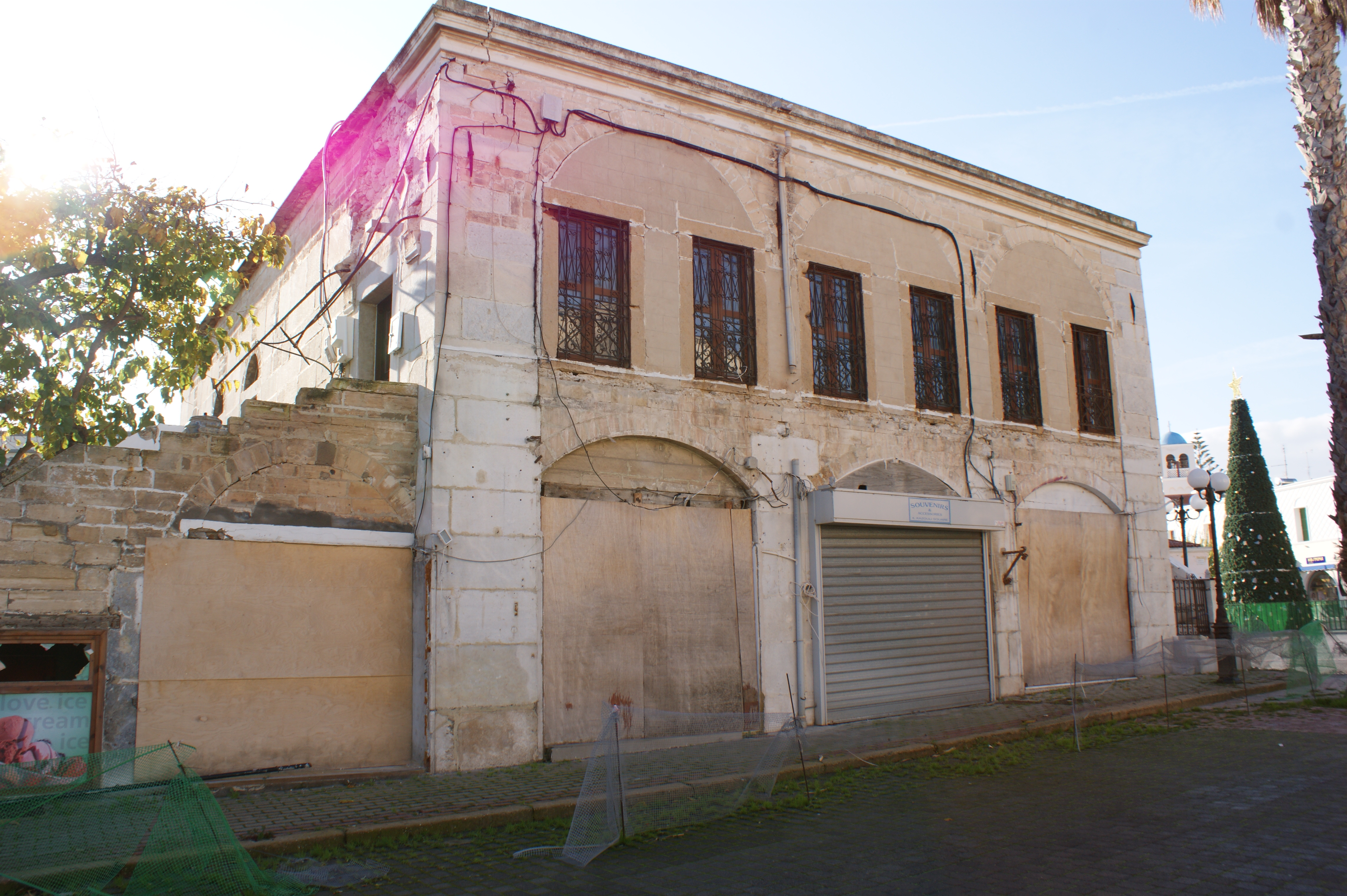
Side

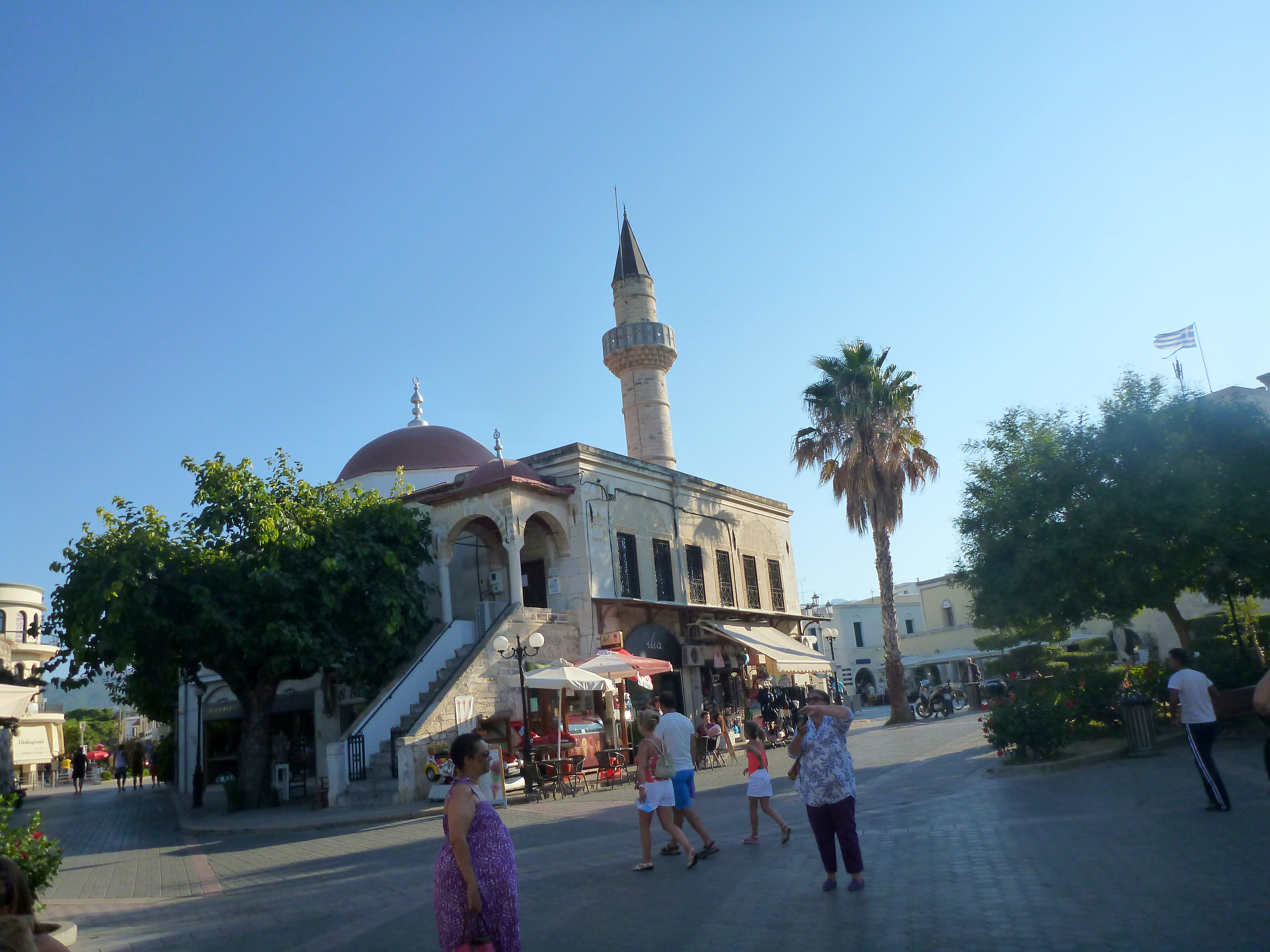
Square view

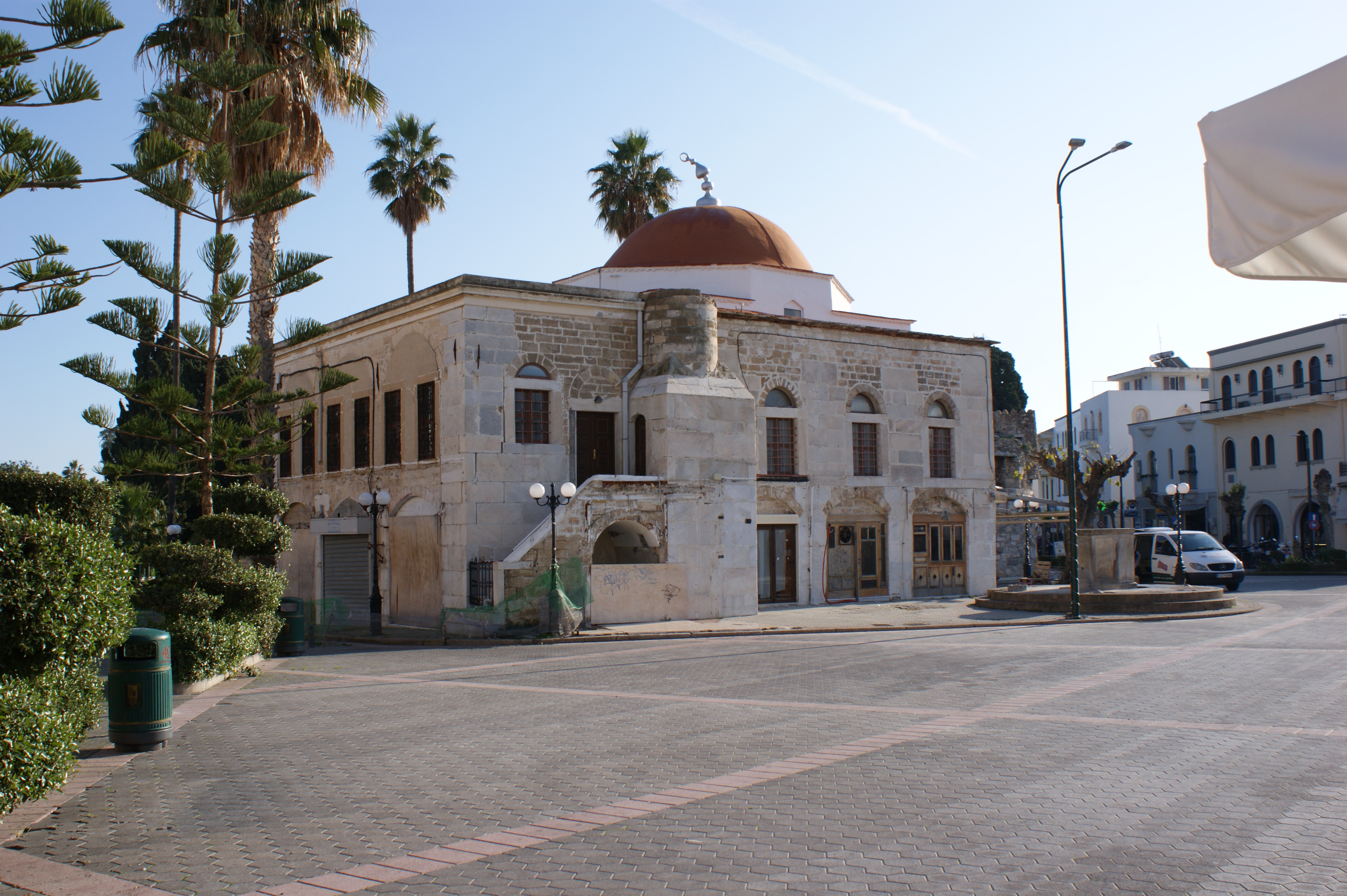
Remains of the minaret

== See also ==
- Islam in Greece
- List of mosques in Greece
