= Pure and Applied Geophysics =

- Discipline: Geophysics
- Language: English
- Edited by: Carla F. Braitenberg, Alexander B. Rabinovich, Renata Dmowska

Publication details
- Former name(s): Geofisica Pura e Applicata
- History: 1939-present
- Publisher: Birkhäuser
- Frequency: Monthly
- Open access: Hybrid
- Impact factor: 2.641 (2021)

Standard abbreviations
- ISO 4: Pure Appl. Geophys.

Indexing
- CODEN: PAGYAV
- ISSN: 0033-4553 (print); 1420-9136 (web)
- LCCN: 74641511
- OCLC no.: 525783216
- Geofisica Pura e Applicata
- CODEN: GFPAA8
- ISSN: 0367-4355
- LCCN: 45025197
- OCLC no.: 1332190543

Links
- Journal homepage; Online archive

Pure and Applied Geophysics is a monthly peer-reviewed scientific journal that covers research in the field of geophysics. It is published by Birkhäuser and the editors-in-chief are Carla F. Braitenberg (University of Trieste), Alexander B. Rabinovich (Russian Academy of Sciences), and Renata Dmowska (Harvard University). The journal was established in 1939 as Geofisica Pura e Applicata before obtaining its current title in 1964.

== Abstracting and indexing ==
The journal is abstracted and indexed in:

- Aquatic Sciences and Fisheries Abstracts
- Current Contents/Physical, Chemical & Earth Sciences
- EBSCO databases
- Ei Compendex
- GEOBASE
- Inspec
- ProQuest databases
- Science Citation Index Expanded
- Scopus

According to the Journal Citation Reports, the journal has a 2021 impact factor of 2.641.
