= 2017 Aegean Sea earthquake =

Earthquake in Greece and Turkey

2017 Bodrum–Kos earthquake
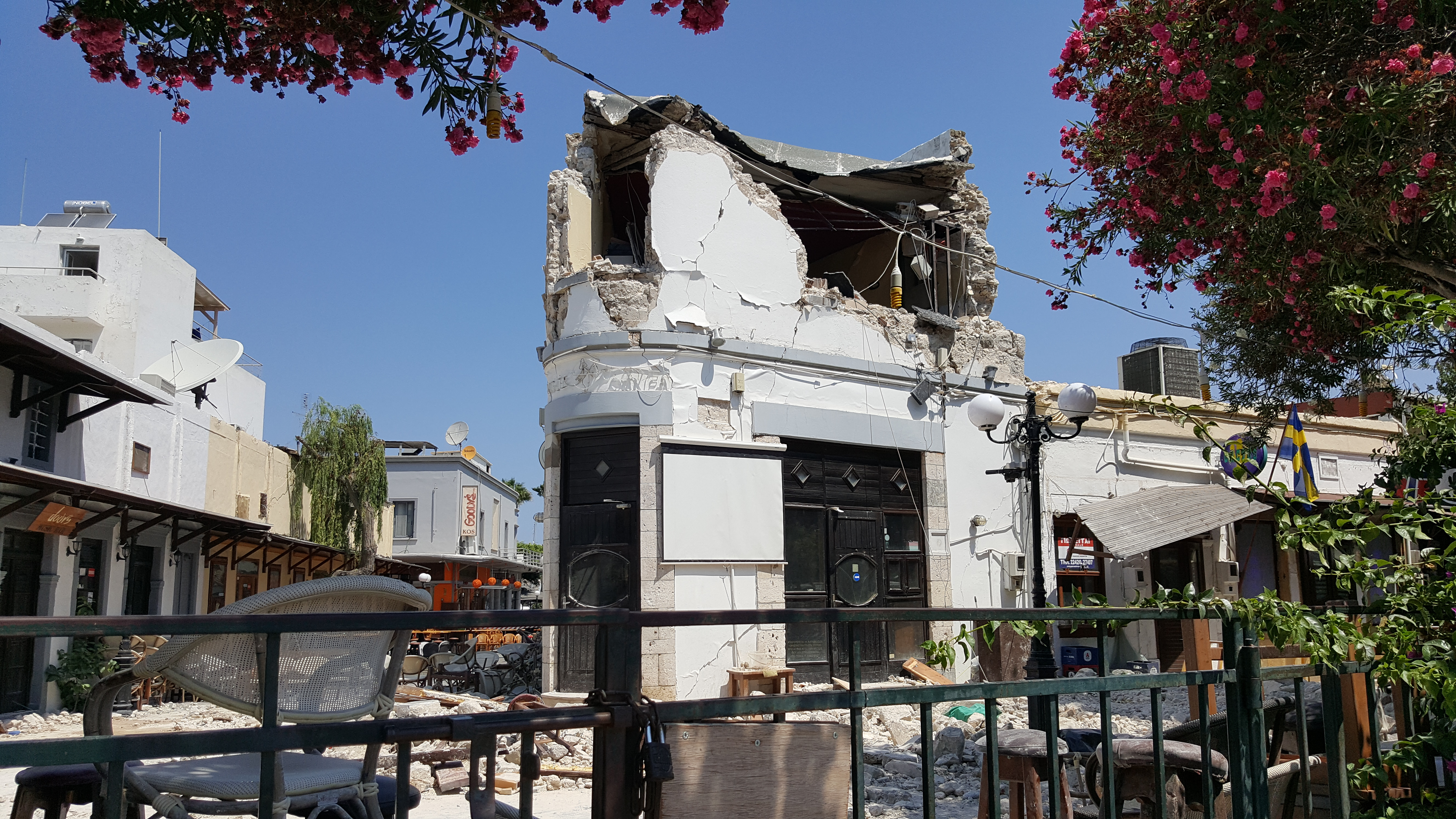
- A damaged bar in Kos
- UTC time: 2017-07-20 22:31:11
- ISC event: 610790782
- USGS-ANSS: ComCat
- Local date: 21 July 2017
- Local time: 01:31 (EEST) (UTC+03.00)
- Magnitude: 6.6 M_{w}
- Depth: 7.0 km (4.3 mi)
- Epicenter: 36.923°N 27.415°E
- Type: Normal faulting
- Areas affected: Greece; Turkey
- Max. intensity: MMI VII (Very strong)
- Tsunami: Up to 1.9 m (6.2 ft) along the Greek and Turkish coasts
- Aftershocks: 390 aftershocks (M > 3.0) in 1 year, the highest being a M_{w}^{(KOERI)} 5.3
- Casualties: 2 killed, 480 injured

On 21 July 2017, a large earthquake measuring 6.6 on the moment magnitude scale struck close to the tourist locations of Kos in Greece and Bodrum in Turkey, killing 2 people and injuring hundreds. Mostly referenced as the 2017 Bodrum–Kos earthquake, this earthquake generated a tsunami which was one of the largest tsunamis in the Mediterranean Sea region.

== Tectonic setting ==
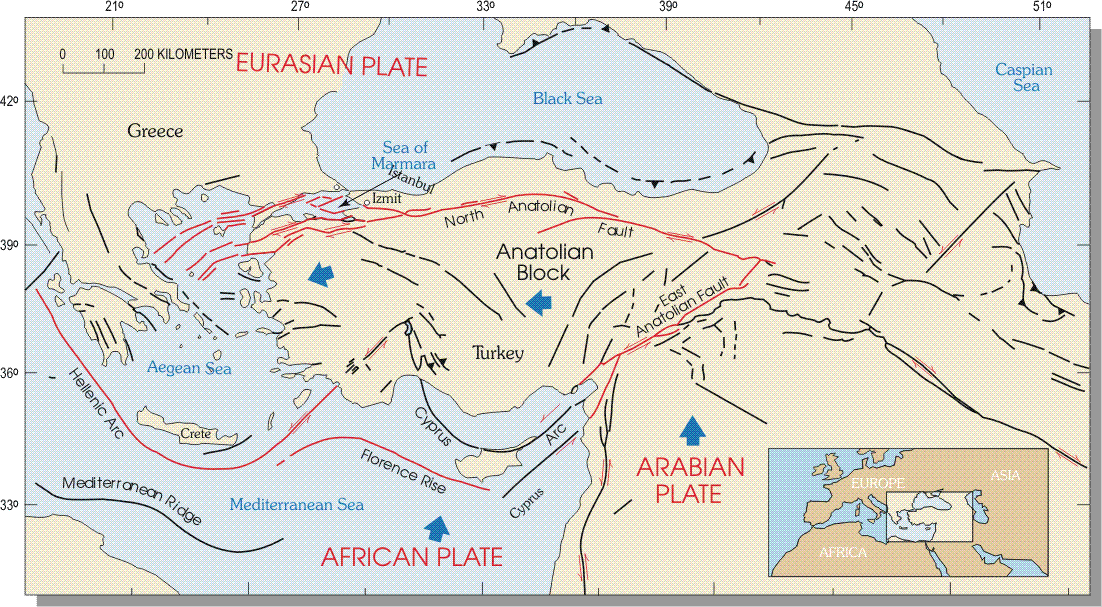
Tectonic map of Turkey.

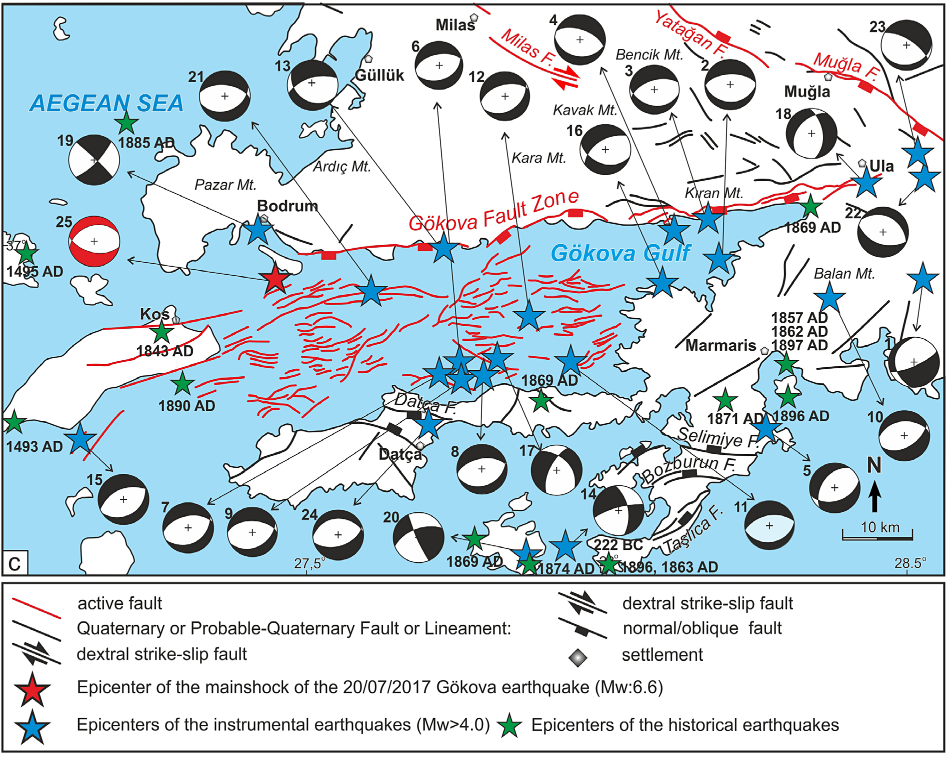
Seismotectonic map of the Gulf of Gökova. The red star marks the epicenter of the 2017 earthquake.

The Eastern Mediterranean where the earthquake occurred is an area of complex tectonics related to the collision of the Eurasian plate, African plate and Arabian plate. Continental collision occur here, including subduction of the African plate lithosphere under the Eurasian plate (specifically, the Aegean Plate and the Anatolian Plate); the transform boundary between the African plate and Arabian plate which forms the Dead Sea Transform; and the convergent boundary separating the Aegean and Anatolian Plate.

The Aegean region, is a seismically and volcanically active area that has been deformed under a north-to-south extensional tectonic regime at up to 30-40 mm/yr since the Pliocene. Where the epicenter of the earthquake is located, the Gulf of Gökova is an east–west trending asymmetric graben measuring 120 km (75 mi) long and 5–30 km (3–19 mi) wide. It developed on nappes which are filled with Pliocene to Quaternary marine sediments. The depression is bordered by the Datça Peninsula to the south, Kos to the west, and the Bodrum Peninsula to the north. The northern part of the graben is dominated by the Gökova Fault Zone which is one of the most seismically active fault structures in southwestern Anatolia. It is an east–west and northeast–southwest trending arc-shaped fault zone. The Gökova Fault Zone contains a complex fault pattern which could be related to the interaction between deep strike-slip faults and shallower normal faults. According to observed geological markers, the combined offset of the fault zone is about 1,000 m (3,281 ft) since the Pliocene period. This suggests a slip rate of around 0.2 mm/yr. Most faults in the fault zone are underwater while some are visible on land.

=== Past seismicity ===
In historical times, many large earthquakes have struck the Gökova associated with the fault zone. Historical earthquakes with a record of damage include 412 BC, 227 BC, 199–198 BC, 24 BC, 141 AD, 174 AD, 344 AD, 474 AD, 554 AD, 1493 AD, 1851 AD, 1863 AD and 1869 AD events. In the 1493 event, the city of Bodrum was totally destroyed. In the 20th century, large instrumentally recorded events (events recorded by seismometers or other instruments) include those of 1933 and 1941 with magnitudes of 6.4 and 6.0 respectively.

== Earthquake ==
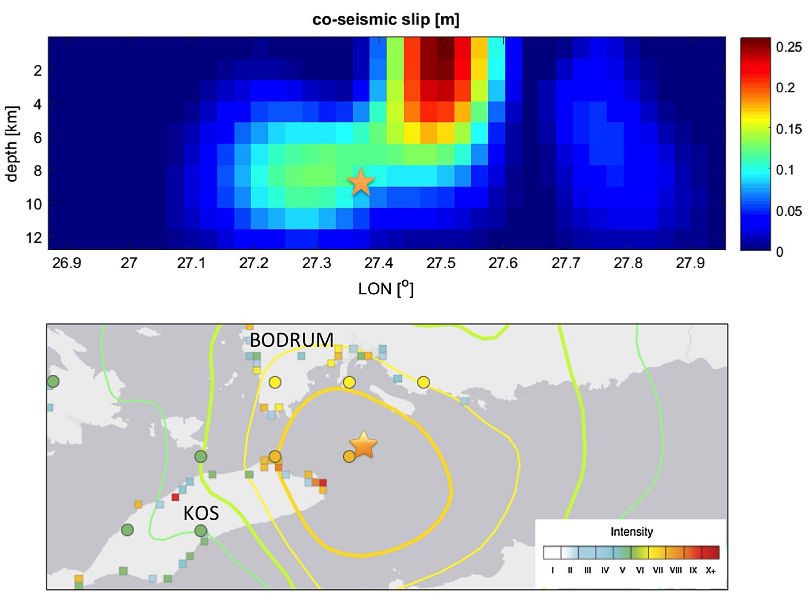
Distribution of the slip along the fault (top) and intensity map (bottom)

The M_{w} 6.6 earthquake struck at 01:31 on 21 July 2017 at a depth of 7 km. It caused shaking assigned MMI VII (Very strong). Focal mechanism solutions of the earthquake indicate this event was generated by an east–west trending normal fault within the lithosphere within the Aegean Plate. Coulomb stress modeling showed the earthquake ruptured an area with around 16 km (10 mi) length and 11 km (7 mi) width on a west-southwest to east-northeast direction.

=== Deformation ===
Ground deformation and displacement of the mainshock faulting were observed via GPS and interferograms. Most of the deformation was observed in Karaada, near the epicenter.

== Tsunami ==
Relative to the large magnitude and large depth, the earthquake generated a tsunami which was one of the largest ever recorded in the Mediterranean since records began in 426 BC. The tsunami was first picked up by a tide gauge in Bodrum, which measured 0.11 m (4 in). In the next few weeks after the main earthquake, field surveys were performed. As a result of the surveys, tsunami inundations as much as 100 m (328 ft) were observed with a run-up height of 1.9 m (6 ft). Many dead fish were found, cars were dragged and boats were damaged.

== Damage ==
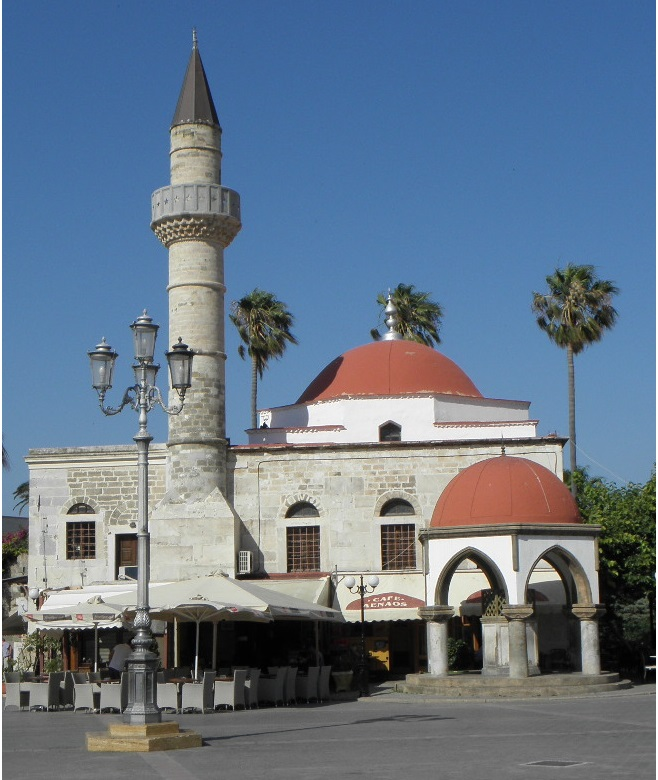
The Defterdar Mosque on Kos (pictured here in 2011) before...

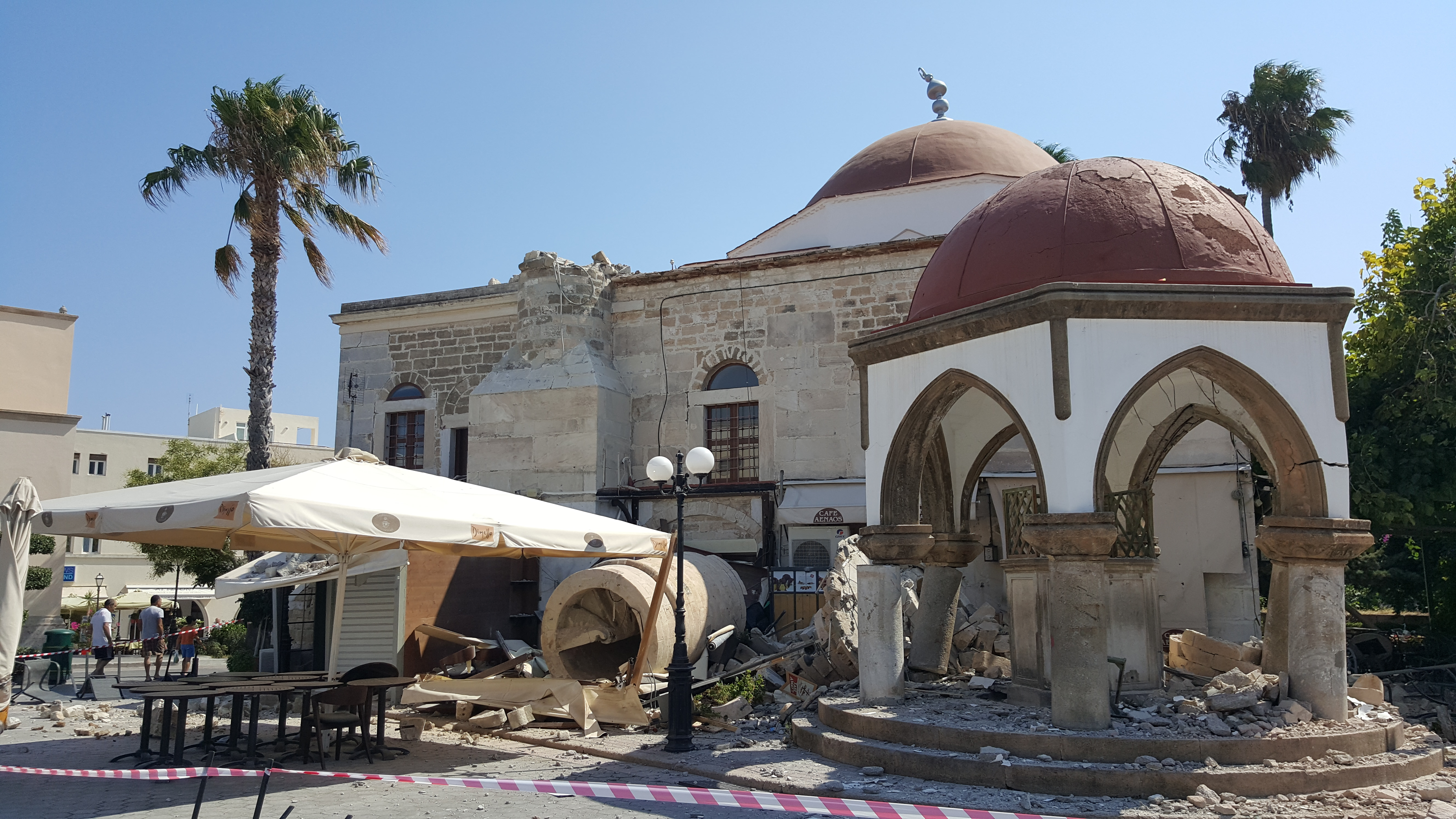
...and after the earthquake.

Extensive damage took place on the island of Kos, and to a lesser degree in the area around Bodrum. On Kos, the old town was worst affected, with the cathedral, the 18th-century Defterdar Mosque, and a 14th-century castle being badly damaged. The main harbour had its floor crack as a result of the tremor, and was subsequently declared unsafe for use by government officials, who rerouted all ferries to the smaller port town of Kefalos in west Kos.

Two fatalities were reported on the island, in addition to more than 120 injuries. The two dead were identified as Turkish and Swedish nationals, and were killed when the upper facade of a bar collapsed on top of them. Seven seriously injured people on Kos were flown to hospitals in Athens and Heraklion, including two men from Sweden and Norway in critical condition. Around 360 people were injured in Bodrum, many after jumping out of windows in panic, but none of the injuries were regarded as serious.

== See also ==
- List of earthquakes in Greece
- List of earthquakes in Turkey
- List of earthquakes in 2017
- 2014 Aegean Sea earthquake
- 2020 Aegean Sea earthquake

== Sources ==
- Reilinger, R.; McClusky, S.; Vernant, P.; Lawrence, S. (2006). "GPS Constraints on Continental Deformation in the Africa-Arabia-Eurasia Continental Collision Zone and Implications for the Dynamics of Plate Interactions". Journal of Geophysical Research: Atmospheres. 111 (B5) 2005JB004051. Bibcode:2006JGRB..111.5411R. doi:10.1029/2005JB004051.
- Tiryakioğlu, I.; Aktuğ, B.; Yiğit, C. Ö.; Yavaşoğlu, H. H.; Sözbilir, H.; Özkaymak, Ç. H.; Poyraz, F.; Taneli, E.; Bulut, F.; Doğru, A.; Özener, H. (2017). "Slip distribution and source parameters of the 20 July 2017 Bodrum-Kos earthquake (Mw6.6) from GPS observations". Geodinamica Acta. 30 (1): 1–14. doi:10.1080/09853111.2017.1408264. S2CID 133888023.
- Karasözen, E.; Nissen, E.; Büyükakpınar, P.; Cambaz, M. D.; Kahraman, M.; Ertan, E. K.; Abgarmi, B.; Bergman, E.; Ghods, A.; Özacar, A. A. (2018). "The 2017 July 20 Mw 6.6 Bodrum–Kos earthquake illuminates active faulting in the Gulf of Gökova, SW Turkey". Geophysical Journal International. 214 (1): 185–199. doi:10.1093/gji/ggy114. hdl:11511/47511.
- Cordrie, L.; Gailler, A.; Heinrich, P.; Briole, P.; Ganas, A. (2021). "The July 20, 2017 Mw = 6.6 Bodrum-Kos Earthquake, Southeast Aegean Sea: Contribution of the Tsunami Modeling to the Assessment of the Fault Parameters". Pure and Applied Geophysics. 178 (1): 4865–4889. Bibcode:2021PApGe.178.4865C. doi:10.1007/s00024-021-02766-3. S2CID 235419664.
- Ocakoğlu, N.; Nomikou, P.; İşcan, Y.; Loreto, M. F.; Lampridou, D. (2019). "Evidence of extensional and strike-slip deformation in the offshore Gökova-Kos area affected by the July 2017 Mw6.6 Bodrum-Kos earthquake, eastern Aegean Sea". Pure and Applied Geophysics. 38 (1): 211–225. doi:10.1007/s00367-017-0532-4. S2CID 134283066.
- Dogan, G. G.; Annunziato, A.; Papadopoulos, G. A.; Guler, H. G. (2019). "The 20th July 2017 Bodrum–Kos Tsunami Field Survey". Pure and Applied Geophysics. 176 (1): 2925–2949. Bibcode:2019PApGe.176.2925D. doi:10.1007/s00024-019-02151-1. hdl:11511/35077. S2CID 135425060.
