= Panathinaikos (disambiguation) =

Panathinaikos is a major Greek multi-sport club based in Athens.

Panathinaikos is a Greek term (pan- + athinaikos, meaning 'all-Athenian'), which may also refer to:

- Panathinaikos F.C., football team
- Panathinaikos B.C., basketball team
- Panathinaikos Chicago, American soccer club
- Panathinaikos Movement, Greek political party

== See also ==
- Panathinaikos F.C. New Stadium, football stadium under construction in Athens
