= Lembet Mosque =

Former mosque in Thessaloniki, Greece

- Τζαμί του Λεμπέτ
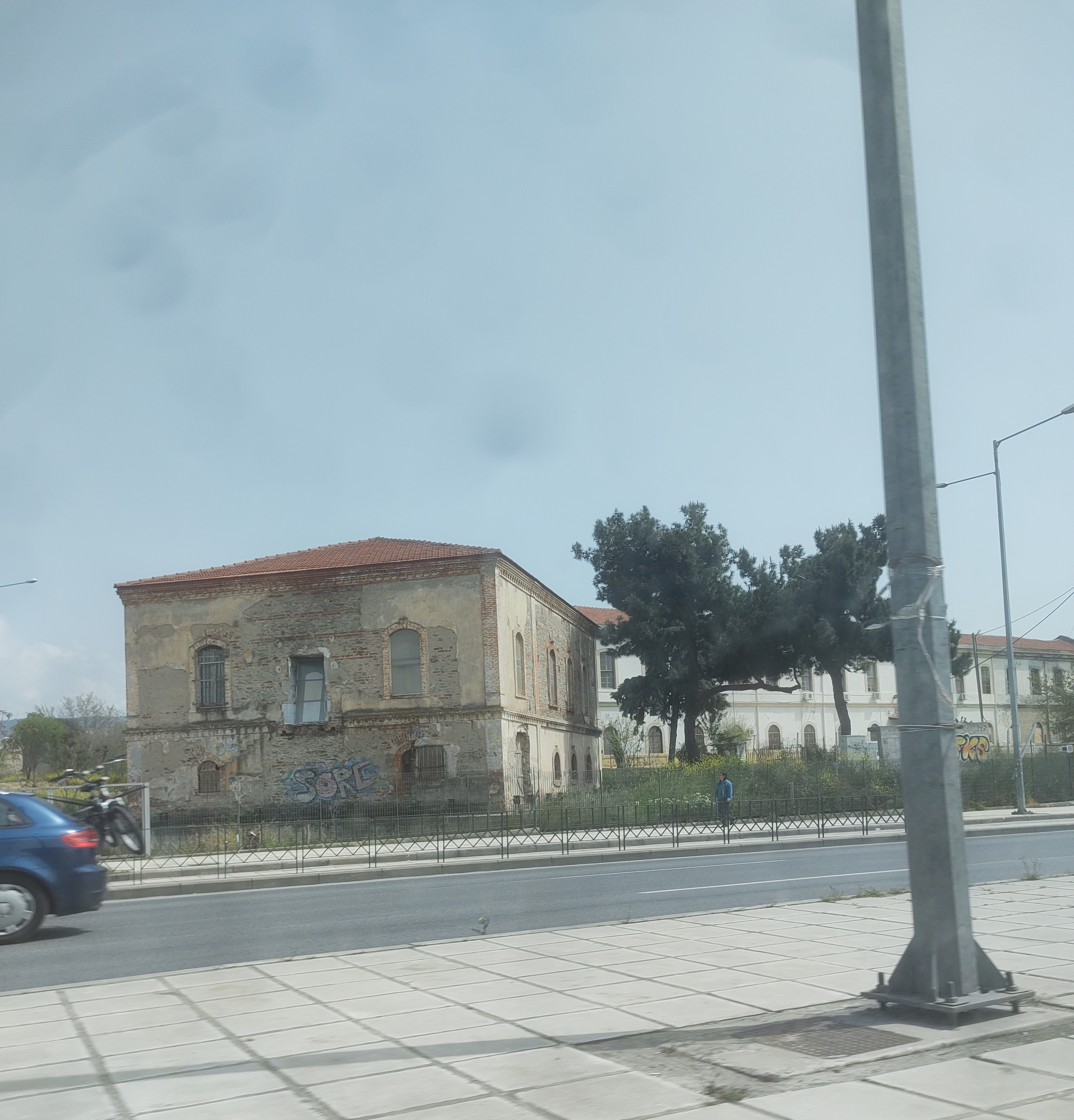

- Location of the former mosque in Greece

Religion
- Affiliation: Islam (former)
- Ecclesiastical or organizational status: Mosque (1903–1912)
- Status: Abandoned (as a mosque); Preserved (as a monument)

Location
- Location: Thessaloniki, Pavlos Melas, Central Macedonia
- Country: Greece
- Interactive map of Lembet Mosque
- Coordinates: 40°39′39″N 22°56′10″E

Architecture
- Type: Mosque
- Style: Ottoman
- Founder: Hasan Fehmi Pasha
- Completed: 1903

Specifications
- Length: 18.19 m (59.7 ft)
- Width: 13.52 m (44.4 ft)
- Height (max): 11.22 m (36.8 ft)
- Minaret: 1 (destroyed?)
- Materials: Brick; stone

The Lembet Mosque (Greek: Τζαμί του Λεμπέτ, Turkish: Lembet Camii) is a former mosque in the city of Thessaloniki, Pavlos Melas, in the Central Macedonia region of Greece, named after the Lembet barracks, now known as Pavlos Melas barracks. It was the last mosque built in Thessaloniki, during the Ottoman era, before the city's incorporation into the Kingdom of Greece in 1912 following the First Balkan War.

In 2013, the mosque's original name, Ferideh Hanim Mosque (Greek: Φεριντέ Χανούμ Τζαμί, Turkish: Feride Hanım Camii), was discovered thanks to an old inscription. It was named after Ferideh Hanim, the wife of Thessaloniki's then governor, Hassan Fehmi Pasha.

== History ==
In 1903, during the last years of the Ottoman Empire's rule over the Macedonia, the Lembet Mosque was erected in Thessaloniki—the last to be built in the city—in the Topşu Kislaçi plot. It was inaugurated on August 18, 1903.

After the Ottoman army was defeated in the Battle of Yenidje (modern Giannitsa) during the First Balkan War in 1912, the city of Thessaloniki was incorporated to the Kingdom of Greece, and the military encampment the mosque was situated in was used by the Greek troops. The mosque itself served for non-religious purposes, but it is not clear when it was officially put to new use.

In 1999 the Greek army started to transfer use to the city municipal administration, and this procedure continued until 2017. In 2003, the Greek Ministry of Culture and Sports declared the former mosque a preserved monument. Meanwhile in 2005, work began for the widening of the main road connecting Thessaloniki to the north (Lagkadas and Serres) and the east of the country; the mosque found itself in the middle of the widened road. As a result, the mosque was moved 22 metres (72 ft) along its long axis (to the direction of Mecca). The base of the minaret, however, had to be demolished.

In 2011, restoration works began on the mosque. Although the local Muslim community requested the mosque be opened to worship again, their request was eventually rejected.

== Architecture ==
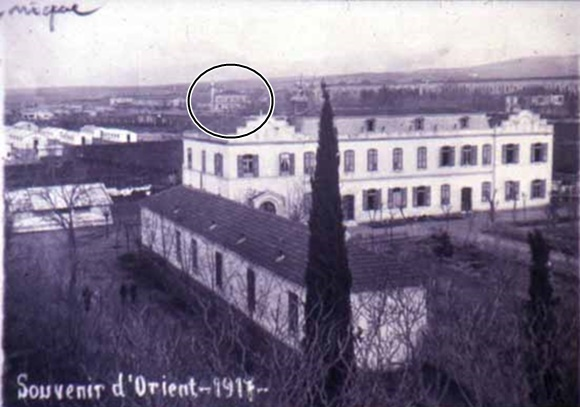
The mosque behind the House of the Vicentian Sisters.

The Lembet Mosque has two storeys, and a minaret on the middle of the northwest facade. On the ground floor there are two entrances, two vestibules and two chambers, a storage room and a staircase leading to the upper floor. The use of the rooms on the ground floor is not known. On the floor there is an antechamber and the prayer room. The building inscription, found on the vestibule of the first floor, is the only thing that testifies to Ferideh's connection to the mosque, and thus Lembet's original name.

The floor dimensions of the former mosque are 18.19 by 13.52 metres (59.7 by 44.4 ft). The former mosque is 11.22 metres (36.8 ft) tall, including the roof that is 3.22 metres (10.6 ft) tall. The area of each floor is 247.5 square metres (2,664 sq ft). The external walls on the ground floor are 90 centimetres (35 in) thick, and the internal walls range between 60 and 90 centimetres (24 and 35 in) thick. The external walls on the first floor are 80 centimetres (31 in) thick, and the internal walls are 70 centimetres (28 in) thick.

The ceilings are made of wood, its simple decoration achieved by the arrangement of the boards, with additional rods and with relief elements. In the center of the mihrab hall there is a dome in the shape of a cruciform decorated with additional wooden elements. Around its perimeter, alternating rectangular and square sections are formed.

During the 2011 restoration works, the roof was restored, the windows of the upper floor were protected, the asbestos flues outside the building were removed, newer paltry interior walls and dropped ceilings were demolished, the mihrab was spotlighted, parts of the wall drawings were uncovered, the interior wooden staircase was reconstructed, the area surrounding the mosque was clear-cut and coated with grid and concrete, and the terrain was fenced.

== See also ==
- Islam in Greece
- List of former mosques in Greece
- Ottoman Greece
