= Musa Baba türbe =

Mausoleum in Thessaloniki, Greece

Coordinates: 40°38′31.6″N 22°57′1.1″E

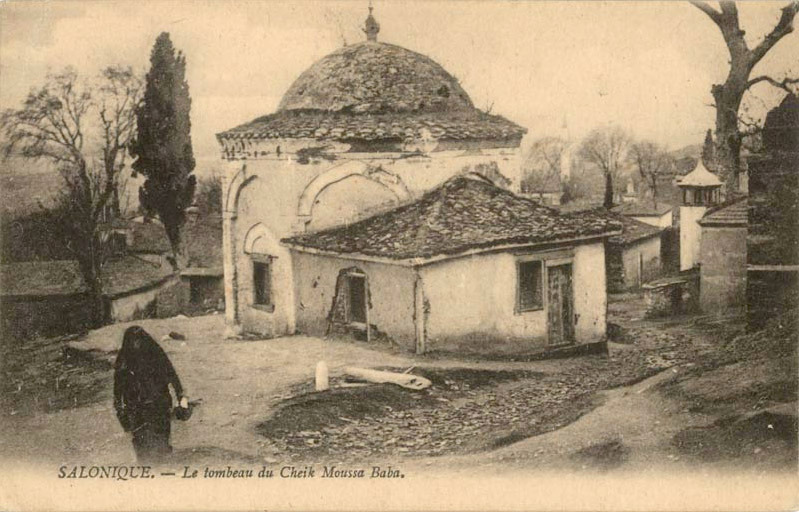
The türbe in the early twentieth century.

The Musa Baba Türbe (Greek: Τεκές Μουσά Μπαμπά) is a türbe (mausoleum) from the Ottoman period in the Upper Town of Thessaloniki in Greece, in Terpsitheas Square. It dates to the sixteenth century.

== Description ==
The türbe is an octagonal building and the resting place of one Musa Baba (after whom it took its name), a holy Muslim person according to the Bektashi Order. The current courtyard of Terpsithea was the courtyard of a tekke (a Dervish gathering spot) in the past. In 2011 restoration works on the türbe began.

When Christian refugees from Asia Minor arrived in the city following the population exchange between Greece and Turkey in 1923 they continued to use the building. South of the türbe lies a shrine to Saint Charalampus.

== See also ==
- Bedesten of Thessaloniki
- Hayriyye Madrasa
- Kütüklü Baba Tekke
