= Budala Hodja Tekke =

Historical Sufi lodge in Thermes, Greece

Coordinates: 41°20′56.0″N 25°00′18.0″E

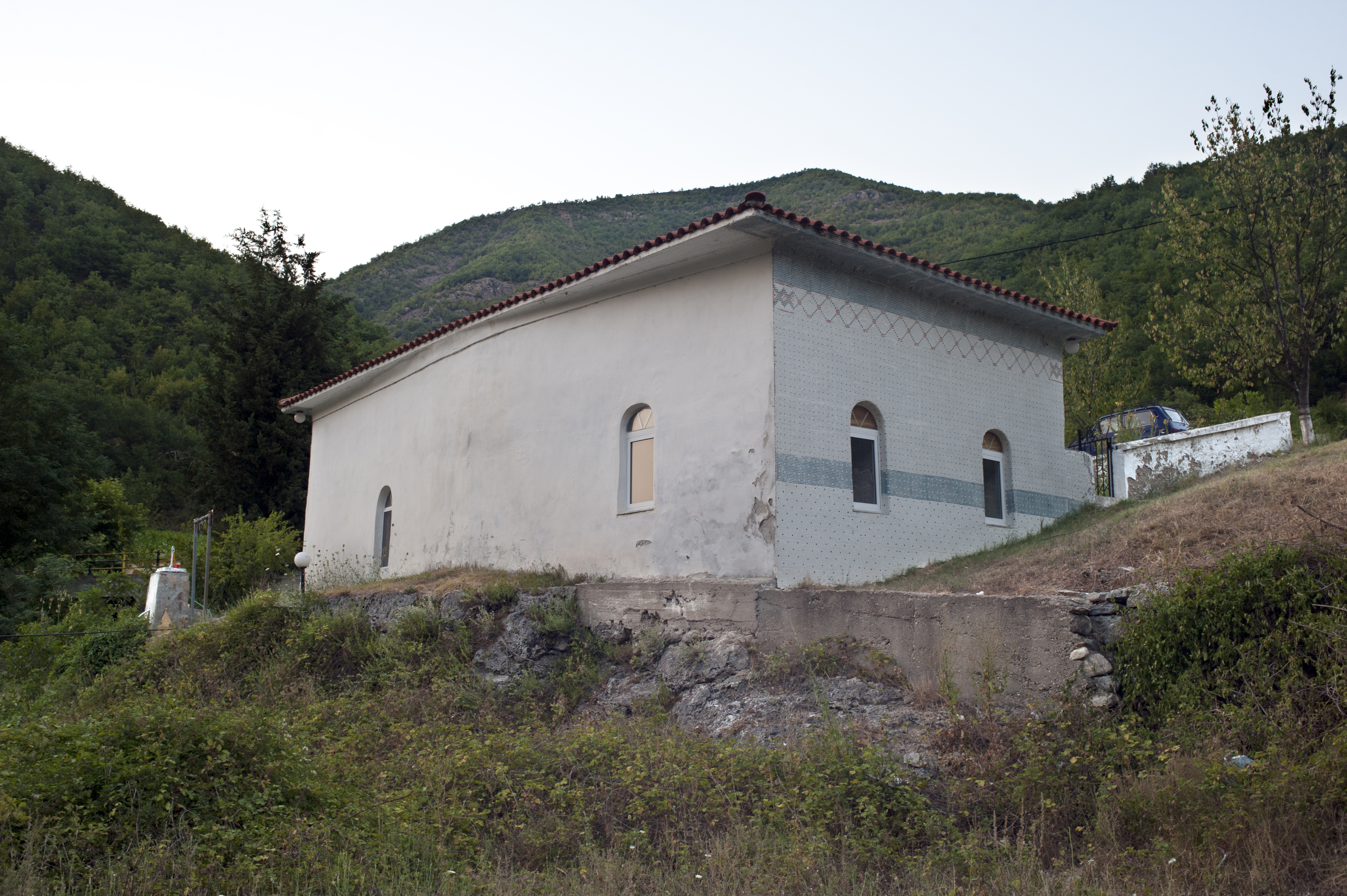
The Budala Hodja Tekke.

The Budala Hodja Tekke (Greek: Τεκές του Μπουνταλά Χότζα, Turkish: Budala Hoca Tekkesi) is a historical religious structure in Greece dating from the Ottoman Period (c. 1450 – 1820). It was a Sufi lodge, called a tekke by the Ottoman Sufi adherents who used it.

Budala Hodja Tekke is in Western Thrace, close to Greece's border with Bulgaria, in the village of Thermes in the Xanthi regional unit.

== Description ==
The tekke building includes a türbe (a type of mausoleum), a gathering hall, and a hammam, or Turkish bathhouse. The tekke was renovated recently with funding from Saudi Arabia. This renovation, according to historian Heath W. Lowry, destroyed the original shape of the tekke. The only reminder of the original shape is a domed section of the hammam.

The hammam is located on a river bank. Bathwater comes from a nearby hot spring; the temperature can be as high as 41 degrees Celsius.

== Gallery ==
Budala Hodga Tekke
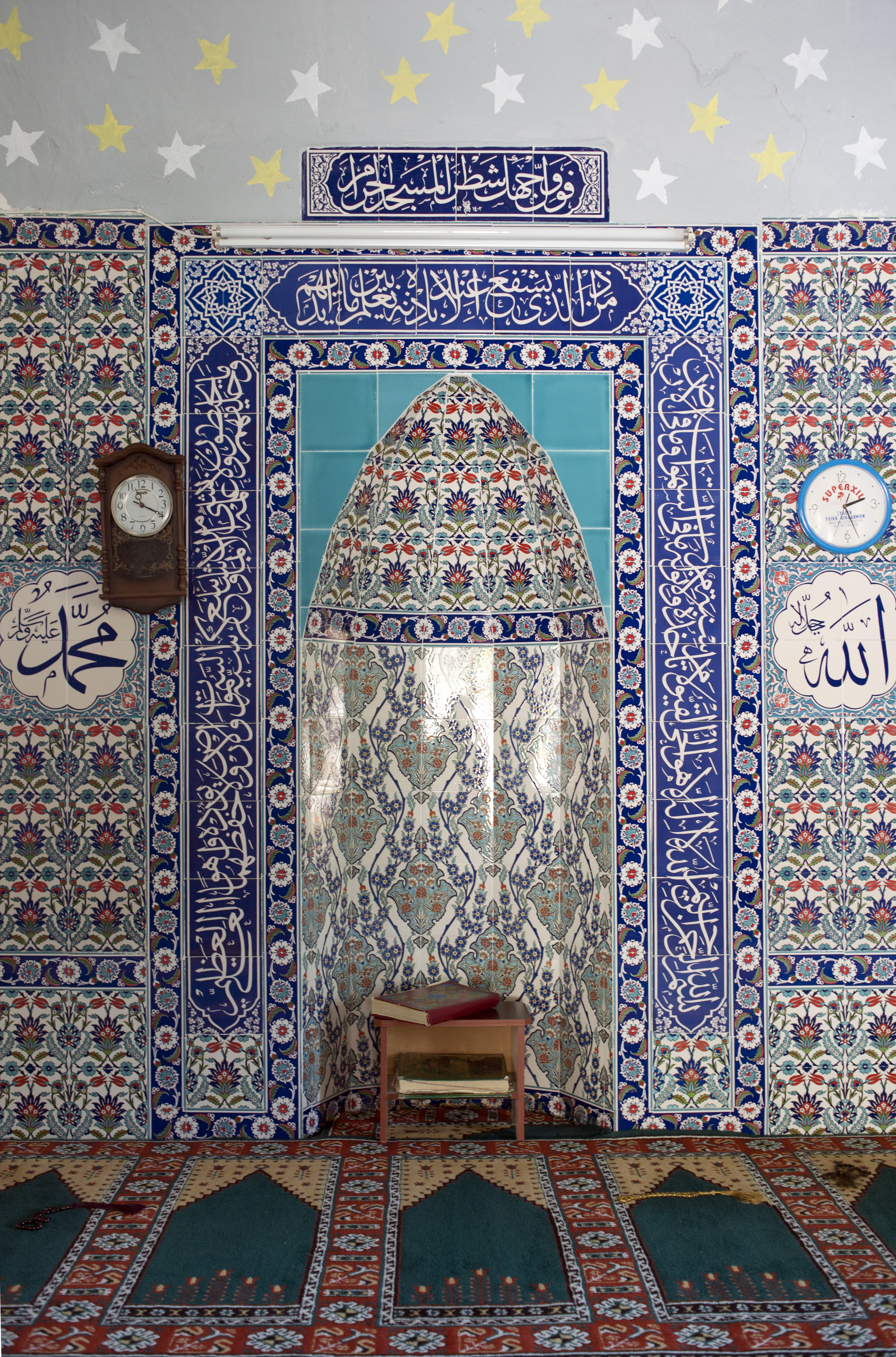
Mihrab in the prayer niche

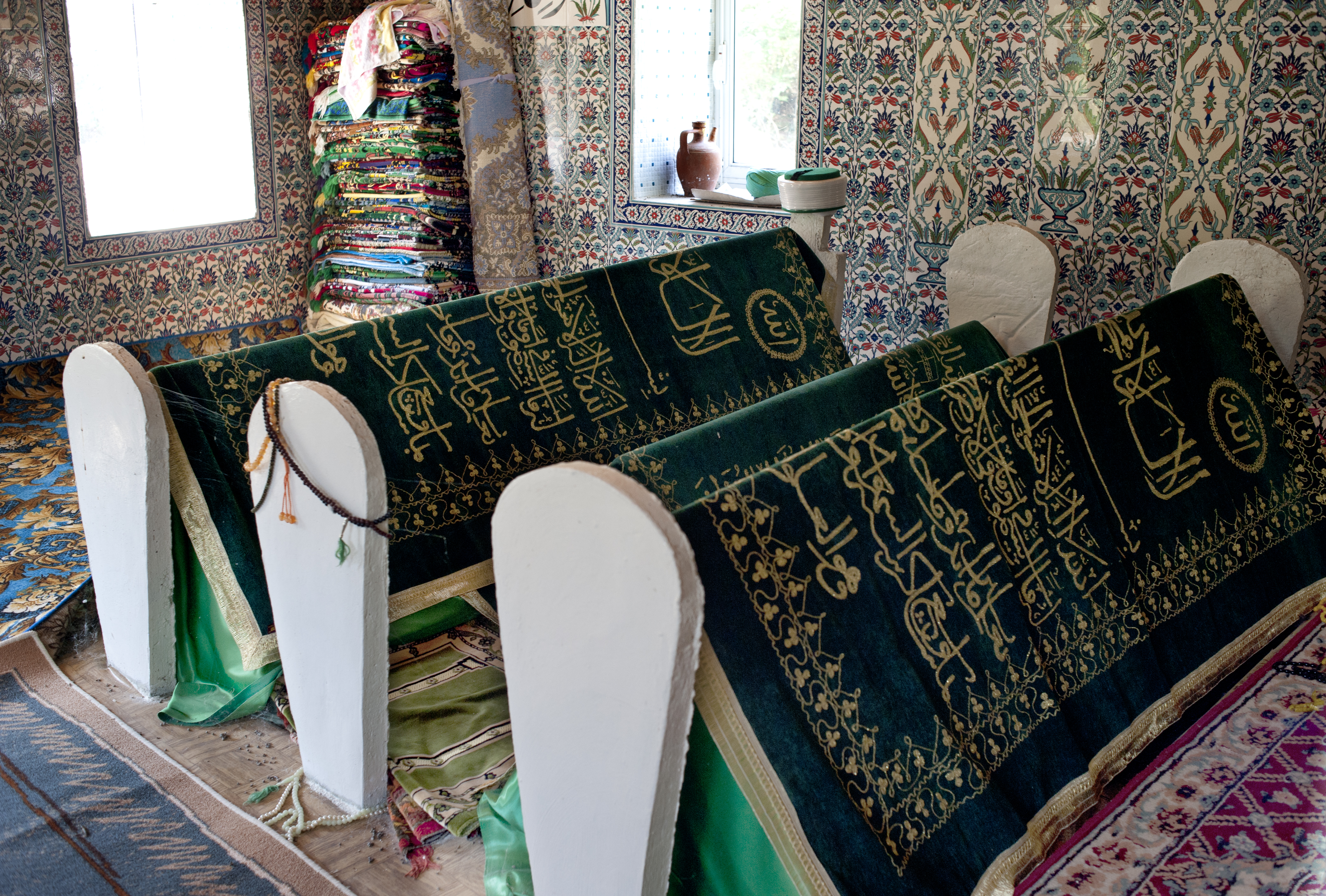
Türbe inside

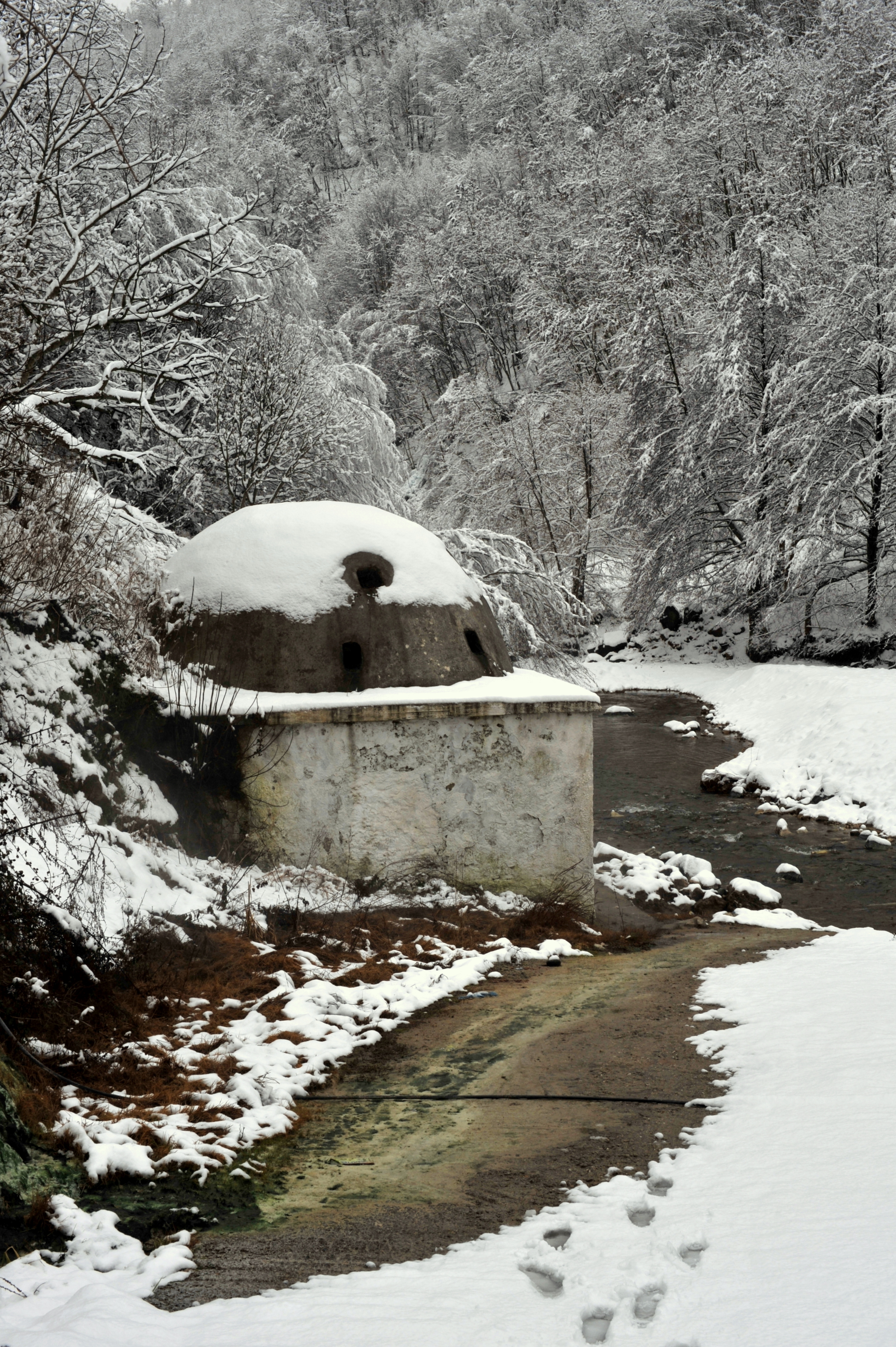
Domed hammam

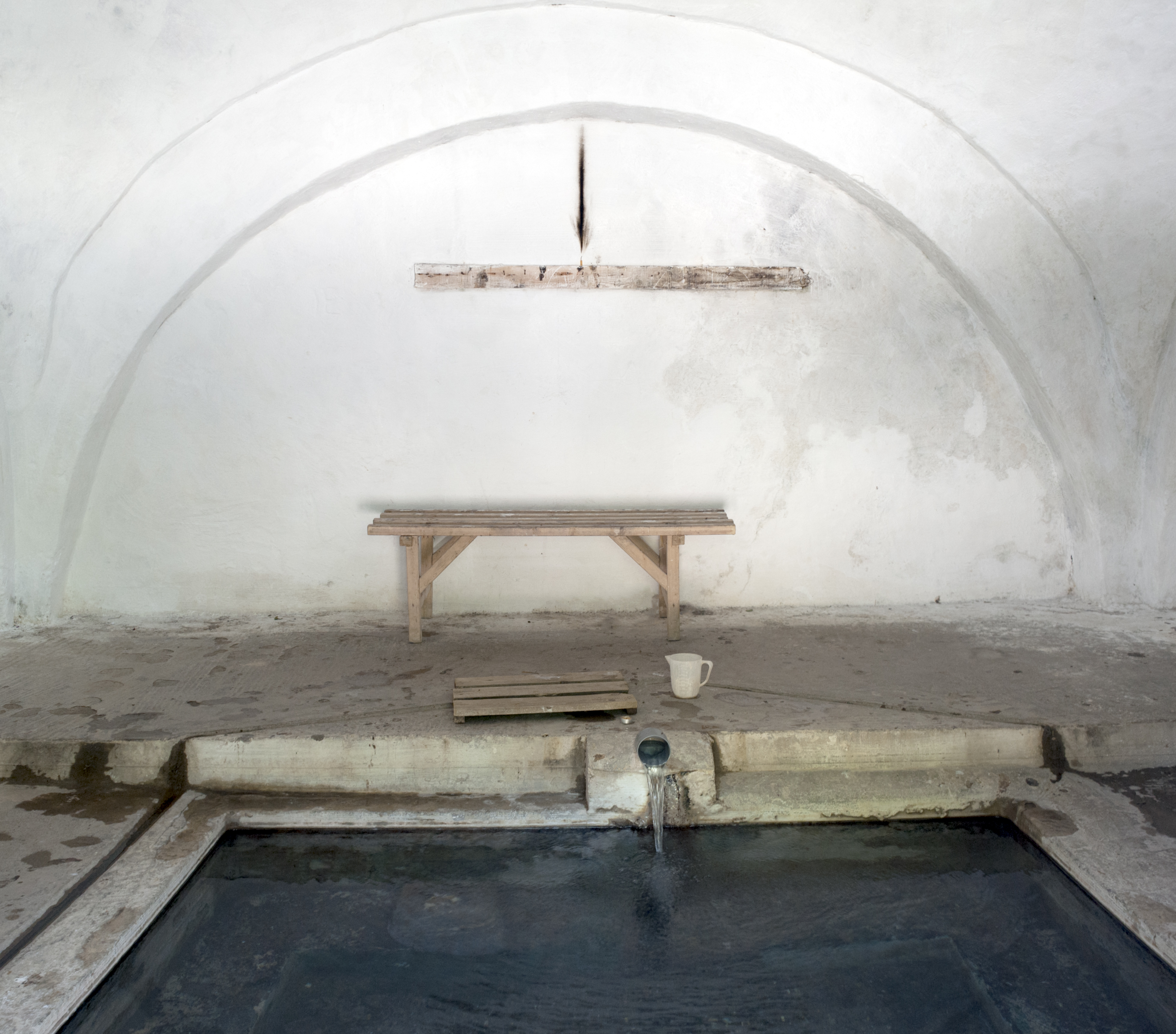
Hammam interior

== See also ==
- Seyyid Ali Sultan Tekke
- Ottoman Greece
- Hayriyye Madrasa
- Kütüklü Baba Tekke
- Oruç Pasha türbe
