= Votanikos =

Neighborhood in Athens, Greece

Votanikos Βοτανικός
- Neighborhood
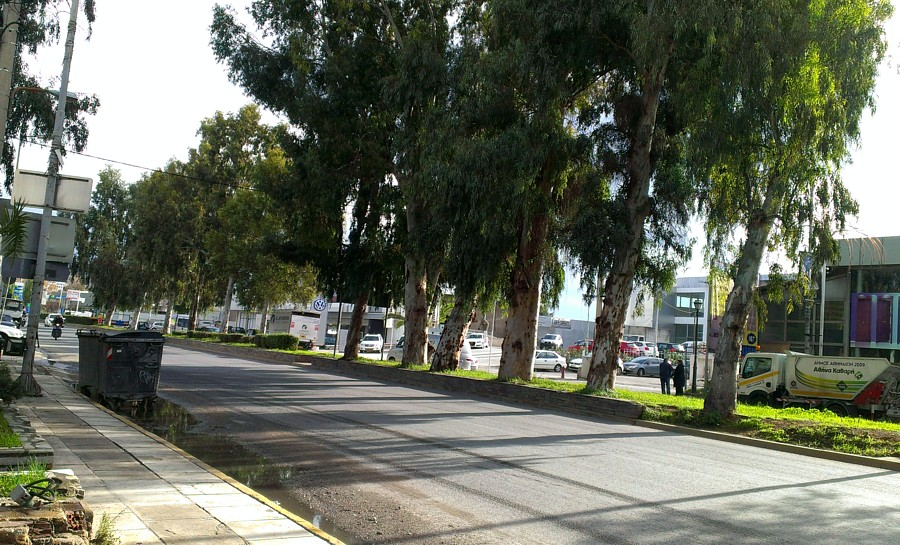
- Iera Odos in Votanikos

- Location within municipality of Athens
- Coordinates: 37°58′53″N 23°42′22″E
- Country: Greece
- Region: Attica
- City: Athens
- Postal code: 118 55
- Area code: 210
- Website: www.cityofathens.gr

Votanikos (Greek: Βοτανικός, pronounced [votaniˈkos]) is a neighborhood in Athens, Greece. The area is named after a nearby botanical garden situated to the southwest (Athens Botanical Gardens). The eastern part is residential; the western part is forested and industrialized. The subdivision has no squares but has a nearby school. Major streets bordering this subdivision include Patsi Street to the west, Athinon Avenue to the north, Konstantinopouleos Avenue and the rail to the south and Petrou Rally Avenue to the south. The Iera Odos runs in the middle. The population is between 5,000 and 6,000, and the area is about 0.5 km^{2}.

== Neighboring quarters ==
- Akadimia Platonos, north
- Profitis Daniil, northeast
- Asyrmatos, south
- Kato Petralona, south

== History ==
The area saw housing developments in the early part of the 20th century when Athens began to grow, as well as an industrial being added, the period after World War 2 and the Greek Civil War saw even taller buildings to be added.

== Panathinaikos Stadium ==
The area will be home to the largest football-specific stadium in Greece, which will have a capacity of 40,000 seats. The Votanikos Stadium will be surrounded by a large park and other Panathinaikos facilities.

== Athens Mosque ==
Athens' first purpose-built mosque in modern times is being built in Votanikos on a disused navy base under the direct order of former left-wing prime minister Alexis Tsipras. The mosque is approximately 1,000 square meters (3,300 square feet) with enough space for 300-400 worshipers.

== Residential streets ==
Here is a list of residential streets, several of which are named after places in Northern Greece as well as Pelagonia and Falaisias. Neighborhood streets run from NNW (330°) to SSE (150°) and from NNE (30°) to SSW (210°). This list excludes major streets which are mentioned on the top. There are 287 streets and avenues as well as one connector in this subdivision.

- Agias Markelas Street
- Agiou Orous Street
- Agistis Street
- Aimou Street
- Chalkidikis Street
- Doxatou Street
- Falaisias Street
- Flioudos Street
- Grevenon Street
- Karyon Street
- Kastorias Street
- Korytsas Street
- Naoussas Street
- Nevrokopiou Street
- Pangaio Street
- Pelagonias Street
- Pellis Street
- Profiti Daniil Street
- Rodopis Street
- Troizinas Street
- Volissou Street
- Vourbiani Street
