= Oruç Pasha Türbe =

Türbe in Didymoteicho, Greece

Coordinates: 41°20′59.6″N 26°29′53.2″E

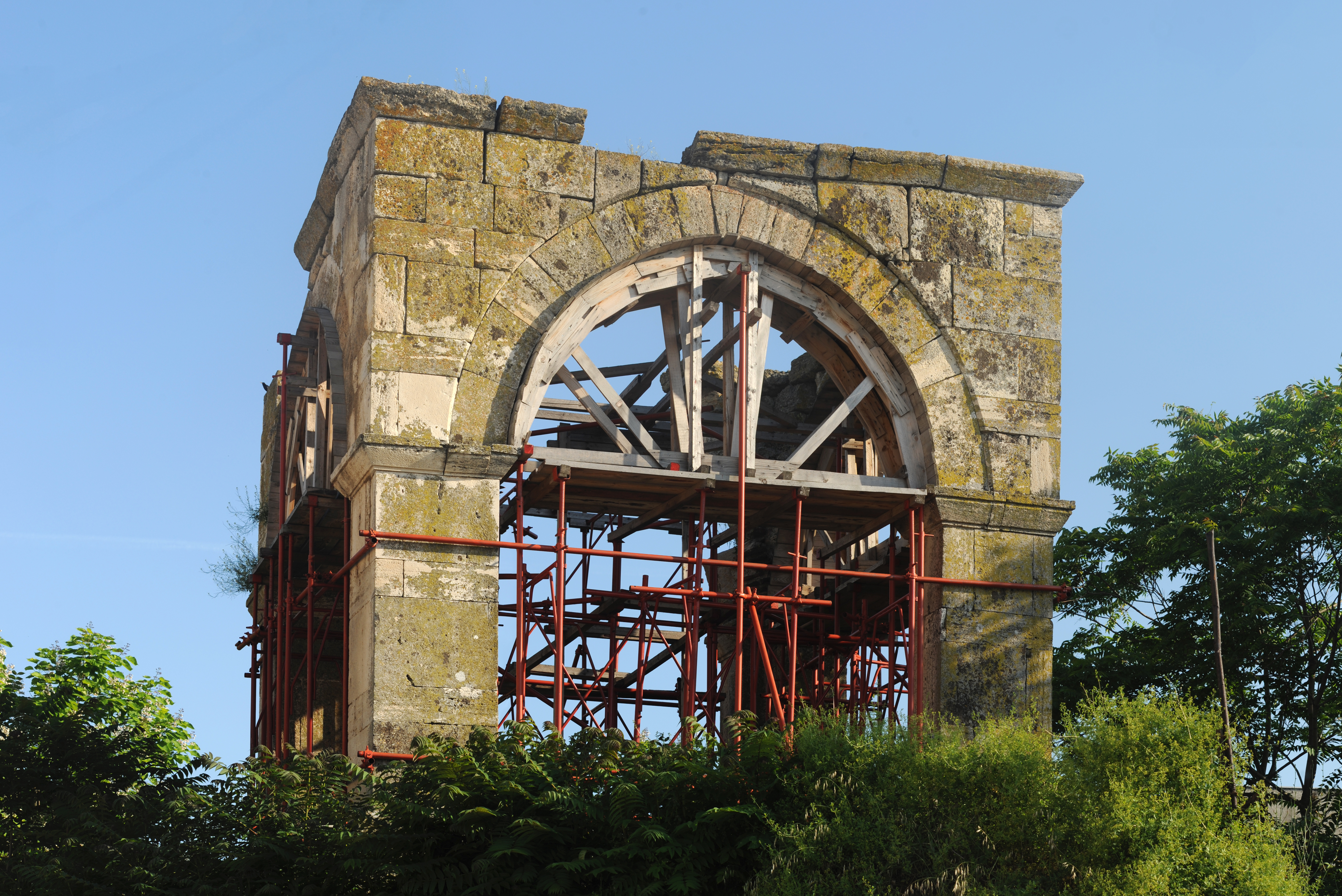
The türbe today.

The Oruç Pasha türbe also known locally as the Pyrostia (Greek: Πυροστιά) or the Tripod (Τρίποδας) is a türbe, or Ottoman mausoleum, of Oruç Pasha in the town of Didymoteicho, northerneast Greece, dating back to the fifteenth century. Oruç Pasha was a general and beylerbey of Anatolia under Sultan Murad II. He brought remarkable building activity to the city, today the homonymous hamams are preserved.

== Description ==
It is located behind Didymoteicho's Town Hall on the edge of a large Muslim cemetery. The name Pyrostia or Tripod is used by the local population and is due to a visual impression created by the monument at a certain angle.

It is an open-type türbe and consists of a podium with an arched chamber which in the past held a brick dome, which has now collapsed. In 1989, a man's skeleton split in two was found in a crypt. Being buried in such manner so that the body did not face the sun indicated that it was a Muslim tomb.

The monument is a perfect cube with a side size of 20 Byzantine cubits (28.6 cm each). In the dimensions and in the correlation of the building materials there is also the symmetry of Byzantine metrology. The building materials are interconnected with geometrical relationships such as the golden ratio and their sizes are linked to the Byzantine span. Specifically, the plinths are exactly 28.6 centimeters long (i.e. 1 Byzantine span).

== See also ==
- Seyyid Ali Sultan Tekke
- Polyanthos Bridge
- Budala Hodja Tekke
