= Bedesten of Thessaloniki =

Ottoman monument in Thessaloniki, Greece

Coordinates: 40.6366°N 22.9412°E

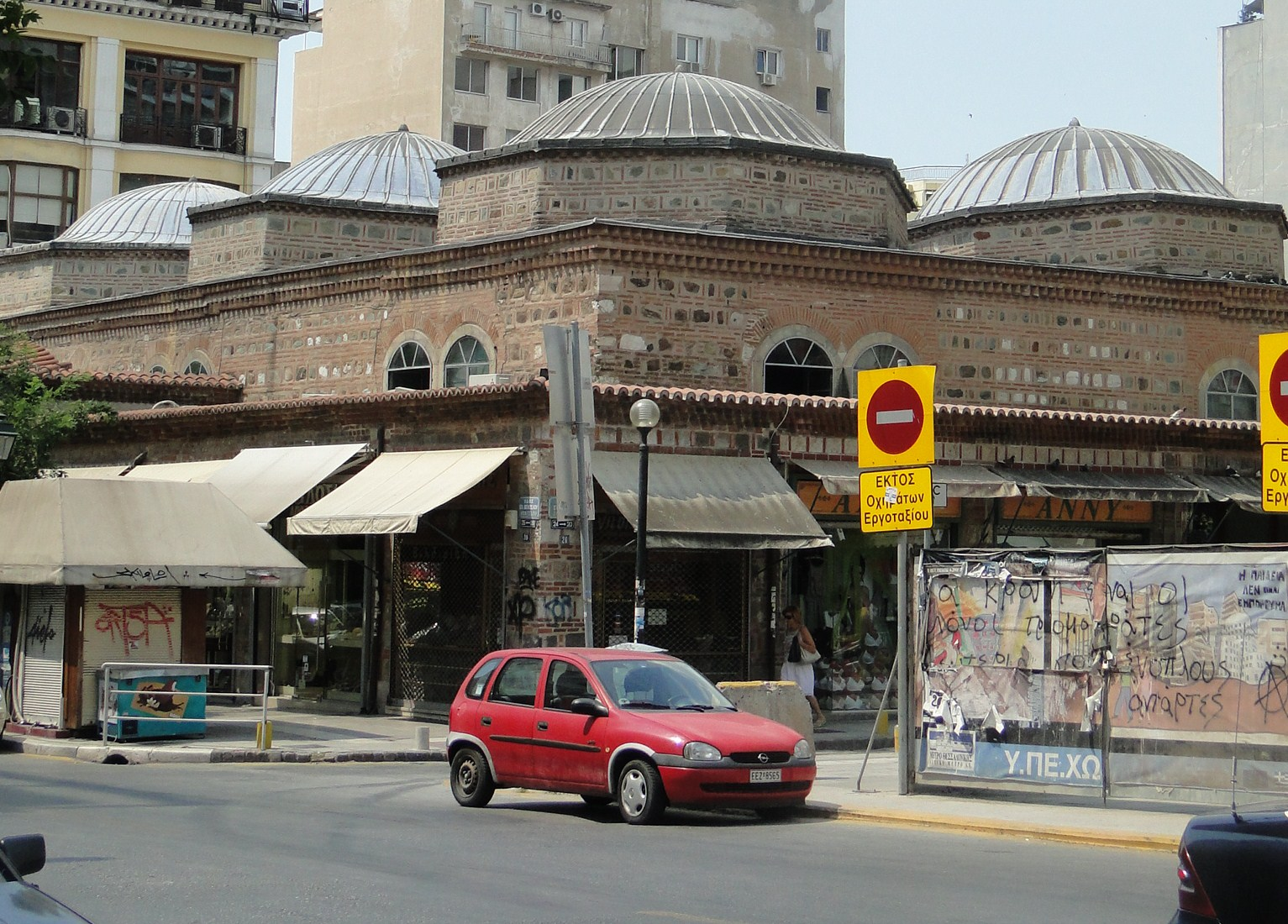
The bedesten today

The Bedesten of Thessaloniki (Greek: Μπεζεστένι Θεσσαλονίκης) is a historical Ottoman market in the city of Thessaloniki, Greece, built during the reign of Sultan Mehmed II (in around 1455–1459). It is located on Venizelou and Solomou streets, near the Hamza Bey Mosque and the city's old town hall. A bedesten is a type of Ottoman old market, and is derived from the Arabic word bez meaning fabric.

== History ==
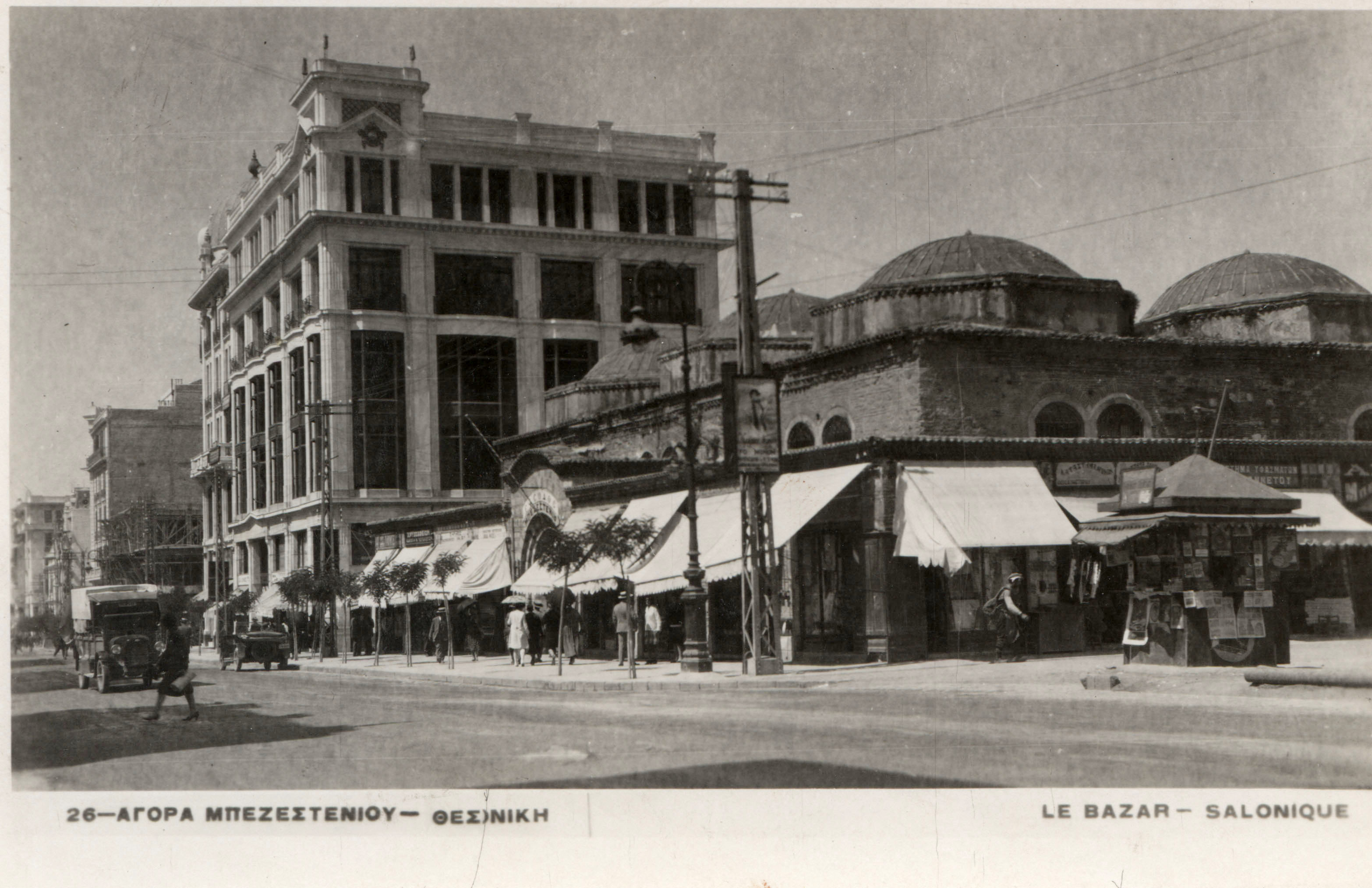
The bedesten on a postcard from about 1925–1930

According to some it was built by Mehmet II, between 1455 and 1459, while another theory is that it dates from the late fifteenth century or even early sixteenth instead.

The construction style of the bedesten is representative of the Ottoman architecture of the fifteenth century, also found in similar buildings in the Balkans. The bedestens was a typical and common feature of Ottoman cities and towns. In the bedestens various valuables were sold, documents and assets were kept, the quality of goods was checked, and currency rates were determined.

It is one of the three surviving Ottoman bedestens within the borders of modern Greece, the other two being one in Larissa and another in Serres.

== Architecture ==
The bedesten consists of a rectangular space with an entrance on each of its four sides. In the interior, it is divided into six quadrilateral rooms with seven double arches resting on two central piers. The building has six lead-covered domes. Before the fire of 1917, which destroyed most of the city, the bedesten of Thessaloniki housed one hundred and thirteen shops. After the fire, exterior shops were added around the perimeter of the central area.

During the 1980s and 1990s restoration works was carried out to fix the building, as it had suffered subsidence and deviation from the vertical axis. Today the bedesten houses various shops.

== See also ==
- Imaret of Komotini
- Alaca Imaret Mosque
- Lembet Mosque
- Las Incantadas
- Musa Baba türbe

== Bibliography ==
- Astreinidou-Kotsaki, Pelagia (1996). "Οικονομική λειτουργία των μπεζεστενίων στην αγορά της Οθωμανικής περιόδου". Μακεδονικά (30).
