= Islam in Greece =

Islam in Europe by percentage of country population 95–100%: Azerbaijan; 90–95%: Turkey; Kosovo; 50–70%: Albania; Bosnia and Herzegovina; Kazakhstan; 30–35%: North Macedonia; 10–20%: France; Sweden; Georgia; Montenegro; 5–10%: Austria; Belgium; Bulgaria; Denmark; Germany; Liechtenstein; Luxembourg; Netherlands; Russia; Switzerland; United Kingdom; Spain; Greece; 4–5%: Serbia; 2–4%: Italy; Finland; Norway; Malta; Slovenia; Cyprus (Note: Only takes into account the Muslim population residing on land controlled by the Republic of Cyprus.); 1–2%: Croatia; Ireland; Ukraine; Andorra; < 1%: Iceland; Armenia; Belarus; Czech Republic; Estonia; Hungary; Latvia; Lithuania; Moldova; Monaco; Poland; Portugal; Romania; San Marino; Slovakia

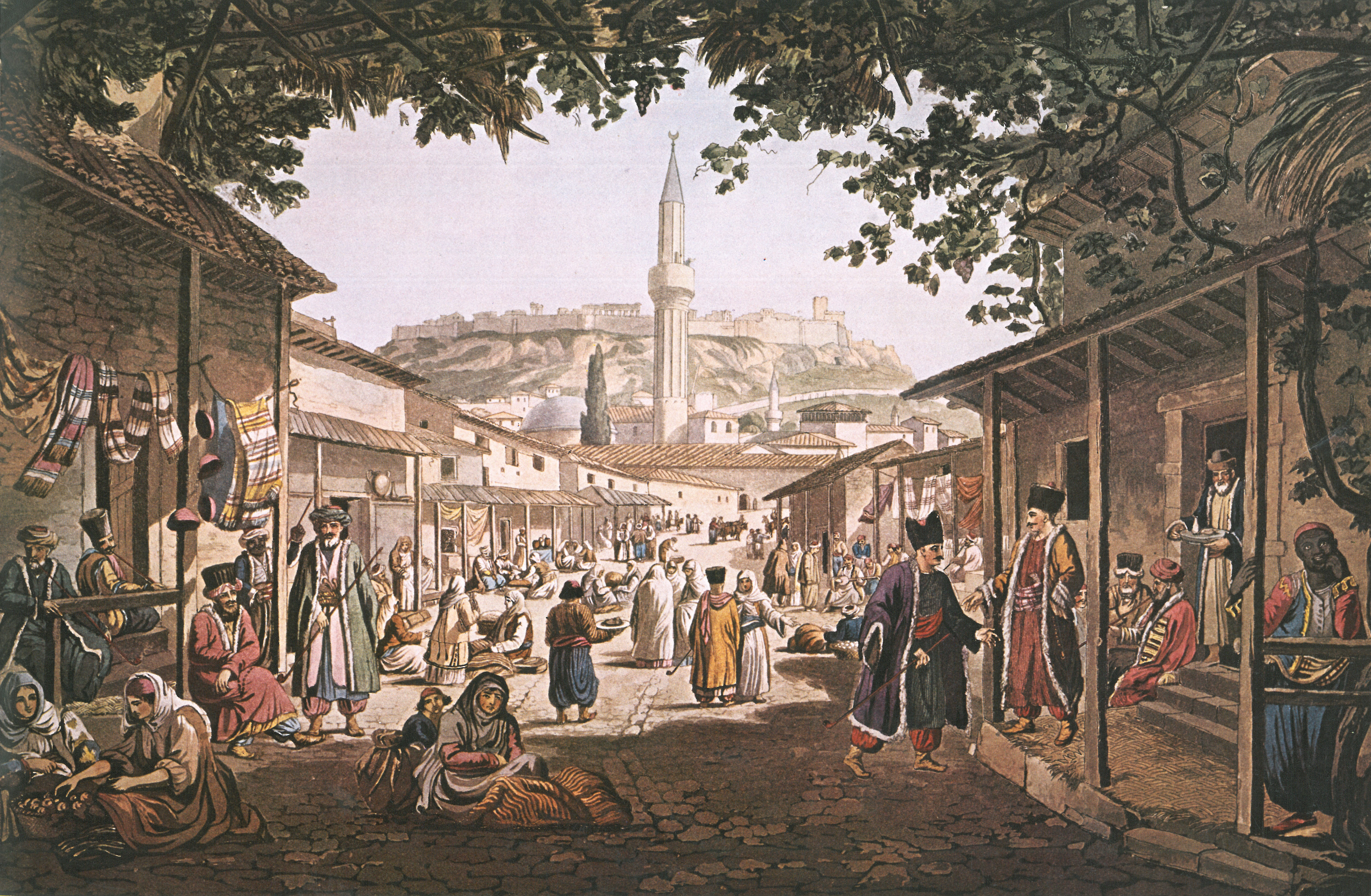
Bazaar at Athens, Edward Dodwell.

Islam in Greece is represented by two distinct communities; Muslims that have lived in Greece since the times of the Ottoman Empire (primarily in East Macedonia and Thrace) and Muslim immigrants that began arriving in the last quarter of the 20th century, mainly in Athens and Thessaloniki. Today, Muslims in Greece are mainly immigrants from West Asia (Syria, Iraq, Iran, Palestine), other Balkan regions (Turkey, Albania), South Asia (Afghanistan, Pakistan), and North Africa (Morocco, Algeria, Libya, Egypt).

== Local Muslims in Greece ==
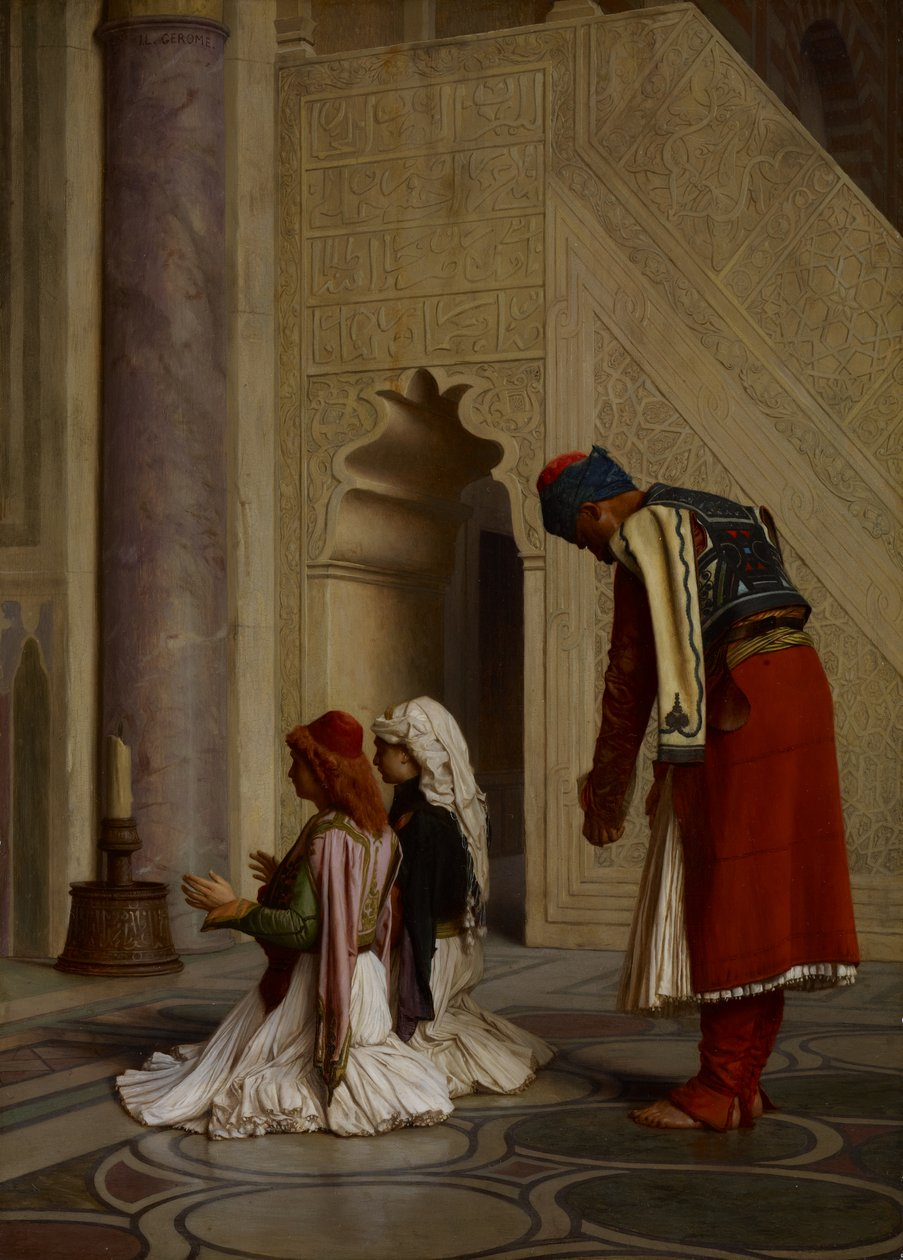
Young Greeks at the Mosque (Jean-Léon Gérôme, oil on canvas, 1865); this oil painting portrays Greek Muslims at prayer in a mosque.

The Muslim population in Greece is not homogeneous, since it consists of different ethnic, linguistic, and social backgrounds which often overlap. The Muslim faith is the creed of several ethnic groups living in the present territory of Greece, namely the Pomaks, ethnic Turks, certain Romani groups, and Greek Muslims particularly of Crete, Epirus, and western Greek Macedonia who converted mainly in the 17th and 18th centuries. The country's Muslim population decreased significantly as a result of the 1923 population exchange agreement between Greece and the new Turkish Republic, which also uprooted approximately 1.5 million Greeks from Asia Minor. Many of the Muslims of Northern Greece were actually ethnic Greek Muslims from Epirus and Greek Macedonia, whereas the Muslims of Pomak and ethnic Turkish origin (the Western Thrace Turks) from Western Thrace were exempt from the terms of the population exchange. Successive Greek governments and officials consider the Turkish-speaking Muslims of Western Thrace as part of the Greek Muslim minority and not as a separate Turkish minority. This policy is aimed to give the impression that the Muslims of the region are the descendants of Ottoman-era ethnic Greek converts to Islam like the Vallahades of pre-1923 Greek Macedonia and so thereby avoid a possible future situation in which Western Thrace is ceded to Turkey on the basis of the ethnic origin of its Muslim inhabitants.

The term Muslim minority (Μουσουλμανική μειονότητα Musulmanikí mionótita) refers to an Islamic religious, linguistic and ethnic minority in western Thrace, which is part of the Greek administrative region of East Macedonia and Thrace. In 1923, under the terms of the Treaty of Lausanne, the Greek Muslims of Epirus, Greek Macedonia, and elsewhere in mainly Northern Greece were required to immigrate to Turkey; whereas, the Christians living in Turkey were required to immigrate to Greece in an "Exchange of Populations". The Muslims of western Thrace and the Christians of Istanbul and the islands of Gökçeada and Bozcaada (Imvros and Tenedos) were the only populations not exchanged. For more information on this community, see Muslim minority of Greece.

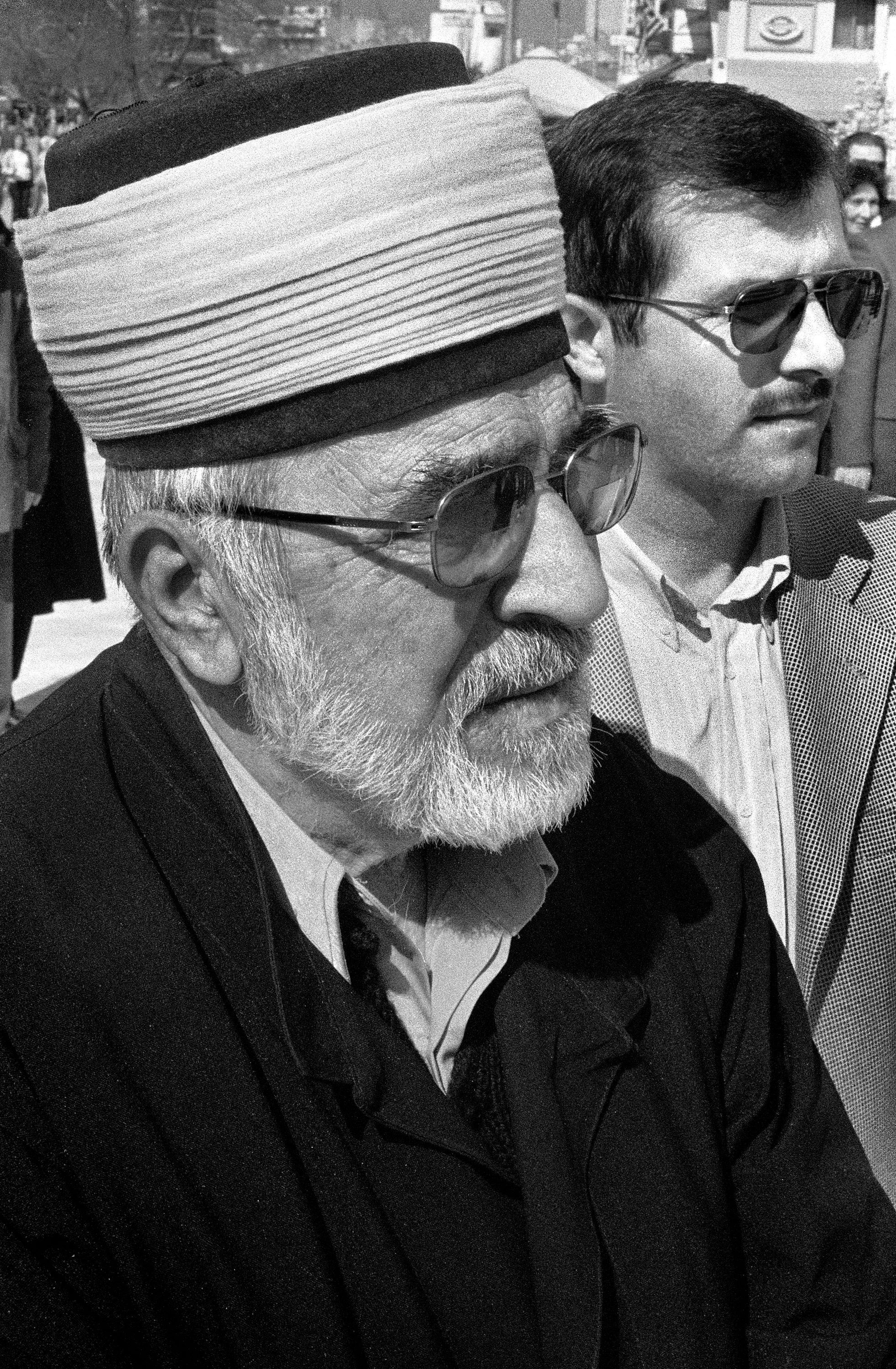
Meco Cemali, the mufti of Komotini on Greek Independence Day

There is also a small Muslim community in some of the Dodecanese islands (Turks of the Dodecanese) which, as part of the Italian Dodecanese of the Kingdom of Italy between 1911 and 1947, were not subjected to the exchange of the population between Turkey and Greece in 1923. They number about 3,000, some of whom espouse a Turkish identity and speak Turkish, while others are the Greek-speaking descendants of Cretan Muslims. The community is strongest in the city of Rhodes and on the island of Kos (in particular the village of Platanos).

The Pomaks are mainly located in compact villages in Western Thrace's Rhodope Mountains. While the Greek Roma community is predominantly Greek Orthodox, the Roma in Thrace are mainly Muslim.

Estimates of the recognized Muslim minority, which is mostly located in Thrace, range from 98,000 to 140,000 (between 0.9% and 1.2%)., predominantly in the area of Asea Albanian immigrants to Greece are usually associated with the Muslim faith, although most are secular in orientation.

== Immigrant Muslims in Greece ==
The first immigrants of Islamic faith, mostly Egyptians, arrived in the early 1950s from Egypt, and are concentrated in the country's two main urban centres, Athens and Thessaloniki. Since 1990, there has been a large increase in the numbers of immigrant Muslims from various countries of the Middle East, North Africa, as well as from Afghanistan, Pakistan, India, Bangladesh, Somalia and Muslim Southeast Asia. However, the bulk of the immigrant Muslim community has come from the Balkan states, specifically from Albania, Albanian communities in North Macedonia, and other former Yugoslav republics. Since the collapse of the Warsaw Pact in Eastern Europe in the early 1990s, Albanian workers started immigrating to Greece, taking low wage jobs in search of economic opportunity, and bringing over their families to settle in cities like Athens and Thessaloniki.

The majority of the immigrant Muslim community resides in Athens. In recognition of their religious rights, the Greek government approved the building of a mosque in July 2006. In addition, the Greek Orthodox Church has donated 300,000 square feet (28,000 m^{2}), worth an estimated $20 million, in west Athens for the purpose of a Muslim cemetery. Greece's government gave the green light to begin construction in 2016, but both commitments continued to remain dead letters by 2017. However, Kostas Gavroglou – Greece's education and religious minister from 2016 to July 2019 – said that the country's first state-sponsored mosque was likely to begin operations in September 2019. Still, the country faces strong opposition from some of its citizens, who consider mosques to be a means of spreading Islam in Europe. Though the construction and operation of this Athenian mosque was within legal regulations, the strong ideological spread of the Greeks will likely perpetuate the controversy. If the mosque is built, it will end an almost two-century wait.

For prayers that are required to be performed in congregation, the Thessaloniki Muslim community meets inside apartments, basements, and garages for worship. In addition, there are very few Muslim cemeteries – forcing some to travel hundreds of kilometres to bury their dead.

In 2010, an unofficial mosque on the island of Crete was targeted in the night without any casualties, likely as a result of anti-Muslim sentiments in the Greek far-right, but no suspects had been identified. There has been anti-Muslim rhetoric from certain right-wing circles, including the Golden Dawn party. A survey published in 2019 by the Pew Research Center found that 37% of Greeks had a favorable view of Muslims, whereas 57% had an unfavourable view.

== Conversion to Christianity ==
There are two groups who have converted in large numbers from Islam to Christianity. The first group are the Turks of the Dodecanese. Being seen as a remnant of the former Ottoman Empire and culturally similar to the country of Turkey, many Turks do not show interest in the Islamic faith in order not to face discrimination by the Greek state.

The second case are the Albanian immigrants who have shown a preference for rapid assimilation into Greek culture. They form the largest migrant group in Greece, and the majority do not want to be identified as Albanian. Many Albanian newcomers change their Albanian name to Greek ones and their religion from Islam to Orthodoxy: Even before emigration, many Muslim people in southern Albania presented themselves as Greeks and adopted Greek names instead of Albanian Muslim ones in order to avoid discrimination before immigrating. As such, they seek to increase their chances to get a Greek visa and work in Greece. After migrating to Greece, they get baptized and change their Muslim or Albanian names in their passports to Greek ones.

== Application of Islamic law in Greece ==
In Greece, Islamic law can be applied in two different situations. One of the two, like in many other countries, is used in the case of private international law when the utilization of a foreign law controlling family relations that may be religious is used due to conflict rules. The second case refers to Greece only, as the only country in the European Union with Islamic religious courts. There have been many international conventions between Greece and Turkey starting in 1881, which have dealt with the Greek minority in Turkey and the Turkish minority in Greece. Consequently, the Mufti, as a religious leader of all the Muslims in Greece, was given power by law to make decisions regarding the personal status of the Muslim minority. This was still the case in Western Thrace, in the northeast of Greece, until 2018, when the laws were largely limited. Even though this law is restricted to only about 120,000 Greek citizens, which represent this minority, the law can be viewed as a certain section of the national Greek legal system.

The Sharia law used to be mandatory among the Muslim citizens of Greece, a situation that stems from the Ottoman era and predates its reinforcement by the 1923 Lausanne Treaty. The mandatory applicability of Sharia law came into international spotlight when a woman from Komotini named Chatize Molla Sali lodged a complaint to the European Court of Human Rights (ECHR) and that is when the law came into the spotlight. She went against Greece due to a dispute over inheritance rights with the sisters of the deceased husband. After her appeal was accepted by the secular justice system of Greece, her win was overruled by the Supreme Court, stating that no one other than a Mufti has the competency to decide on the issues related to inheritance in the Muslim community. The ECHR found unanimously that the mandatory application of Sharia law on the Muslim minority was a violation of the European Convention on Human Rights, particularly Article 14 (prohibition of discrimination), by Greece. In 2018, the applicability of Sharia law in Greece was restricted to cases where all the parties accept its jurisprudence, therefore it can no longer be forced upon people against their will.

=== History ===
Ali Sami Bey, a former Ottoman naval officer who fought for Greece during the Greco-Turkish War (1919–1922), leading a militia and attaining the rank of colonel. He was one of few Ottoman Muslims speaking out against the Armenian genocide and the Greek genocide as late as 1922. He was personally exempted from the 1923 population exchange between Greece and Turkey.

Greece and Turkey signed the Convention of Istanbul in 1881, which was the first groundwork for the Islamic religious courts. As the Ottoman Empire was slowly losing its European territories, it lost most of Thessaly, which is central Greece today, due to this convention. On the other hand, this convention provided the remaining Muslim population with a set of rights, which allowed them freedom of religion and the survival of Muslim religious courts, which were to keep their legitimacy and make decisions on issues related to religion. Those issues often refer to family and succession law, which fall under the personal status. At the end of the first Balkan war in 1913, Greece and Turkey signed the Athens Treaty of Peace. Greece has conquered new areas, primarily Macedonia and Epirus, and pushed Turkey further away, which left many Turks and other Muslims in Greece's new territories. This new convention protected them and it gave power to the Mufti over laws regarding family and succession among the Muslim population. Some of the laws that were passed in order to enforce these Conventions were later repealed; others have stayed in force, but the laws that were introduced after the most important convention have been limited only recently in 2018. The Convention of Lausanne in 1923, applied to entire Greece except for the Dodecanese islands. Greece and Turkey signed the convention, agreeing that all of the issues related to the personal status of minorities should be dealt with according to religious law and not the civil one. Religious courts were not addressed in this convention, but it left room for the possibility of future different regulations of these questions. This was deemed possible only in case a special commission is formed in order to represent the minority and make decisions. In 1926 this happened in Turkey as it repealed the role of the religious law. Minorities agreed to annul their previous special status and be subject to the new The Turkish Civil Code. Greek authorities, on the other hand, have waited for a long time to consider changing laws that address Muslim family matter until 2018, fearful that Turkey would call for amendments to the Lausanne Treaty.

=== Sharia in Western Thrace ===
Muftis make decisions on various questions in accordance with Sharia law as the Islamic legal system primarily based on the Qur’an and Islamic tradition. How Sharia law is interpreted and applied depends on Islamic legal schools of thought and they are often very different from one another. The Muslims of Western Thrace are far from homogenous and vary both ethnically and religiously. Half of these Muslims are of Turkish origin followed by Pomaks and Roma, and the vast majority professes Sunni Islam, while around 10% are from the Sufi Bektashi order. Despite these differences among this Muslim minority of Greece, they all seem to mostly agree on the important aspects of Islamic law regarding their personal status, which is namely considered to be Hanafi law as it was in the Ottoman Empire. There are, on the other hand, areas of conflict between the basis of Sharia family law and both Greek and international legal systems. One of the two areas is the principle of equality of the sexes; Islamic laws that deal with divorce and polygamy prove the unequal treatment of the sexes. The other is the concern for the best interest of the child; there are rules in Islamic law that clash with the rights of the child as guaranteed by the UN Convention that addressed the marriage of minors and child custody.

There were two schools of thought regarding the employment of Islamic law on Muslim communities in Greece. The first and the widespread one states that Sharia law should be applied only to the Muslim community in the Western Thrace region and that other Muslims across Greece (including those on Dodecanese islands) should be under the jurisdiction of the Greek Civil Code, which took effect in 1946. According to the second one, Islamic law should be applied to all Muslims in Greece, regardless of the region in which they live, which is what the Supreme Court held in 1980. It asserted that Mufti being a judge is legally consistent with a concept of a ‘’natural judge’’. In one case after a divorce, when the woman applied for alimony for her child and herself, the jurisdiction was given to the Mufti from Xanthi in Western Thrace because the ex-spouses were Muslims, despite the fact they were both from Athens. In another more recent case of 2007, the Supreme Court proclaimed that Muftis had many issues involving Muslims within their purview, given that Sharia law covers them. Some of them were marriage, divorce, alimony, inheritance, different issues regarding minors, and others.

The applicability of Sharia law was restricted in 2018, when a law was passed eliminating the mandatory enforcement of the Sharia Law, and limiting its powers, making it optional, and restricted to cases when all parties accept its jurisprudence.

=== Molla Sali v. Greece ===
The aforementioned Greek citizen called Chatitze (or Hatijah) Molla Sali lived in Komotini, a city located in North-Eastern Greece in the region of ‘East Macedonia and Thrace’. Her deceased husband was also a Greek citizen and he was associated with the Muslim minority of Thrace. After the husband's death, Molla Sali was entitled to the entirety of his property, including estates in Istanbul and Komotini. The deceased husband had written a testament according to the Greek Civil Law, in which he leaves everything to his wife. However, based on their brother being a member of the Muslim community, the late husband's sisters decided to litigate. They argued that issues related to the inheritance of property were subject to Islamic and not civil law and that the Mufti was the one who would look into the matter. This would have given the opportunity to other members of the family to claim parts of the deceased's property. At first, the court disapproved of sister's claims and in 2011 after an appeal, the court stood by its decision on the grounds that the deceased had written a will, which should be respected as his statutory right as a Greek citizen. Then on 7 October 2013, the judgment was annulled by the Court of Cassation, stating that these kinds of issues related to inheritance should be dealt with within the community and by the Mufti according to Islamic law. Even though the case was remitted afterward, nothing has changed and Molla Sali's appeal got rejected. Because of this outcome, Molla Sali was set to lose three-quarters of the property bestowed to her by her late husband. Finally, she appealed to the ECHR complaining about the application of Islamic law to her case, emphasizing that her husband's testament was written in accordance with the Greek Civil Code, which drew a lot of attention outside of Greece. The ECHR in its 2018 ruling, found unanimously that the mandatory application of Sharia law on the Muslim minority to be a violation of the European Convention on Human Rights, particularly Article 14 (prohibition of discrimination), by Greece.

The Molla Sali v. Greece case raised many questions regarding basic human rights. Even though the case narrowly connected to inheritance rights, many other general issues were raised because of it. The focus was put both on an individual and his or her right, and also on the position of Sharia law within the countries with a Muslim minority and within a broader European legal network and the ECHR. According to McGoldrick, some of the specific issues raised were: "(i) the relationship between religious and secular law; (ii) the compatibility of Sharia with contemporary-modern human rights standards... ; (iii) the relationship between the individual rights in the ECHR and another human rights treaty which, at least arguably, had as one of its objectives, protecting the minority rights of a group as such; (iv) the nature of minority rights in terms of whether they are mandatory or optional... ; (v) the relationship between individual and group rights... ; (vi) the relationship between religious autonomy and individual equality, and within the latter, gender equality; (vii) the application and interpretation of ECHR non-discrimination obligations in a religious minority protection context."

== Gallery ==
Islam in Greece

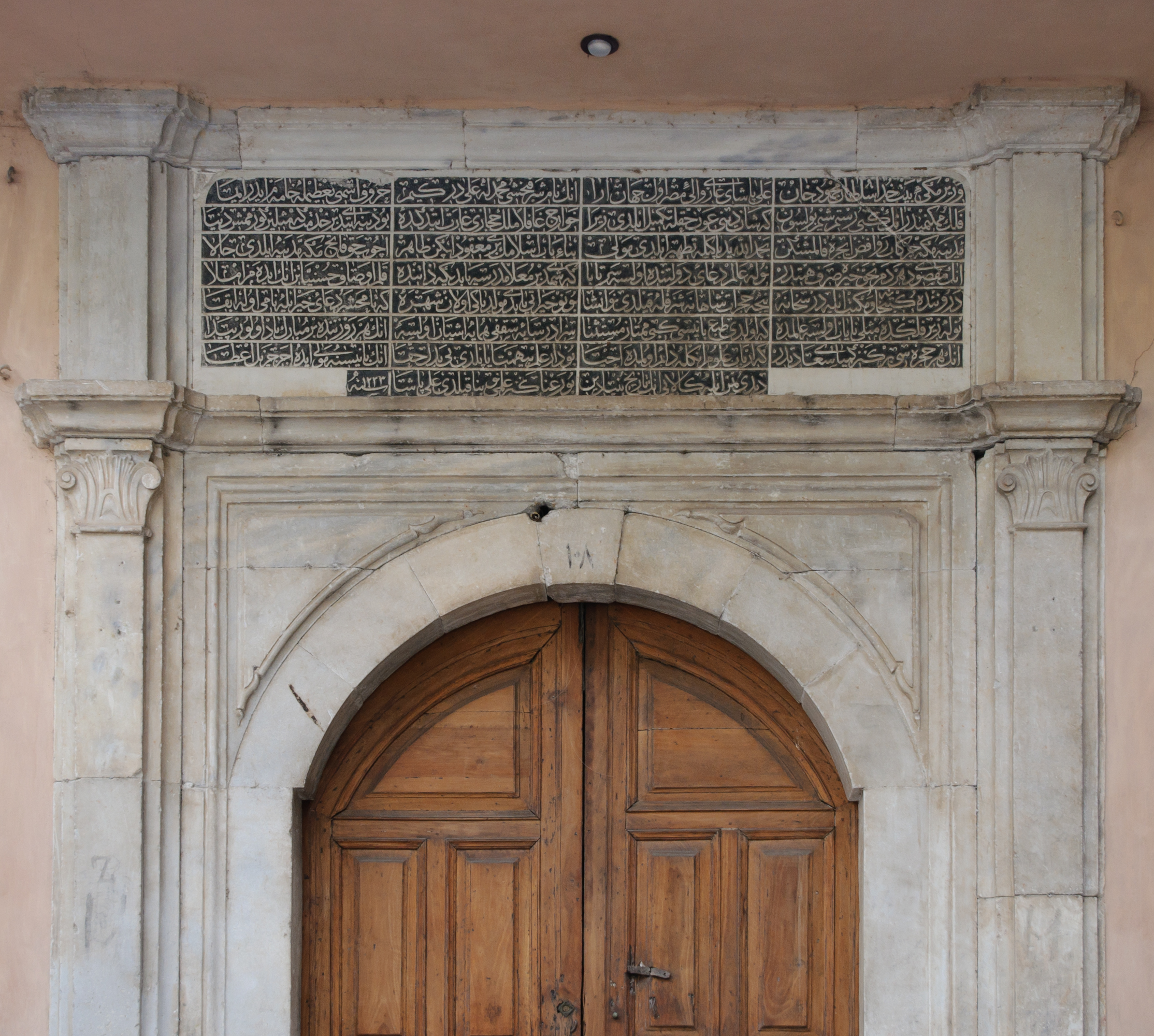
Imaret gate in Kavala with a dedication in Ottoman Turkish. Discernible are the names of Sultan Mahmud II, Ali Pasha (Muhammad Ali of Egypt, a native of Kavala), and the Islamic year 1233 corresponding to AD 1817.

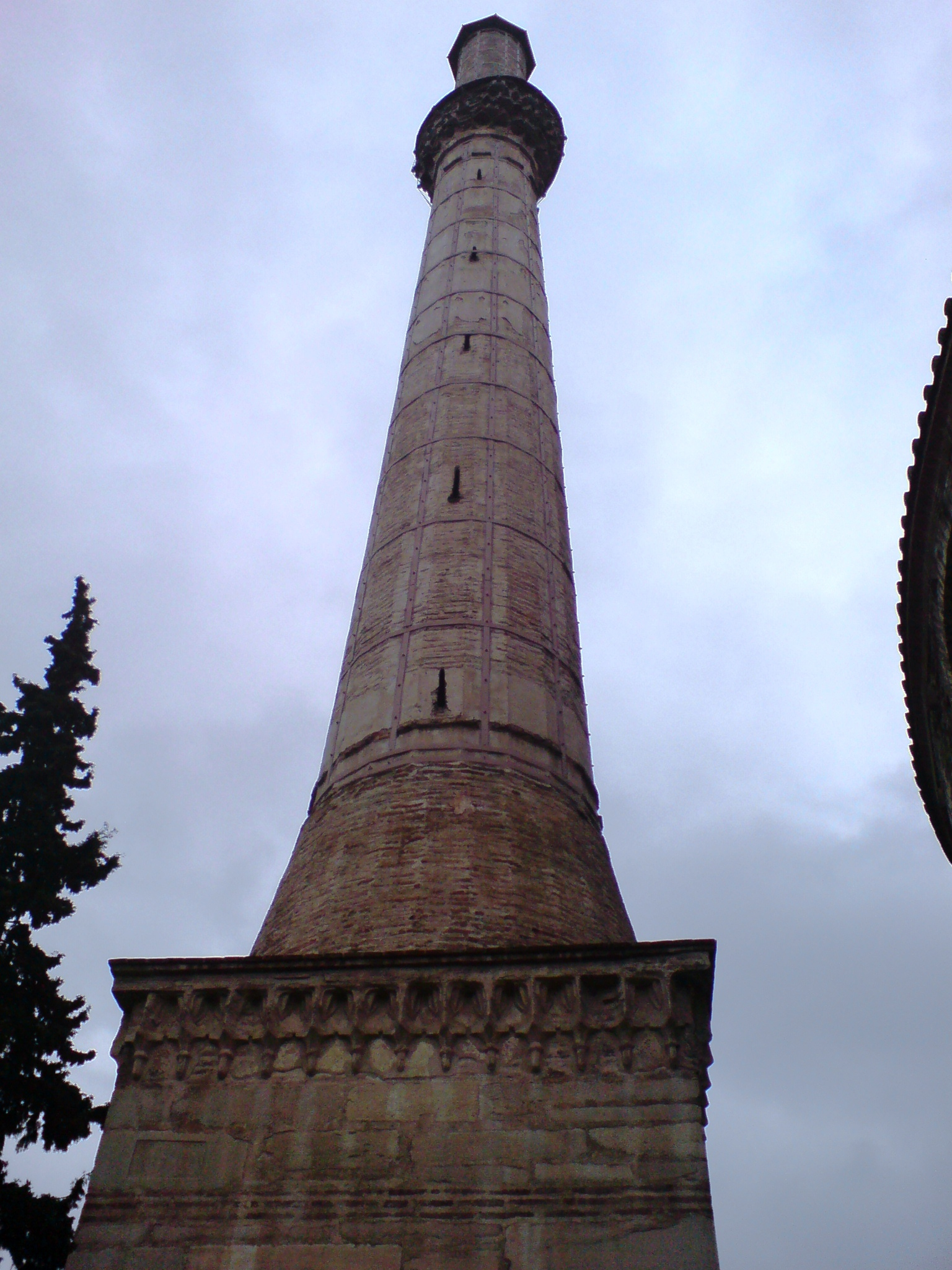
Minaret next to the Rotunda of Salonika. During the Ottoman period, the Rotunda was used as a mosque.

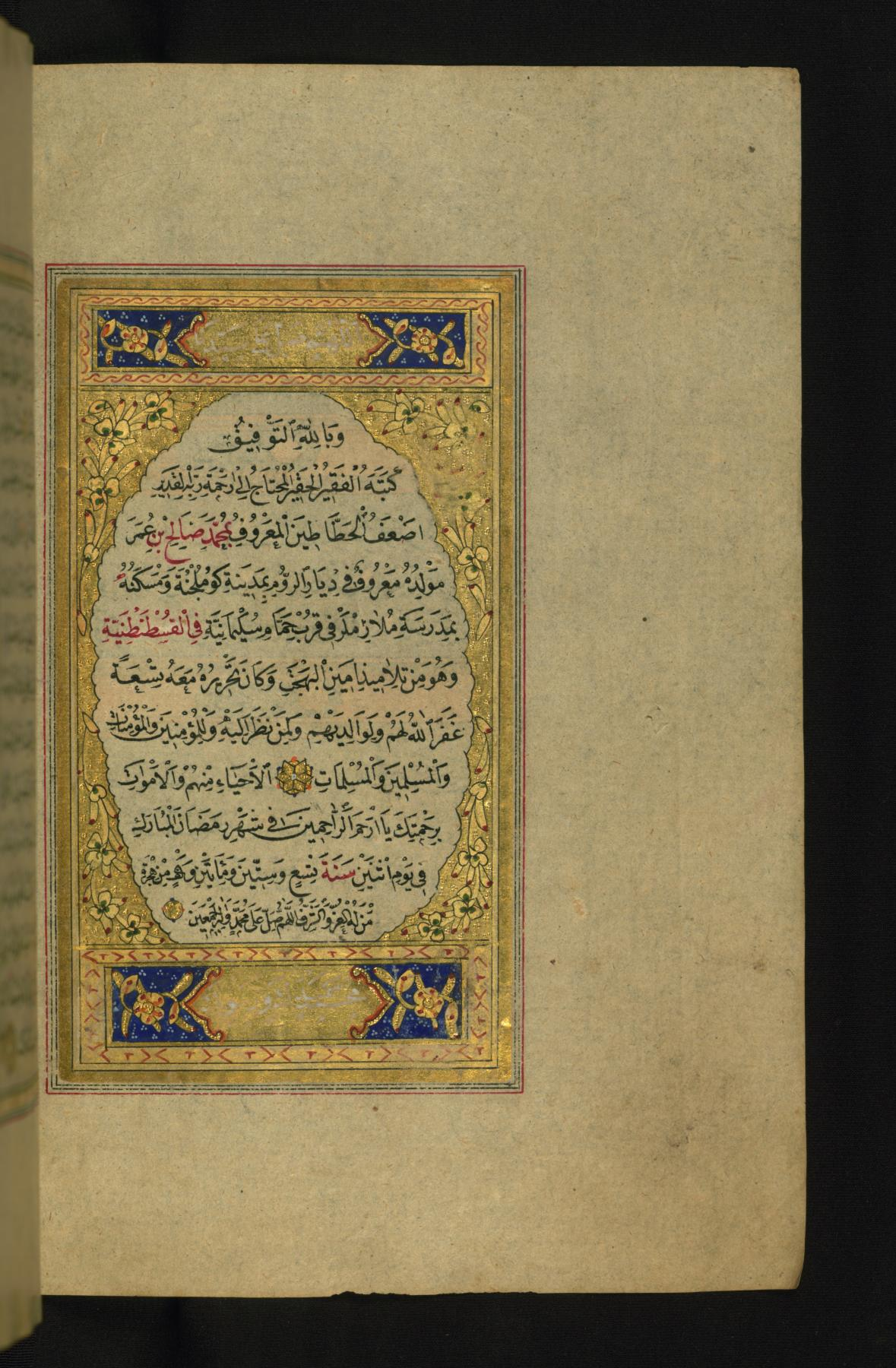
Illuminated colophon from 1269 AH/1853 AH, in Arabic. The author, one Muhammad Salih bin Umar, states that he was born in "Kumuljunah" (Gümülcine, today Komotini in Western Thrace).

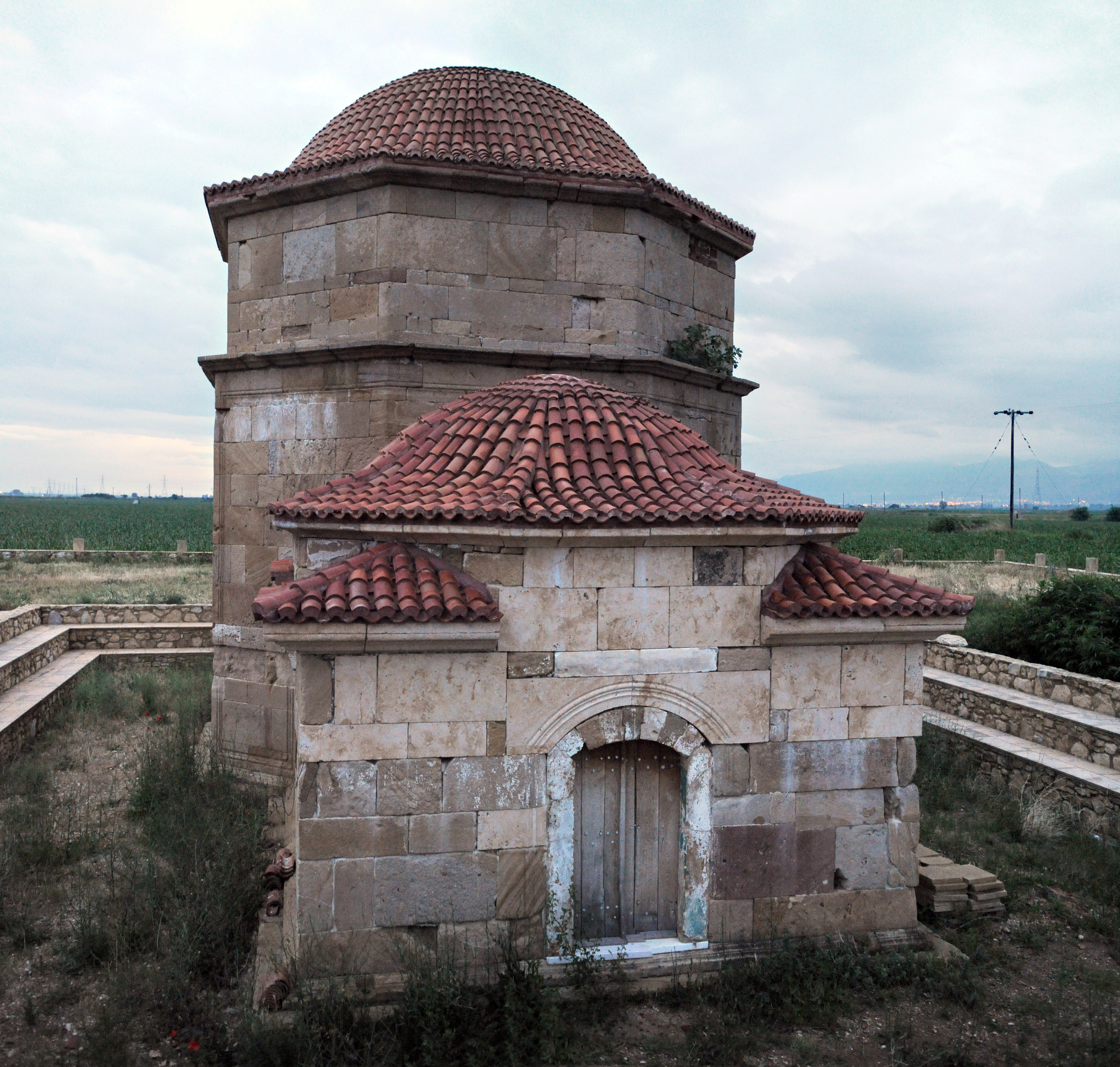
Shrine of Kütüklü Baba, a member of the Bektashi Order, in Selino, Rhodope, West Thrace, Greece.

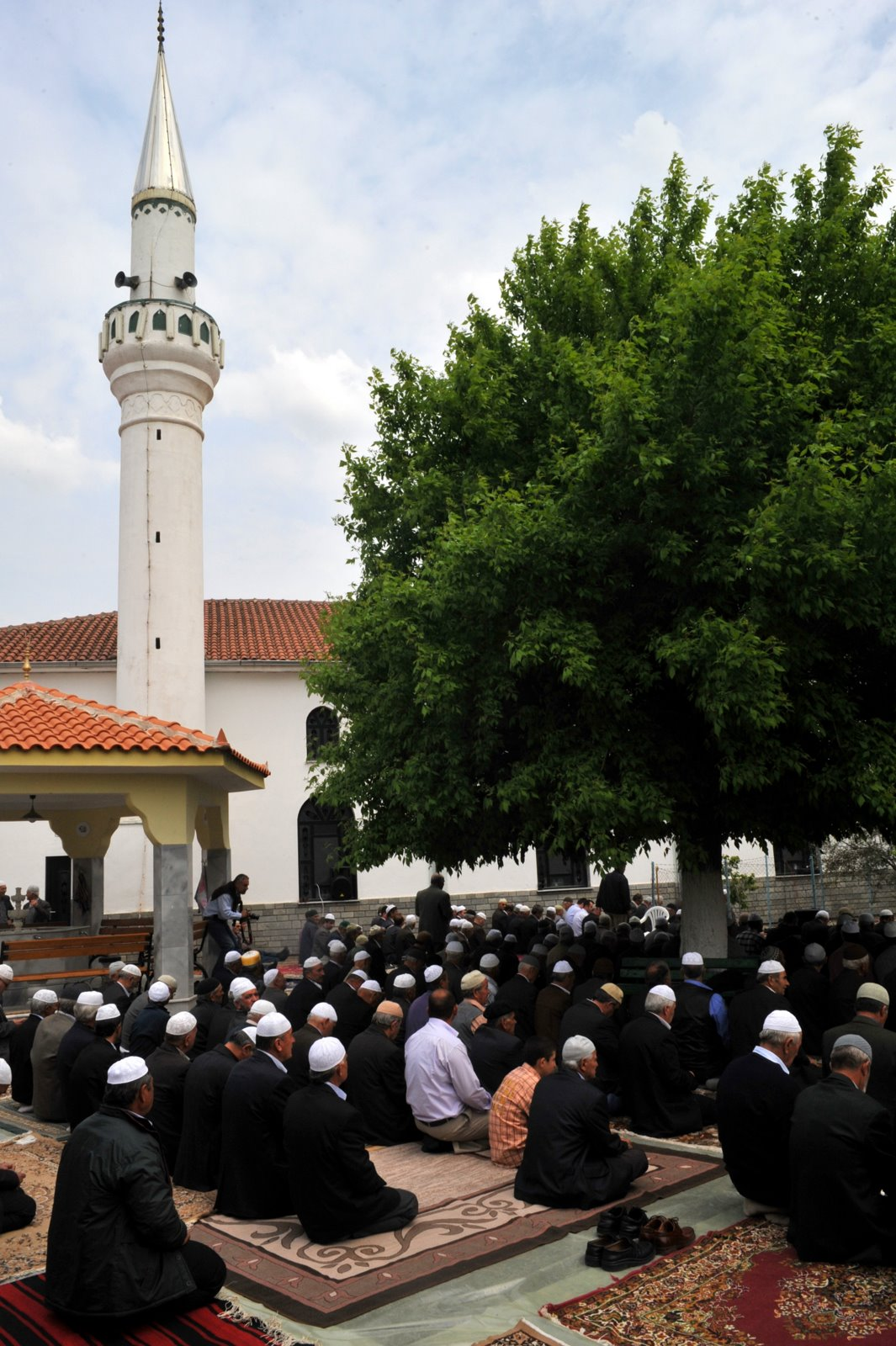
Mosque in Fillyra, Greece

Muslim woman of Salonika, from Les costumes populaires de la Turquie en 1873, published under the patronage of the Ottoman Imperial Commission for the 1873 Vienna World's Fair

== History ==
Muslims have lived within the borders of modern Greece since the Emirate of Crete era (824-961). These earliest followers of Islam were either killed, enslaved or converted to Christianity by missionaries such as Nikon the Metanoeite. Their settlements, mosques and walls were torn down after the Byzantine reconquest of Crete in 961 AD.

- Arab–Byzantine wars
- Byzantine–Seljuq wars
- Byzantine–Ottoman wars
- Ottoman Greece
- Greek War of Independence

== See also ==
- List of mosques in Greece
- List of former mosques in Greece
- List of mosques in Europe
- Islam by country
- Religion in Greece
- Muslim minority of Greece
- Turks of Western Thrace
