= Votanikos Mosque =

Mosque in Votanikos, Athens, Greece

Votanikos Mosque (Mosque of Athens)
- Τζαμί της Αθήνας
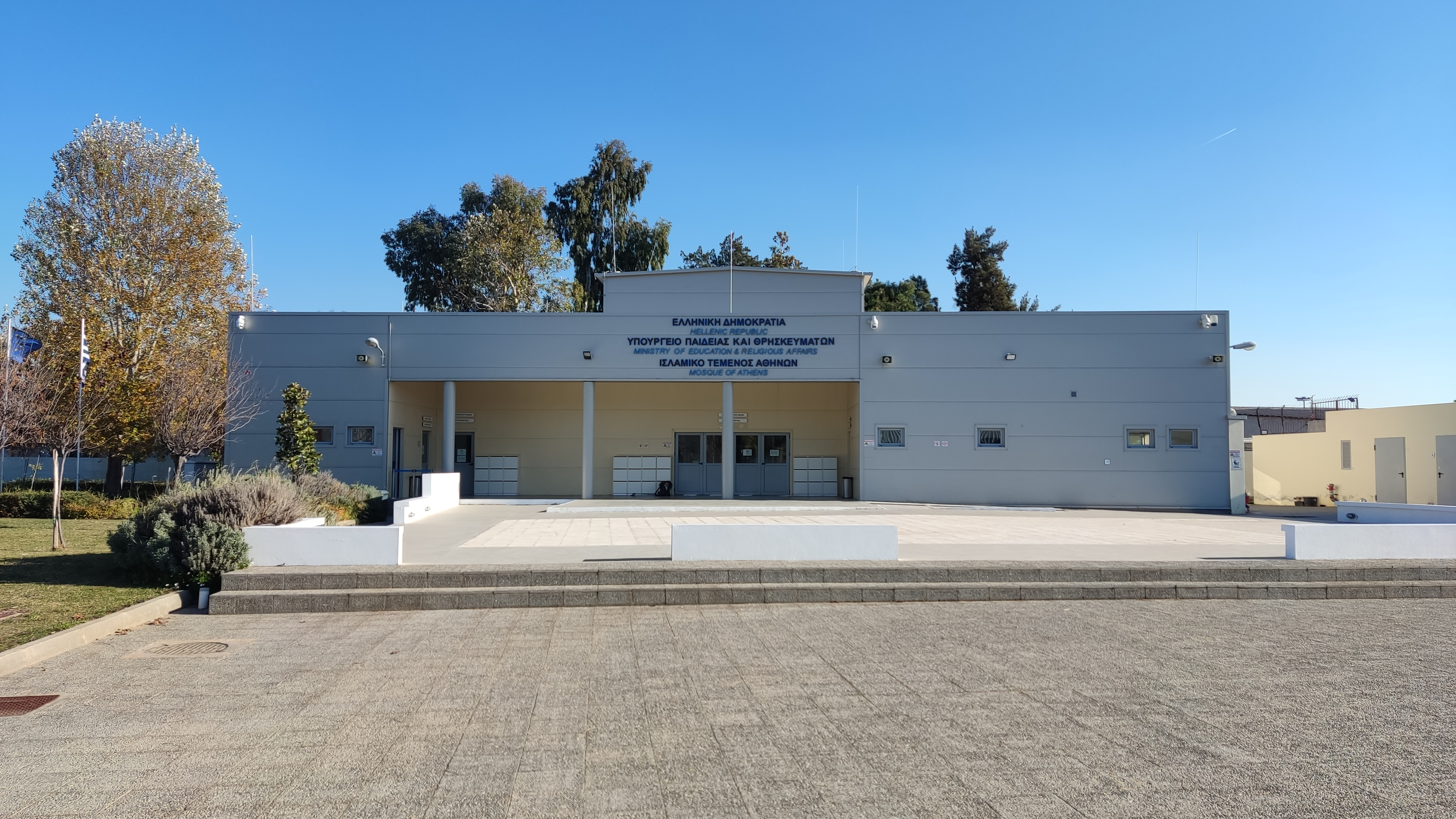

- Location within Athens

Religion
- Affiliation: Islam
- Ecclesiastical or organisational status: Mosque
- Ownership: Government of Greece
- Leadership: Zaki Mohammed (imam)
- Status: Active

Location
- Location: 144 Iera Odos, Votanikos, Athens
- Country: Greece
- Interactive map of Votanikos Mosque (Mosque of Athens)
- Coordinates: 37°59′10″N 23°42′00″E

Architecture
- Type: Mosque
- Funded by: Government of Greece
- Completed: 2020

Specifications
- Capacity: 366 worshipers
- Interior area: 1,000 m^{2} (11,000 sq ft)
- Site area: 1.7 ha (4.2 acres)
- Materials: Steel

The Votanikos Mosque, more commonly known as the Mosque of Athens (Greek: Ισλαμικό Τέμενος Αθηνών, romanized: Islamiko Temenos Athinon) or the Athens Mosque (Greek: Τζαμί της Αθήνας, romanized: Tzami tis Athinas, lit. 'Athens Mosque'), is a mosque in the Votanikos neighbourhood of Athens, Greece. It is the first official mosque in the Greek capital since the Greek War of Independence. Until the mosque was completed in 2020, Athens was the only European capital city without a mosque. Construction of the mosque was opposed by the Greek Orthodox Church and subject to civil and judicial protests. Construction of the mosque was funded by the Greek Government and it is the only mosque in a European capital built solely using government funds.

== History ==
Ottoman-era mosques in Athens, such as the Tzistarakis Mosque and the Fethiye Mosque, function solely as archaeological monuments and have not been used for worship since the mid-1920s. Until 2014, only Orthodox Christianity, Judaism, and Islam–in some areas of Greece–were legally allowed to open places of worship. While there was no official mosque near Athens, more than a hundred makeshift mosques formed in the area. As of November 2020, ten had been given permission by the Greek government to continue operating but the others were moved or shut down.

The first law passed by the Greek Parliament about constructing a ″Turkish mosque″ in the Athens area was in 1890. In 1970, conservative Arab countries offered the funding of a mosque in Athens but neither the law nor the proposal were realized. Increased immigration from Muslim countries in the late 20th- and early 21st centuries made the establishment more urgent. Approximately 200,000 Muslims live in the Athens area, many of whom are Pakistani. However, until 2020, there was no official mosque building.

The first attempt to establish a mosque in Athens dates to Law 2833 in 2000 which envisaged its establishment at Hourmouza in Paiania and was intended to be financed by Saudi Arabia. Due to the reaction of the Orthodox Church and locals, the project stalled.

In 2006, the effort was resumed with Law 3512 but with major modifications: it was decided that the construction would be financed solely by the Greek state which would retain complete control over the mosque and appoint its imam. The project was repeatedly delayed due to protest and judicial actions by various groups, including appeals the Council of State. Additionally, despite four successive public tenders, contractors showed no interest in bidding for the project. Amongst the most vocal of the far-right opponents was Golden Dawn, a neo-Nazi former political party that between 2009 and 2015 became the third-largest party in the Hellenic Parliament.

== Construction ==
The fifth tender was successful and the contract was awarded to a consortium comprising four of Greece's biggest construction firms (J&P-Avax, GEK Terna, Aktor, and Intrakat): the contract was signed on 10 October 2016. The location had to be cleared by the police first, as it was occupied by far-right protesters, and construction began on 4 November. Once a naval garage, the Hellenic Navy handed over the 17 stremmata (1.7-hectare (4.2-acre)) site. Existing structures were torn down for the building of a new complex, planned to include a parking space and children's playground. The mosque was planned to have an area of 1,000 square metres (11,000 sq ft) and comprise two areas of worship, one for men with a capacity for 500, and one for women, with a capacity of 50. A minaret was not planned. The mosque was financed by the Greek state, without any outside financial support; it is the only mosque in a European capital built solely using government funds. The budget was €887,000.

Despite the mosque being completed in 2019, due to the COVID-19 pandemic, the mosque's official opening was delayed until 3 November 2020. Its first and current imam is Zaki Mohammed.

== Gallery ==
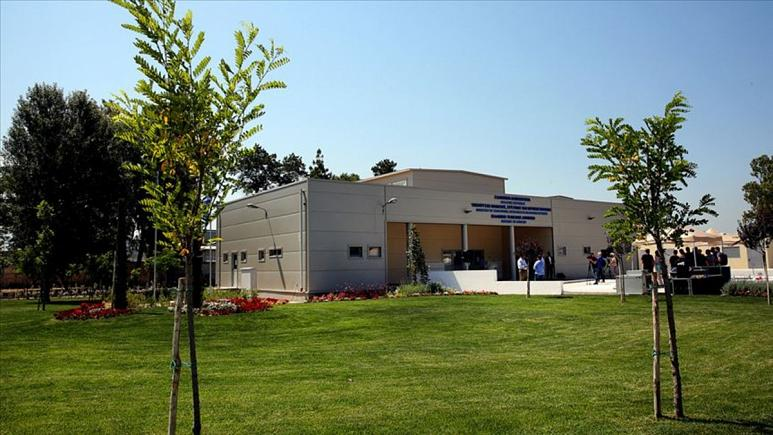
The mosque exterior and surrounding grounds

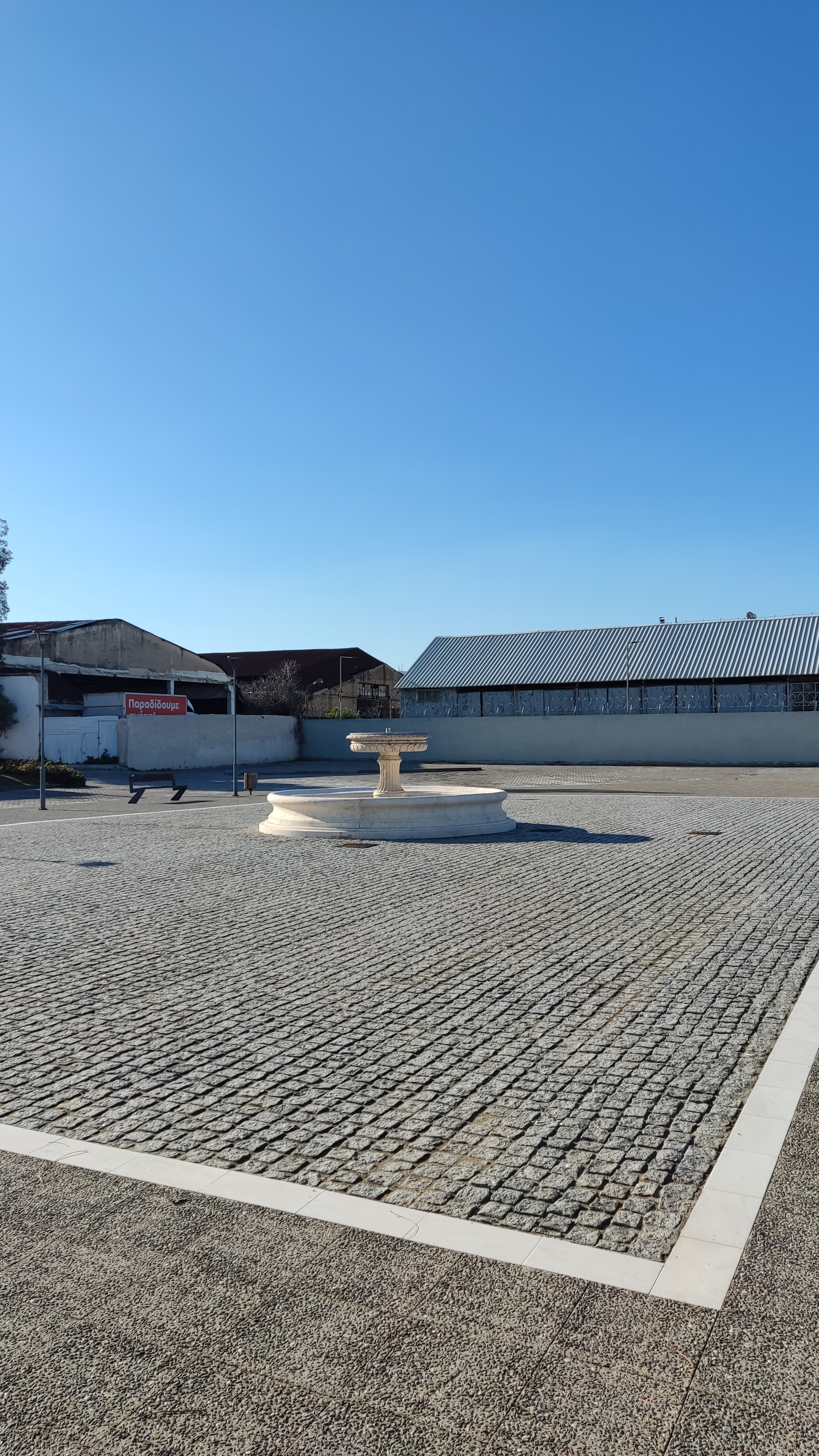
The fountain and sahn

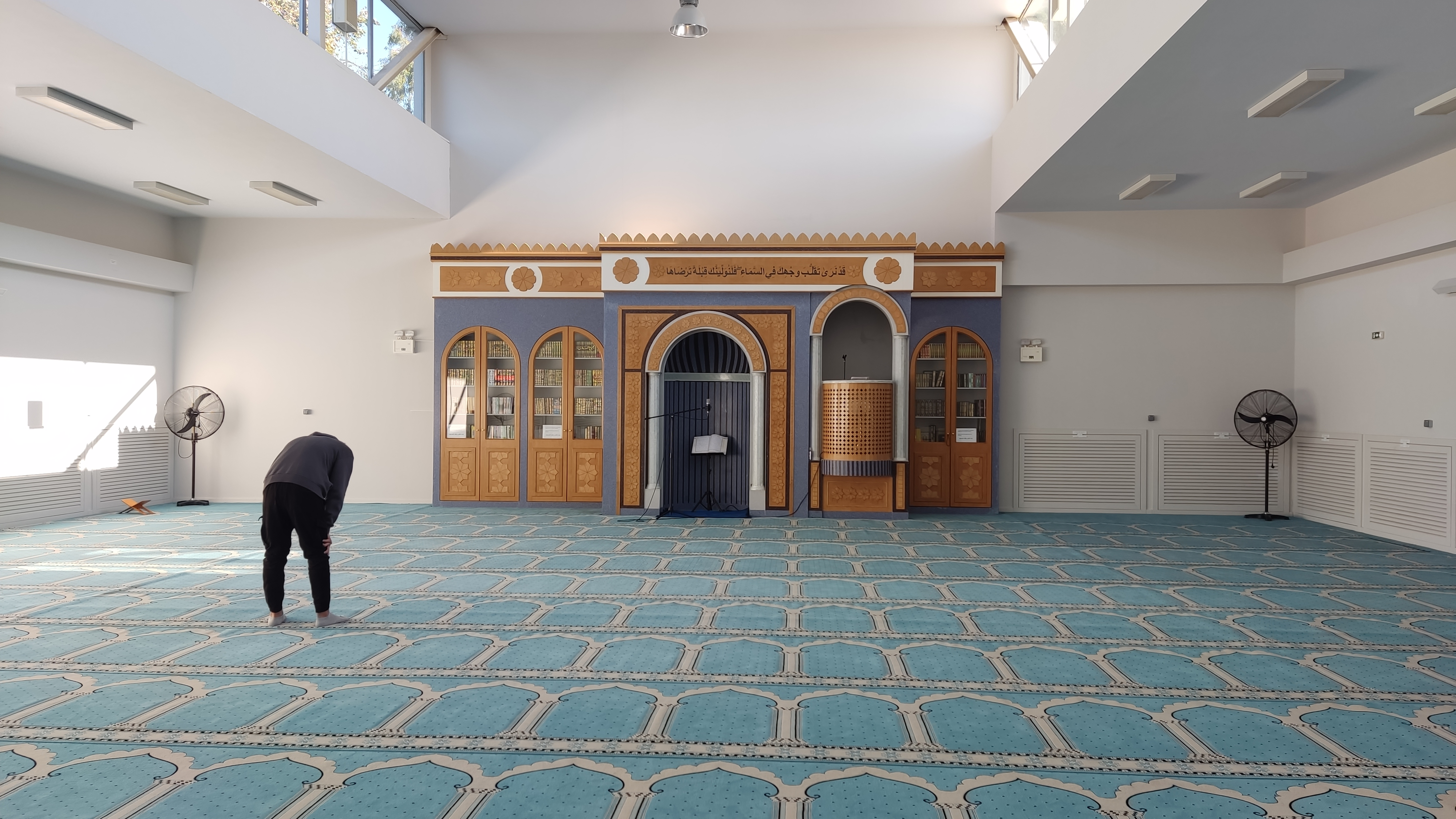
Interior of the prayer hall

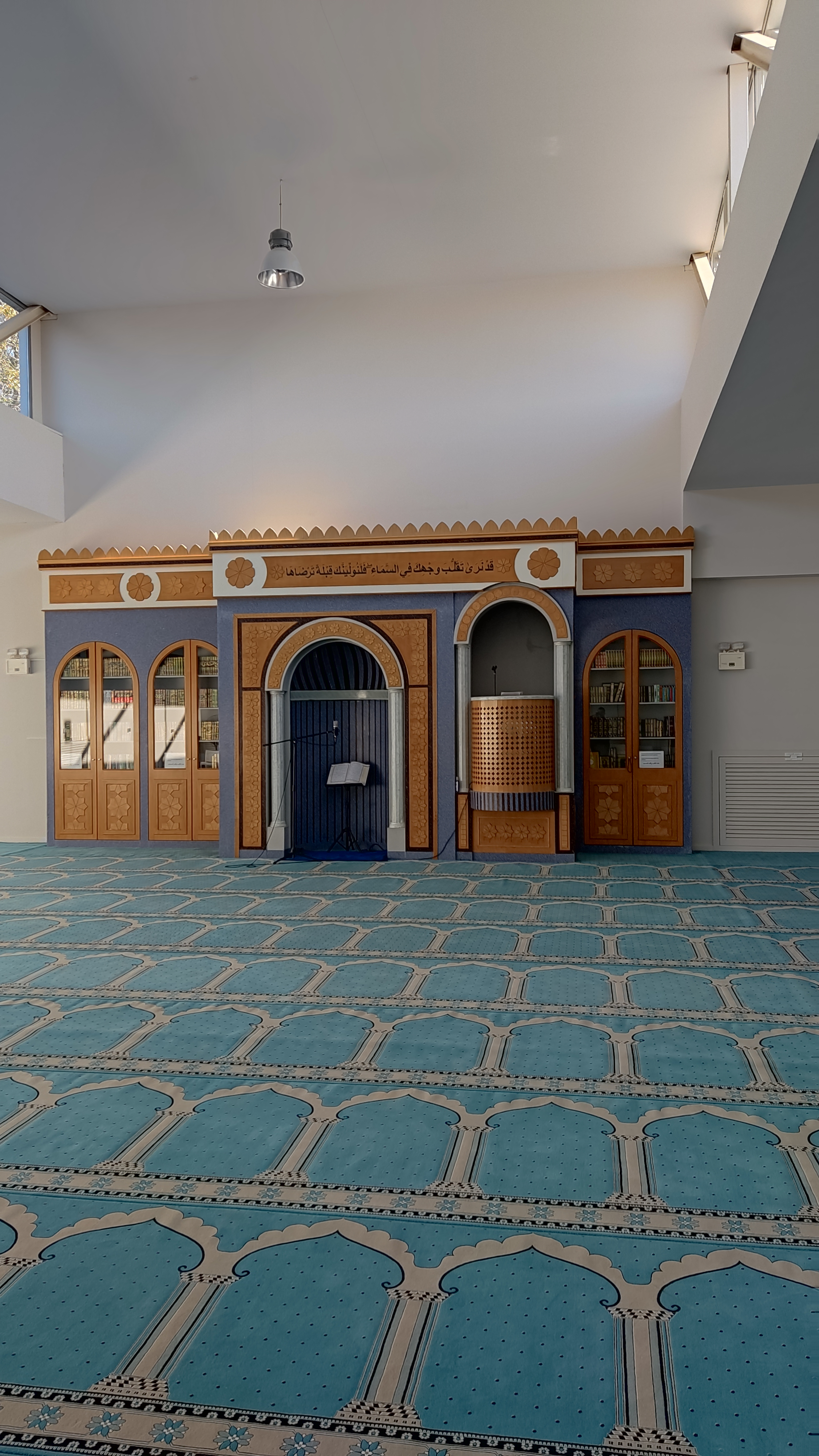
The mosque minbar

== See also ==
- Islam in Greece
- List of mosques in Greece
