= Kütüklü Baba Tekke =

Tekke in Selino, Greece

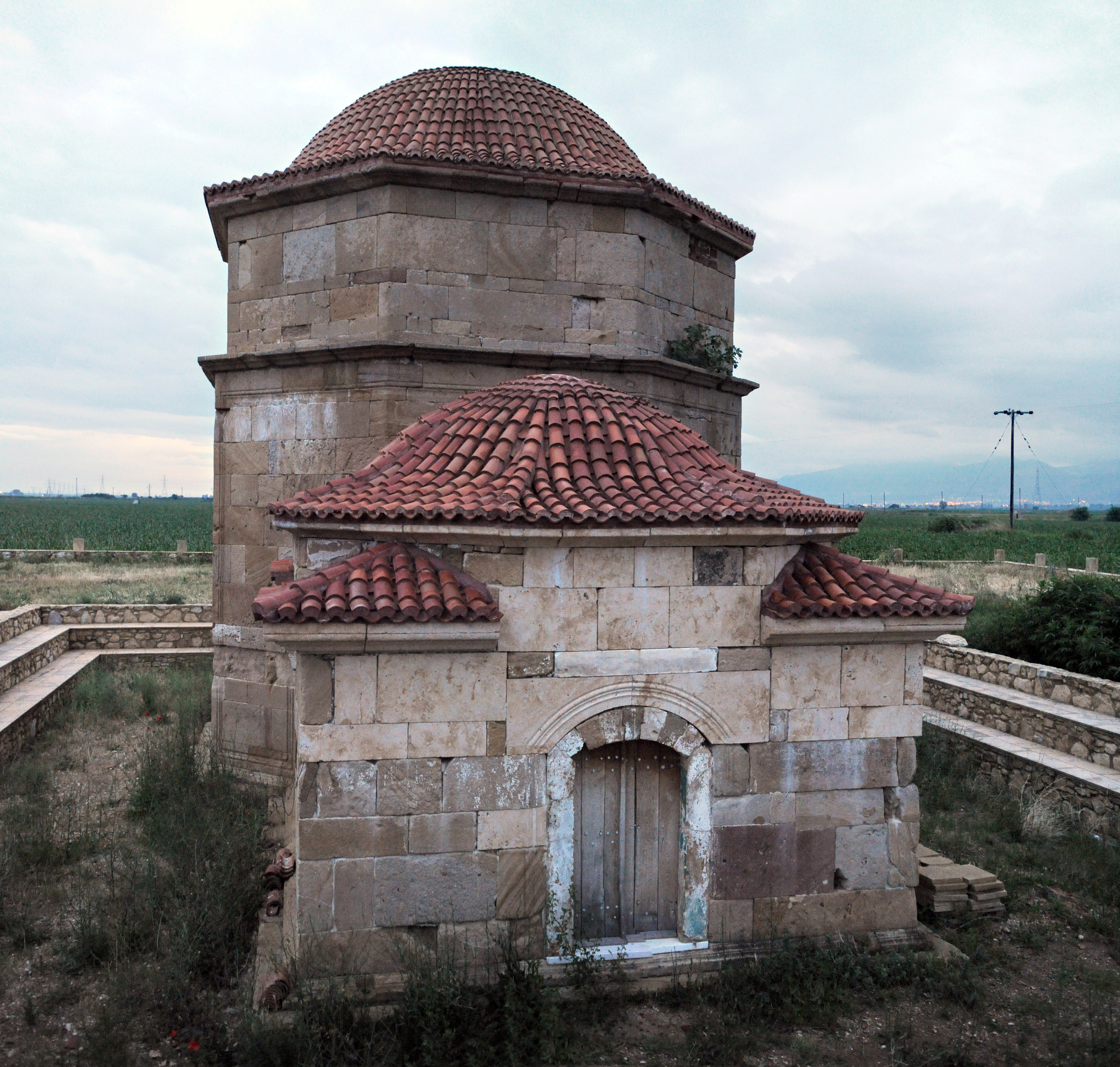
- The türbe complex

- Location within Greece

Religion
- Affiliation: Islam
- Region: Western Thrace/East Macedonia and Thrace
- Rite: Mevlevi order Bektashi order
- Ecclesiastical or organizational status: Open
- Year consecrated: 15th-16th century

Location
- Municipality: Abdera
- Country: Greece
- Interactive map of Kütüklü Baba Tekke
- Coordinates: 41°4′32.01″N 25°3′29.89″E

Architecture
- Style: Ottoman architecture
- Founder: Kütüklü Baba

The Kütüklü Baba Tekke (Greek: Τεκές Κιουτουκλού Μπαμπά, Turkish: Kütüklü Baba Tekkesi) is an Ottoman khanqah in the region of Western Thrace, in northern Greece. It dates back to around the fifteenth or sixteenth century. It lies close to site of ancient Anastasiopolis-Peritheorion, near modern Selino in the Xanthi regional unit. Today it is utilised as a shrine by both the Muslim and Christian communities of Greek Thrace.

== Name ==
To the Muslim inhabitants of the area the building is known by its full name, while the Christians simply refer to it as the tekke. The designation of "tekke", that is, a dervish gathering place, instead of a türbe (a burial monument), however is incorrect. This is due to the fact that before 1826 a dervish tekke did stand in the area, which was then destroyed by Sultan Mahmud II. Sultan Mahmud at that time campaigned to expel all the Janissaries whose members were associated with the Bektashi order of dervishism.

== History ==
According to one theory, Kütüklü Baba was a dervish who served under the Ottoman general Gazi Evrenos and built this tekke during his military campaign.

== Architecture ==
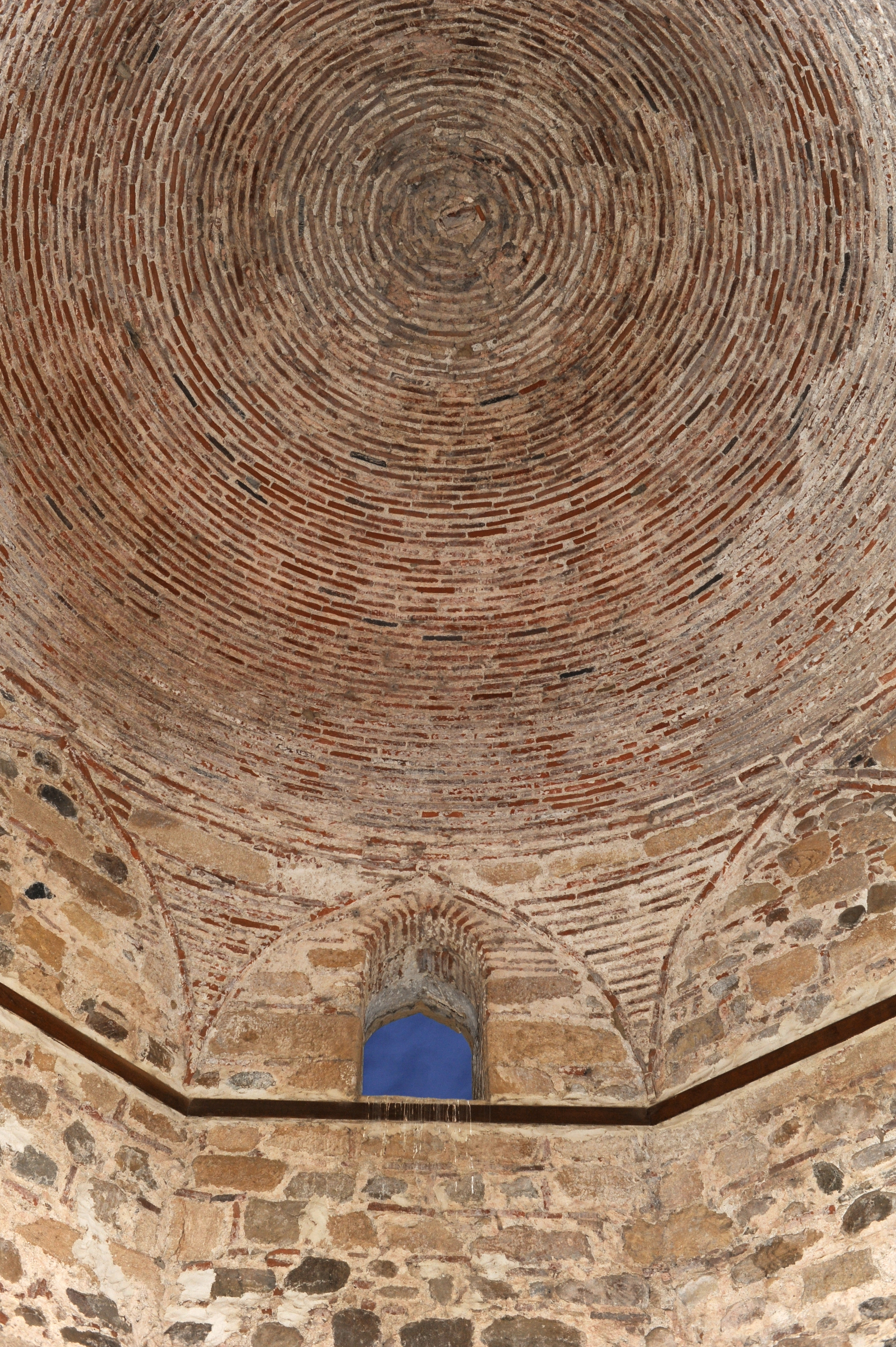
Interior and dome of the türbe.

The tekke, based on its architectural structure (octagonal room) is likely to have been built in the fifteenth and early sixteenth centuries. Today only the türbe (mausoleum) is preserved, which is a stone octagonal building with a domed roof. It is possible that the tekke was erected on the ruins of a previous Christian church.

Today the tekke is utilized as a religious place by the Muslim and Christian residents both. The Muslims venerate it as the tomb of Kütüklü Baba, while the Christians have converted the eastern part of the monument into a makeshift church dedicated to Saint George.

== Local tradition and folklore ==
According to one theory (Tsigaras) the attendance of Muslims is due to the fact that the cult of Saint George is connected with the Bektasi/Alevi practice. Zenkinis writes that when refugees from East Thrace arrived in the area in 1920, they found dervishes inside the tekke and were told that the tekke had originally been a Christian church dedicated to Saint Nicholas. The existence of this tradition is also confirmed by the Byzantine scholar Charalambos Bakirtzis. According to another tradition, this church was the burial place of a Catalan Company knight named Berenger D'Entensa, who was killed in a skirmish with the men of En Rocafort's comrade-in-arms during their march from Gelibolu to Salonica in 1307. According to Lowry, if a church did exist in the area in the fourteenth century it is more likely that building material from it was re-used for the tekke.

== See also ==
- Ottoman Greece
- Budala Hodja Tekke
- Seyyid Ali Sultan Tekke
- Bedesten of Thessaloniki

== Bibliography ==
- Lowry, Heath W. (2009). In the Footsteps of the Ottomans: A Search for Sacred Spaces & Architectural Monuments in Northern Greece. Istanbul: Mary Martin Booksellers / Bahçesehir University Publications. ISBN 9789756437865.
