= Panathinaikos F.C. New Stadium =

Football stadium in Athens Greece

- Rendering of the proposed stadium
- Interactive map of Panathinaikos F.C. New Stadium
- Full name: New Panathinaikos Stadium
- Location: Votanikos, Athens, Greece
- Coordinates: 37.9823°N 23.695°E
- Owner: Municipality of Athens
- Operator: Panathinaikos A.O./Panathinaikos F.C.
- Capacity: 39,074 Football; 3,100 Volleyball, Handball and Basketball Stadium; 500 Swimming Pool
- Public transit: Eleonas metro station

Construction
- Groundbreaking: 6 April 2023
- Opened: April or May 2027
- Cost: 125.000.000 €
- Architect: A&S ARCHITECTS
- Main contractors: GEK Terna; Metka ATE; AKTOR

Tenants
- Panathinaikos F.C. Panathinaikos A.O.

Panathinaikos New Stadium (also known as Votanikos Stadium) is a football stadium with an additional multi-use sports complex in Elaionas, Athens, Greece, that will host all departments of the Panathinaikos sports club set for completion in May 2027. The complex will be located in the historic Votanikos neighborhood, west of Athens. The entire project includes the football stadium (seating projected to be at 39,074), a volleyball, handball and basketball stadium (seating 3,100), swimming pool (seating 500), and gymnastics facilities.

The Votanikos neighborhood currently houses mostly vacant, dilapidated storage and industrial facilities.

The football stadium was to be ready for the 100 years of the club in 2008, with the rest of the complex completed by 2011. This construction was the idea of popular former president of Panathinaikos Thanasis Giannakopoulos.

By October 2013, and due to the club's and the country's financial troubles, the construction of the Votanikos Arena had stopped and consequently the plans for the demolition of the Leoforos Alexandras Stadium were cancelled.

In 2022, mayor of Athens Kostas Bakogiannis announced that the project is going to be implemented and its construction will last 3 years. The most significant part of the agreement between Panathinaikos and the Municipality of Athens was that the team had to offer Leoforos Alexandras Stadium in exchange of its new stadium. After the construction of the arenas, Panathinaikos will be the owner of the entire Votanikos Sport Complex for 99 years. The new football, basketball, volleyball arenas and other facilities will be ready at the start of 2027–28 season. The construction works started on the 6th of April 2023.
