= Pavlos Melas (municipality) =

Pavlos Melas Παύλος Μελάς
- Municipality
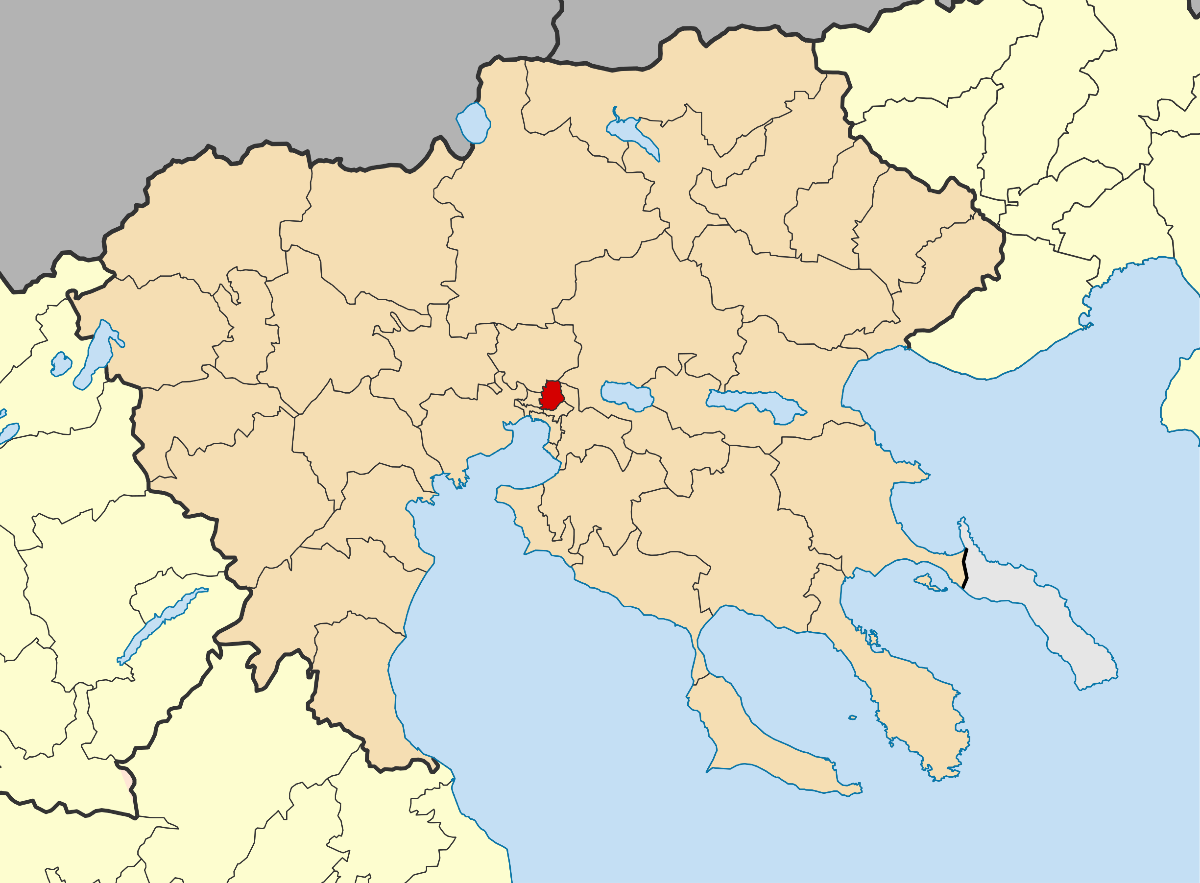

- Location within Greece
- Coordinates: 40°40′N 22°56′E
- Country: Greece
- Administrative region: Central Macedonia
- Regional unit: Thessaloniki
- Seat: Stavroupoli

Area
  - Municipality: 23.763 km^{2} (9.175 sq mi)

Population (2021)
  - Municipality: 100,194
  - Density: 4,216.4/km^{2} (10,920/sq mi)
- Time zone: UTC+2 (EET)
  - Summer (DST): UTC+3 (EEST)
- Website: www.pavlosmelas.gr

Pavlos Melas is a municipality in the regional unit of Thessaloniki, Central Macedonia, Greece. It is named after a Greek revolutionary officer of the Macedonian Struggle, Pavlos Melas. It was formed during the administrative reform introduced by the Kallikratis plan and encompasses the former municipalities of Efkarpia, Polichni and Stavroupoli. The seat of Pavlos Melas is Stavroupoli.

== Subdivisions ==
- Municipal Unit of Efkarpia: It is located on the northern part of Pavlos Melas and has a population of 15,416 residents.
- Municipal Unit of Polichni: It is located on the east side of Pavlos Melas and has a population of 38,887 residents.
- Municipal Unit of Stavroupoli: It is located on the southwest side of Pavlos Melas and has a population of 45,891 residents.
