= Imaret of Komotini =

Imaret in Komotini, Greece

- Ιμαρέτ Κομοτηνής
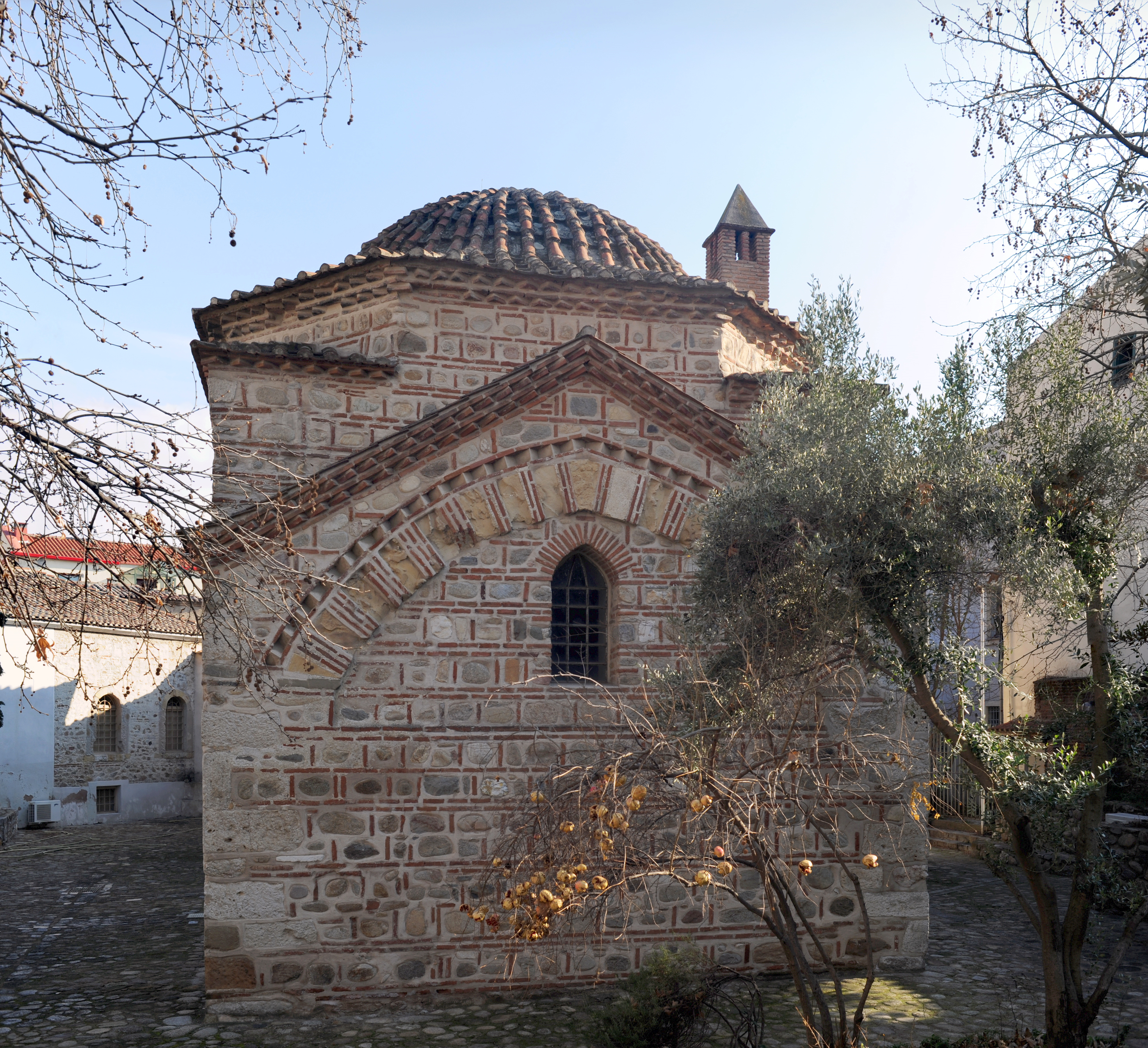
- The imaret today

- Location within Greece

General information
- Status: Museum
- Type: Imaret
- Architectural style: Ottoman architecture
- Classification: Protected monument
- Location: Komotini, Greece
- Coordinates: 41°07′08.7″N 25°24′07.5″E
- Opened: 1360-1399
- Renovated: 1996-1999

Technical details
- Material: Brick, marble, stone

Design and construction
- Developer: Evrenos

The Imaret of Komotini (Greek: Ιμαρέτ Κομοτηνής) is an imaret complex in the town of Komotini, in the Western Thrace region of northern Greece, and is thought to be one of the oldest surviving Ottoman monuments in Europe. It is dated between the early 1360s and the end of the fourteenth century. It was built by Ottoman conqueror Gazi Ahmed Evrenos near the eastern walls of the Byzantine Koumoutzedes Castle. Ever since 1999 the building has functioned as the Ecclesiastical Museum of the Metropolis of Maroneia and Komotini. It is possible that it was built on the site of a previous Byzantine church dedicated to the Holy Wisdom of God.

== History ==
At the time of Gazi Evrenos, it was located on the eastern walls of the Byzantine castle / small outpost on the outskirts of Mosynopolis on the road axis from Constantinople to the west. In the nineteenth century during the occupation of the city by the Bulgarians, the eastern part of Imaret was converted into a church; an inscription in Cyrillic alphabet is preserved on the door above the arch to this day. In 1924, an ice factory complex was created on the site, while some areas were used until 1973 by the electric lighting service of Komotini.

Local tradition of Komotini has linked the imaret to a previous Byzantine church dedicated to the Holy Wisdom (Hagia Sophia) in this specific location, and supposedly parts of the church were incorporated into the building.

== Architecture ==
The imaret of Komotini is considered to be one of the oldest examples of Ottoman architecture in Thrace (it consists of three spaces that form a T shape on the ground plan, in zawiya-style) and is built in the Byzantine technique of using brick-enclosed masonry, also characteristic of early Ottoman buildings. On the south side of the building, a built-in marble female head dating to the Roman period has been discovered. During the restoration that took place between 1996 and 1999, the windows were restored to their original shape and form, while the roof was tiled with the same type of tiles, while the walls and mortars were repaired.

== Ecclesiastical museum ==
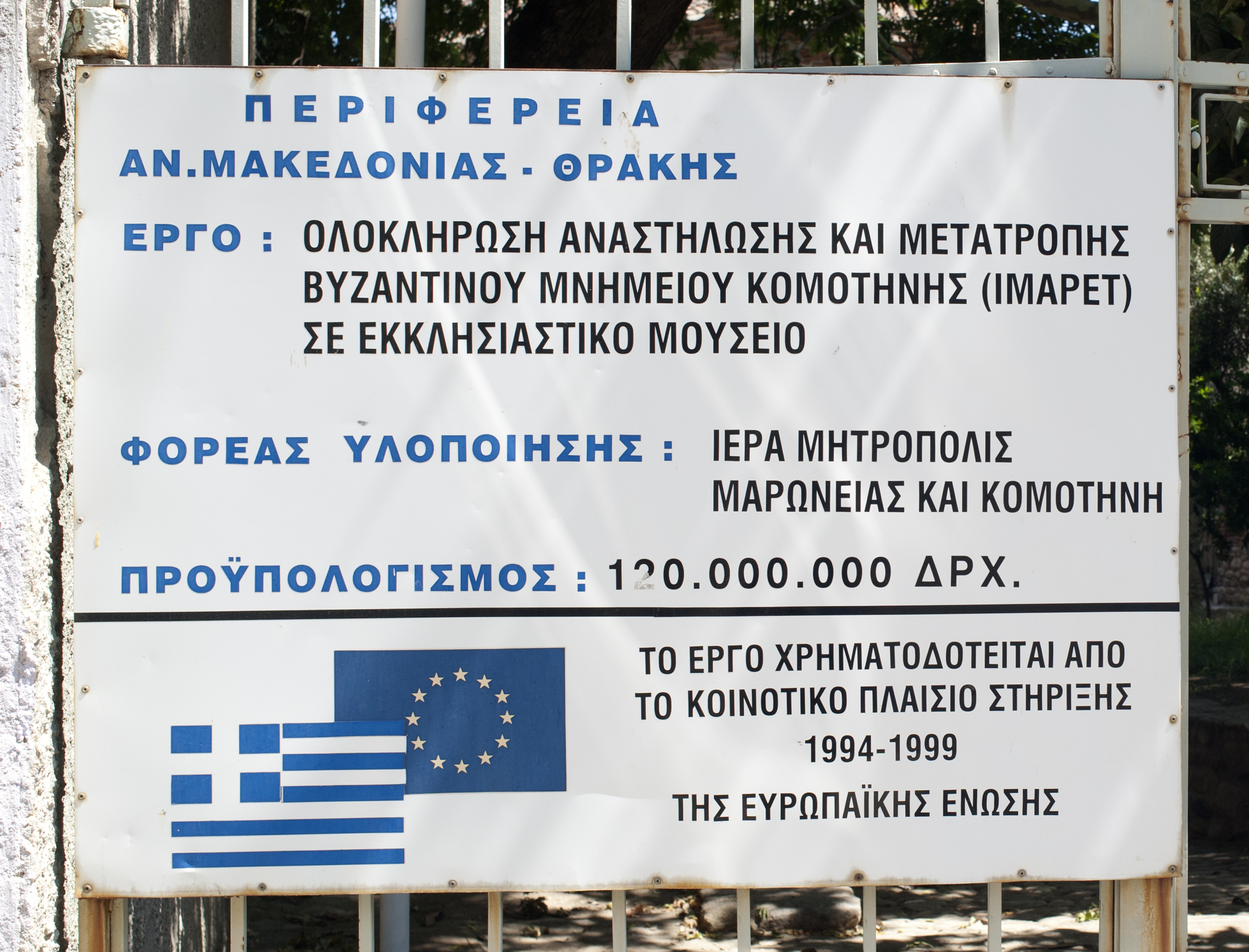
Sigh outside denoting its status as monument.

The imaret was made into a museum after a concession in 1996 in order for renovation and restoration works to begin on the building. Today it functions as a museum with ecclesiastical exhibits (which date from the sixteenth to the twentieth centuries) such as icons, sacred vessels, vestments, manuscripts from churches in the area but also donations from refugees from Asia Minor who settled in the Rhodope region following the exchange of populations between Greece and Turkey in 1923.

The conversion of the imaret into an ecclesiastical museum took place between 1994 and 1999 with the support of the European Union. The sign placed outside the church-museum reads that it is "a Byzantine monument in Komotini which was converted into a church museum (imaret)". The Association of University Graduates of the Western Thrace Minority published a report on the matter to the Organization for Security and Cooperation in Europe (OSCE) saying that this move was aimed at "changing the identity of the Ottoman monument, and with the help of the European Union at that."

== Gallery ==
Imaret of Komotini

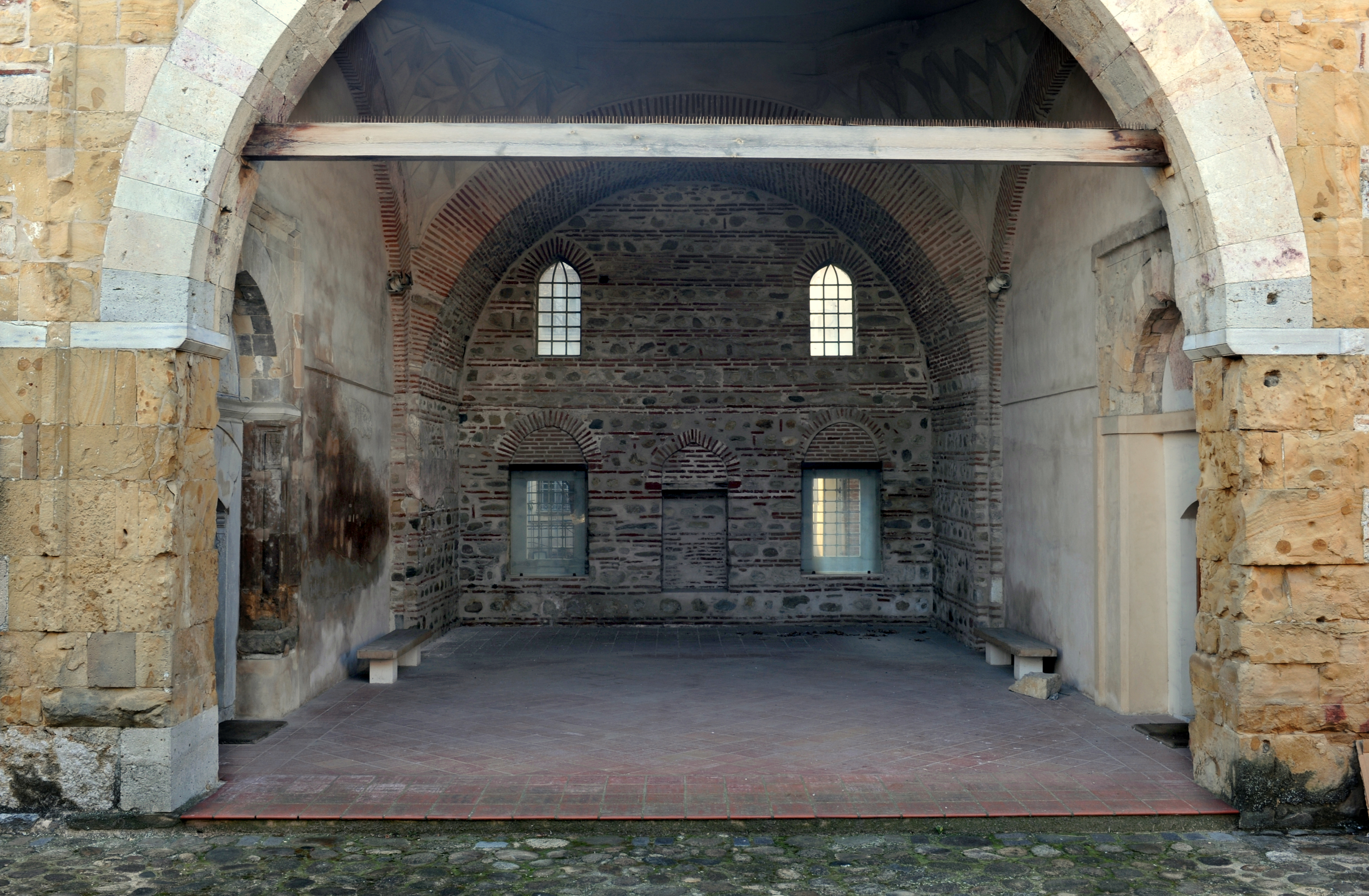
Northern façade

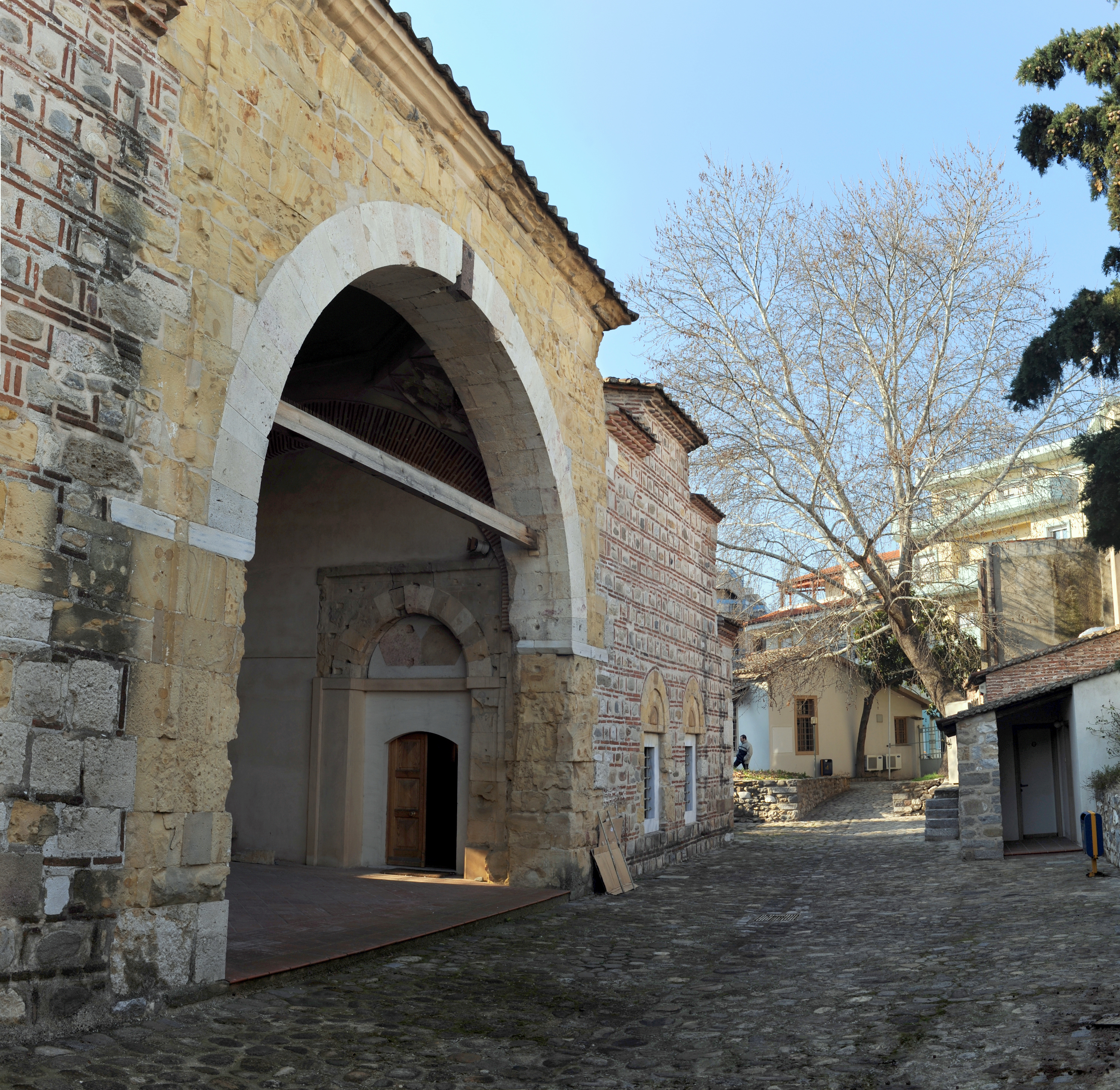
Northwestern view of the Imaret.

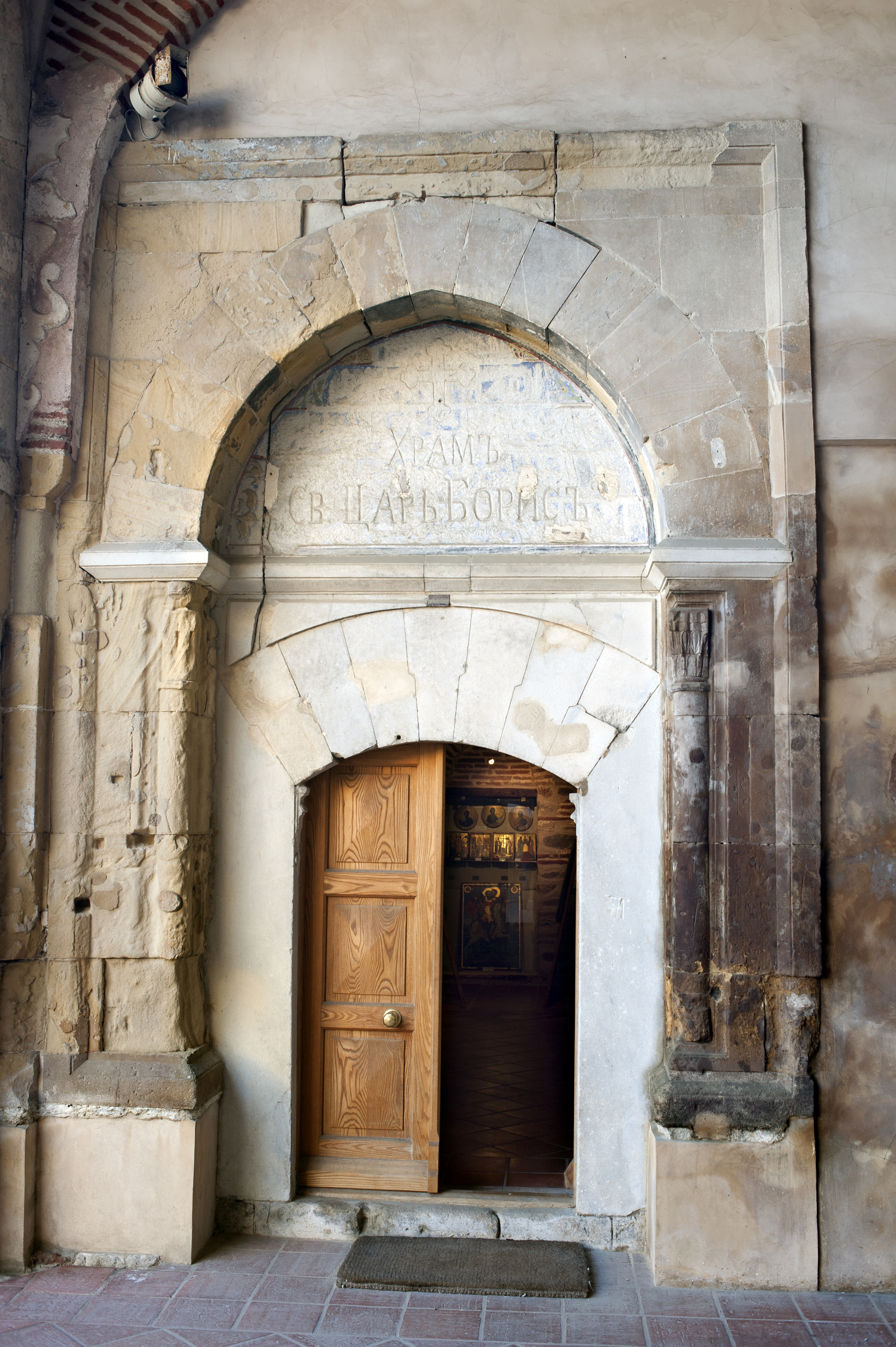
Cyrillic inscription dating to Bulgarian occupation.

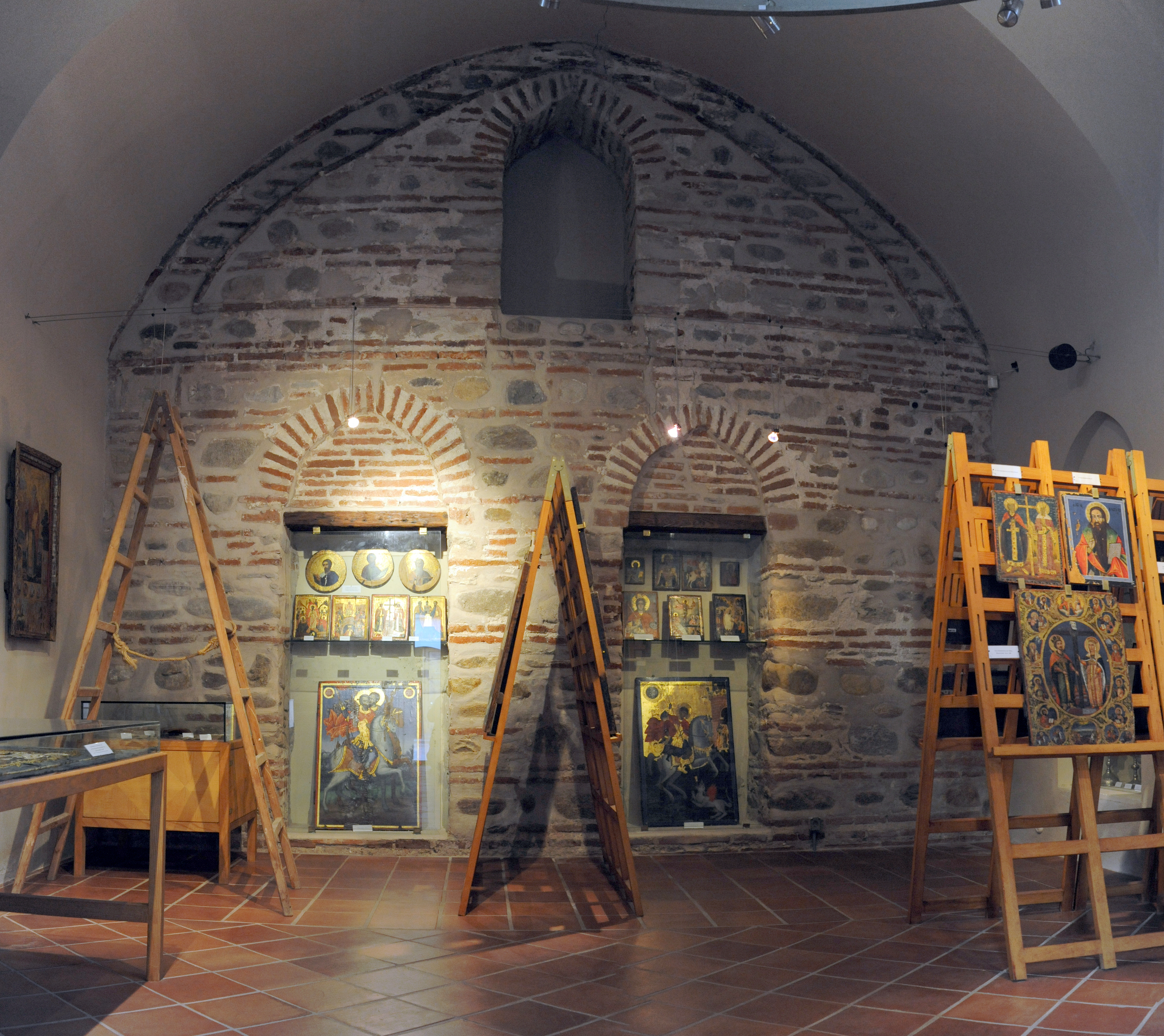
Exhibits inside.

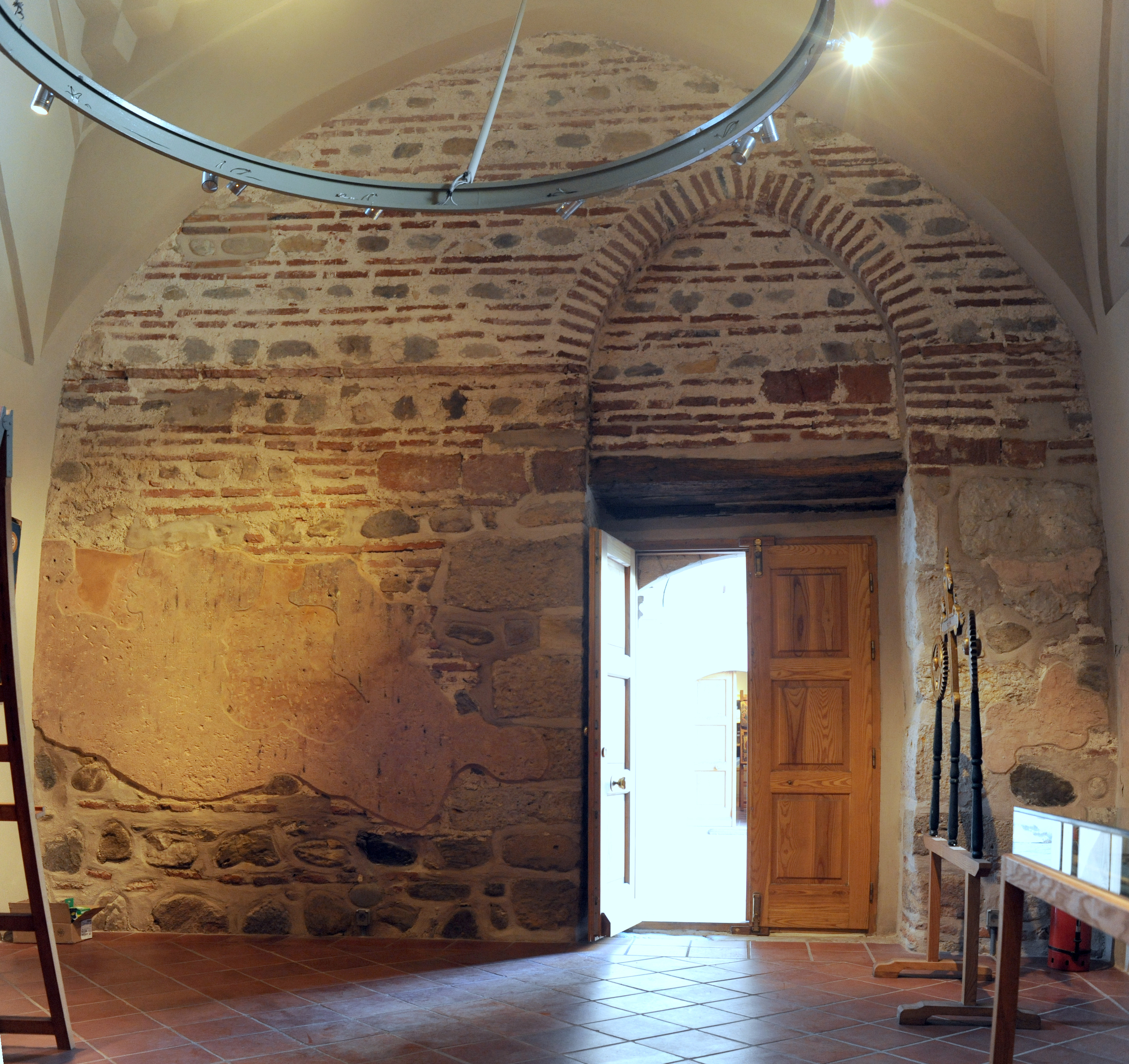
Interior.

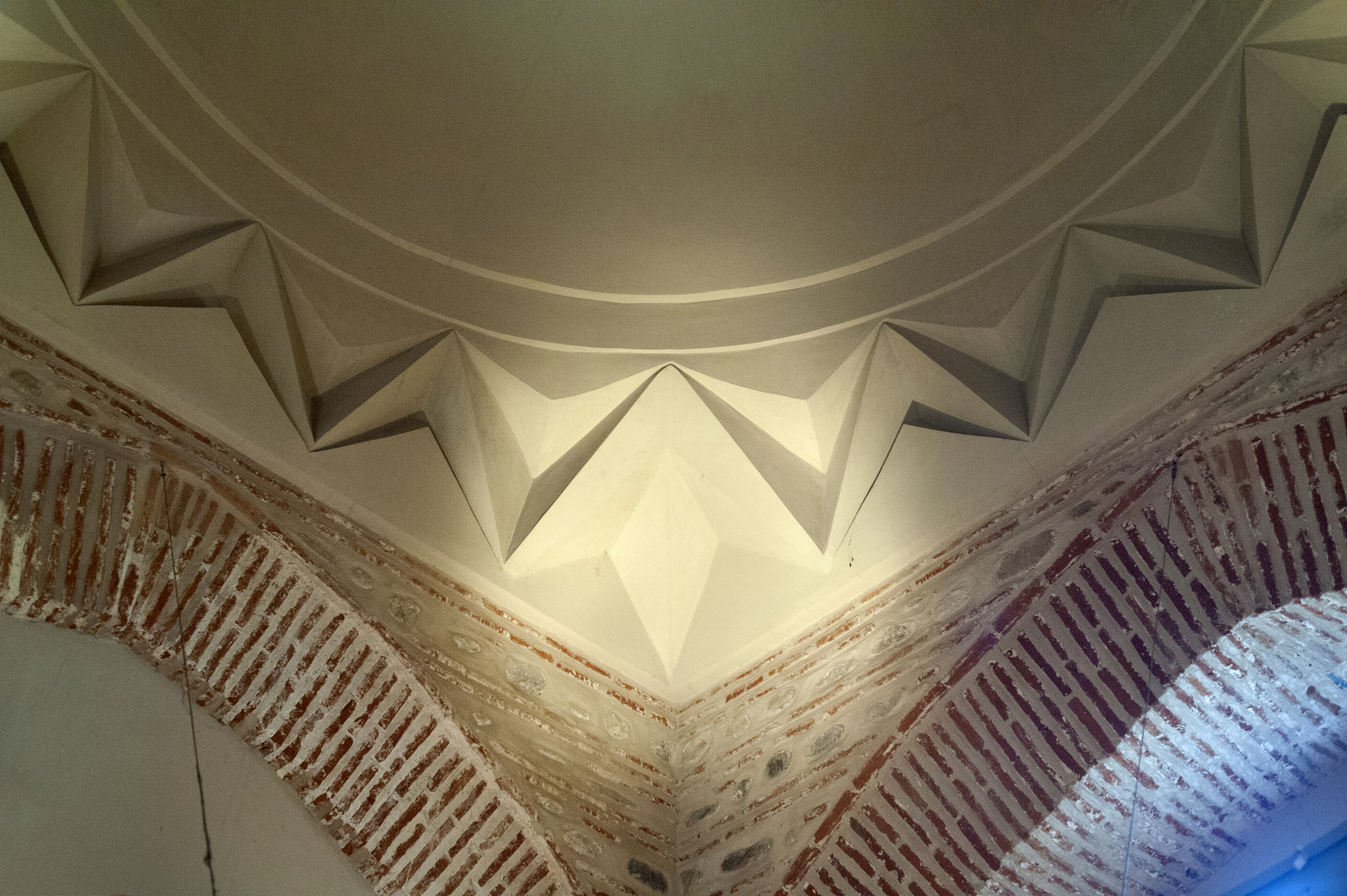
Interior design

== See also ==
- Imaret (Kavala)
- Hayriyye Madrasa
- Alaca Imaret Mosque
- Ottoman Greece
- Seyyid Ali Sultan Tekke

== Bibliography ==
- Kiel, Machiel (1983). "The Oldest Monuments of Ottoman-Turkish Architecture in the Balkans: The Imaret and the Mosque of Ghazi Evrenos Bey in Gümülcine (Komotini) and the Evrenos Bey Khan in the Village of Ilıca/Loutra in Greek Thrace (1370-1390)". Istanbul: Sanat Tarihi Yıllıġı, Kunsthhistorische Forschungen 12: 117–138.
- Ahmed Ameen Fatouh (2010). Οι Βυζαντινές επιδράσεις στην πρώιμη οθωμανική αρχιτεκτονική της Ελλάδος. Εθνικό και Καποδιστριακό Πανεπιστήμιο Αθηνών (ΕΚΠΑ): Σχολή Φιλοσοφική. Τμήμα Ιστορίας και Αρχαιολογίας. Τομέας Αρχαιολογίας και Ιστορίας της Τέχνης. pp. 26–31.
