= Hayriyye Madrasa =

Historical monument and school in Komotini, Greece

Hayriyye Madrasa of Komotini
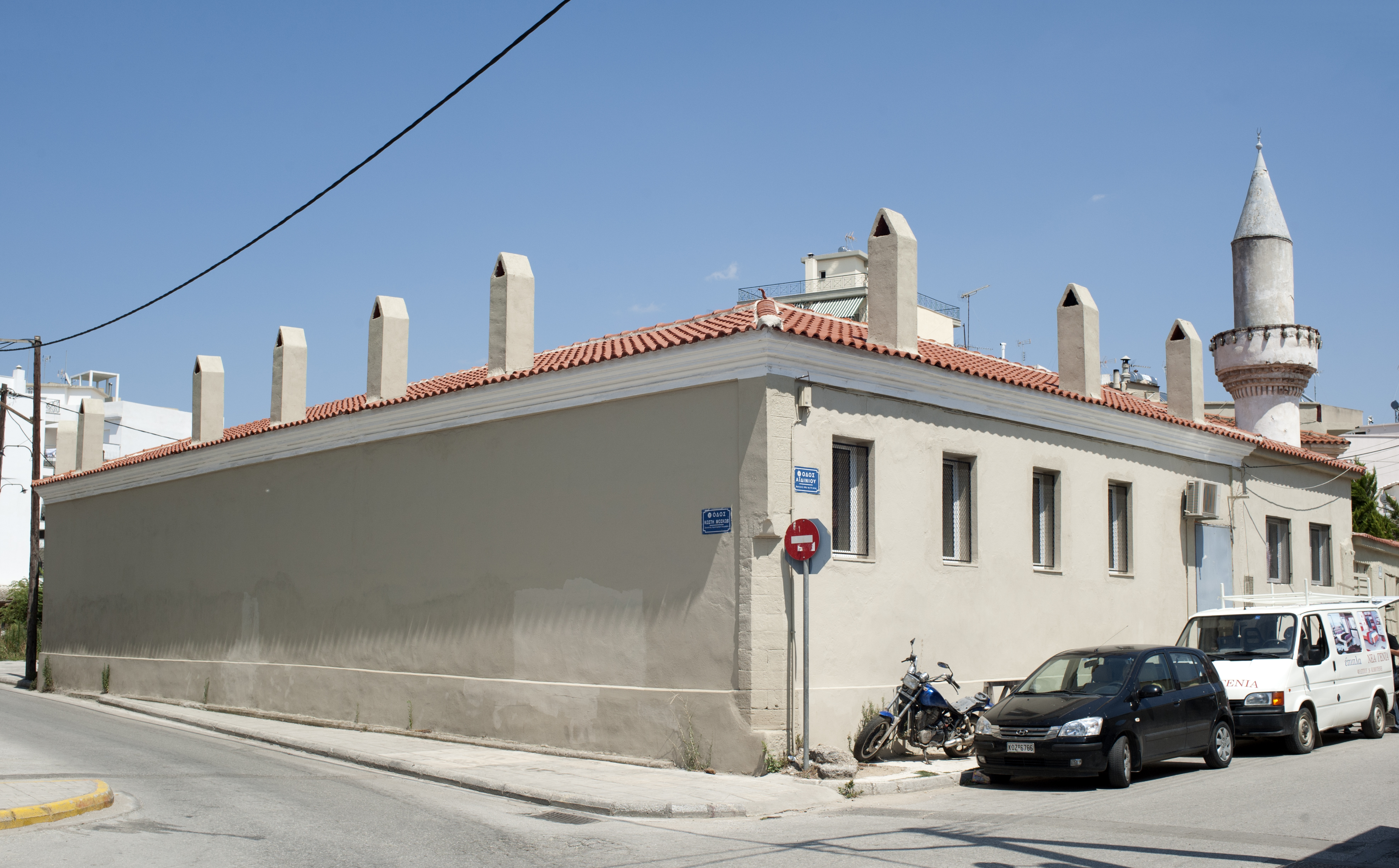
- The old madrasa complex (Kayali)

Location
- Komotini, Rhodope, 69100; Greece
- Coordinates: 41°7′16″N 25°24′6″E

Information
- Type: Public school
- Religious affiliation: Islam
- Established: 1730, 1949
- Founder: Hadji Zekeriya Efendi
- Gender: Mixed
- Age: 11 to 18

The Hayriyye Madrasa also commonly known as the Madrasa of Komotini (Greek: Χαϊρηγέ μεντρεσές or Ιεροσπουδαστήριο Κομοτηνής, Turkish: Medrese-i Hayriyye) is a madrasa turned minority school in the town of Komotini, in the Western Thrace region of Greece. It includes the complex of the Ottoman Kayali Madrasa and some newer buildings in the public market, where the Softalar Madrasa once stood.

Madrasas were Islamic schools established during the Ottoman Empire's domination. Religious ministers would receive their basic education from these schools. The education of the Muslim minority of Greece is determined by the Treaty of Lausanne. Up until the Bulgarian occupation of Komotini during World War II five madrasas were known to exist, but today the Hayriyye is one of the two to survive in the whole of Western Thrace, the other being one in Xanthi.

The Hayriyye Madrasa was re-founded in 1949-1951 under the jurisdiction of the mufti of Komotini, and nowadays functions as a secondary education school for the Muslim minority, including girls as well, of Komotini.

== Location ==
The modern school consists of two complexes of buildings; the modern complex of buildings south of the Municipal Market on 8 Konstantinou Palaiologou Street, which was founded in 1949–1951 on the site of the old Softalar Madrasa, and the historical complex from the Ottoman period (Kayali madrasa).

The madrasa's complex also includes the Kayalı Mosque. Today in the madrasa complex a new building has been added which is used as a student dormitory (for students who live outside of Komotini) while the cells of the old school have been converted into classrooms.

Since the 2016–2017 school year, alongside the boys' dormitories, there are also girls' dormitories for the female students who come from far away places and for whom the daily transport to their places is near impossible. The student dormitories are located in a building adjacent to the school that was designed appropriately.

== History ==
The Ottoman madrasa was built in 1730 (1142 in hijri years, as evidence by an Ottoman inscription written at the entrance of the Mosque) by Hadji Zekeriya Efendi and included the Islamic school, the Kayali Mosque and student accommodation cells. The madrasa consisted of 19 rooms and had a capacity of 92 students. A fountain stands in the inner courtyard of the madrasa, built by Debağ Hadji Ibrahim and dating to 1819 according to the Ottoman inscription on it.

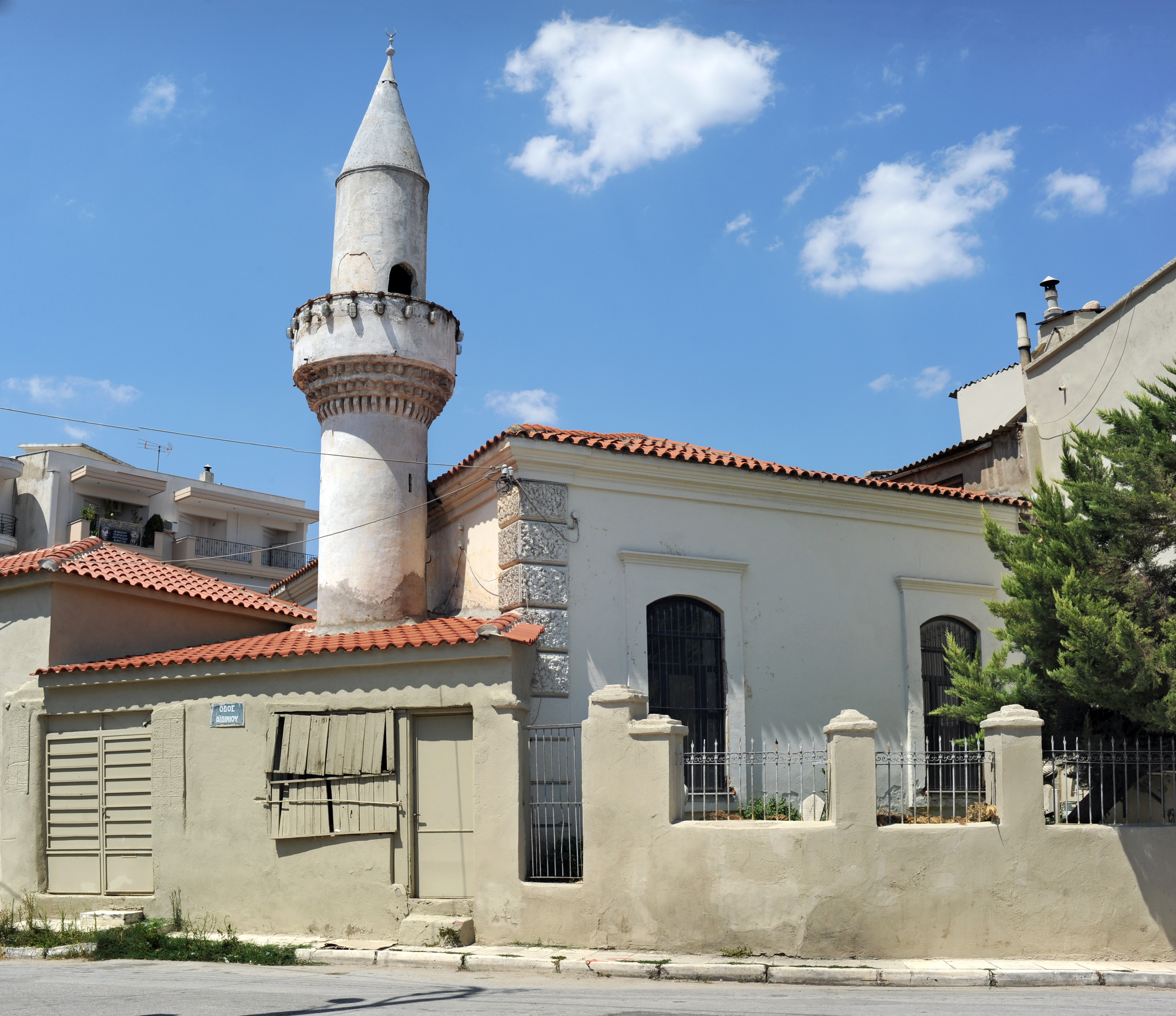
Kayali Mosque (surrounded by the madrasa on both sides).

In the past Komotini had five madrasas, all of which were operational until the Bulgarian occupation of Western Thrace in 1941–44. In 1949 the Council of Europe proposed cooperation between Greece and Turkey, and on April 20, 1951, a cultural-educational agreement between Greece and Turkey was signed in Ankara, which affected the education of the Muslims of Thrace. In 1949, the reopening of the seminary of Hayriyye took place under the jurisdiction of the mufti of Komotini. Κομοτηνής. Today in Thrace only two madrasas are open (this one and another in the village of Echinus) which are covered by law 2621/1998. These schools began as three-year clerical schools, which would provide basic training for Muslim clerics.

Until the 1960s, the title of the madrasa tuitor was enough for someone to be appointed as teacher. Subsequently, and until very recently, teachers were appointed among those who attended the Special Pedagogical Academy of Thessaloniki (to which only minority children had access), the vast majority of whose students were graduates of the Hayriyye Madrasa (whether in Komotini or Echinus). Then they were upgraded to four-year education, while from the end of 1960 to 1998 they were upgraded to five-year education. In 1998, the duration of studies changed to six years. Thus they were considered equal to the public church high schools (Article 4 Law 2621/23.06.1998). In the years 2000-2001 girls were also enrolled and thus the two schools ceased to serve the purpose of their original establishment, which was the training of priests of the Islamic faith. Today they are both equal to the secondary schools and serve the Muslim community of Thrace. Restoration works for the Kayali Mosque began in September 2012.

== Education ==
The operating costs of the school, its student dormitories that provide food and accommodation for the students who live in them, as well as the publishing of religious books for their studies, are covered by student fees, subsidies from the Greek state and from the financial support of the Muslim Property Management Committee. It publishes the religious course books itself that are required during teaching and supplies the corresponding school in Echinus with them as well.

From the 2016–2017 school year, there were changes in the detailed curriculum of the Muslim madrasas. On the one hand, the number of courses with a religious content was increased, and on the other hand, the existence of a STEM courses was established in order to give the possibility of a wide range of studies to the graduates.

In December 2018 students of Hayriyye Madrasa abstained from lessons and even barricaded themselves in the school in order to protest the law that would limit religious and Turkish language courses; Greek media was criticised for not covered the subject.

== See also ==
- Imaret (Kavala)
- Imaret of Komotini
- Ottoman Greece
- List of former mosques in Greece
- Seyyid Ali Sultan Tekke
