= Külliye =

Complex of buildings around a Turkish mosque

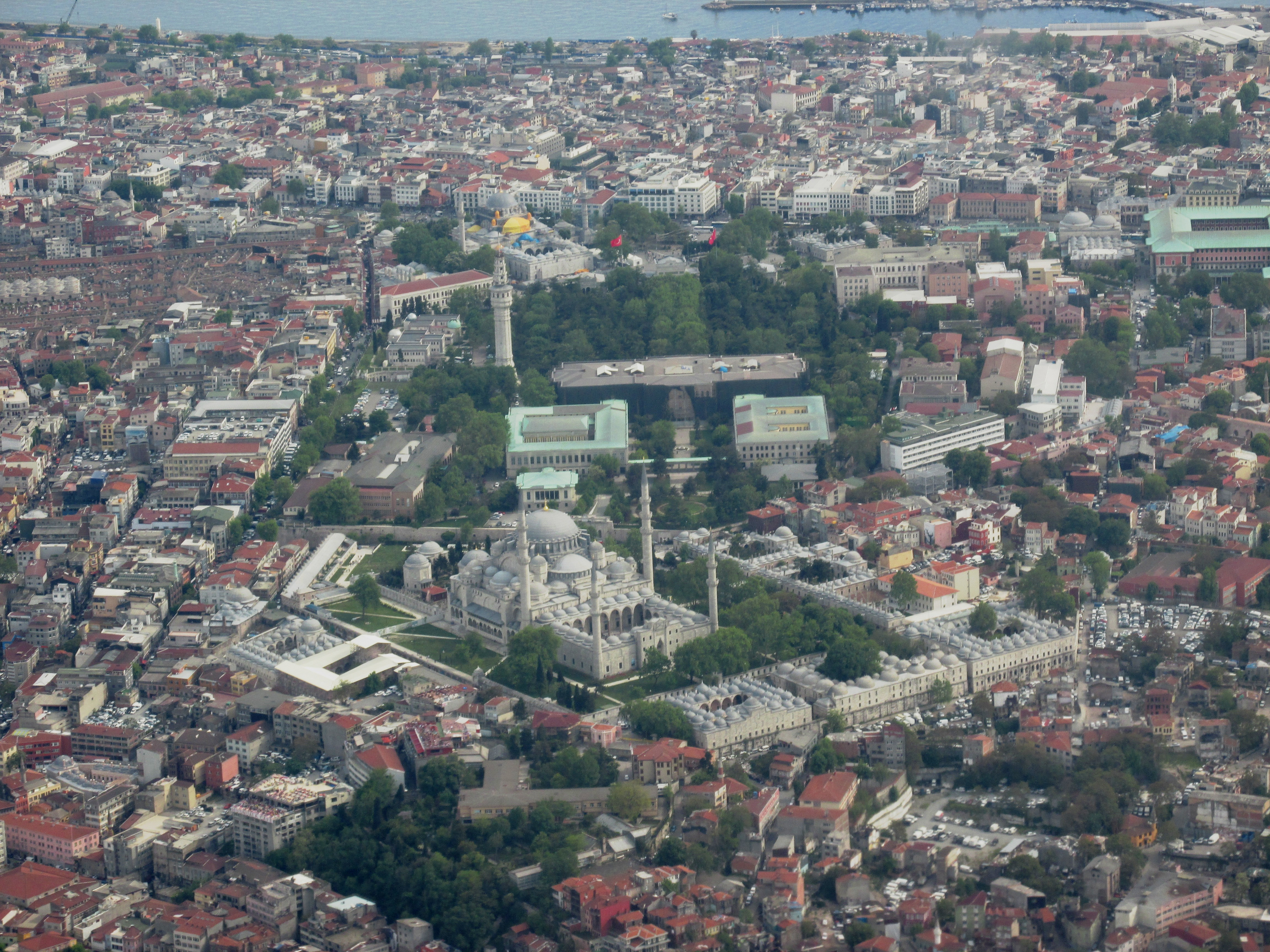
Süleymaniye Mosque and Külliye in Istanbul

A külliye (Ottoman Turkish: كلیه) is a complex of buildings associated with Turkish architecture centered on a mosque and managed within a single institution, often based on a waqf (charitable foundation) and composed of a madrasa, a Dar al-Shifa (clinic), kitchens, bakery, hammam, other buildings for various charitable services for the community and further annexes.

The tradition of külliye is particularly marked in Turkish architecture, starting in Seljuq, then especially in Ottoman, and also in Timurid architectural legacies. The word is derived from Turkish külli, meaning "complete".

== History ==
The külliye concept is based on the earliest form of the mosque. The mosque was not only used as a house of praying but also as a place for eating, teaching and as a hostel for the poor. The structure of the külliye derived from such concept. Instead of using one mosque for various services, other buildings were built to center on the mosque that provided the specific services. The services expanded and "were incorporated under one foundation document, and each housed its own building within an enclosure". This included the foundation of hospitals, law schools, preparatory colleges and a medical school among other services.

The majority of külliye were constructed and designed by architect Sinan. He was the master architect of the Ottoman Empire for fifty years in the sixteenth century. As master architect, he was responsible for all planning and construction works in the empire. Sinan built most of the külliye in Istanbul. The külliye built by Sinan set the pattern for other külliye architects. Most külliye followed these patterns: they were "located at the important points of the city" and the structures emphasize the religious center of the mosque. In addition, they were either "built on hills and sloped lands, coasts or peripheries of the city". The reason for this is that külliye helped create the silhouette and landscape of the city. The külliye were easily recognizable in that form and one is able to marvel at them from afar.

According to Ottoman Empire law, the lands and the state belonged to the Sultans. As a result of this, külliye are usually built for either the Sultan, one of the family members of the Ottoman Sultans or for the high state administrative officials such as the vizier or grand vizier. These aristocrats became the employers of architect Sinan and many others architects. As employers, they had a choice in choosing the location of the külliye and had an input in its design; Thus, they had an influence on the construction of the külliye.

=== Significance in Ottoman history ===
Külliyes had an important impact on Ottoman society. Külliye located in residential areas united the vicinity and residents and it served them with its various functional buildings. There were so many külliye in the Ottoman capital (Istanbul) that they serve as the centers that introduce the actual identity of the city. The külliye came to be the cores of many cities in the Ottoman Empire (especially Istanbul) and acted as important centers of cultural, religious, commercial and educational activities. They serve as one of the symbol of power and achievement of the Ottoman Empire.

== Administration ==
The administration of the külliye rested upon the administrative officers also under the chief eunuch in the department of harem at Topkapi Palace (Ottoman Sultans primary and official palace of residence). Among the administrative officers, the külliye also had "religious officers and teachers, porters, chanters, grave diggers, servants responsible for maintenance, including the polishing of courtyards and window grilles, cooks, scullions, plumbers, lamp-lighters, a guard against the theft of oil lamps, carpenters, masons and tillers responsible for the lead sheets covering over 500 domes". The staff magnitude illustrate the sophistication of the külliye; though it began with a simple concept, it had developed and become complex that a magnitude of staffs and officers were needed to manage it. The kitchen was responsible for feeding the staff and officers, as well as the students, travelers and the poor. This required an enormous supply of water, which serve as another reason for why the külliye were built near the coasts and peripheral parts of the city.

Külliye rose funding for the cost of the building and for the maintenance of such a vast foundation. This funding or endowments were "raised by public subscription, including the gift of various properties, ranging from entire estates to a mill or cottage". The donors ranged from the ruler (the Sultan) to office holders of greater and lesser ranks and then to the common people. The ruler tended to be the most significant donor as he was capable of assigning the revenues of a part of the realm.

== Examples of külliye ==
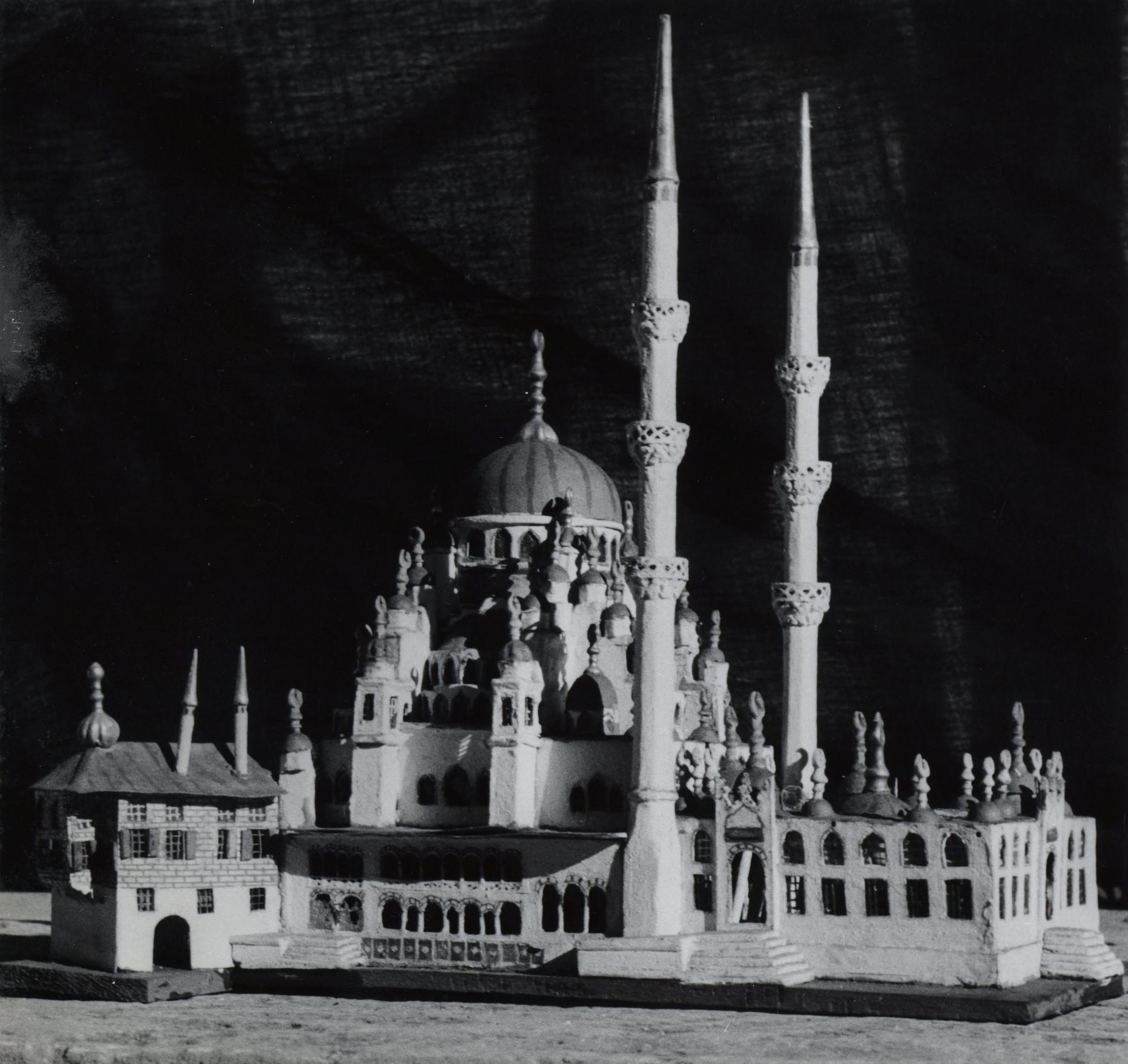
A model of Yeni Valide Mosque complex with Külliye structure.

The greatest of the külliye ever built was Süleymaniye Külliye in Istanbul. It was built by Suleiman the Magnificent. The külliye had "seven madrasas (schools), four of each of the Sunni law schools, a preparatory college and one for studying the Hadith and a medical school". These madrasas incorporated their own courts, latrines and two houses for the teachers. In addition, "there was a school for boys, a chantry, a hostel with stables, a bath, hospitals, public kitchen, shops, and fountains". Süleymaniye Külliye stood out with its educational services along with its religious services. The külliye environment resembled a university campus and it was the cultural and scientific center for Istanbul.

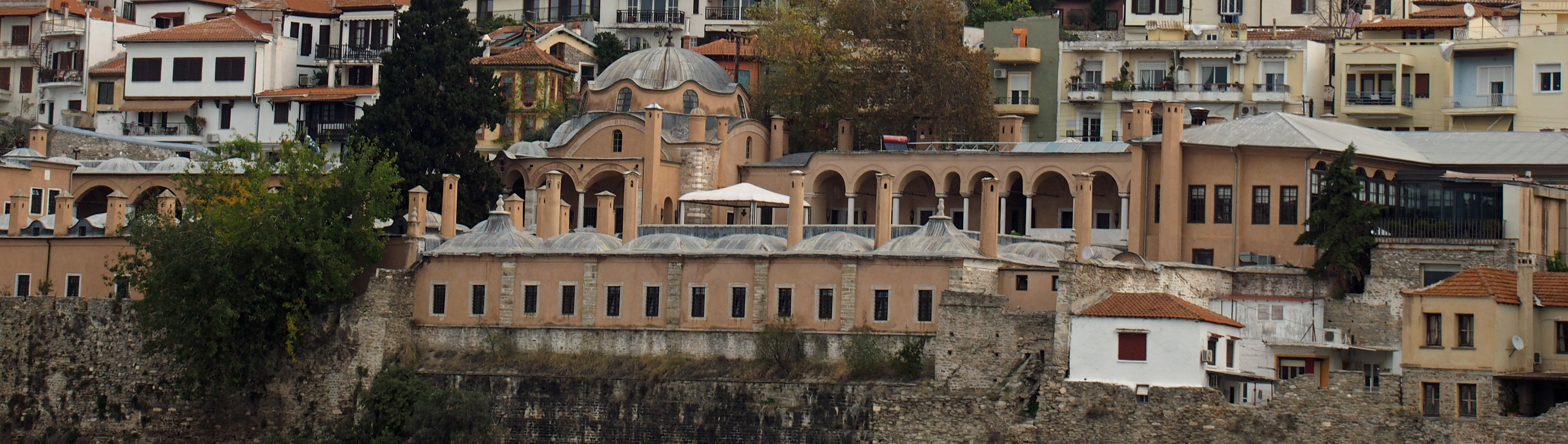
The former Kavala Imaret, now hotel, in Greece

There were many other külliye, but none of them came to the magnitude of Süleymaniye Külliye. Some examples of other külliye are:

- Sokullu Mehmet Pasha Külliye, consists of a mosque, madrasa and a dervish lodge
- Zal Mahmut Pasha Külliye, consists of a mosque, madrasa, mausoleum and fountain
- Kavala Imaret (in northern Greece), consisted of madrasas, a mekteb (Qur'anic primary school), the imaret, mesjids, and a wudu amongst other structures; the complex was repurposed in 2004 as a hotel
- Mihrimah Sultan Külliye, consists of a mosque, madrasa, mausoleum and Qur'anic school for children (khan, public kitchen, and hostel).

The presidential residence of the Republic of Turkey is officially named the 'Presidential Külliye', and is explicitly modelled on the traditional Ottoman Külliye.

== See also ==
- Architecture of Turkey
- Islamic architecture

== Bibliography ==
- Goodwin, Godfrey. 2008. "Külliyye." Encyclopaedia of Islam, vol. 5. Eds. P. Bearman and others. Amsterdam: Brill, p. 366, Column 2.
- Thys-Şenocak, Lucienne. 1998. The Yeni Valide Mosque Complex at Eminönü. Muqarnas 15: 58–70.
- H. G. Agkun, A. Turk. (2008, March 25). Determination and analysis of site selection factors for kulliyes of architect Sinan with respect to the locations in the Ottoman city of Istanbul. Building and Environment (Vol: 43, Issue: 5), pp. 720–735
- G. Goodwin, A history of Ottoman architecture, London 1971
