= Seyyid Ali Sultan Tekke =

Historical tekke in Roussa, Greece

- Τεκκές Σεγίτ Αλί Σουλτάν
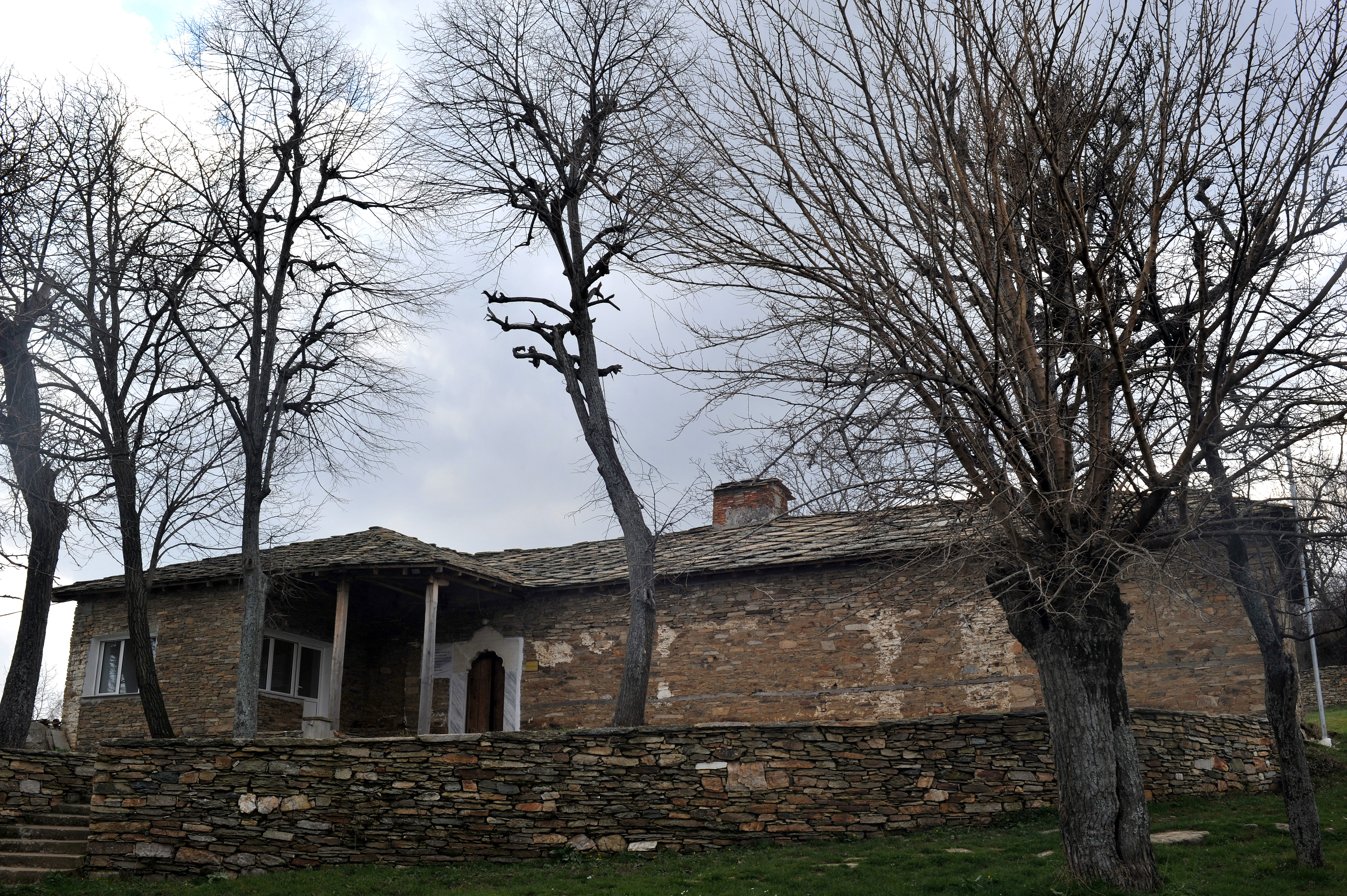
- The tekke today

- Location within Greece

General information
- Status: Tekke
- Type: Khanqah
- Architectural style: Ottoman architecture
- Classification: Protected monument
- Location: Roussa, Greece
- Coordinates: 41°17′33″N 25°59′56″E
- Opened: 1402
- Renovated: 1759, 2001

Technical details
- Material: Brick, marble, stone

Design and construction
- Developer: Seyyid Ali Sultan

The Seyyid Ali Sultan Tekke (Greek: Τεκές Σεγίτ Αλή Σουλτάν, Turkish: Seyyit Ali Sultan Tekke), also known as the Kizil Deli Tekke, or the Roussa Tekke, or the Monastery of Roussa, is a historical Ottoman tekke near the village of Roussa, in the Evros regional unit of Western Thrace in Greece. It is an Ottoman Alevi tekke, that is a gathering place for dervishes, especially those belonging to the Bektashi order. Today it has been restored and it is occasionally operational for the local community. It is considered one of the oldest preserved tekkes in the Balkan peninsula, and a very important center for Bektashism.

== Name etymology ==
The founder of the tekke, Seyyid Ali Sultan, was often called "kızıl deli", or the red madman, due to his swift and quick reflexes as a soldier. Another tradition claims that name came about because the tekke he founded stood near the Kızıl Deli river (the Erythropotamos, meaning "red river"), a tributary of the Evros river. According to another story the river took that name because it was how Seyyid Ali Sultan dubbed it while in life.

== History and usage ==
A tekke is a religious building for the members of the Bektashi order to gather. The particular tekke was built by a dervish named Seyyid Ali Sultan, after whom it took its name, around 1400-1403 AD. It was Ottoman Sultan Bayezid I (r. 1389–1402) who granted the specific site for the tekke, while the restoration date is given by an inscription in Ottoman Turkish, placed in the meydan evi building of the complex. The Ottoman inscription reads: "It was rebuilt in 804 [Hijri year, corresponding to 1402/3 AD], it was renovated in 1173 [1759/60 AD] by Dervish Ali after his desire to become a real saint, although his failings are numerous". Before its restoration in the early 200s the tekke had been used as a stable by the Christian inhabitants, causing major damage to it according to the complaint by the Union of Minority University Graduates of Western Thrace to the Organization for Security and Co-operation in Europe (OSCE). In the past, access was more difficult until a road was built which leads to the tekke.

During the Ottoman Empire, the tekkes were used by Turkish settlers as a temporary place of gathering and housing before they were sent to other places. Beginning in late fourteenth century the tekkes in the wider Evros area were used to control and guard the roads, and also enjoyed tax exemptions. The Seyyid Ali Sultan Tekke was used to guard the mountain passage from the Rhodopes to the towns of Soufli and Didymoteicho. Since 2002, the site has been managed and maintained by the "Administrative Committee for the Protection of the Seyyid Ali Sultan Waqf".

== Architecture ==
In the center of the tekke stands a 600-year-old mulberry tree, whose berries according to religious tradition are miraculous. The tradition goes that should someone eat berries from this tree, they would be protected from all diseases and maladies. The same tree also exists in the central meeting place of the Bektashi order, in the village of Hacıbektaş in central Asia Minor. The tekke complex buildings are arranged all around the tree; the kitchens, where during the holidays meals are cooked for the multitude of visitors; the konak (guest house), today where the türbedar (the caretaker of the site) lives with his family (Muslim Çolak); a türbe, meaning the burial monument-mausoleum of Seyyid Ali Sultan; the prayer area (meydan evi) and finally recent facilities with shared toilets for visitors. Many dervishes and sheikhs (philosophers) are buried in the cemetery.

South of the tekke, around one kilometer away, two large cemeteries are found, with tombs dating to the sixteenth and eighteenth centuries. A meydan evi is also present, and many inhabitants of the tekke are buried there.

== Celebrations ==
Today, especially during the period of May till August, the site is visited by the faithful from the neighboring villages. According to George Mauromatis the tekke is visited even by Christians due to curiosity and the realization that Bektashism played a great part during the Ottoman period. Saint George is renevated every year in the tekke, a joint celebration common to Christians and Alevis alike, on May 6 (according to the old calendar), in the presence of, among others, the Metropolitan of Didymoteicho, Orestiada and Soufli. The celebration is accompanied by kourbania and gatherings.

== Gallery ==
Buildings of the Tekke
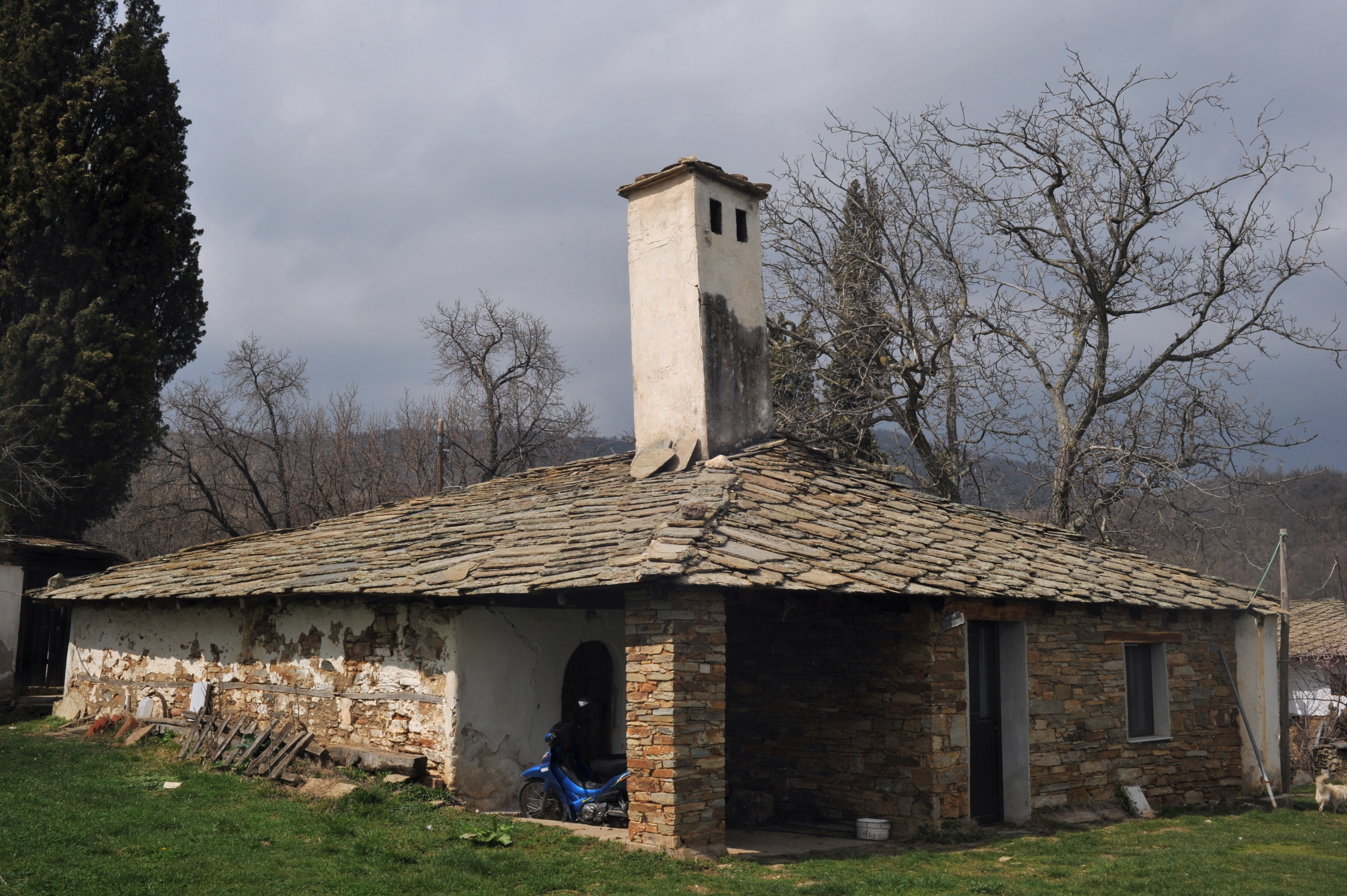
Kitchens

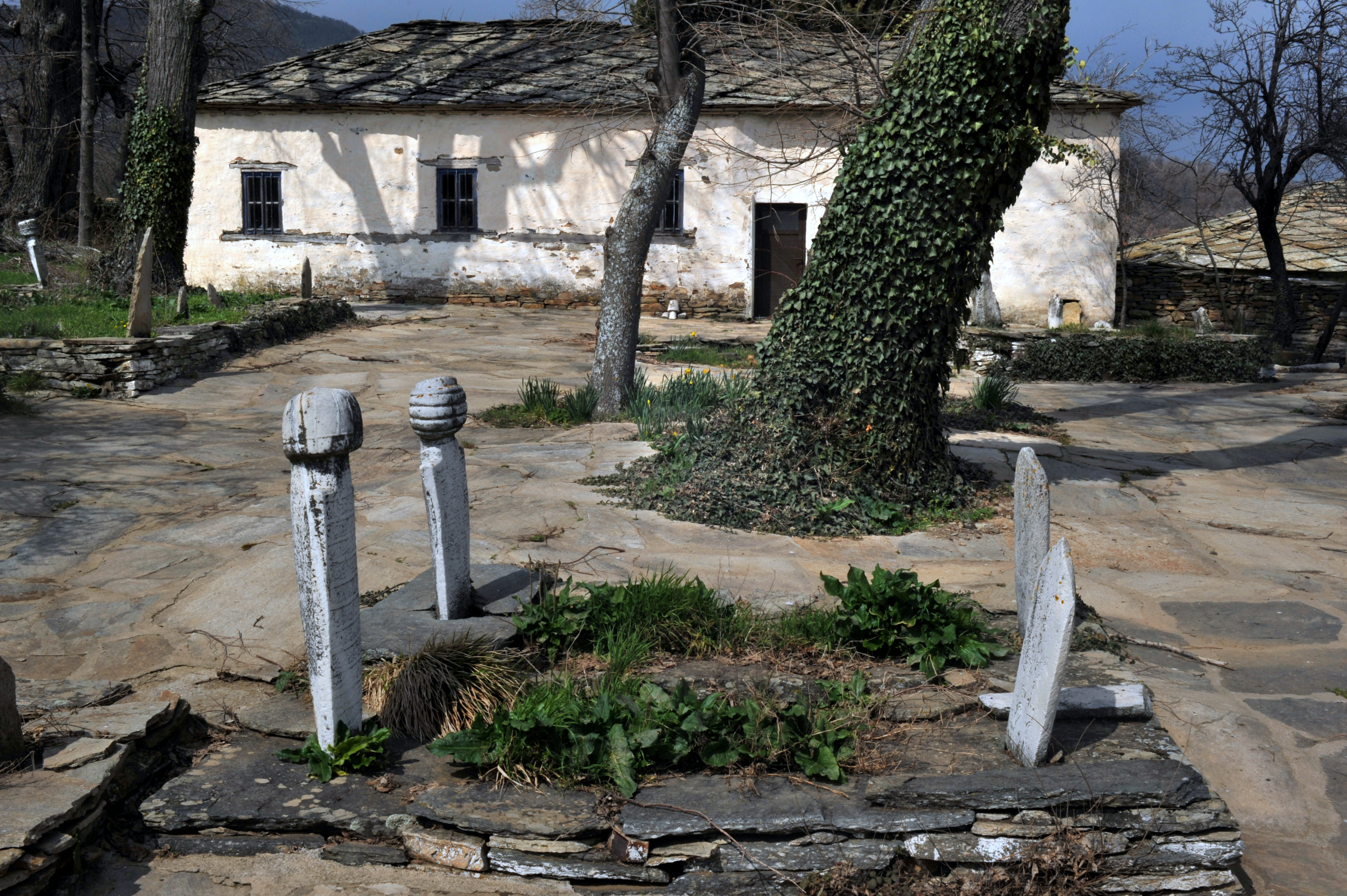
Turbe (tomb)

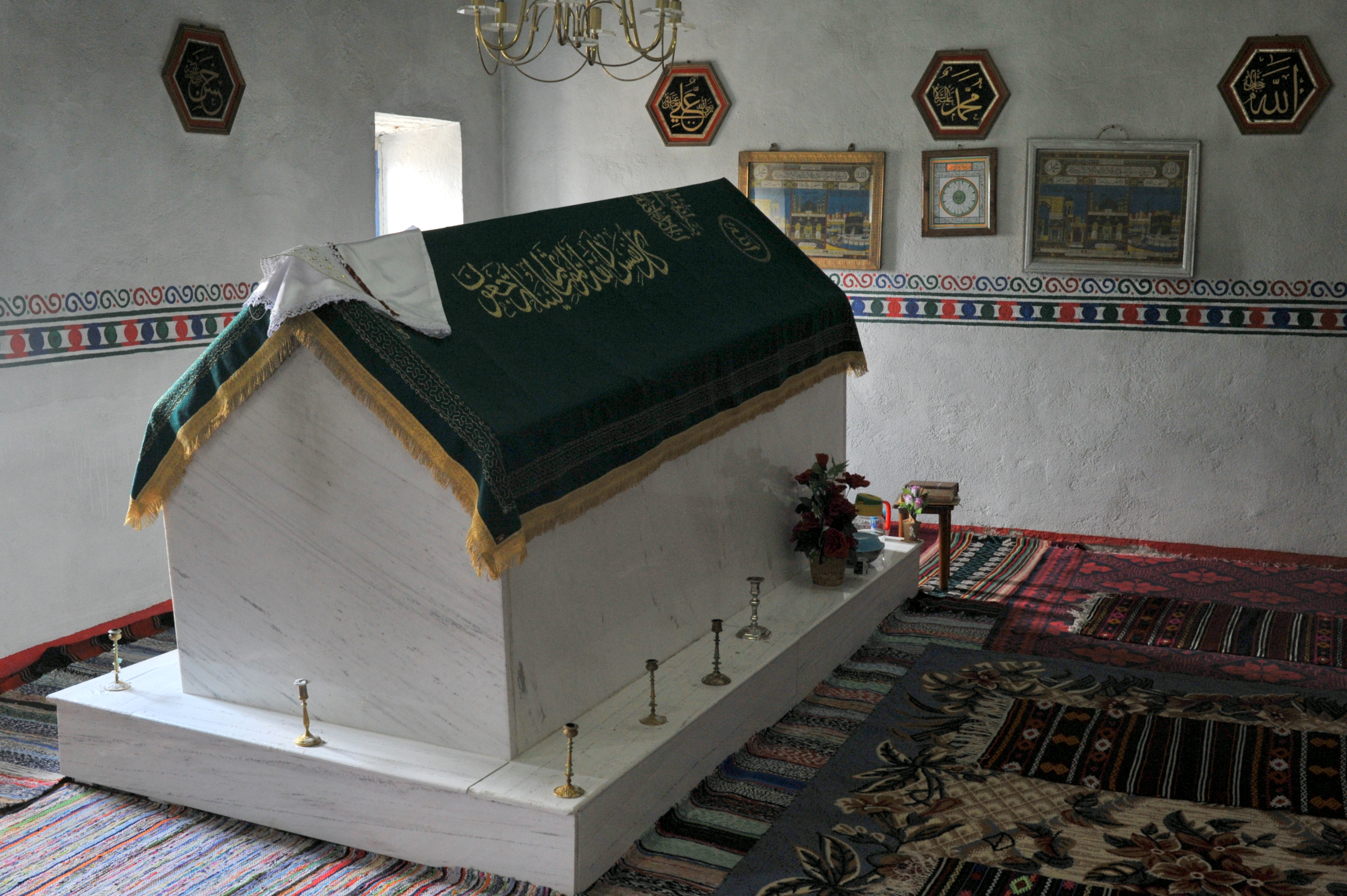
Turbe of Seyyid Ali Sultan

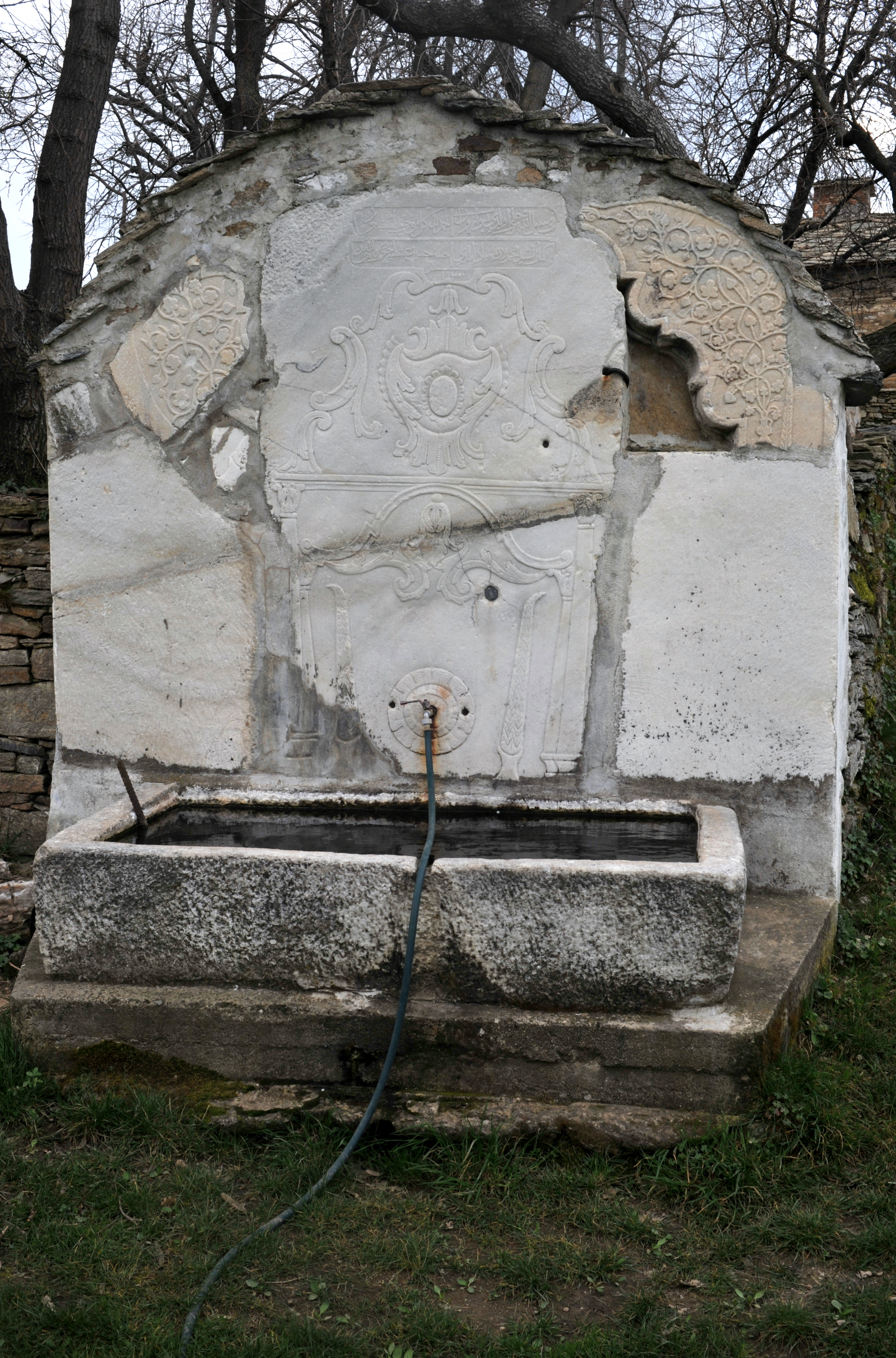
Fountain underneath the mulberry tree

== See also ==
- Hayriyye Madrasa
- Imaret of Komotini
- Imaret (Kavala)
- Clock tower of Xanthi
- Kütüklü Baba Tekke

== Bibliography ==
- Ζεγκίνης, Ευστράτιος (1985). "Ο Μπεκτασισμός στη Δ. Θράκη - Συμβολή στην ιστορία της διαδόσεως του μουσουλμανισμού στον ελλαδικό χώρο (Διδακτορική διατριβή)". Αριστοτέλειο Πανεπιστήμιο Θεσσαλονίκης (ΑΠΘ).
- Lowry, Heath W. (2009). In the Footsteps of the Ottomans: A Search for Sacred Spaces & Architectural Monuments in Northern Greece]. Istanbul: Mary Martin Booksellers / Bahçesehir University Publications. ISBN 9789756437865.
- Vallidis, Stavros (2012). Αλληλεπιδράσεις μεταξύ Χριστιανών και Μουσουλμάνων στη Μικρά Ασία την περίοδο της Οθωμανικής Αυτοκρατορίας. Το δερβίσικο τάγμα των Μπεκτασήδων και Κιζιλμπάσιδων (PDF) (Thesis) (in Greek). Θεσσαλονίκη: Θεολογική Σχολή Αριστοτέλειου Πανεπιστήμιου Θεσσαλονίκης.
