= Imaret (Kavala) =

Former Islamic monument and current hotel in Kavala, Greece

Imaret of Kavala (Muhammad Ali Pasha Mosque)
- Ιμαρέτ της Καβάλας
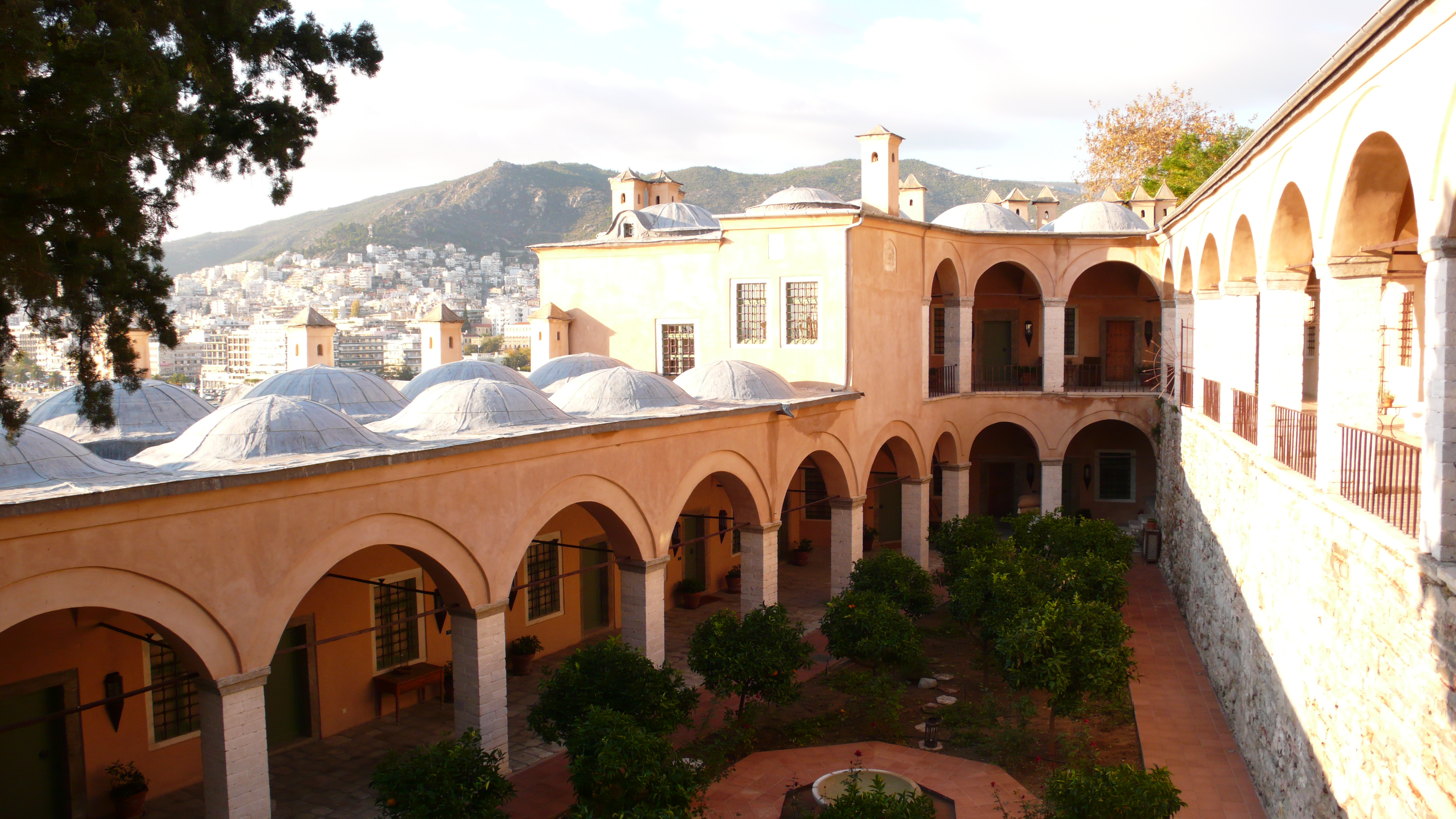
- The former külliye, as a hotel

- Location of the former külliye in Greece

Religion
- Affiliation: Islam (former)
- Ecclesiastical or organizational status: Mosque; madrasa; imaret (1530–1960s)
- Status: Abandoned (as a külliye); Repurposed (as a hotel)

Location
- Location: Poulidou street, Kavala
- Country: Greece
- Interactive map of Imaret of Kavala (Muhammad Ali Pasha Mosque)
- Coordinates: 40°56′0″N 24°24′49″E

Architecture
- Type: Mosque
- Style: Ottoman
- Founder: Muhammad Ali Pasha
- Completed: 1813 (original); 2001 (renovation)

Specifications
- Length: 120 m (390 ft)
- Interior area: 4,200 m^{2} (45,000 sq ft)
- Domes: 1 (main); many (others)
- Materials: Stone; brick; marble
- imaret.gr (in Greek)

The Kavala Imaret (Greek: Ιμαρέτ της Καβάλας) is a former külliye is located in the old town of Kavala, in the Eastern Macedonia and Thrace region of Greece. Founded by Muhammad Ali Pasha in the early 19th century, in the Ottoman era, the complex was progressively abandoned until the imaret ceased functioning in 1960s. Since 2004 the monument has functioned as a hotel. The structure is considered to be one of the greatest landmarks of Kavala, and among the most important Ottoman landmarks in Greece.

It was built in the old town of Kavala, on top of pre-existing Byzantine walls in the Panagia peninsula of the port. Its founder was Muhammad Ali, a Kavala native who later rose to be the de facto ruler of Egypt. It is a large complex, which consisted of madrasas, a mekteb (Qur'anic primary school), the imaret, mesjids, a wudu, and several other facilities for the town's Islamic population.

== History ==
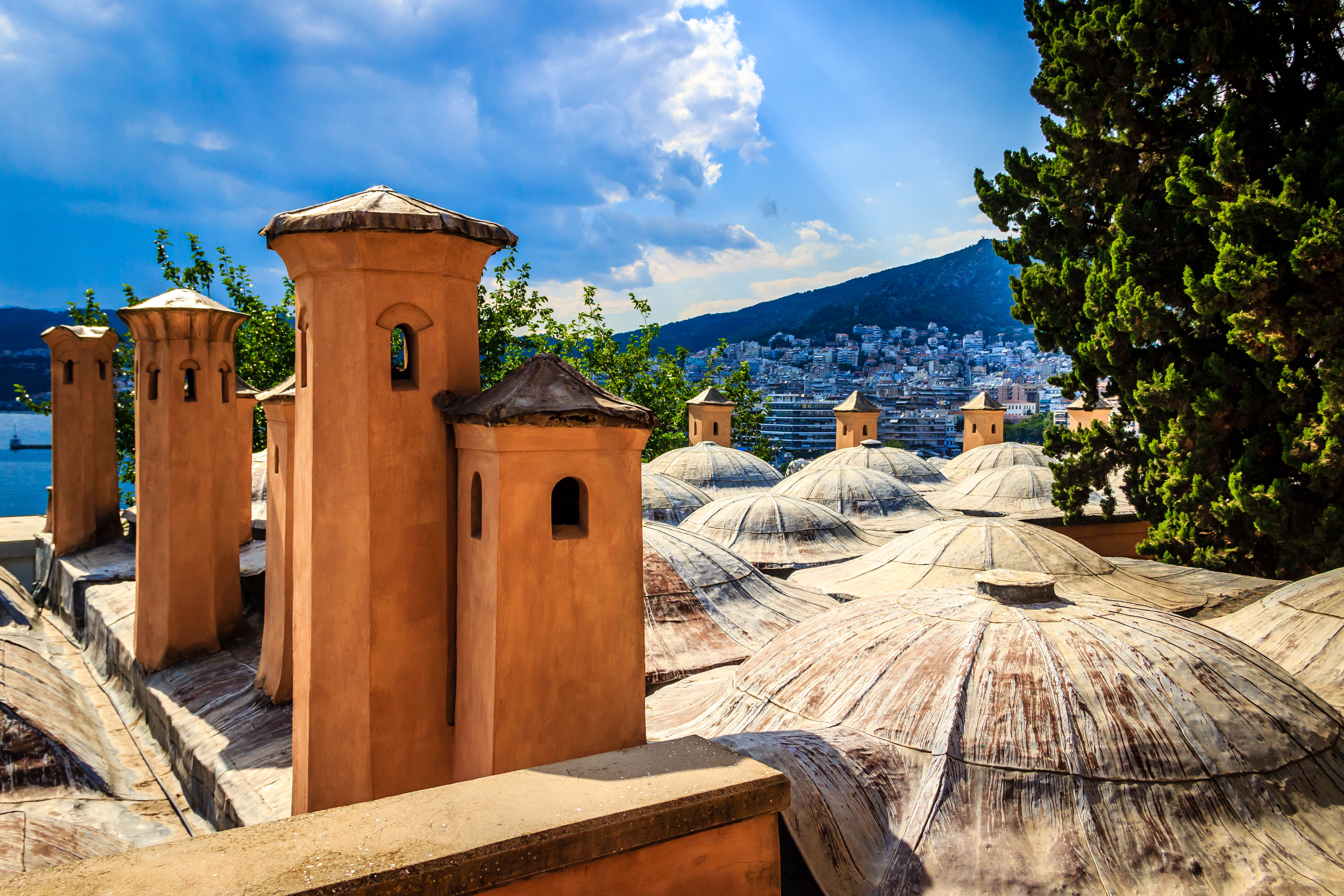
Rooftop domes

=== Ottoman era ===
The founder of the imaret was Kavala-born Muhammad Ali Pasha, who ordered the construction of the foundation as a "gift" to his birthplace in 1813. Built just below the fortifications in the heart of the old town of Kavala, the imaret supported the educational, social and religious needs of the Islamic population of Kavala. The English traveller George Frederick Abbott, who visited Kavala in 1901, described it as a "hybrid of school and kitchen."

Although dedicated to traditional Islamic curriculum and sciences, the kitchens accepted all students and travellers, regardless of religion. It is one of the earliest examples of western-style school providing secular education in the Ottoman Empire, in accordance with Muhammad Ali's efforts for modernization.

The complex used to house rare editions of Ottoman, Turkish and Persian manuscripts, dating from the 12th century. It has been suggested that the manuscripts were either stolen or destroyed, though it is also claimed that perhaps, following Greco-Turkish turmoil in the 1820s, the Egyptian community transferred them to Egypt instead. As time passed, the education and charity purposes of the imaret declined. It is known that the school continued to function until 1902, and the kitchen until 1923.

=== Greece ===
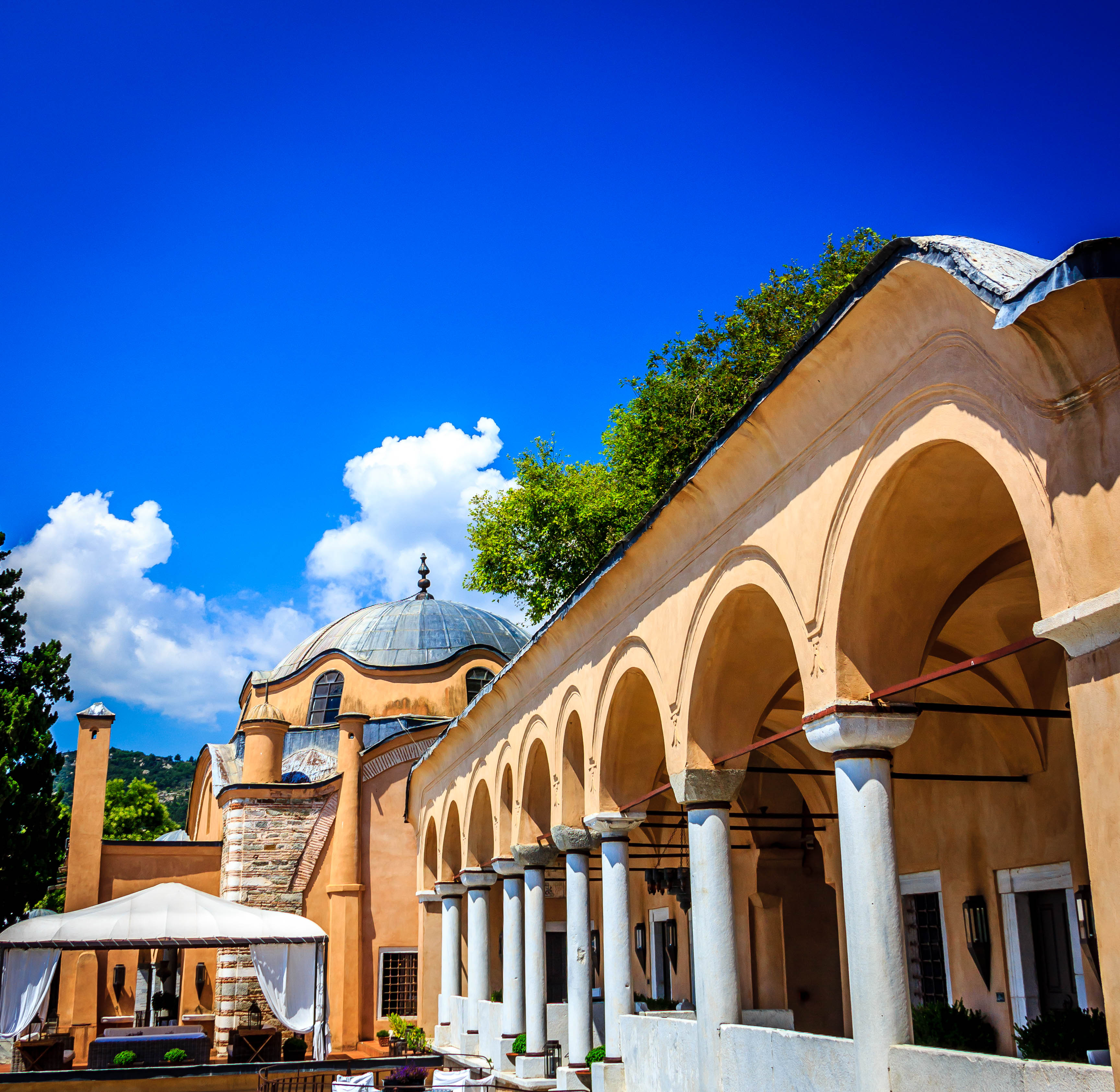
Arches in the courtyard.

The imaret, along with the rest of the town of Kavala, became part of modern Greece on June 26, 1913, following the victory of the Balkan League against the Ottoman Empire in the Balkan Wars.

Following the defeat of Greece in the 1919-1922 Greco-Turkish war and the exchange of populations between Greece and the newly founded republic of Turkey, several Greek refugees from Asia Minor arriving in Greece were housed in the imaret until as late as 1960s. In 1954, the imaret along with the house of Muhammad Ali were declared protected historical monuments, and recognized as Egyptian waqfs by the Greek state.

Following the departure of the last Greek refugees, the building fell into disarray. One of the courtyards was converted into a tavern, some cells were turned into storage areas, parts of the lead roofs were stripped down, as were the Ottoman crescents that decorated the domes. The building slowly experience decline, though its foundations supported the structure, preventing its potential collapse.

The decision to preserve and restore the imaret was made by Kavala resident Anna Missirian in the mid-1990s, in spite of the enormous cost and difficulties she faced in procedure. Missirian leased the imaret from the Egyptian government, as it is still part of the Egyptian waqf property in Greece. After 22 months of intensive work the restoration was finished. Since 2004, the imaret has operated as a hotel.

== Architecture ==
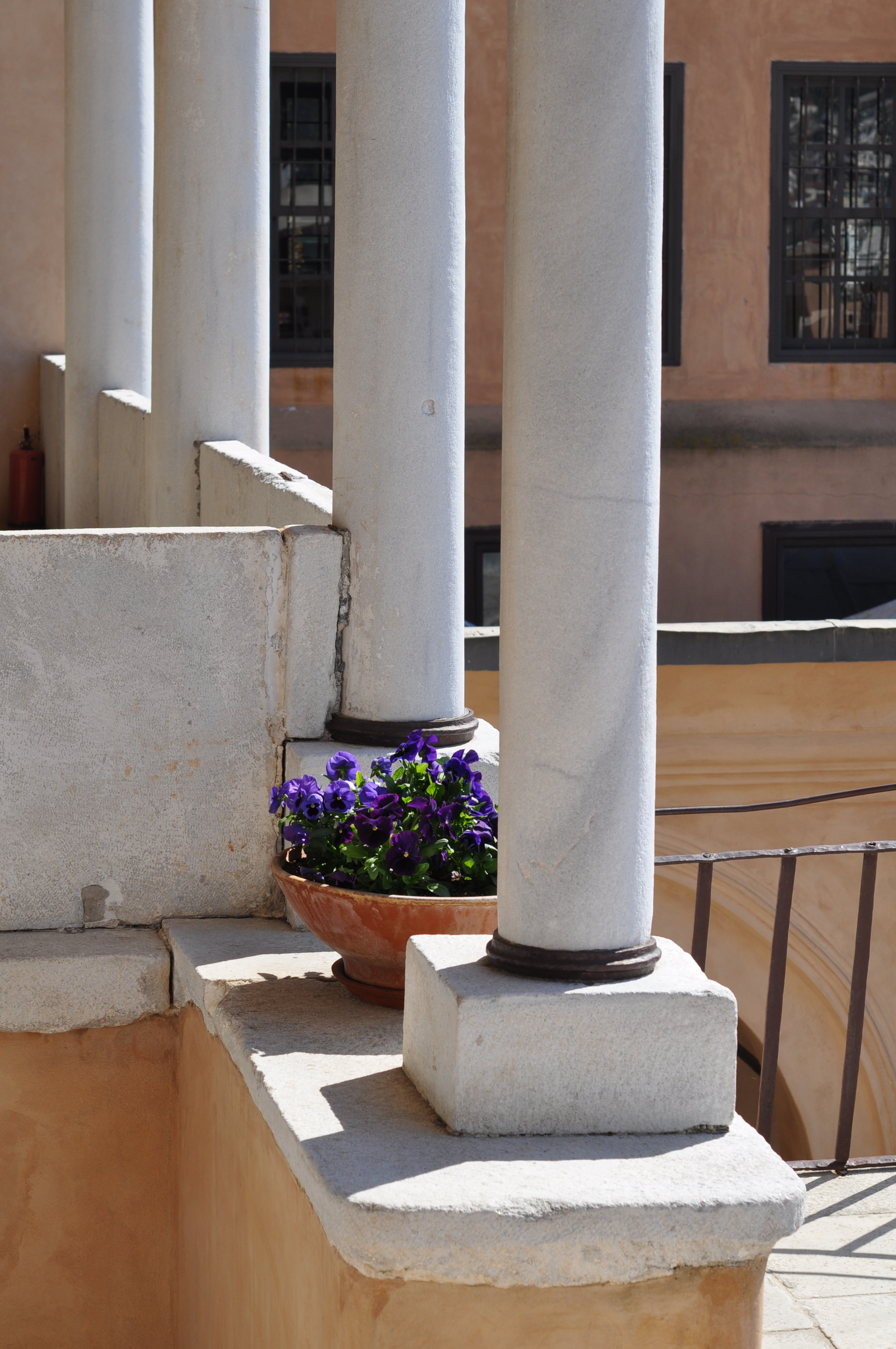
Columns

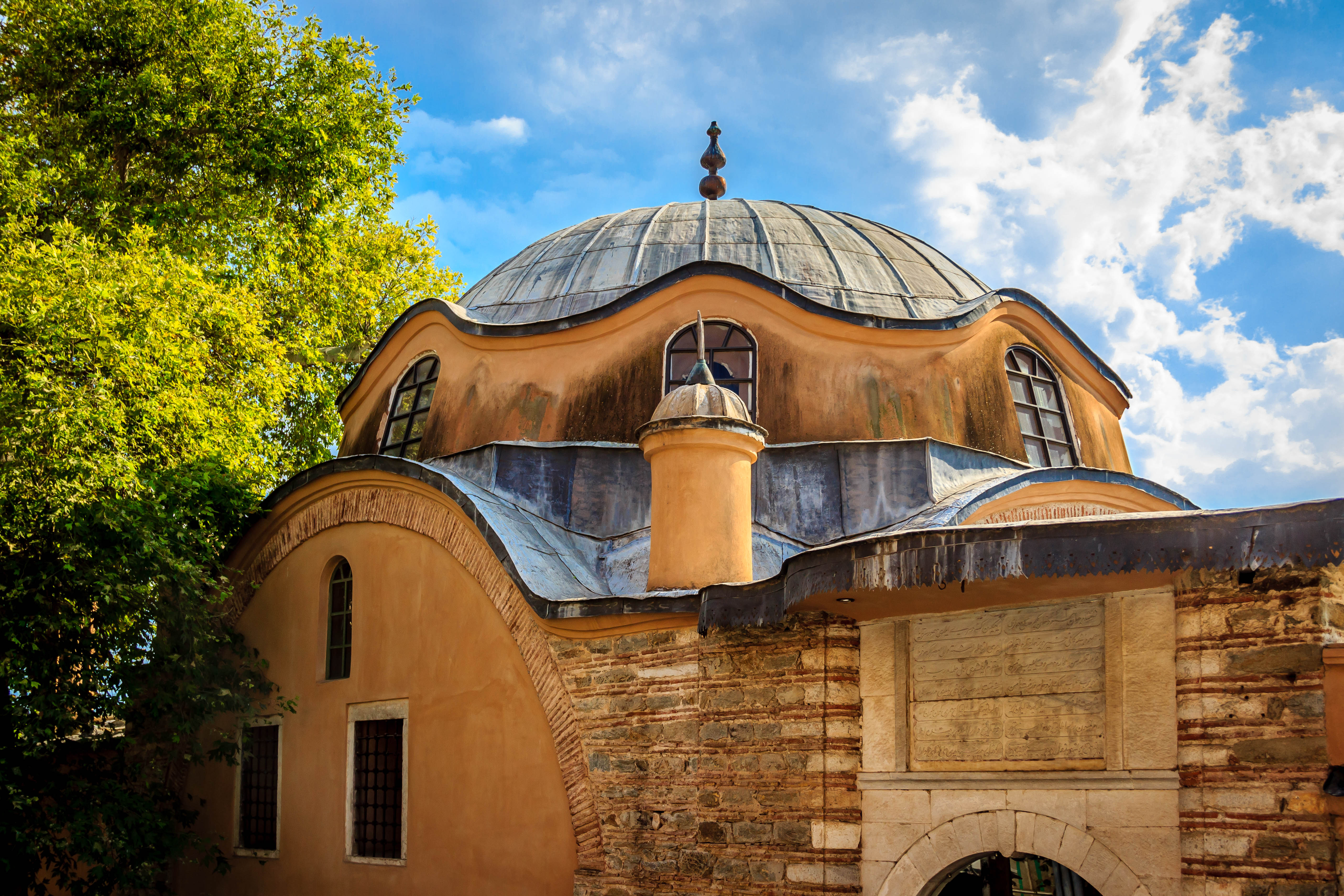
Dome of the former mosque

The imaret is a large structure, that is 120 metres (390 ft) long and with an area of 4,200 square metres (45,000 sq ft).

The roof of the imaret is an array of lead domes. Soft curves and arches are also present everywhere else in the large complex: in all the bedrooms each courtyard, a polygonal-like curval rhytmn is the dominant style. The enclosed gardens also display a series of contiguous domes.

Externally, from the seaside, the imaret lies on top of the old Byzantine walls of Kavala. Although the building was built in the Ottoman Baroque style, where Western influence was popular in the East, it keeps unchanged the basic principles of this architecture.

The complex included a mekteb, two madrasas and two dershane-masjids. It has 61 rooms that used to accommodate for up to 300 students, and are now used as the hotel suites. It also housed two study halls, a library, and a printing press. In order to meet the religious and hygiene needs of its occupants, the imaret contained a praying hall, a hamam, a cistern and fountains.

The multiple columns are mostly made of brick and sometimes marble. Some capitals have floral motifs. The floors are either paved or made of marble slabs. Trees, plants and moving water, gardens in general, are a self-evident image in the courtyards of Islamic buildings.

For the religious needs of the community, the imaret housed a single-dome mosque, the Muhammad Ali Pasha Mosque, fittingly named after the founder of the building. The mosque is no longer open for worship.

== Gallery ==
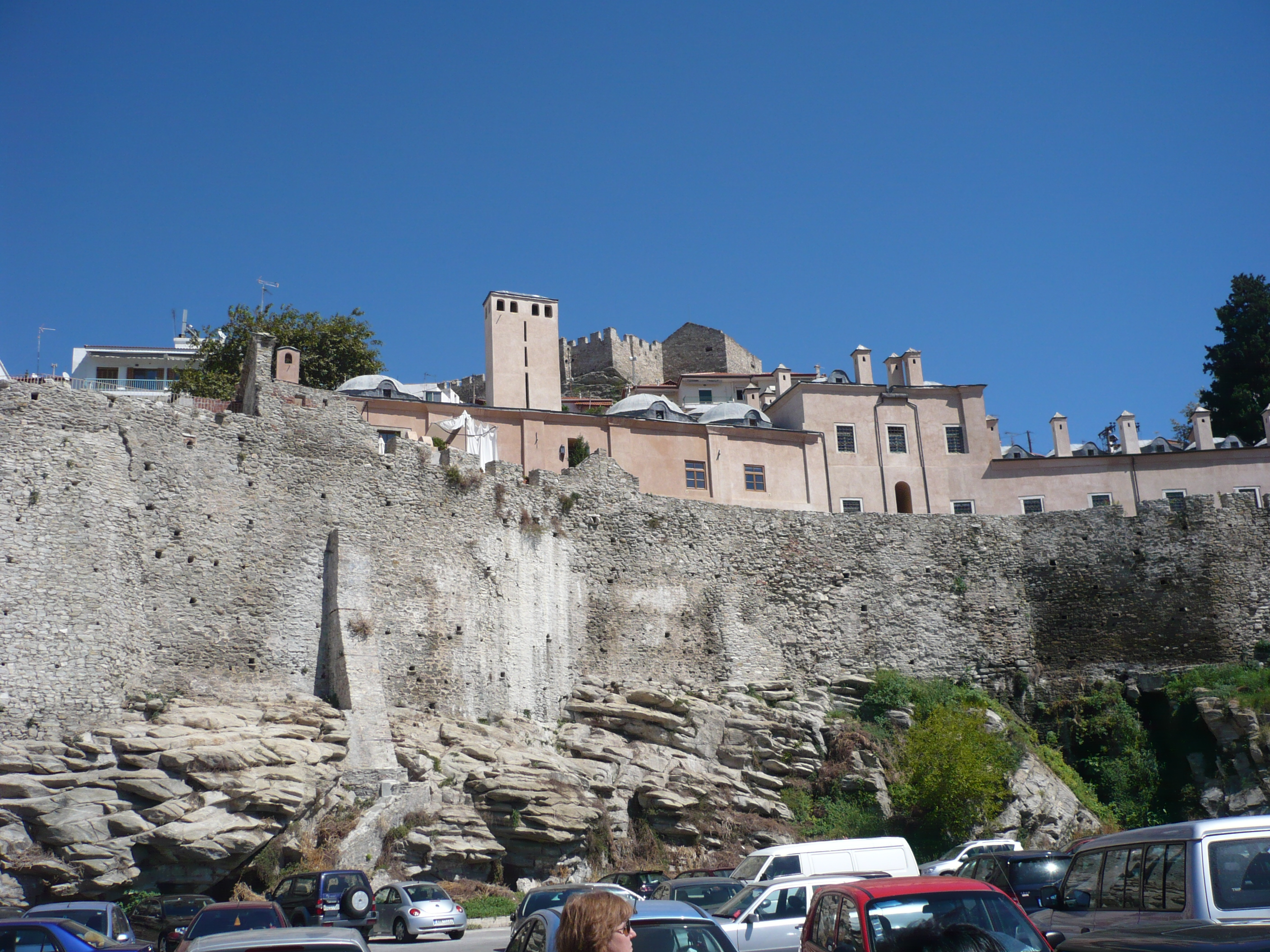
Imaret on the old town wall

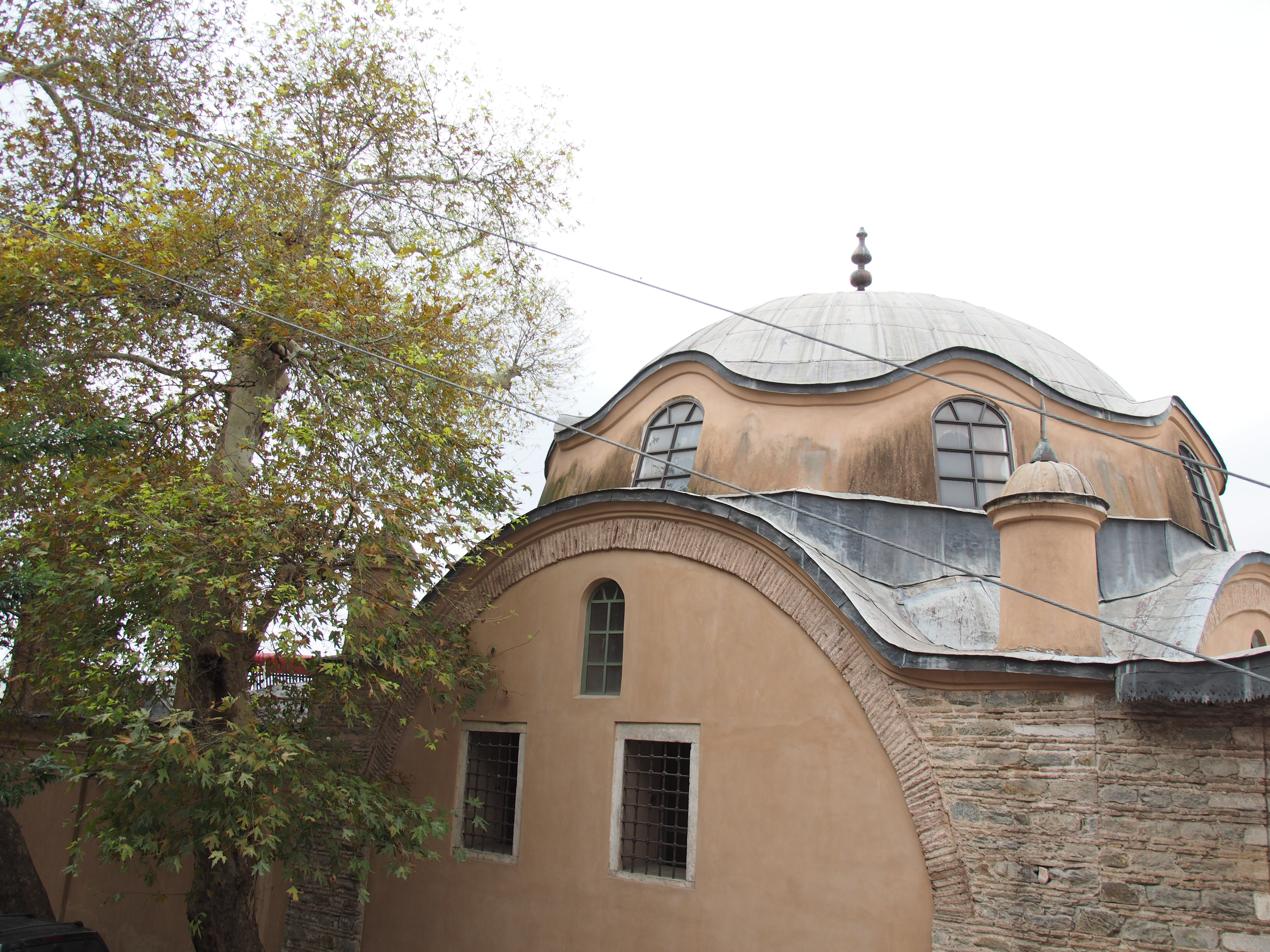
Muhammad Ali Pasha Mosque

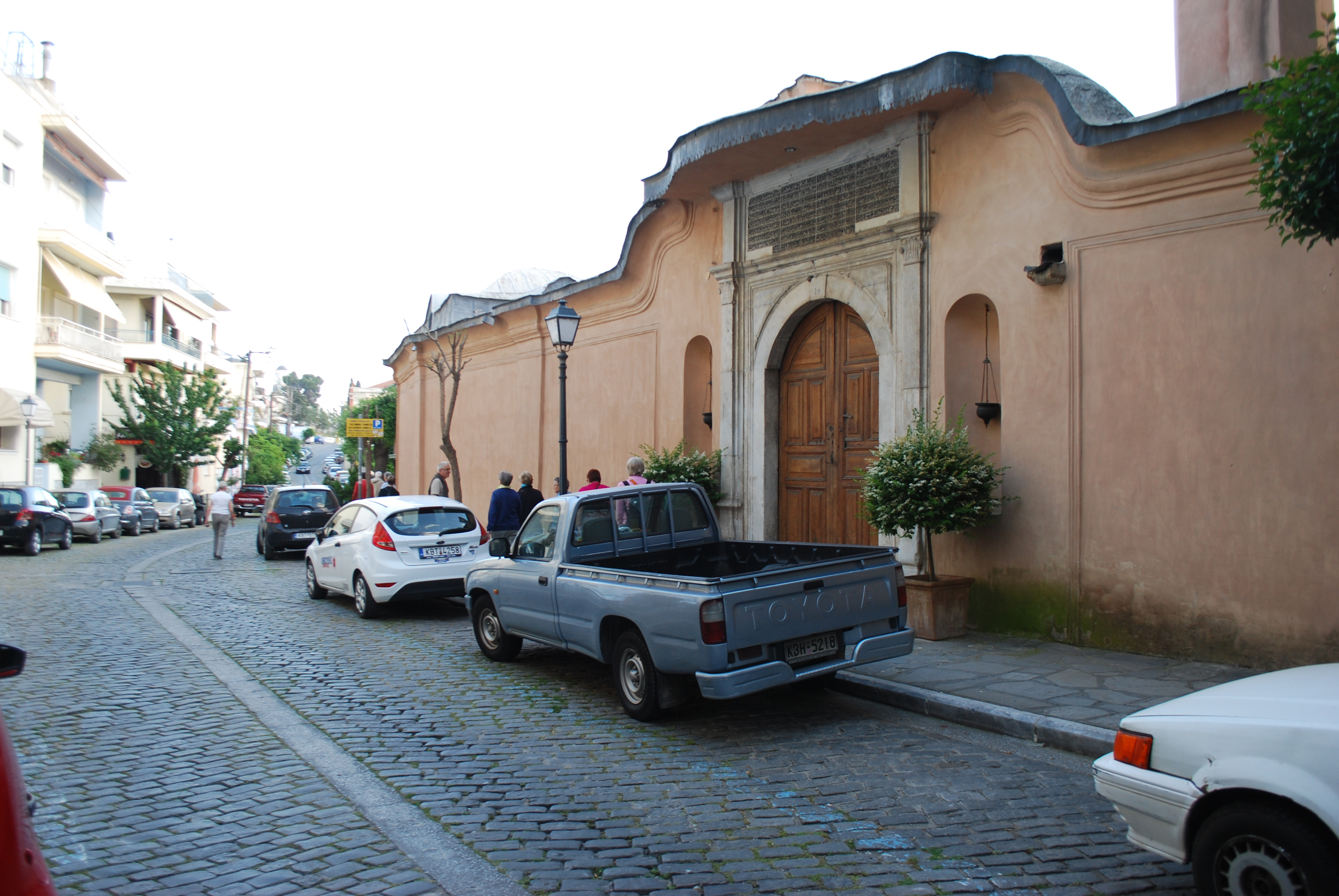
Entrance

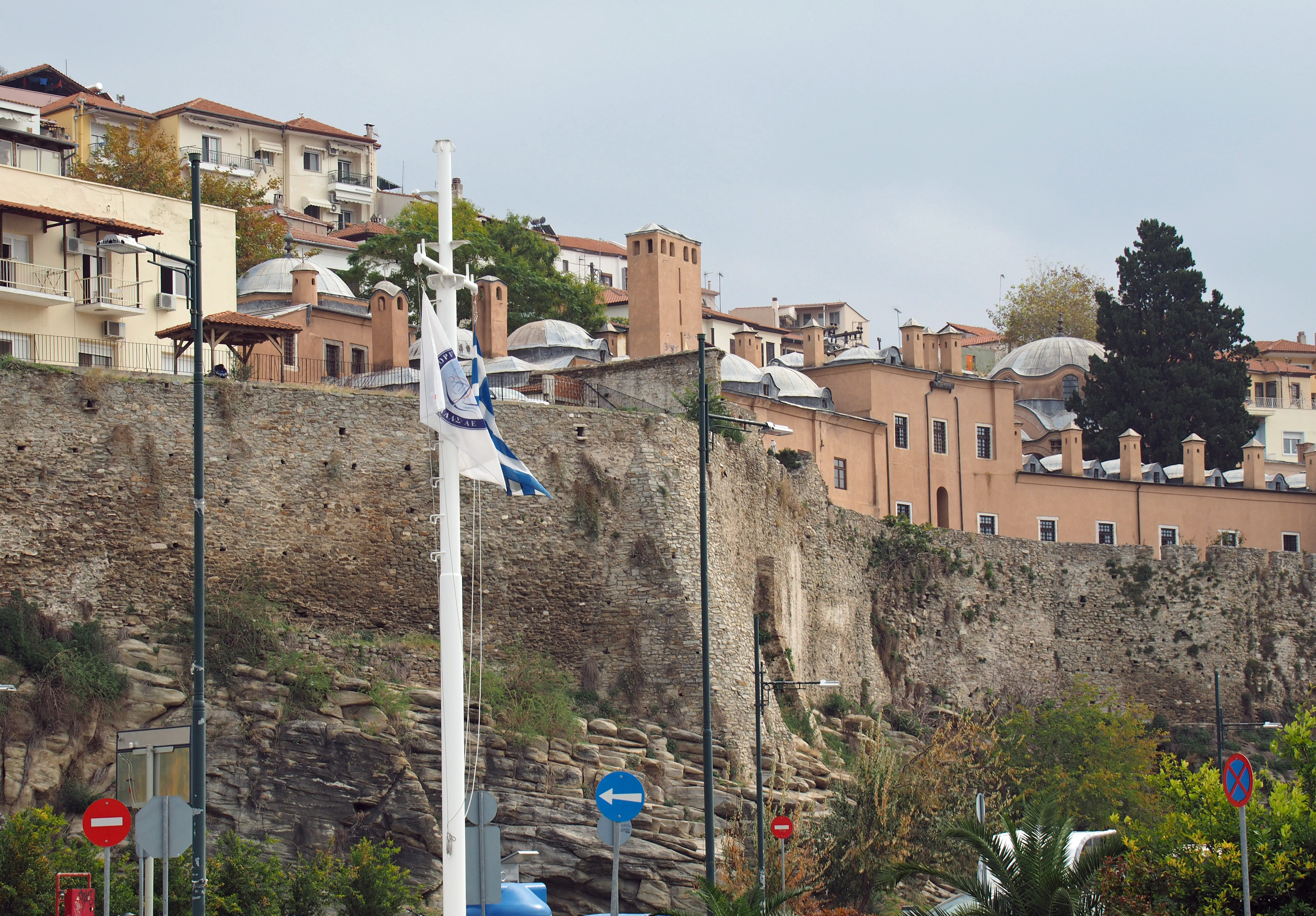
Exterior view

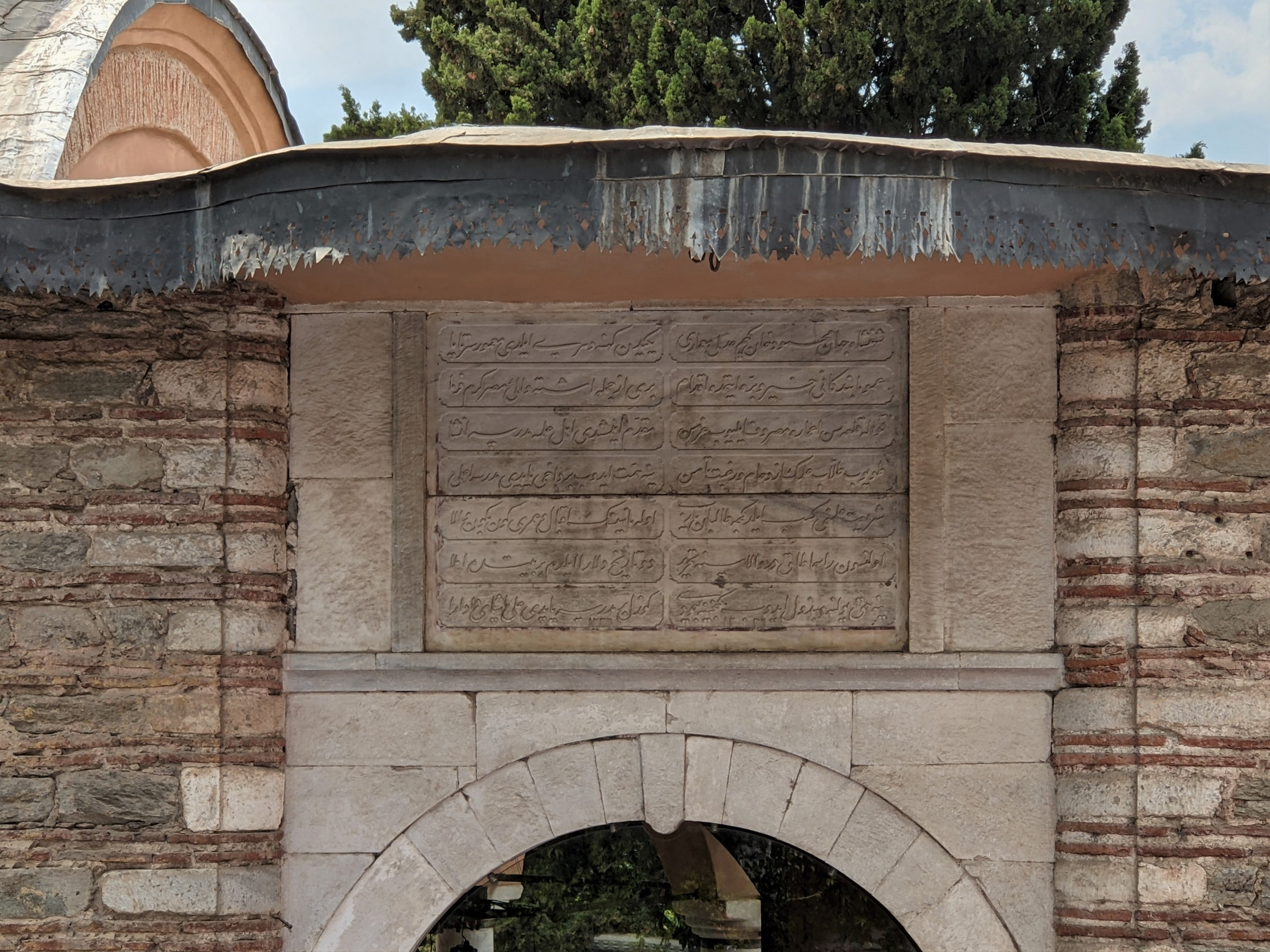
Inscription in Arabic

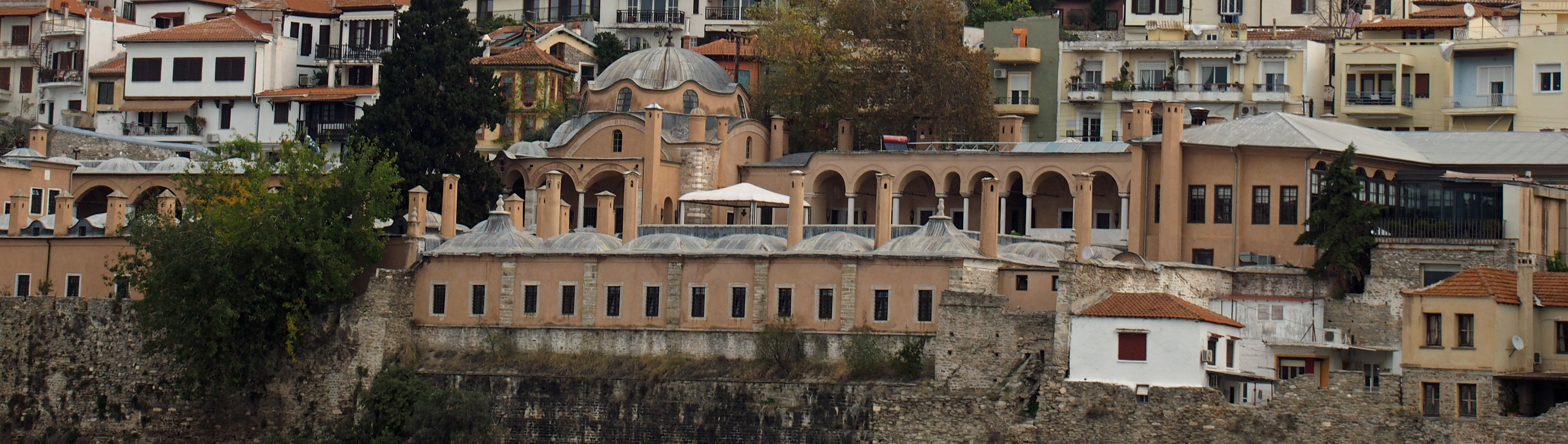
View from the port

== See also ==
- Islam in Greece
- List of former mosques in Greece
- List of madrasas in Greece
- Ottoman Greece
- Mihrişah Sultan Complex
- Seyyid Ali Sultan Tekke
