= Beer in Greece =

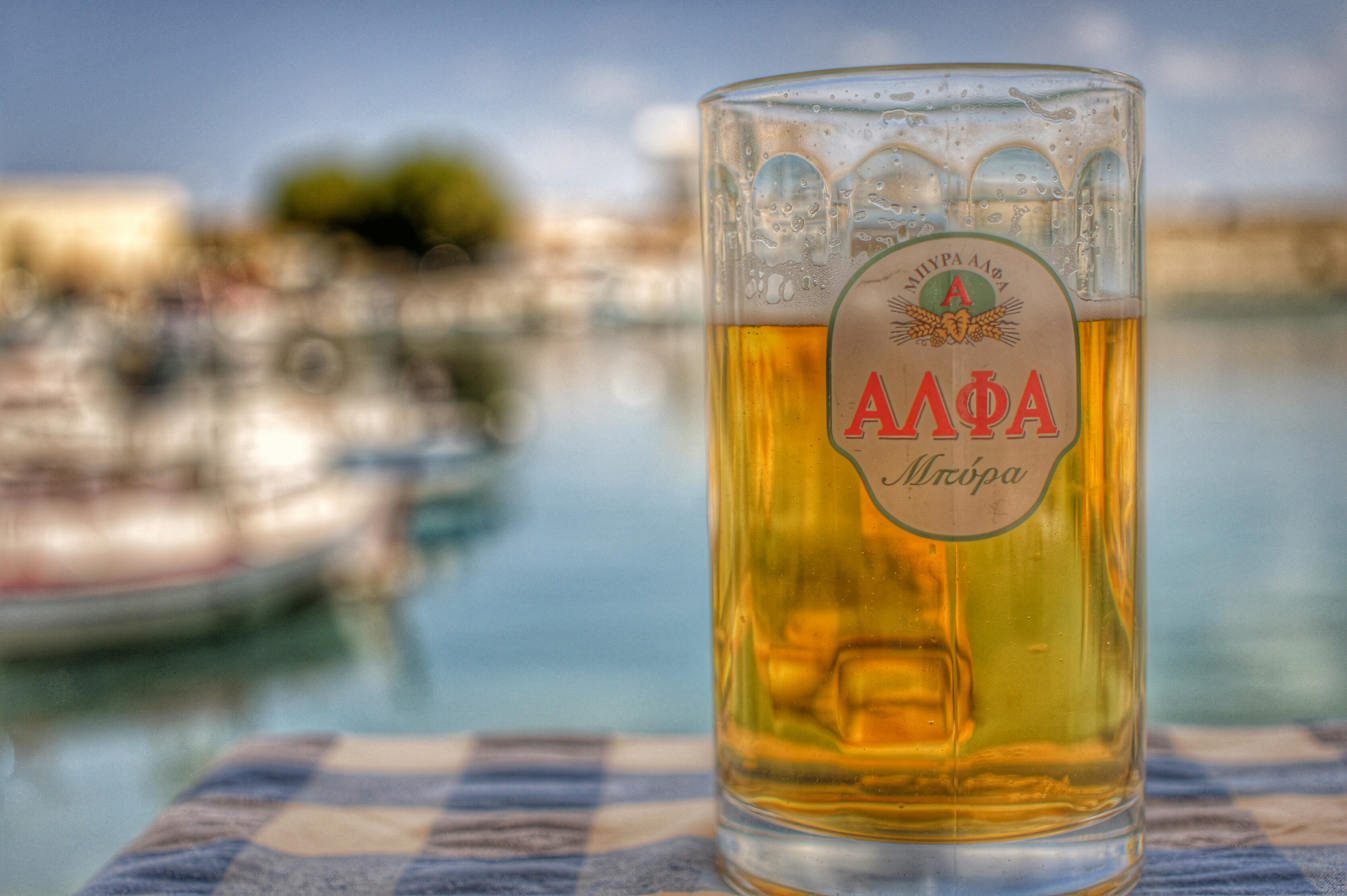
Beer in Greece

Archaeological excavations have exposed artifacts and materials used for the production of beer in Greece dating back to the Bronze Age (3,300 to 1,200 BC).

The first modern Greek brewery was founded in 1864. Greek beer has become a part of the local culture and expanded beyond its borders as demand has increased. Although wine still has the highest consumption rates within Greece, beer has increased its market share and become an important industry for the Greek economy, providing more than 60,000 jobs in 2005.

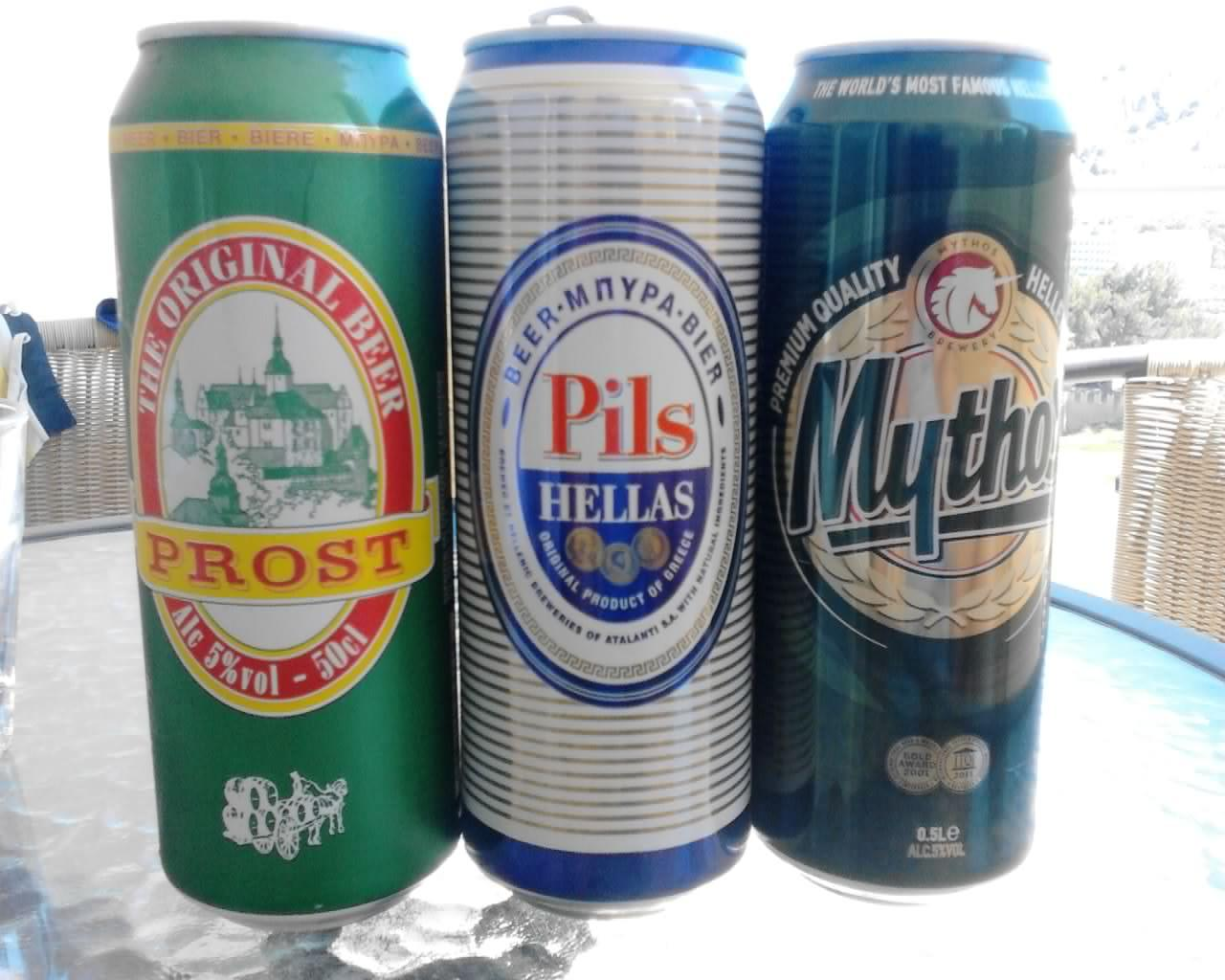
Three tins of Greek beers

== History ==
Alcohol consumption has always been a part of the culture in Greece, although it has adapted and changed in certain aspects over the generations. Initially Greece had a strong wine drinking culture. This culture adapted and developed as beer and spirits begun to grow in popularity.

=== B.C. ===
The Ancient Egyptians were the first to show evidence of beer consumption as they documented the brewing process on papyrus scrolls, dating back to 5,000 B.C. This process made its way from the Middle East, into European countries. Greece was one of these countries as remains associated with beer have been discovered which date back to 2135-2020 BC. Beer in Europe became more popular in the northern parts of Europe rather than Greece, as the northern crops provided key ingredients for brewers. Due to the popularity growth of Beer in the north, Greece would prefer to be associated with wine, as they often referred to northerners as ‘barbarians’.

==== Remains of Prehistoric Sites ====
Archaeologists discovered the remains of two prehistoric buildings, providing materials to which can be used for the development and consumption of beer. A site was discovered at Archondiko (in northern Greece) and another at Agrissa (south of Archondiko on the eastern side of Greece). Remains suggest that these sites burnt down in a fire, allowing artifacts found inside to be preserved for a rather long period of time. Within the Archondiko site several cereals were discovered that date back to the “Early Bronze Age, phase IV, dated to 2135–2020 BC”, and are key determinants in the brewing of beer. Soultana Maria Valamoti published the findings in a 2018 article, including: “Triticum monococcum (einkorn), T. dicoccum (emmer), T. spelta (spelt wheat), T. aestivum/durum (free-threshing wheat) and Hordeum sp. (barley) which were found in dense, sometimes pure, concentrations indicating deliberate storage.”

Additionally to these cereals a two-chambered structure was discovered at this site. This structure is said to support temperatures of around 100 degrees Celsius, which is essential in the beer making process. Accompanying this structure there was a discovery of 30 special cups which archaeologists believe may have been used for the consumption of the beer.

Similarly to the Archondiko site the site within Agrissa was well preserved and provides instruments for beer production In Greece. The evacuation of this site was conducted in 1955, 1956 and 1958 by a German archaeologist team. Similar cereal grains were discovered as Valamoti mentions within her article, "the archaeobotanical remains from Argissa discussed here consist of at least 3,588 sprouted cereal grains that were identified to einkorn (2,319); a further 157 sprouted grains were identified as T. dicoccum (emmer) and 81 as Hordeum (barley)”.

These cereal grains are said to date back 1700–1500 BC, whilst other remains of the house are said to date back 2100–1700 BC. This is of similar time period to that of the site in Archondiko. Within the Argissa site 45 specially sculpted cups were discovered, which is another similarity between the two sites.

Fix beer logo, derived from the Fix (Fuchs) family

=== Modern history ===
The wine culture was prominent all the way until the 1800s. In 1832 the first king of Greece, Otto of Greece, settled in Greece. Otto came with scientists and specialists from his native land Bavaria, with the intentions of developing the beer industry. Initially small breweries were set up in the 1840s to serve Bavarian officials and military men who were stationed there at the time.

Among the Bavarian settlers, was Johann Ludwig Fuchs who established a small enterprise selling home-brewed beer from his house in Kolonaki. It was in 1864 when Charles Johann Fuchs, son of Johann Ludwig Fuchs, established Fix brewery in Athens, the first official brewery of Greece. Finding Beer in Greece among this time was a rarity, and was only available within the major cities. Travelers in the 1900s from Germany allowed beer consumption to continue to grow. Similar German breweries were founded in Greece, such as, Messrs. Melcher, Bachauer, Fischer, Klein, and others.

The 1900s numerous breweries were formed and beer consumption begun to grow. Within the late 19th century micro-breweries began to flourish all around Greece, which can be reflected by the consumption rates. The following table depicts the transition in the alcohol preference of the Greek nation from 1961 to 2016. Wine remains the predominant drink in Greece, though to a lesser degree than before.

Alcohol consumption transition
	Beer	Wine	Spirits
1961	6.86%	86.14%	7.00%
2005	24.20%	49.61%	26.18%
2016	31.5%	45.5%	21.8%

Beer consumption has continually grown, increasing by a factor of five since the 1960s. Most brands are found all over Greece and are sold in supermarkets, mini markets and kiosks.

== Consumption ==
Beer in Greece is consumed nationally, as breweries are spread across the nation. Beer consumption in 2014 came to 3.845 million hectolitres, or 36 litres per capita. 440,000 of these hectolitres was imported to Greece. About 406,000 was imported from within the EU and the remaining 34,000 was imported externally. Looking on the production side of things, beer production in 2014 came to 3.75 million hectolitres. About 229,000 of these hectolitres were exported. Some 67,000 were exported within the EU and the remaining 162,000 were exported outside of the EU.

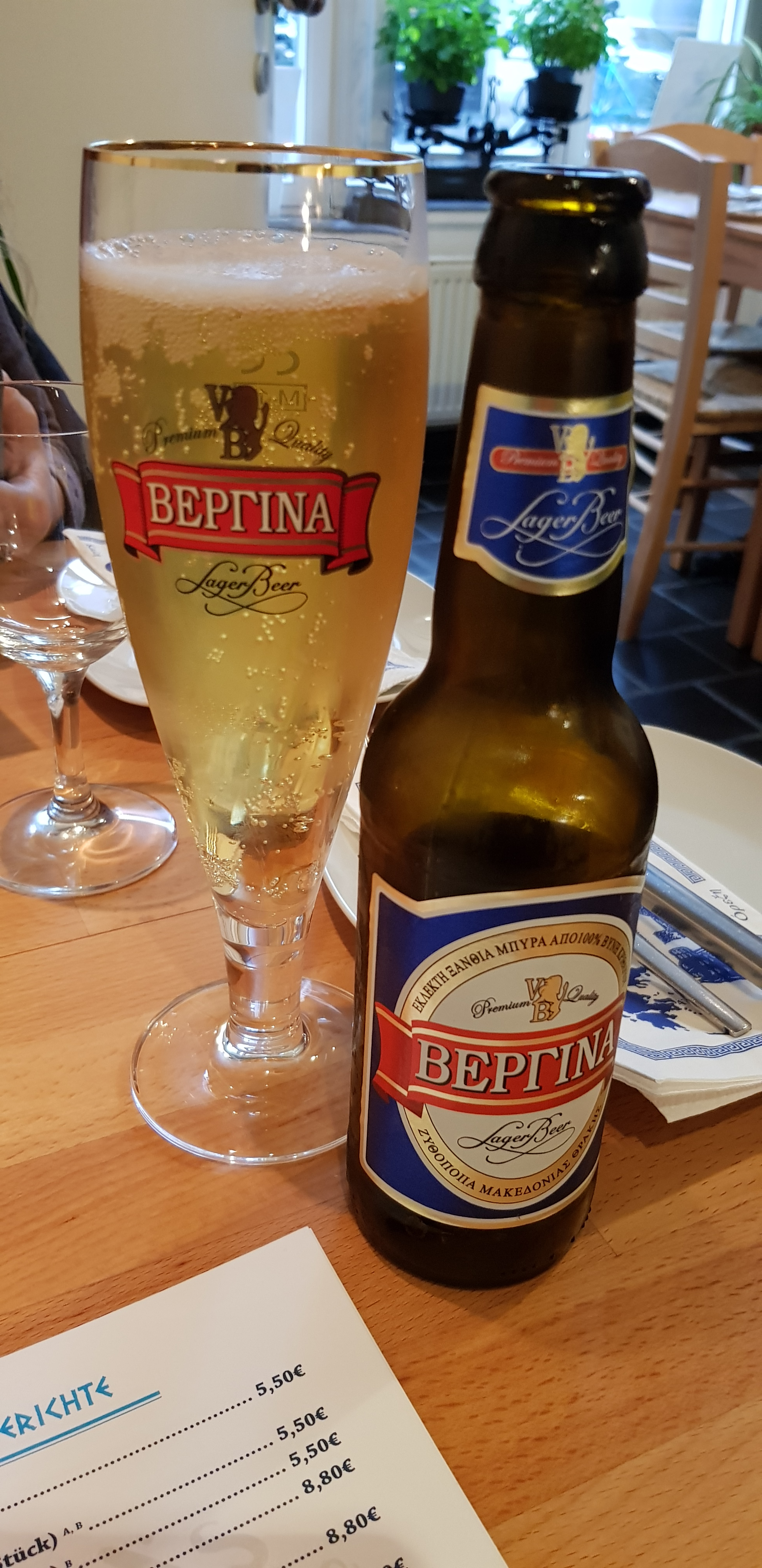
Greek Vergina Beer Bottle & Glass by Macedonian Thrace Brewery

=== Popular Beers ===
A survey conducted by 510 residents from all over Greece by Avgeris et al. Concluded that the three most influential factors when purchasing beer in Greece are: price, origin and brand name. Price is considered to be the most significant factor influencing consumer choice surrounding Greek beer. The survey concluded that 50.6% of the public would rather buy ‘cheaper’ beer as opposed to their local. However, if money was ruled out of the equation, the public would prefer to drink their local beer.

As stated, brand name has an influence over consumer choice surrounding beer in Greece. Avgeris et al. article establishes the five most frequently mentioned brands of beer in Greece to be, Amstel (18.9%), Fix (15.3%), Heineken (14.5%), Alfa (13.8%) and Vergina (9.4%). Four out of the five brands mentioned belong to two of the largest breweries in Greece with Amstel, Heineken and Alfa being produced by Athenian Brewery (Heineken group) and Fix by Olympic brewery (Carlsberg Group). The remaining brand Vergina belongs to Macedonian Thrace Brewery.

The factor to which the public concluded was the least influential aspect was advertisement. 70% of consumers mentioned that advertisement does not play a role when considering which beer to purchase.

== Economy ==
The growth of the brewery industry in Greece has provided work for the citizens as in 2014, 60,965 jobs were related to beer. Indirect employment of the same year was 4,507 jobs. Total consumer spending in 2014 was 1,689 million Euro. This is correlated to beer acting as a stimulus as within the same year beer added 494 million Euro to the Greek economy. The citizens are not the only impacted by the industry as the Government revenue in 2014 was 640 million euro. The way to which the Government generate revenue from beer is broken into five categories, which include:

- Excise duties - 107 million
- VAT (on-trade sector) - 253 million
- VAT (off-trade sector) - 62 million
- Income tax, payroll tax and social security contribution (brewing sector) - 35 million
- Income tax, payroll tax and social security contributions (other sectors) - 181 million

== Beer production ==
=== Breweries ===
The four major brewing companies based in Greece are the Athenian Brewery Αθηναϊκή Ζυθοποιία (in Greek), a subsidiary of Heineken, holding more than 53% of the market share, the Olympic Brewery, a subsidiary of the Carlsberg Group, holding almost 27% of the market share, the Hellenic Breweries of Atalanti holding around 8% of the market share and Macedonian Thrace Brewery holding around 6%.

Commercially brewed beers
Brewery	Location	Beers brewed	Established
Athenian Brewery	Athens	Amstel, Heineken, Alfa, Mamos, Amstel Premium Dark Bock, Alfa Weiss, Milokleftis, Alfa Strong, Vios 5, Amstel Premium Pilsener, Marathon, Zorbas, Amstel Free, Fürstenbräu, Alfa Non Alcoholic Lager, Nymphi, Amstel Kargo IPA, Amstel Radler Guarana-Lime	1963
Olympic Brewery	Athens	Fix Hellas, Fix Hellas Dark Premium, Fix Royale, Fix Anef	2005
Olympic Brewery	Sindos	Mythos, Henninger Kaiser Double Malt, Henninger Kaiser Blonde, Mythos Red, Mythos Radler, Golden Lager, Spartan, Aegean, Aris, Henninger Lager, Elomas, Zythia, Ey Zython, Mythos Ice, Mythology Lager, El Beer, Beeroni	1968
Hellenic Brewery of Atalanti	Kyparissi	EZA Premium Pilsener, EZA Fine Lager, EZA Alcohol Free, Odyssey Red Rhapsody, Odyssey White Rhapsody, SPAR Lager, Blue Island Fizzy Lemon, Blue Island Pink Grapefruit, New Yorker Fine Lager, Proton Beer, Wind, Berlin Lager, Ermis Gold, Ermis Argus, Pils Hellas, Captain Lager, Hellenic Star, Blue Island, Odyssey Dark Rhapsody - Calypso's Desire, Ducal de Atenas, Saronic, Blue Island Pear Delight, Beeri-Beeri, Imperial	1988
Macedonian Thrace Brewery	Komotini	Vergina Premium Lager, Vergina Weiss, Vergina Black, Vergina Red, Vergina Porfyra, Hillas, 365 Beer, Edelsteiner Premium Pils	1996

=== Microbreweries ===
The first Greek microbrewery was Craft beer in 1997. In 2020 there were approximately 65 active microbreweries in Greece, with approximately 6% of the country's market share. That is in comparison to 6 microbreweries that were active in 2009. This growth can be explained mainly by the increasing demand for specialized products and Greek brands in support of the local economy during the crisis. The major brewers of Greece acted upon this trend and launched brands under Greek names in order to limit the competition. Various microbrewery brand-name takeovers and buy-outs have been ongoing over the past years. According to Greek law, breweries are labeled as "microbreweries" when production is less than 200,000 hectolitres.

Beer Name	Producer/Owner	Region	Beer Types
56 Isles	Paros Microbrewery	Paros	Craft
Alea	Alea Brewing Company	Athens	Wit, Pale Ale, Stout, 3-way collab NEIPA
Ali	Thessaloniki Microbrewery Ltd	Thessaloniki	Craft
Amoussa	Arrib Danos	Patras	IPA, Stout
Argo, Molotov	Volos Brewery	Volos	Golden Ale, IPA
Athineo	Athenian Brewery	Athens	Seasonal
Brewtiful	Brewtiful Brewery	Chios	Double Dry Hopped New England IPA
Brinks	Rethymnian Brewery SA	Crete, Rethymno	Pale Ale
Canal Dive	Korintiaki Zithopiia SA	Corinth	Pilsner, Ale. Unfiltered, Unpasteurized
Chios Beer	Chios Beer Microbrewery	Vaviloi, Chios	Pale Ale, Porter Smoked, BBQ smoked, Weiss with mastic, IPA. Unfiltered, Unpasteurized
Corfu Beer	Kerkiraiki Zithopiia	Corfu	Pilsner, Lager, Weiss, IPA, Red Ale, Dark, Double fermentation
Delphi / Marea	Elixi Brewery	Athens	Pilsner, Dark, IPA, Blonde and more
Dias	Korfi SA	Kato Ag. Ioannis	Lager
Donkey	Santorini Brewing Company	Santorini	Lager, Weiss, IPA, Red Ale
Empati	Kythnos Beer	Kythnos	Wheat
Epilogi	Zotos Ltd	Gianitsa	Lager
Flaros	Flaros / Siris Microbrewery EE	Athens	IPA, Amber Ale, Seasonal, Wheat, Porter
Fonias	Samothraki Microbrewery	Samothraki	Pale Ale
Harma	Cretan Brewery	Crete, Chania	Pilsner, Lager, Weiss, Pale Ale, Stout, Cretan Ale, Dunkel, Mexican
Helmisons	Helmisons Brewery	Crete, Ierapetra	Pale Ale, IPA, Witbeer, Dark Ale
Hoppy Seal	Monachus Brewing	Alonisos	Pilsner
Ikariotissa	Ikariaki Zythopiia IKE	Ikaria	Ale, Red Ale
Johnnies' Beer	Macedonian Microbrewery	Drama	Lager
Karma	Kordosis-Thamnidis OE	Nemea	Lager, Pale Ale, Red Ale, Golden Ale
Kasta	Kasta Microbrews	Crete, Heraklion	Pale Ale, IPA, Amber Ale, Oatmeal
Katsika	Folegandros Microbrewey	Folegandros	Pilsner, Biere De Garde, Red Ale
Kirki	Kirki Brewery	Piraeus	Amber Lager, Pale Ale, IPA
Kefalonian Beer	Kefalonia & Ithaki Microbrewery	Kefalonia	Lager, Red Ale
Kykao	Kykao Nanobrewery	Patras	IPA, Stout, Seasonal, Rye, Pale Ales
Lafkas	Lafkas Brewery	Crete, Chania	Pale Ale, Stout
Levante	Mikro-Brewery of Zakynthos	Zakynthos	Pale Ale, Stout
Local	Microbrewery of Thessaly	Volos	Golden Ale, IPA
Lola	Pinios Brewery	Larisa	Pilsner, Belgian Ale, IPA
Lyra	Lyra Brauerei	Crete, Chania	Golden Ale
Magnus Magister / Knights	Magnus Magister Papadimitriou SA	Rhodes	Pilsner, Lager, Weiss
Mani Brewery	Mani Brewery	Mani	IPA, Blond, Ale, Porter
Marmita	Mikrozithopiia Kavalas OE	Kavala	Red Ale
Mikonu	Mykonos Brewing Company	Myconos	IPA, Pale Ale, Seasonal and more
Naxos Beer	Naxos Brewery	Naxos	Pilsner, IPA, Stout
Nissos	Cyclades Mircrobrewery	Tinos	Bohemian-Style Pilsner, European Lager, Dunkel
Noble Men	Noble Men Brewery	Halkida / Athens	Pilsner, IPA, Pale Ale, Abbey Triple
Noctua	Noctua Brewery Athens	Athens	Pale Ale, IPA, Black IPA, Amber Ale, Seasonal
Notos	Notos Brewery	Crete, Heraklion	Lager, Weiss, Pale Ale
Nymphi Beer	Athenian Brewery	Thessaloniki	Hoppy lager, 5% Alc
Olympica Magna	Elis Brewery	Elia	Lager
Olympos Beer	Hondrogianni Paraskevi	Katerini	Pale Lager
One Eyed Jack	Midnight Circus Gypsy Brewery	Athens	Pilsner, Red Ale, IPA, Stout
Ora	Patraiki Zithopiia IKE	Patras	Pilsner, IPA, Stout, Weiss
Plastiga	Zythopiia Georgios Papadiotis	Volos	Stout, Strong Ale, Urban Ale, Weiss
Samos Beer	Samos Beer	Samos	Ale
Septem	Septem Microbrewery	Evia	Stout, Red Ale, Pilsner, Pale Ale, Porter and more
Sigri	Sigri Brewery	Lesvos	Red Ale, Blond Ale
Sknipa	Standard Microbrewery of Thessaloniki	Thessaloniki	Pilsner, Stout, IPA, Seasonal, Strong
Solo	Solo Brewery	Crete, Heraklion	Pale Ale, Seasonal, IPA, Porter, Stout and more
Sparta	Lakoniki Brewery	Sparta	Lager
Spira	Spira Skopelos Brewers	Skopelos	Golden Ale, IPA, Dry Stout, Weiss
Stala	Epirus Brewery Ltd	Ioannina	Cream Ale, Pale Ale, Red Ale, IPA, Seasonal
Stilvi	Zithopiia Thessalias IKE	Karditsa	Lager, Stout, Weiss
Theros	Solar Microbrewery Xanthi	Xanthi	Summer Ale, Irish Red Ale, Dunkel
Tiki Luau	Seven Island Breweries	Corfu	Fruit Ale, Stoout
Theta (Θ)	Thessaliki Brewery	Athens	Pilsner, Lager, Premium, Weiss, Seasonal
Touls Brews	Touls Brews	Patras	Pale Ale
VAMbeer	Korfi SA	Kato Agios Ioannis, Pieria	Pislner, Lager. Unfiltered, unpasteurised
VAP	VAP P Kougios SA	Rhodes	Lager
Volkan Brewery	Volkan Brewery	Athens	Pilsner, Dunkel, Wheat
Voreia Beer	Siris Microbrewery EE	Serres	Pilsner, IPA, Stout, Low Alcohol and more
Wings	The Icarian Spirit Microbrewery	Ikaria	Lager, Pale Ale
Zeos	Ζeos Ζithopiia SA	Argos	Pilsner, Lager, Weiss
Voreia Beer	Siris Microbrewery EE	Serres	Pilsner, IPA, Stout, Low Alcohol and more
