= Lyktos =

City in ancient Crete

Coordinates: 35.207°N 25.367°E

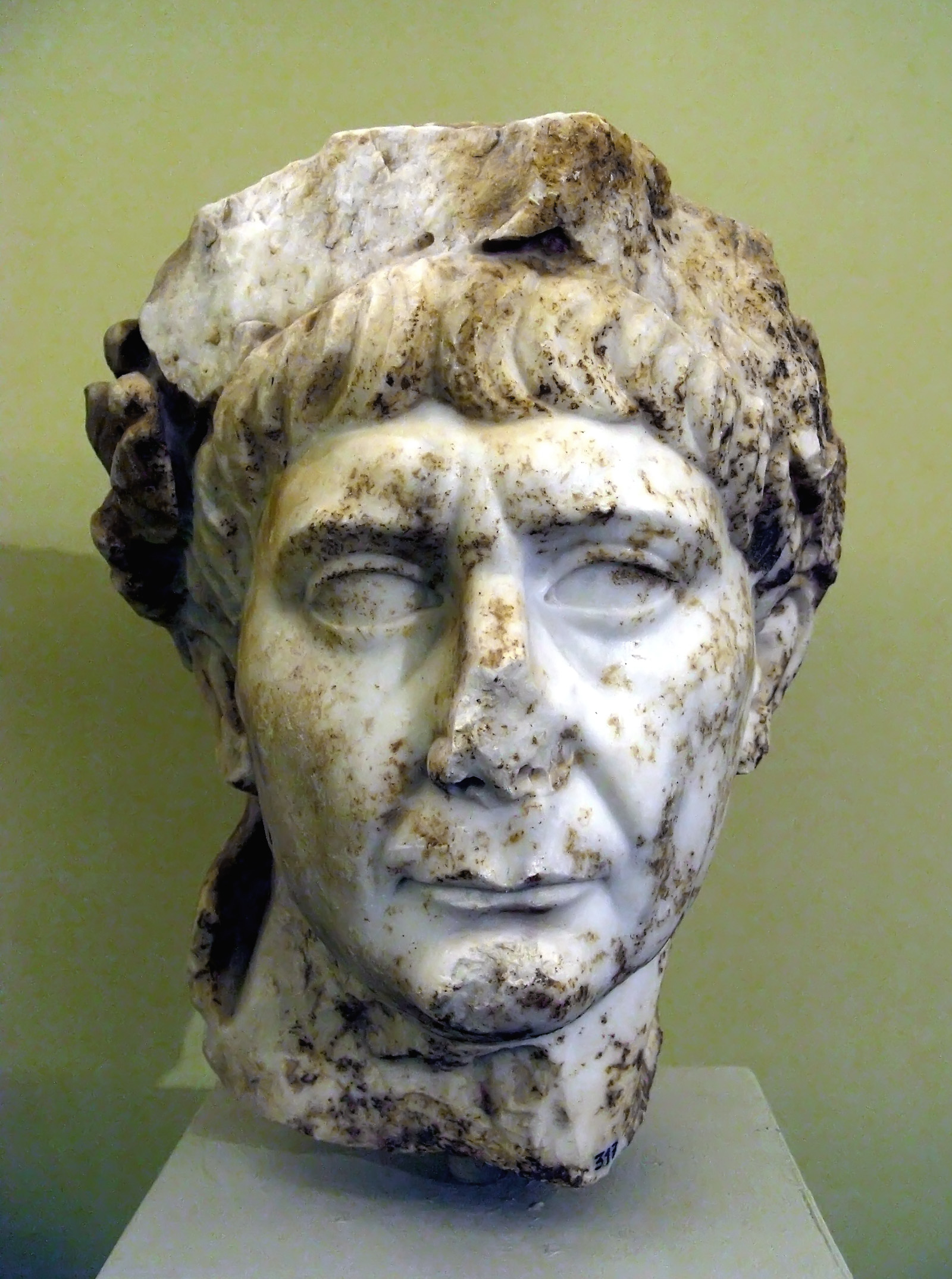
Marble portrait of the Roman Emperor Trajan (98–117 AD), found at Lyktos. Archeological Museum of Iraklio

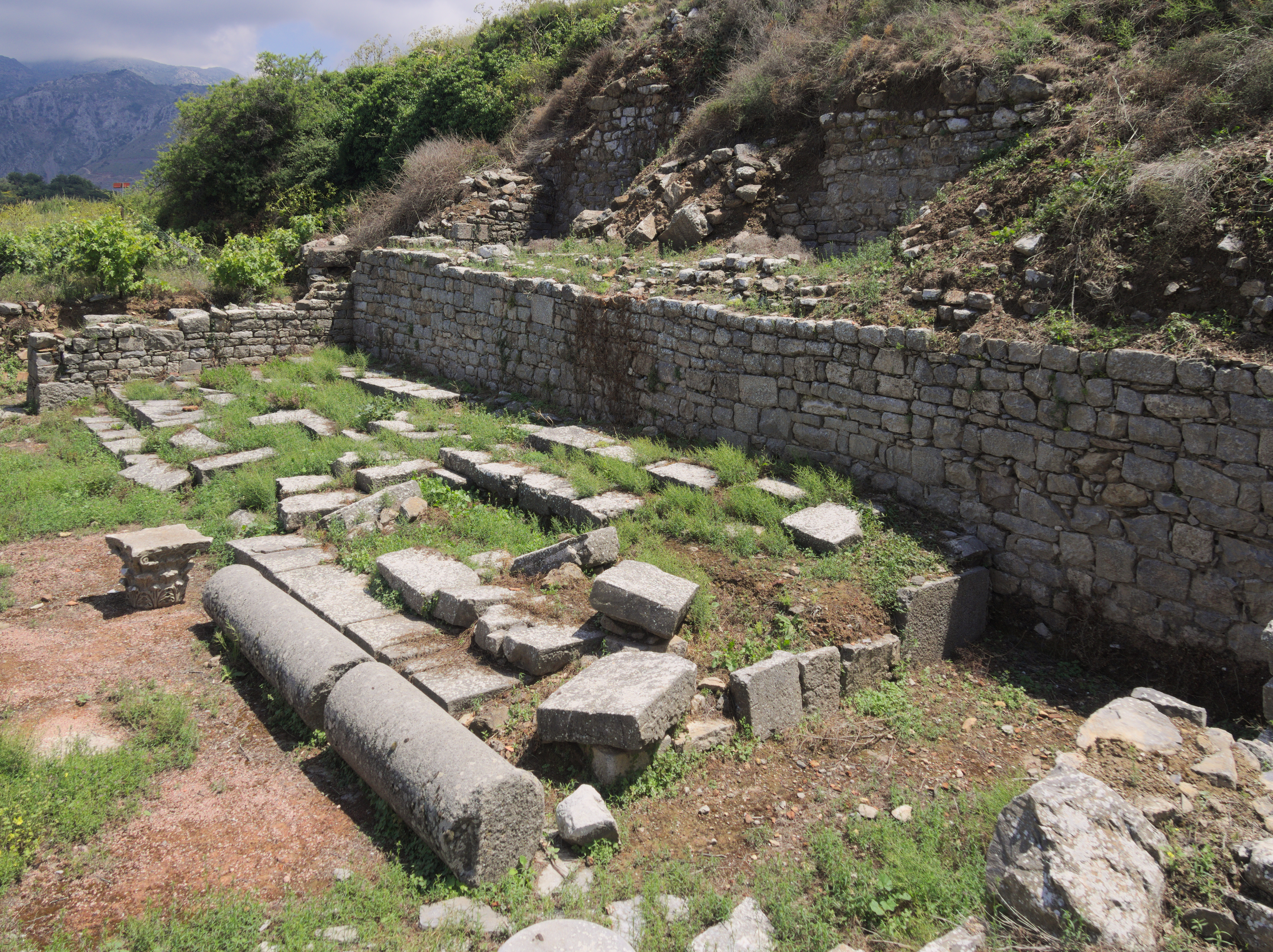
The Bouleuterion of Lyttos

Lyktos (Greek: Λύκτος or Λύττος) was a city in ancient Crete. During the Classical and Roman periods, it was one of the major settlements on the island. Its ruins are located near the modern-day village of Lyttos in the municipality of Minoa Pediada, Heraklion Regional Unit.

== Lyktos in mythology ==
Lyktos appears in the Homeric catalogue. According to Hesiod, Theogony (477-484), Rhea gave birth to Zeus in Lyktos and hid him in a cave of Mount Aegaeon. The inhabitants of this ancient Doric city called themselves colonists of Sparta, and the worship of Apollo appears to have prevailed there.

== History ==
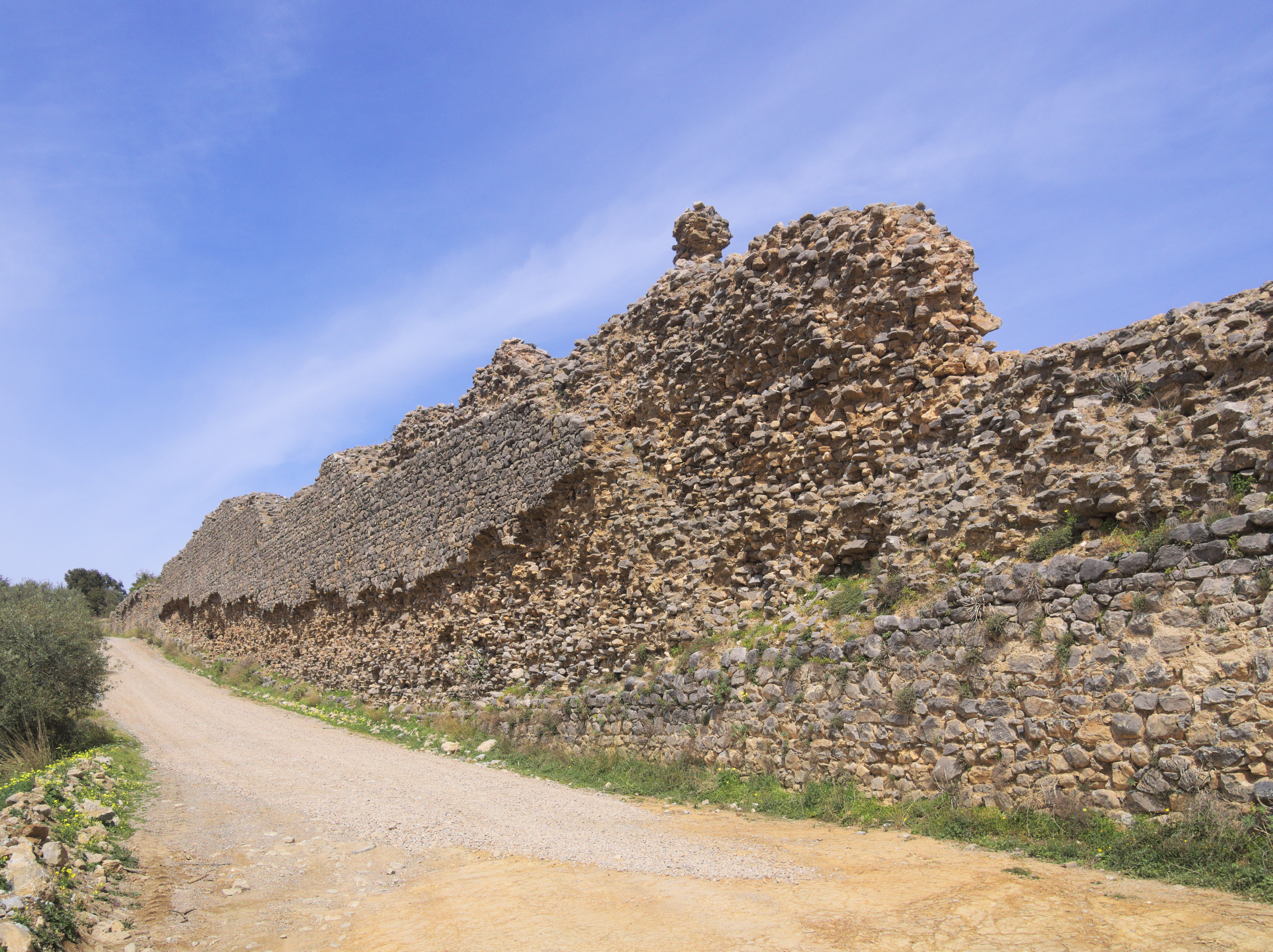
Aqueduct of Lyctus

The name "Lyktos" seems to originate in the Bronze Age, appearing in Linear B texts as ru-ki-to and as rkt (ry-kꜣ-tı͗) in an Egyptian list of Aegean place names from the Mortuary Temple of Amenhotep III.

In 344 BC, Phalaecus the Phocis assisted the Knossians against their neighbors the Lyktians, and took the city of Lyktos, from which he was driven out by Archidamus, king of Sparta. The Lyktians, at a still later period, were engaged in frequent hostilities with Knossos, and succeeded in creating a formidable party in the island against that city. During the Lyttian War in 220 BC the Knossians, taking advantage of their absence on a distant expedition, surprised Lyktos, and utterly destroyed it. The citizens, on their return, abandoned it, and found refuge at Lappa. Polybius, on this occasion, bears testimony to the high character of the Lyktians, as compared with their countrymen. They afterwards recovered their city by the aid of the Gortynians, who gave them a place called Diatonium, which they had taken from the Knossians.

Lyktos was sacked by the Roman general Metellus, but was existing in the time of Strabo at a distance of 80 stadia (15 km) from the Libyan Sea. The site still bears the name of Lytto, where ancient remains are now found.

In the 16th century, Venetian manuscripts describe the walls of the ancient city, with circular bastions, and other fortifications, as existing upon a lofty mountain, nearly in the centre of the island. Numerous vestiges of ancient structures, tombs, and broken marbles, are seen, as well as an immense arch of an aqueduct, by which the water was carried across a deep valley by means of a large marble channel.

The harbor of Chersonesos served as the port for Lyktos trade.

The town of Arsinoe belonged to Lyktos during the Hellenistic period, according to Stephanus of Byzantium, although its location is far from certain. Some scholars locate this Arsinoe (Crete) at the site of the older city of Rhithymna (although it is rather far from Lyktos). Others place it near the village of Malia, at Chersonesos above, or elsewhere in the territory of Lyktos.

The decoration of the coins issued at Lyktos is usually an eagle flying, with the inscription "ΛΥΤΤΙΩΝ" ("of the Lyttians").

== Modern history ==
Before unearthing Knossos, Arthur Evans intended to excavate Lyktos but did not succeed in obtaining the necessary permits. As of 2022, only a small part of the site has been systematically excavated. A new five-year research program commenced in 2021, the Lyktos Archaeological Project, whose first year yielded significant findings the most important of which was a headless marble statue of Hadrian.
