= Rethymno =

City on the island of Crete, Greece

Rethymno Ρέθυμνο
- Settlement
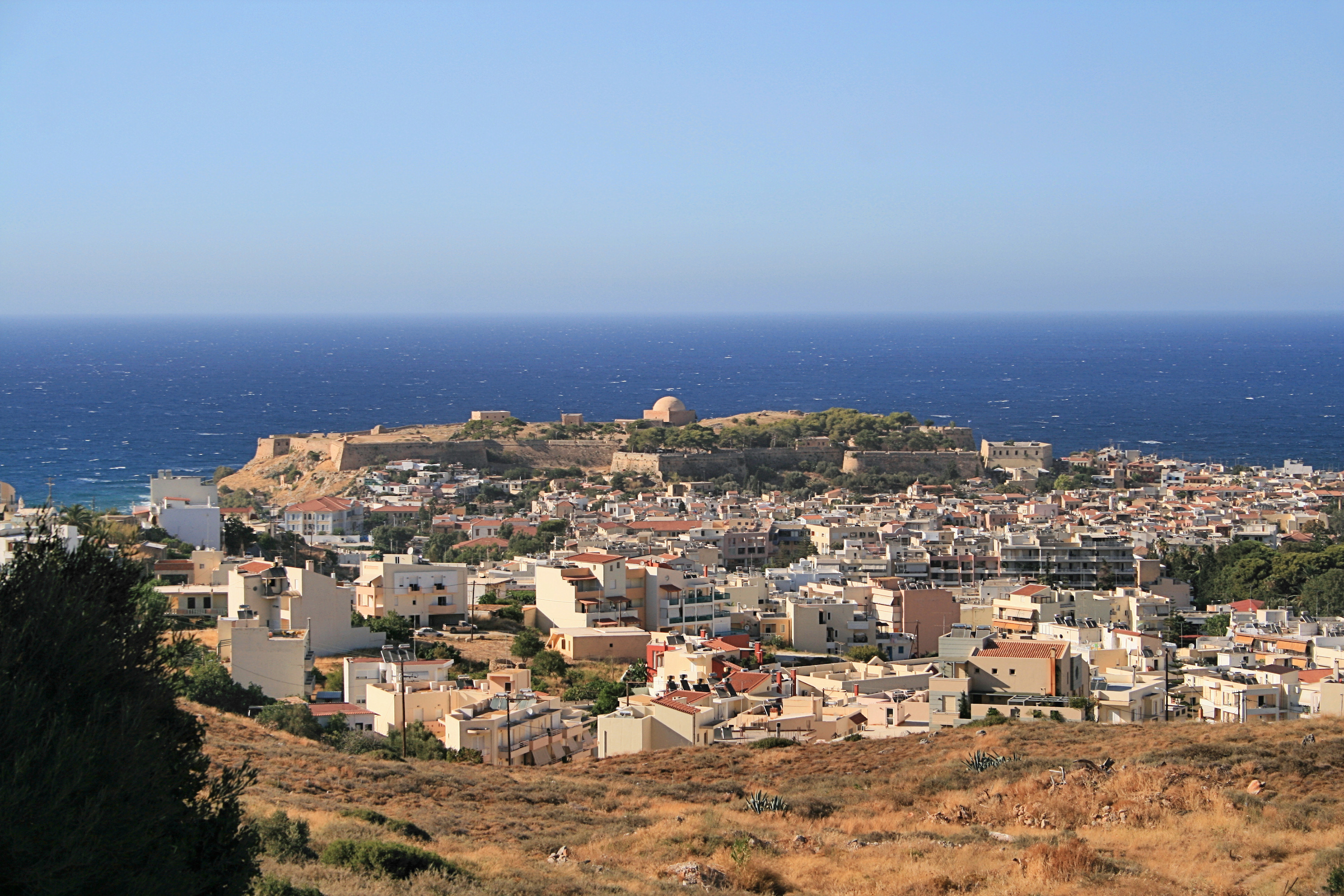
- View of Rethymno with the Venetian Fortezza fortress

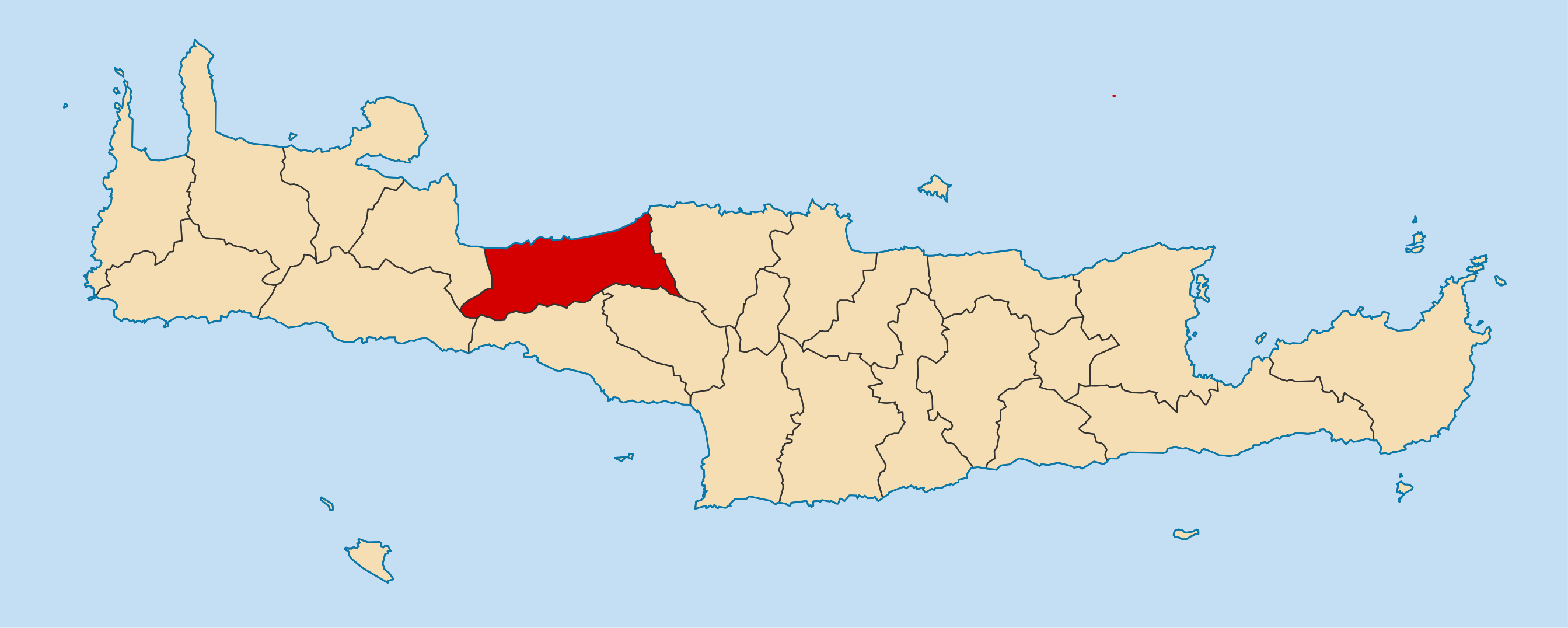

- Location within Greece
- Coordinates: 35°22′08″N 24°28′26″E
- Country: Greece
- Administrative region: Crete
- Regional unit: Rethymno
- Municipality: Rethymno

Area
  - Municipal unit: 126.5 km^{2} (48.8 sq mi)
  - Community: 26.777 km^{2} (10.339 sq mi)
- Elevation: 17 m (56 ft)

Population (2021)
  - Municipal unit: 38,759
  - Municipal unit density: 306.4/km^{2} (793.6/sq mi)
  - Community: 35,763
  - Community density: 1,335.6/km^{2} (3,459.2/sq mi)
- Time zone: UTC+2 (EET)
  - Summer (DST): UTC+3 (EEST)
- Postal code: 741 00
- Area code: 28310
- Vehicle registration: ΡΕ
- Website: www.rethymno.gr

Rethymno (Greek: Ρέθυμνο [ˈreθimno], Italian: Retimo, formerly also Rettimo or Retimno, Latin: Civitas Rethymnæ) is a city in Greece on the island of Crete. It is the capital of Rethymno regional unit, and has a population of more than 35,000 inhabitants (nearly 40,000 for the municipal unit). It is believed to have been built on the site of the earlier city of Rhithymna.

== History ==
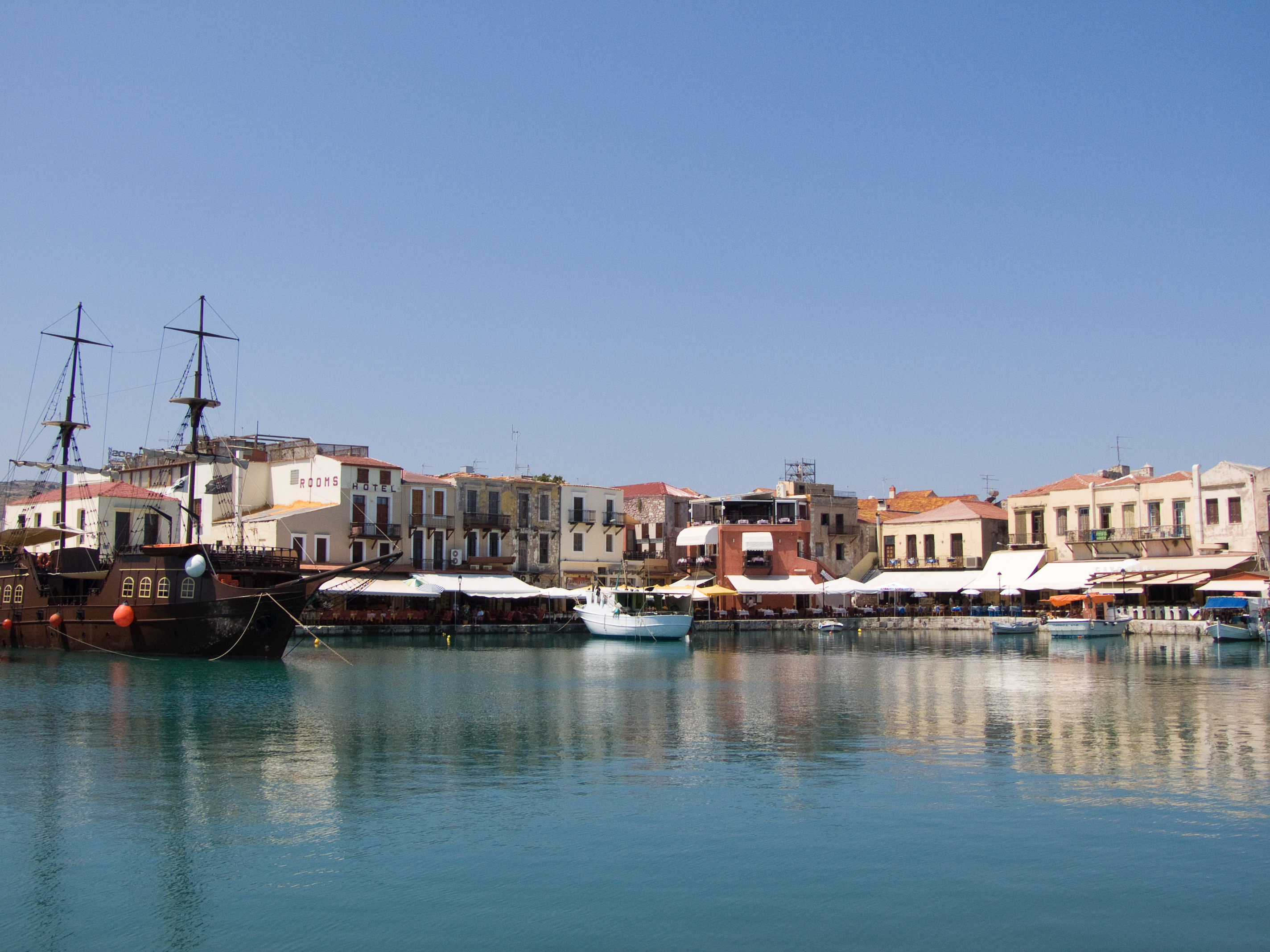
View of the old harbour

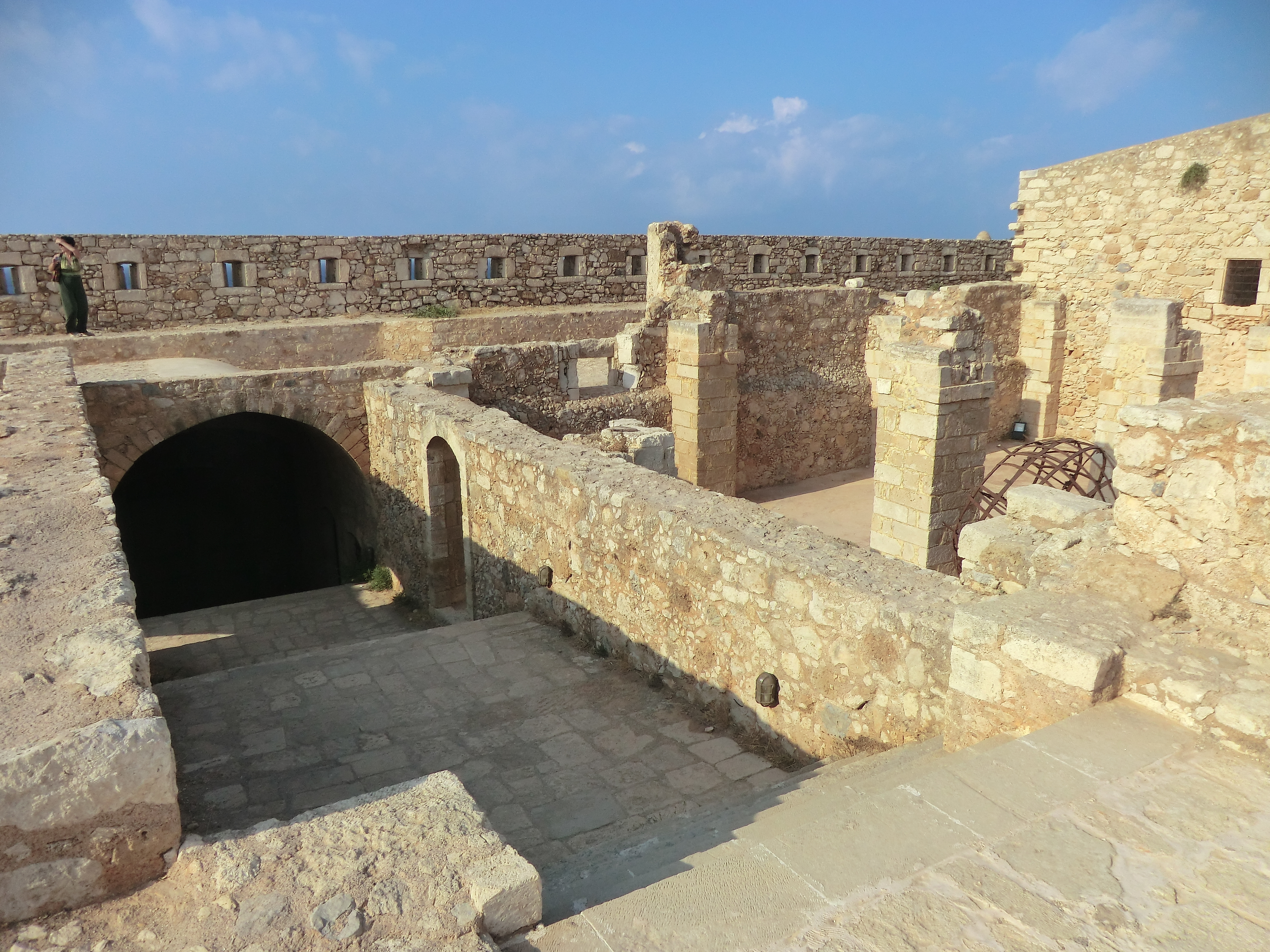
Inside the Fortezza of Rethymno

Rethymno is believed to have been built on the site of the earlier city of Rhithymna. Some sources mention a city called Arsinoe which some scholars have proposed stood at the same site.

Rethymno began a period of growth when the Venetian conquerors of the island decided to establish an intermediate commercial station between Heraklion and Chania, acquiring its own bishop and nobility in the process. Today's old town (palia poli) was almost entirely built by the Republic of Venice. It is one of the best-preserved old towns in Crete.

From circa 1250 the city was the seat of the Latin Diocese of Retimo, which was renamed Retimo–Ario after the absorption in 1551 of the Diocese of Ario.

The town still maintains its old aristocratic appearance, with its buildings dating from the 16th century, arched doorways, stone staircases, Byzantine remains, the small Venetian harbour and narrow streets. The Venetian Loggia houses the information office of the Ministry of Culture and Sports. A Wine Festival is held there annually at the beginning of July. Another festival, in memory of the destruction of the Arkadi Monastery, is held on 7–8 November.

The city's Venetian-era citadel, the Fortezza of Rethymno, is one of the best-preserved castles in Crete. Other monuments include the Neradje Mosque (the Municipal Odeon arts centre), the Great Gate (Μεγάλη Πόρτα or "Porta Guora"), the Piazza Rimondi and the Loggia.

The town was conquered by the Ottoman Empire in 1646 during the Cretan War (1645–69). The town, called Resmo in Turkish, was the centre of a sanjak (administrative part of a province) during Ottoman rule.

During the Cretan Revolt of 1866–1869, the nearby Arkadi Monastery became a major centre of resistance against Ottoman rule. In November 1866, a large Ottoman force besieged the monastery, where 259 defenders and more than 700 women and children had taken refuge.

After several days of fighting, Ottoman troops entered the monastery. Rather than surrender, the defenders ignited barrels of gunpowder stored inside, causing an explosion that killed most of those sheltering there, as well as many of the attackers. Thirty-six insurgents who had taken refuge in the monastery’s refectory were subsequently massacred. The event became known as the Holocaust of Arkadi and attracted considerable sympathy for the Cretan cause across Europe.

During the Battle of Crete (20–30 May 1941), the Battle of Rethymno was fought between German paratroopers and combined forces of the Second Australian Imperial Force and the Hellenic Army. Although initially unsuccessful, eventually the Germans won the battle after receiving reinforcements airlifted to Maleme in the northwestern part of the island.

Today the city's main source of income is tourism, with many new facilities having been built in the past 20 years. Agriculture is also notable, especially olive oil and other Mediterranean products.

== Municipality ==
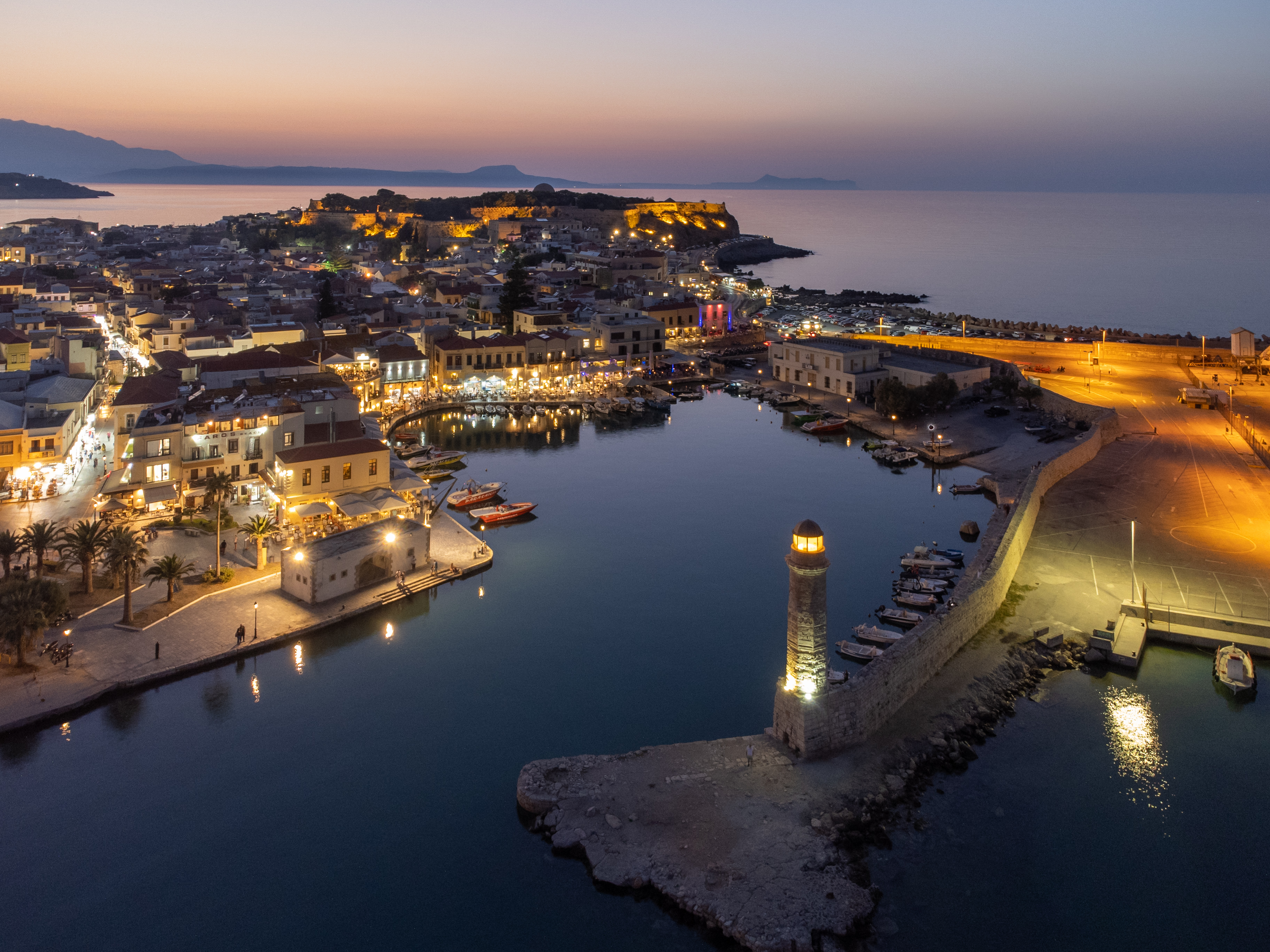
Dusk airview of the Old Harbour of Rethymno

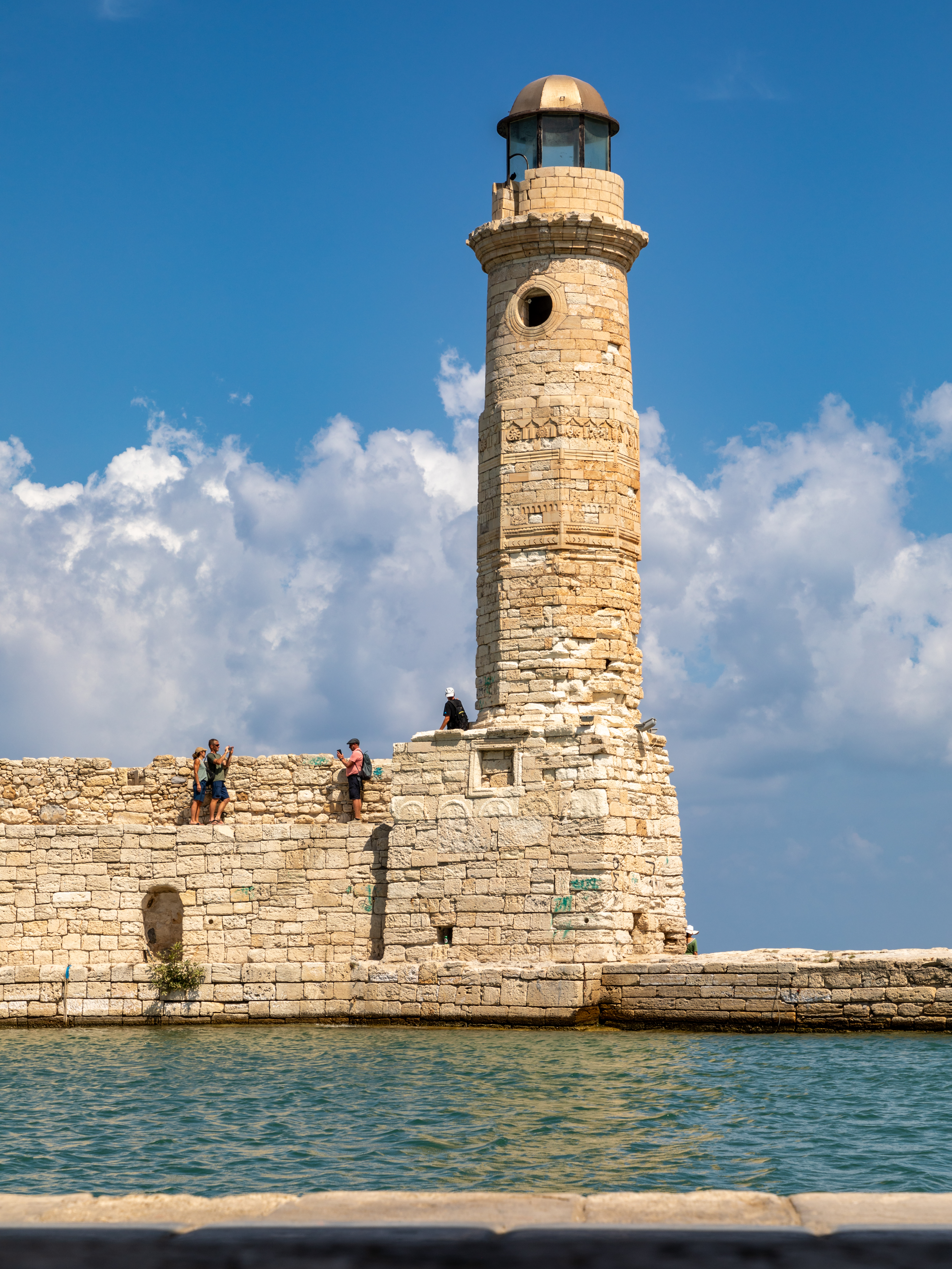
Rethymno Lighthouse

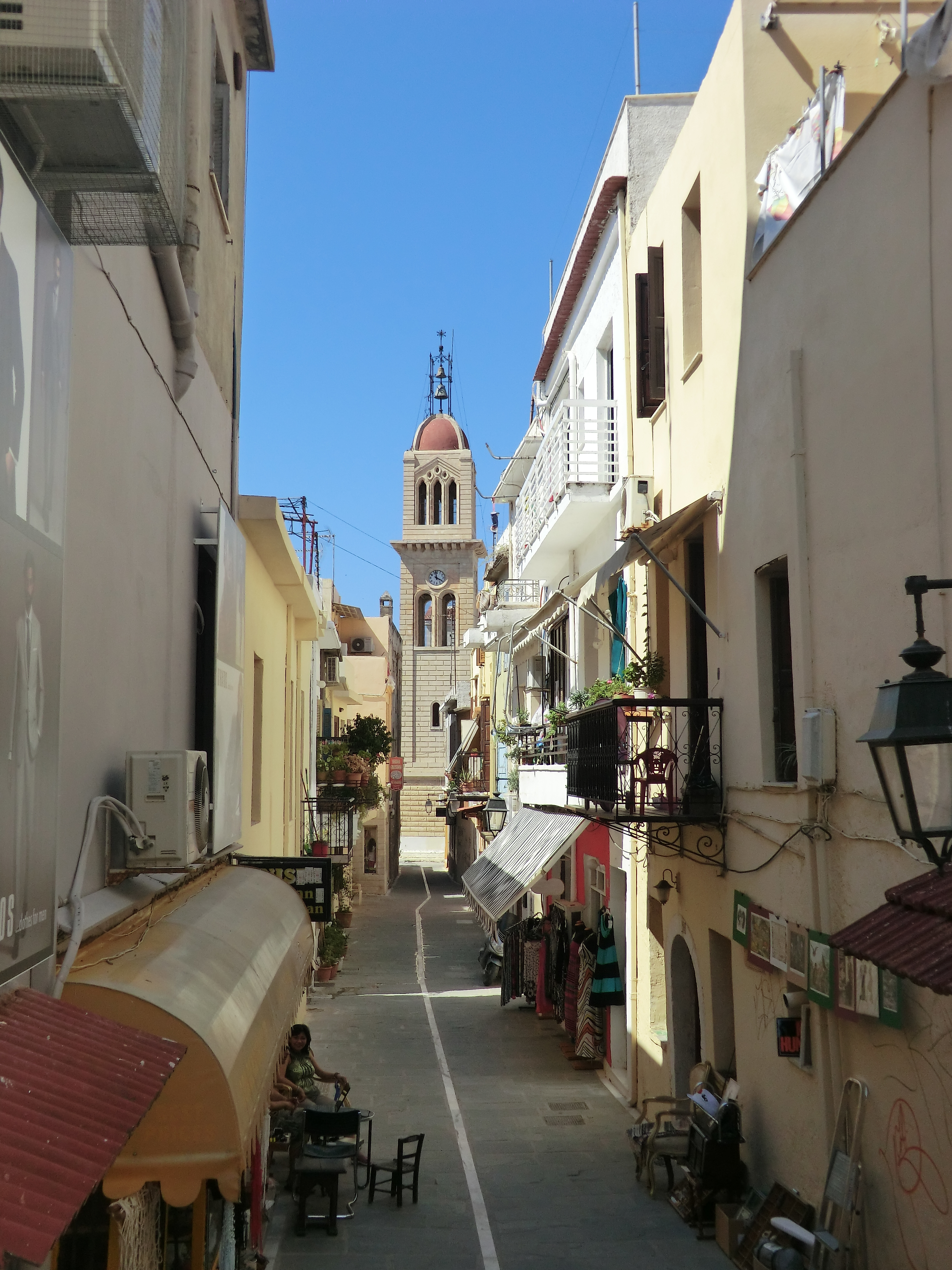
Street and the belltower of Megalos Antonios church in the fond

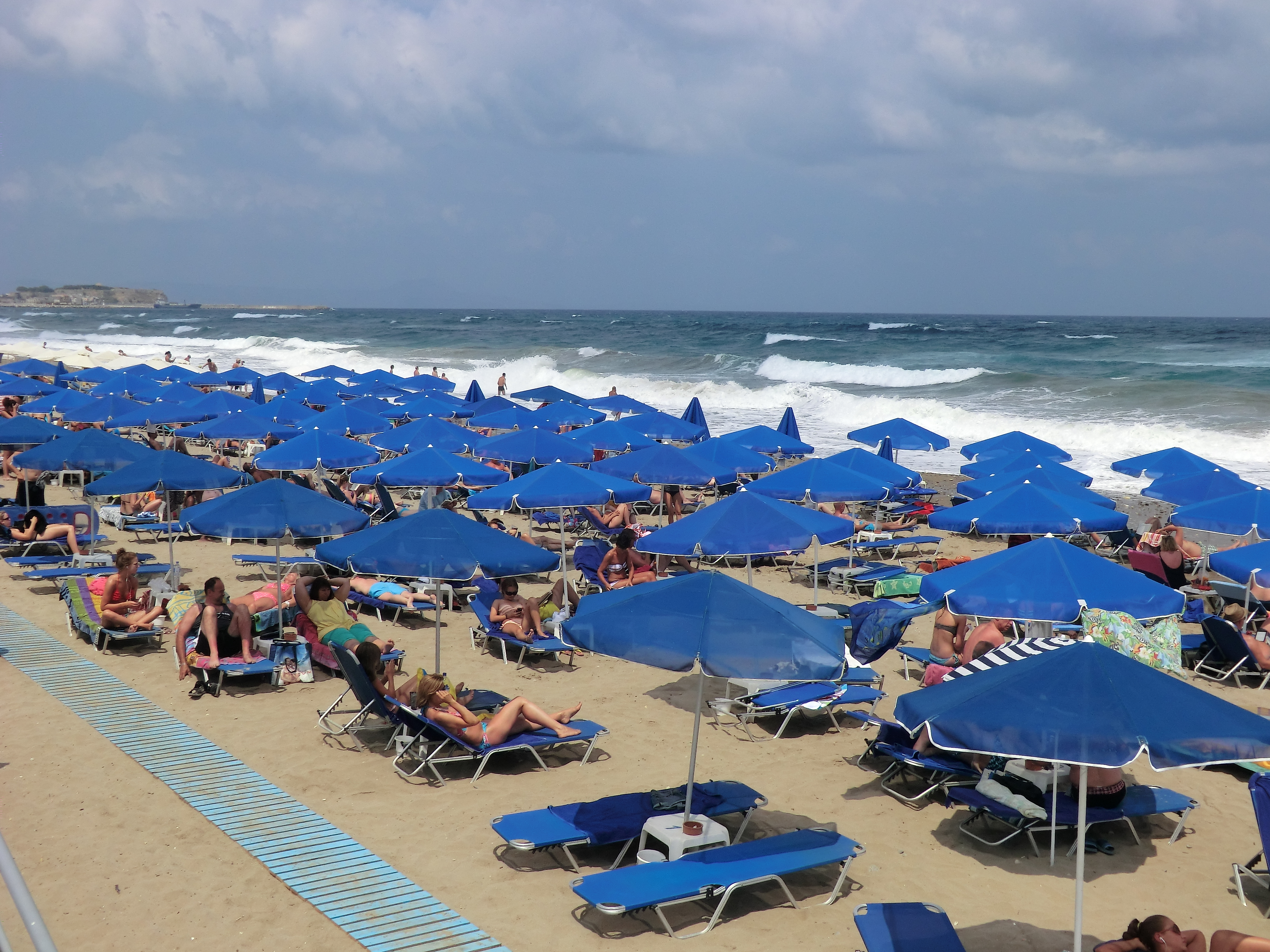
Beach of Rethymno

The municipality of Rethymno was formed at the 2011 local government reform by the merger of the following 4 former municipalities, that became municipal units:

- Arkadi
- Lappa
- Nikiforos Fokas
- Rethymno

Population of Rethymno

Settlements	1940	1951	1961	1971	1981	1991	2001	2011
Rethymno (city)	8,648	11,057	14,999	14,969	17,136	23,355	28,987	32,468
Agia Eirini	96	88	63	47	34	63	49	75
Agios Markos	-	-	-	-	18	65	-	-
Anogeia	50	25	25	21	13	15	89	131
Gallos	315	274	252	180	146	205	430	922
Giannoudi	92	82	78	30	22	23	96	116
Kastellakia	-	45	27	36	105	-	-	-
Koumpes	-	106	-	-	-	-	-	-
Metochi Albani	67	79	31	-	-	-	-	-
Megalo Metochi (Risvan)	-	33	25	-	6	28	29	46
Mikro Metochi	-	-	-	-	29	91	188	149
Misiria	294	212	-	-	-	-	-	-
Xiro Chorio	214	219	132	90	-	114	131	221
Perivolia	853	805	-	-	-	-	-	-
Platanes	343	488	-	-	-	-	-	-
Tria Monastiria	-	-	-	-	18	105	107	172
Total	10,972	13,513	15,632	15,373	18,190	24,064	31,687	34,300

== Culture ==
Rethymno is home to the following museums:

- Archaeological Museum of Rethymno
- Historical and Folklore Museum of Rethymno
- Municipal Gallery "L. Kanakakis"
- The Frantzeskaki Collection
- Museum of Sea Life at Rethymno

The Treasure Hunt of Rethymno is a game played by local people and takes place two weeks before Carnival.

=== Literature ===
Pandelis Prevelakis wrote Το χρονικό μιας πολιτείας (1937), The Chronicle of a Town, a nostalgic depiction of Rethymno from the period of the Cretan State (1898) to the expulsion of the Cretan Turks (1924).

=== Sports ===
Rethymno hosted the international athletics meeting known as Vardinogianneia. The athletics meeting stopped in 2012 due to Greek financial crisis. Rethymno has many sport clubs with presence in Panhellenic championships of various sports. Below is a list of the main sport clubs of Rethymno.

Sport clubs based in Rethymno
Club	Founded	Sports	Achievements
Asteras Rethymno F.C.	1945	Football	Earlier presence in Gamma Ethniki
Rethymniakos F.C.	1961	Football	Earlier presence in Beta Ethniki
NO Rethymnou	1963	Water Polo	Presence in A1 Ethniki women
EA Rethymniakou	1983	Football, Track and Field	Earlier presence in Beta Ethniki
Rethymno B.C.	1986	Basketball	Presence in A1 Ethniki
OPE Rethymnou	1992	Volleyball	Presence in A1 Ethniki women

Furthermore, Rethymno has a fencing academy, called Akadimia Xifaskias Rethymnou. The team opened in 2021, and since then, its fencers have competed in many National Championships and cups, showing their talent.

== Education ==
In the Rethymno Campus of the University of Crete are located the School of Philosophy, the School of Education, the School of Social, Economics and Political Sciences, and the University Library of the University of Crete. On a yearly basis, there are about 8.000 students studying at "Galos" where the Campus and the Academic Institute of Mediterranean Studies are located. Also in Rethymnon is located the School of Music and Optoacoustic Technologies of the Hellenic Mediterranean University. Finally, in Rethymno, Tria Monastiria area is located the international research Institute of Plasma Physics and Laser of the Hellenic Mediterranean University which is the access point of the National Research Facility HELLAS-CH .

== Geography ==
=== Climate ===
Climate data for Rethymno, Greece
Month	Jan	Feb	Mar	Apr	May	Jun	Jul	Aug	Sep	Oct	Nov	Dec	Year
Mean daily maximum °F (°C)	55 (13)	55 (13)	59 (15)	64 (18)	73 (23)	82 (28)	86 (30)	86 (30)	81 (27)	72 (22)	64 (18)	57 (14)	70 (21)
Mean daily minimum °F (°C)	45 (7)	45 (7)	46 (8)	52 (11)	57 (14)	64 (18)	70 (21)	70 (21)	64 (18)	59 (15)	54 (12)	48 (9)	56 (13)
Source: "Rethymnon, Greece - Average Annual Weather - Holiday Weather". Rethymnon: Annual Weather Averages. Holiday Weather. 2016.

== Notable locals ==
=== Royalty and politics ===
- Georgios Chortatzis (1545–1610), dramatist in Cretan verse
- Ahmed Resmî Efendi (1700–1783), Ottoman statesman, author and ambassador
- Nikolaos Sifounakis (born 1949), Greek politician
- Emetullah Rabia Gülnuş Sultan (1642–1715), valide sultan
- Emmanouil Tsouderos (1882–1956), former Prime Minister of Greece

=== Other ===
- Stylianos Harkianakis (1935–2019), Greek Orthodox Archbishop of Australia
- Athanasius III of Constantinople (1597–1654), Patriarch
- Pandelis Prevelakis (1909–1986), writer
- Manolis Xexakis (born 1949), poet and writer
- Nick Dandolos (1883–1966), professional poker player

== International relations ==
Rethymno is twinned with:

- Ayia Napa, Cyprus
- Castenaso, Italy
- Pushkin, Russia

== Gallery ==
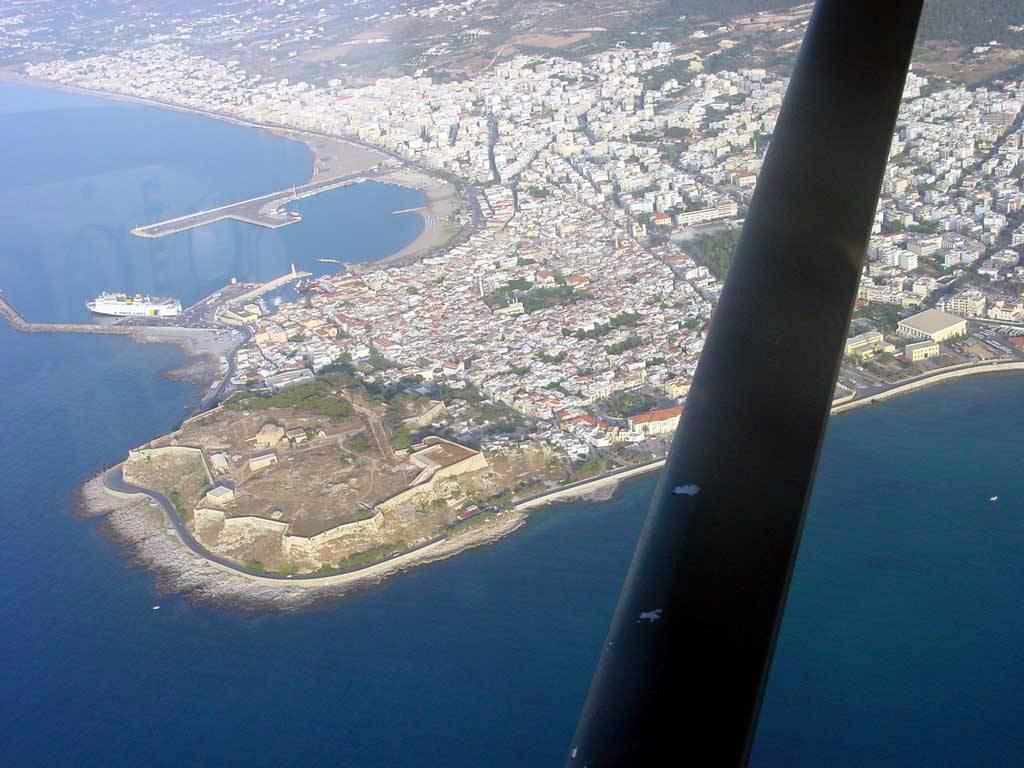
Panorama of the city

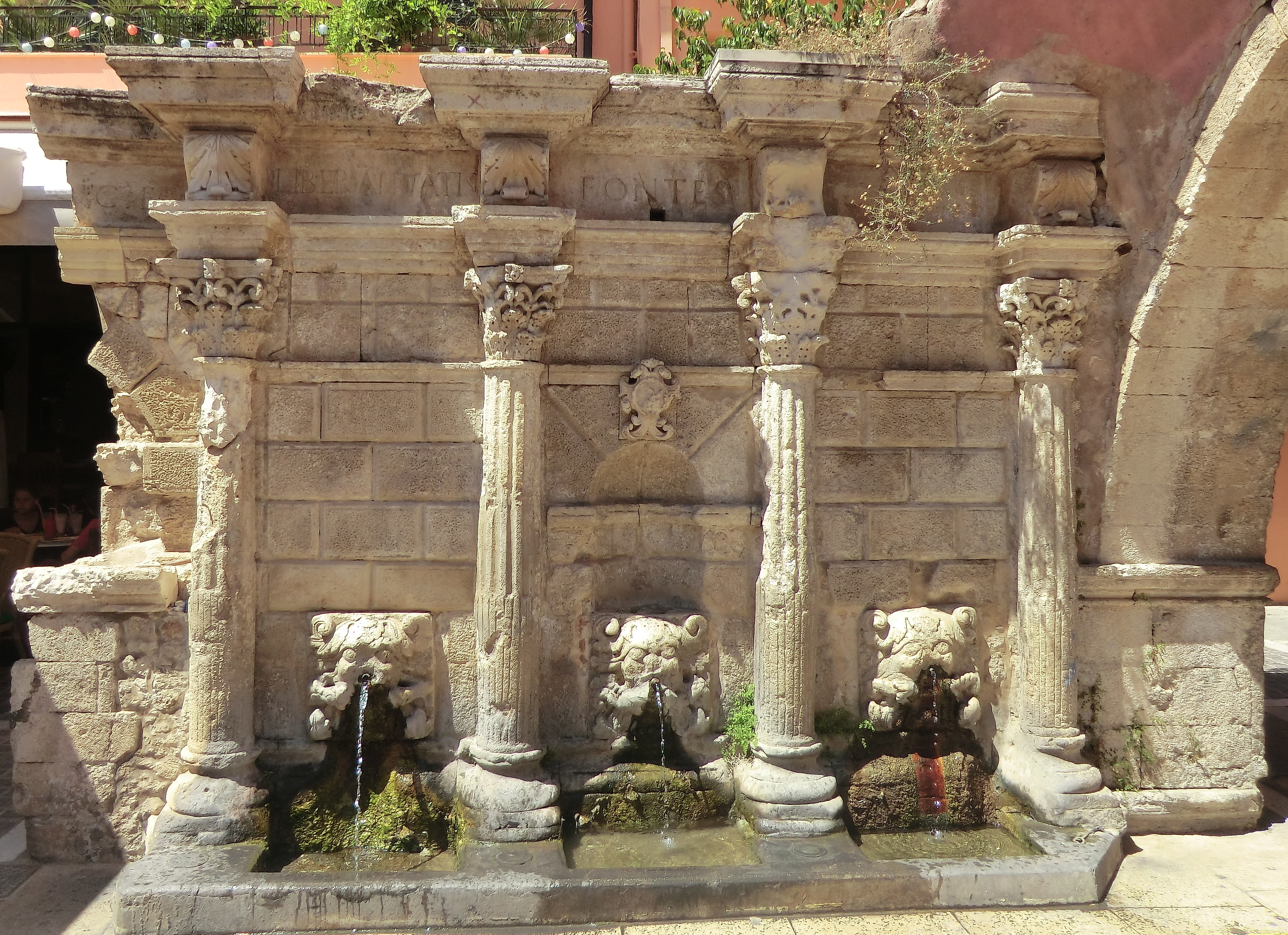
Rimondi Fountain

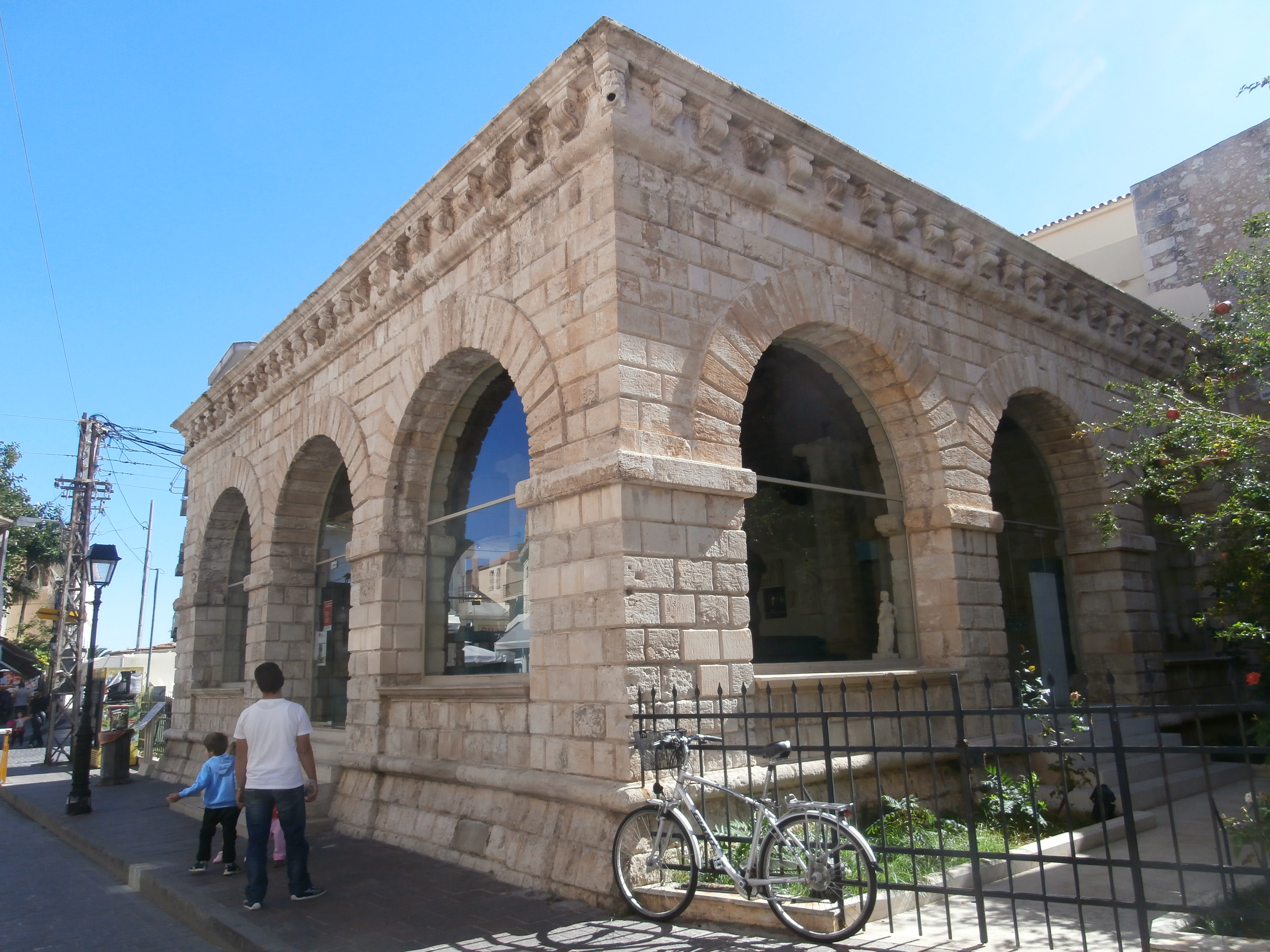
Venetian loggia

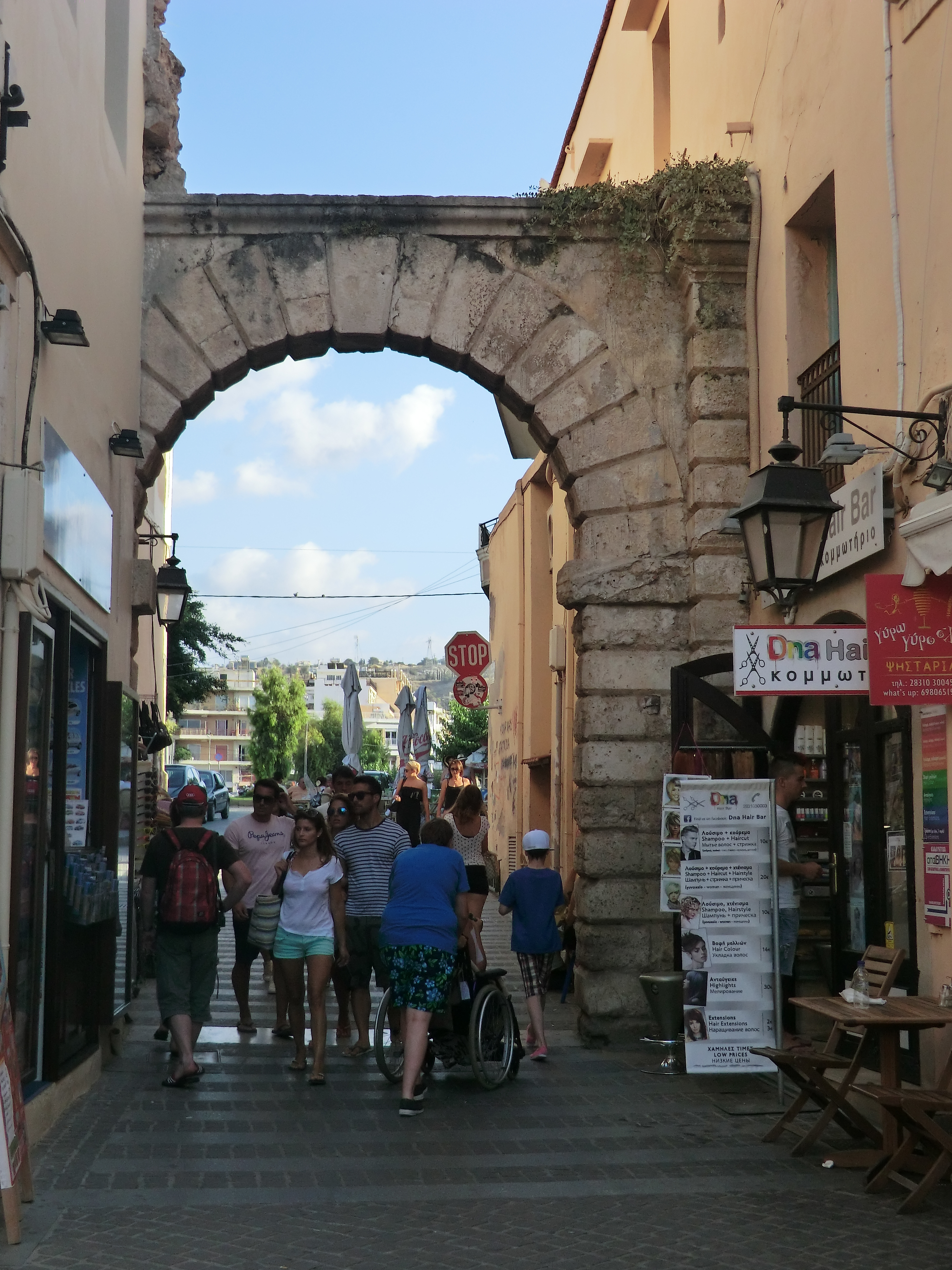
Guora Gate (Megali Pyli), old city gate

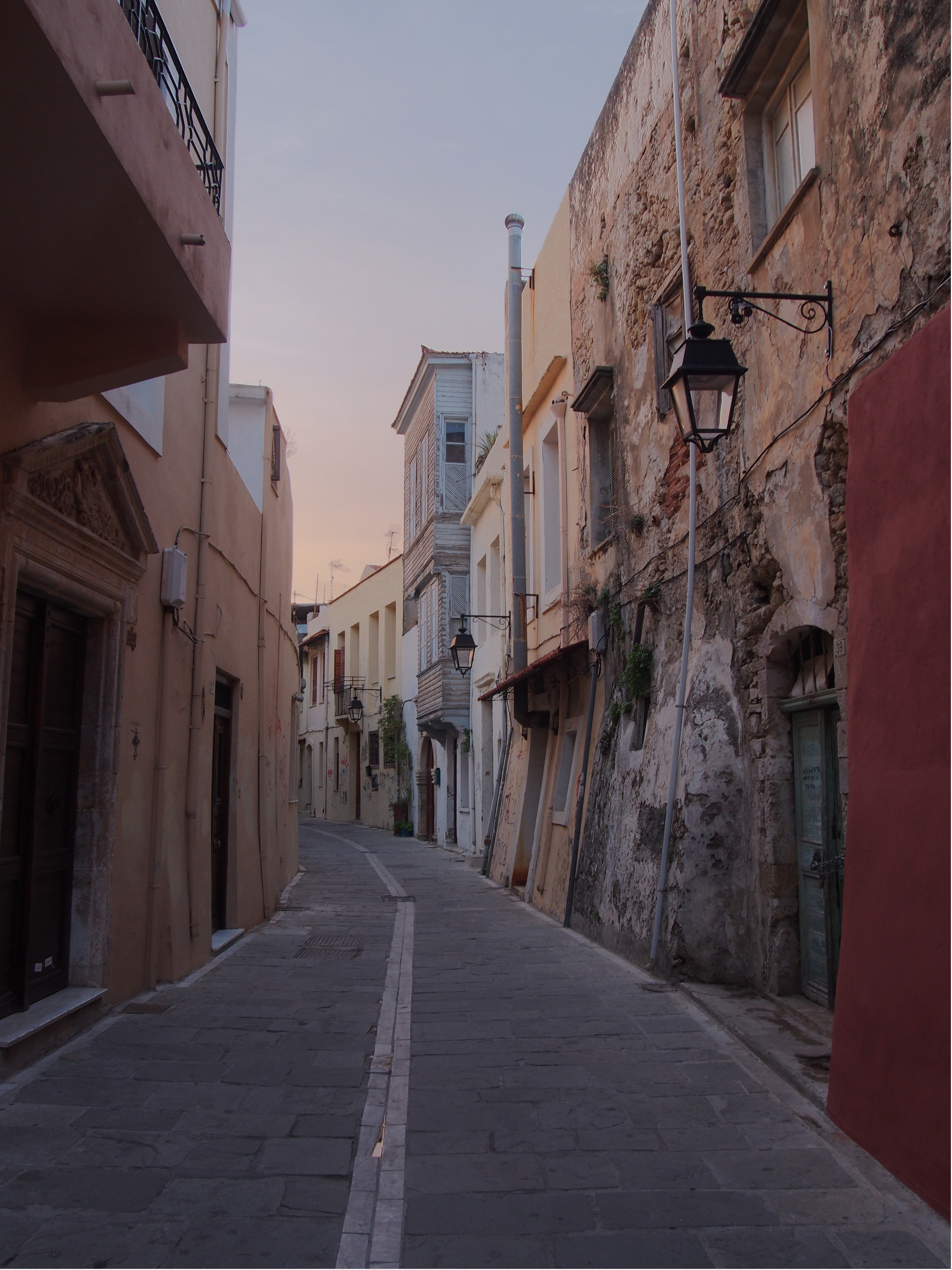
View of the old town

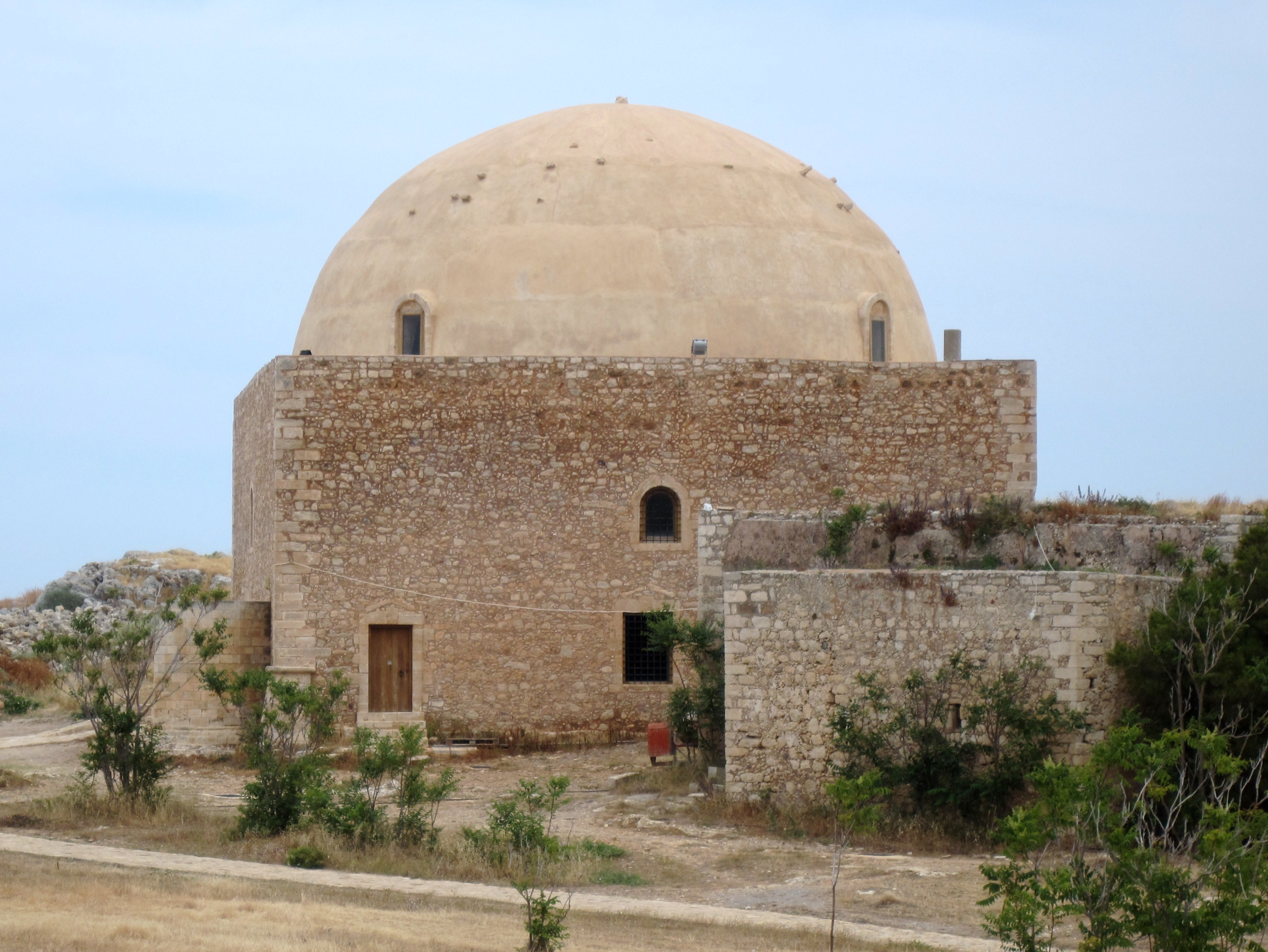
Sultan Ibrahim mosque

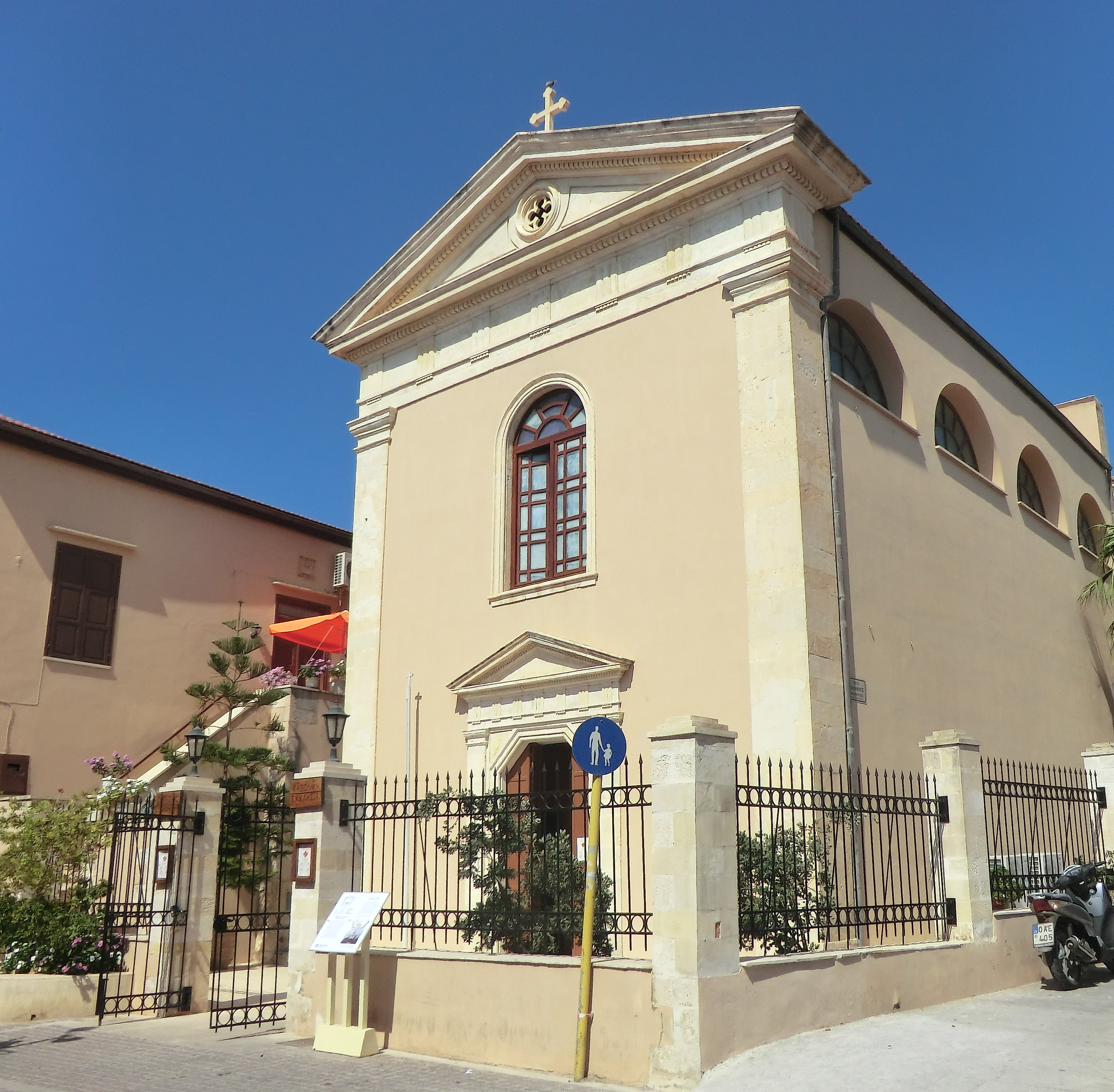
The catholic church of Agios Antonios

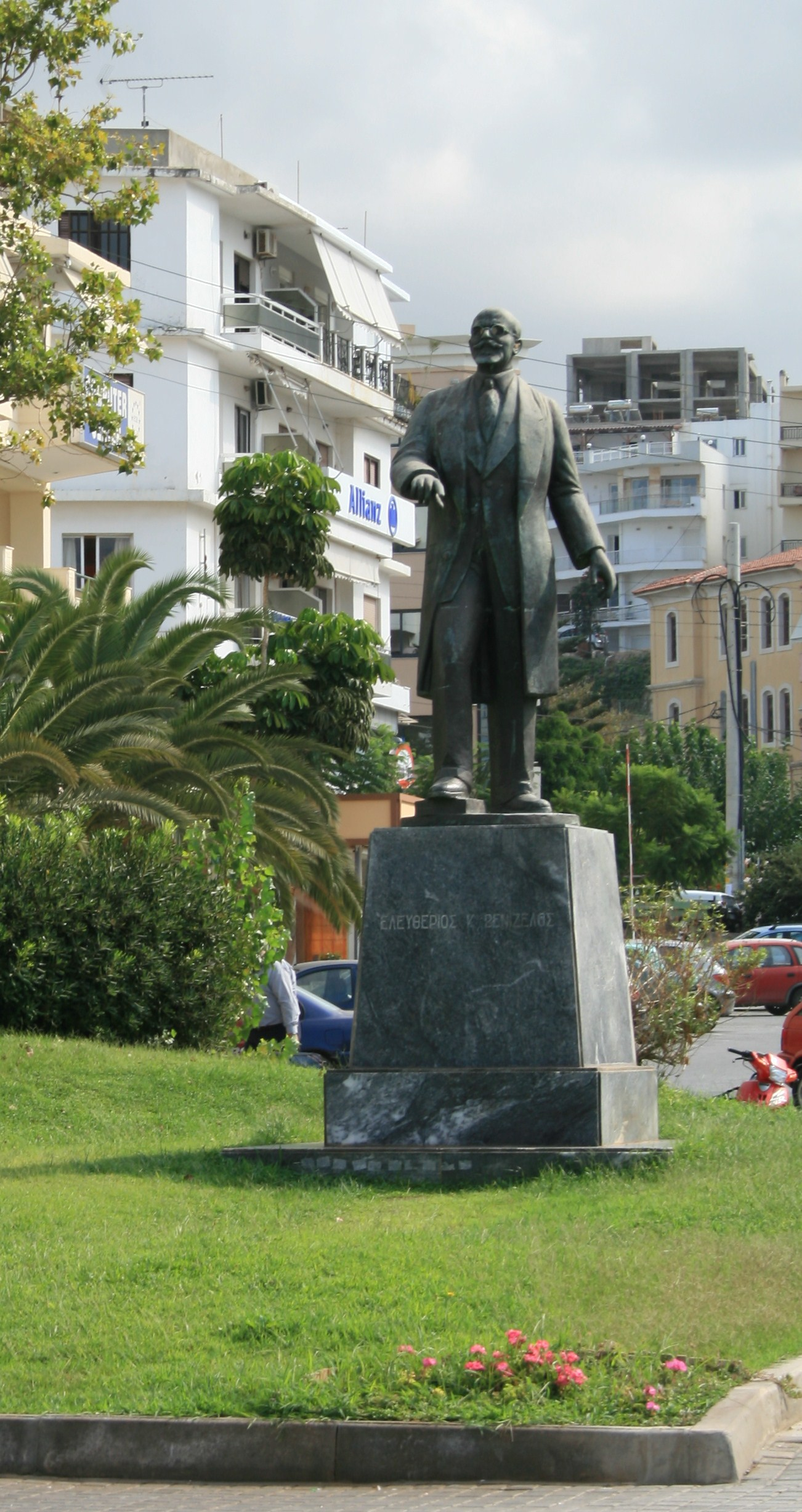
Eleftherios Venizelos statue

== See also ==
- History of Crete
- List of settlements in the Rethymno regional unit
- Rethymnian Brewery
