= Treasure Hunt of Rethymno =

The treasure hunt in Rethymno is a game played by local people in Crete and takes place two weeks before Carnival. Rethymno currently holds the Guinness World Record for Treasure Hunt.

== All day long game ==
During this long game, which lasts for one day, the whole town of Rethymno is involved. An outsider may wonder what everyone is doing running all day long within and outside (usually nearby) the town of Rethymno, on foot, by bike or by car. They search for the “treasure” and solve many quiz games to find it. It is an experience to watch a group in action or even participate in a group, although it is necessary to understand Greek to do so.

== Similar games ==
The Association of Hotel owners in co-operation with the Municipality of Rethymno organises a similar treasure hunt game each summer, as part of the celebration of the "International Day of Tourism". Visitors of Rethymno are at that point invited to participate and the winners are awarded 'all included' holidays in Rethymno.
