= Macedonian Thrace Brewery =

Greek brewery

- Headquarters: Komotini, Greece
- Products: Vergina Premium Lager; Vergina Red; Vergina Weiss; Vergina Porfyra; Vergina Black; Vergina Alcohol Free; Thracian Malt
- Revenue: €23,963,370 (2018)
- Operating income: €8,221,597 (2018)
- Net income: €2,770,255 (2018)
- Total assets: €23,793,770 (2018)
- Total equity: €15,554,000 (2018)
- Number of employees: 113 (2018)
- Subsidiaries: Tuvunu S.A.

Macedonian Thrace Brewery (Greek: Ζυθοποιία Μακεδονίας Θράκης) is a Greek brewery, founded in 1996, based in Komotini. Vergina Beer is its signature product. It also has branches in Athens and Thessaloniki.

== History ==
Macedonian Thrace Brewery S.A. was founded in 1996 by Demetri Politopoulos, a Greek-American chemical engineer. The Industrial area of Komotini was selected as the seat of the company facilities. The main goal of the newly founded company was the production of the "first Greek beer" under the trade name "Vergina" (Greek pronunciation: [verʝˈina]). The construction of the facilities was completed in 1997. The first products were released on February 18, 1998. Some of the difficulties occurred caused by the unfair competition tactics for which Athenian Brewery, a Heineken subsidiary company, later was found guilty by the court, but had already affected the growth of the company. Nowadays, the market share of the company ranges between around 5 and 7 percent.

The company introduced first the concept of contract farming to Greece in 2006 and as of 2019 the contracted acreage exceeded the 35,000 acres in Macedonia and Thrace.

In 2013 Vergina Weiss won the Silver Medal and the second place for MTB in the "Speciality Wheat Beer" category at the International Brewing Awards competition, the oldest one since 1886. In 2014 and 2018 again Vergina Weiss won the Bronze and Silver Medal accordingly, in the "South German-Style Hefeweizen Hell" category at the European Beer Star competition. In 2020 the company launched a new beer product, Vergina Alcohol Free, a low-alcohol beer (almost zero), and proceeded to a general rebranding with the formation of a new logo, graphics and products packaging.

== Products ==
The Brewery mainly produces Vergina Premium Lager, Vergina Red, Vergina Weiss, Vergina Porfyra Vergina XXX Black and Vergina Alcohol Free, but is also the producer for Edelsteiner, Hillas and Prost beer trademarks.

Vergina beer products are exported since 1999 in US, England, Italy, Australia, Japan, Netherlands, Turkey, Bulgaria, Cyprus and more.

Former packaging and branding

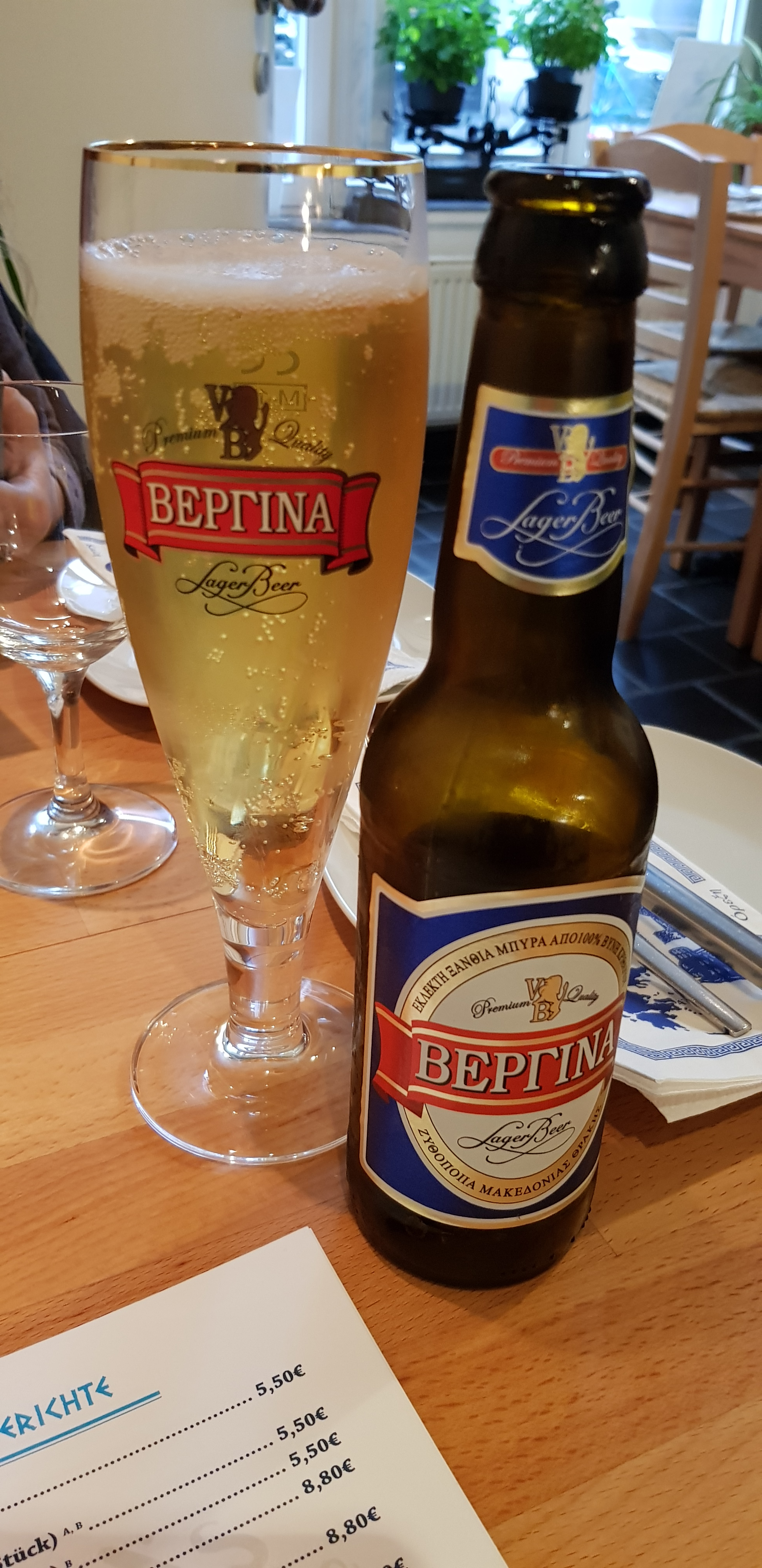
Former Vergina Beer glass and bottle packaging until July 2020

Former Vergina Beer logo until July 2020

== See also ==
- Beer in Greece
- Eastern Macedonia-Thrace
- Vergina
