= Neradje Mosque =

Former Ottoman mosque in Rethymno, Crete

- Τζαμί Νερατζέ
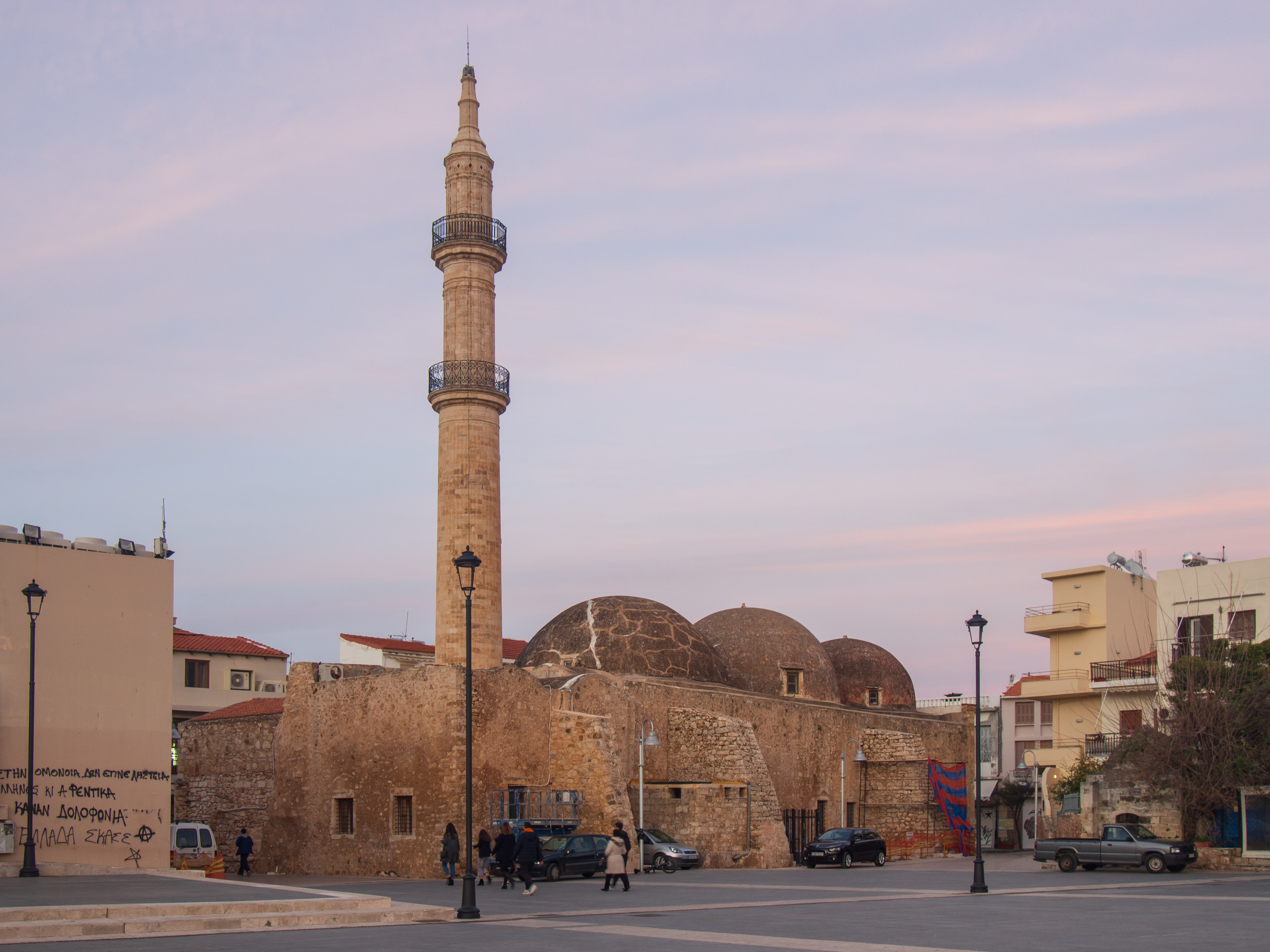

- Location of the former mosque in Crete

Religion
- Affiliation: Islam (former)
- Ecclesiastical or organizational status: Mosque (19th century–1924)
- Status: Abandoned (as a mosque); Repurposed (as a music school)

Location
- Location: Rethymno, Crete
- Country: Greece
- Interactive map of Neradje Mosque
- Coordinates: 35°22′9″N 24°28′28″E

Architecture
- Architects: Sebastiano Serlio (attrib.); Georgios Daskalakis (minaret)
- Type: Mosque
- Style: Ottoman
- Founder: Gazi Hüseyin Pasha
- Completed: c. 19th century; 1890 (minaret)

Specifications
- Dome: 3
- Minaret: 1
- Materials: Brick; stone

The Neradje Mosque or Neradjes (Greek: Τζαμί Νερατζέ, lit. 'bitter orange mosque', from Turkish: Narenciye Camii), formerly known as the Gazi Hüseyin Pasha Mosque (Gazi Hüseyin Paşa Camii), is a former mosque located in the old town of Rethymno, on the island of Crete, Greece. Completed during the Ottoman era, the former mosque was abandoned in 1924, and the structure was repurposed as a music school.

== History ==
The building in the past was a Catholic monastery of the Augustinian Order named Santa Maria. After the conquest of Rethymno by the Ottomans, the monastery was turned into a mosque, named in honour of Gazi Hüseyin Pasha. Following the 1923 population exchange between Greece and Turkey and the departure of the Muslim population of Crete a year later in 1924, the building was turned into a music school.

The minaret was built in 1890, during the last years of Ottoman rule in Crete, by the engineer Georgios Daskalakis.

== Architecture ==
The building has a rectangular shape and three semicircular domes. The single minaret has two balconies and it the tallest structure in the town. The building has Renaissance elements, such as a circular skylight and Renaissance-style windows and door. The doorway of the former church consists of two semi-columns on each side with Corinthian-style columns and a separate pedestal for each, which support the trigos. Above the door and below the threshold there is an arch, and a large fork in the middle of the bow. Semi-elliptical niches have been opened between the two columns on each side. The composition is believed to be based on the work of Sebastiano Serlio.

== See also ==
- Islam in Greece
- List of former mosques in Greece
- Ottoman Crete
