= Rhithymna =

Coordinates: 35°22′16″N 24°28′22″E

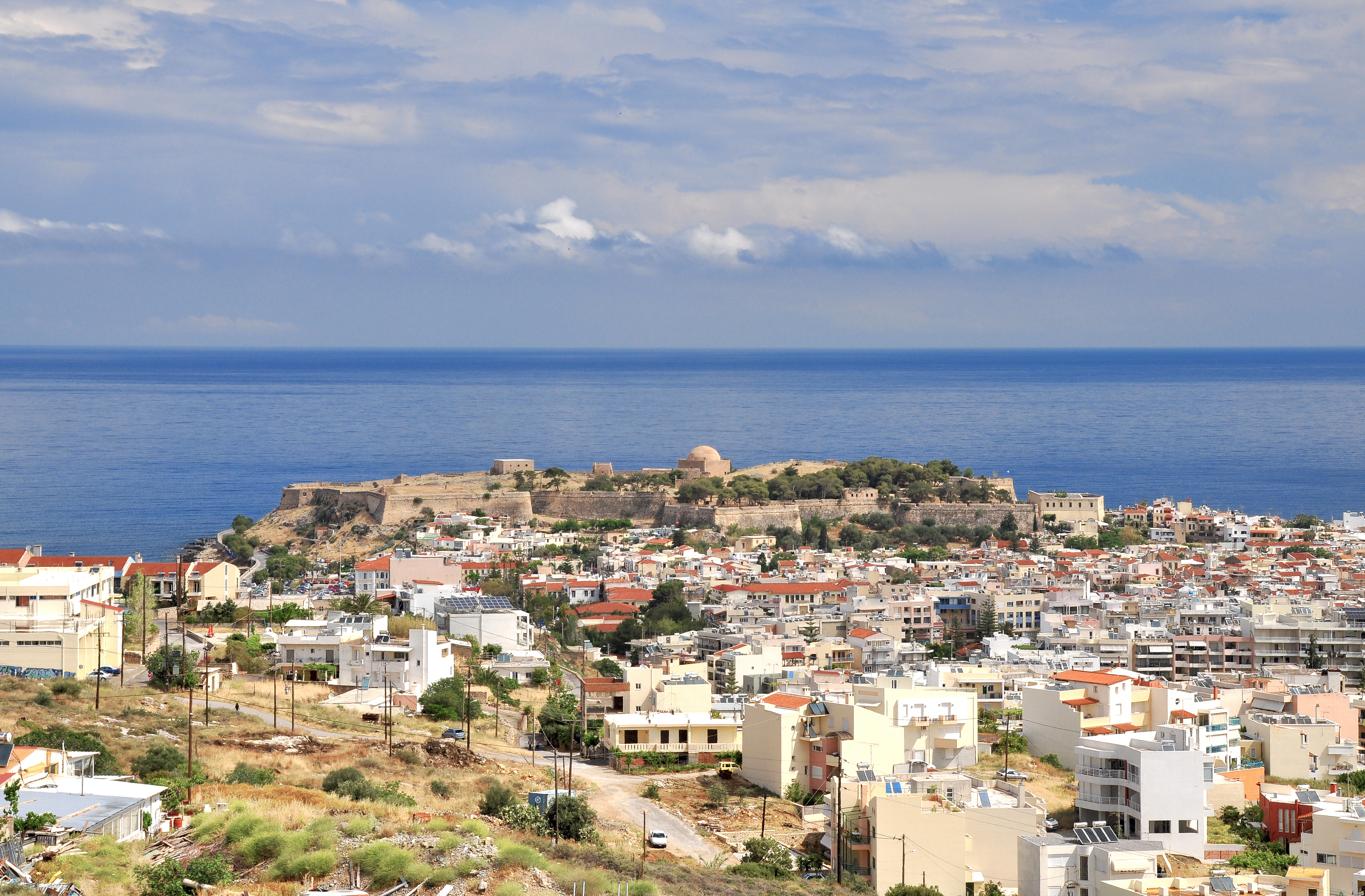

Rhithymna or Rithymna (Ancient Greek: Ῥίθυμνα) or Rhithymnia (Ῥιθυμνία), was a town of ancient Crete, Greece, which is mentioned by Ptolemy and Pliny the Elder as the first town on the north coast to the east of Amphimalla, and is spoken of as a Cretan city by Stephanus of Byzantium, in whose text its name is written Rhithymnia; Stephanus gives the city's ethnonyms as Ῥιθυμνιάτης and Ῥιθύμνιος. It is also alluded to by Lycophron (76). Modern Rethymno retains the name of the ancient city, upon whose site it stands. Rhithymna minted coins in antiquity; maritime emblems are found on them. It is believed that Arsinoe is the same town as Rhithymna.

== See also ==
- List of ancient Greek cities
