= Arsinoe (Crete) =

Ancient city of Crete

Coordinates: 35°22′16″N 24°28′22″E

Arsinoe (Greek: Ἀρσινόη) was a Hellenistic era city in Crete known primarily from the coins it minted. Though its location is not entirely certain, numismatic evidence suggests that it was a Ptolemaic refounding of the city of Rhithymna. This evidence includes stylistic parallels between coins minted by each city as well as the find spots for the Arsinoe coins clustering around Rhithymna. If this identification is accurate, the city would have reverted to its original name at an unknown later point.

The city is sometimes further equated with another Cretan city called Arsinoe mentioned in the writings of Stephanus of Byzantium. However, Stephanus appears to refer to this city as a dependent of Lyktos which has been taken as evidence of a location further east. Scholars have doubted both the intended reading of this passage as well as Stephanus's reliability as a source.
