= Santorini Brewing Company =

Greek brewery

- Type: Microbrewery
- Location: Greece Santorini
- Opened: 2011
- Website: santorinibrewingcompany.gr

The Santorini Brewing Company is a brewery on the Greek island of Santorini. Opening in 2011, the company is the first and only brewery on the island.

== Description ==
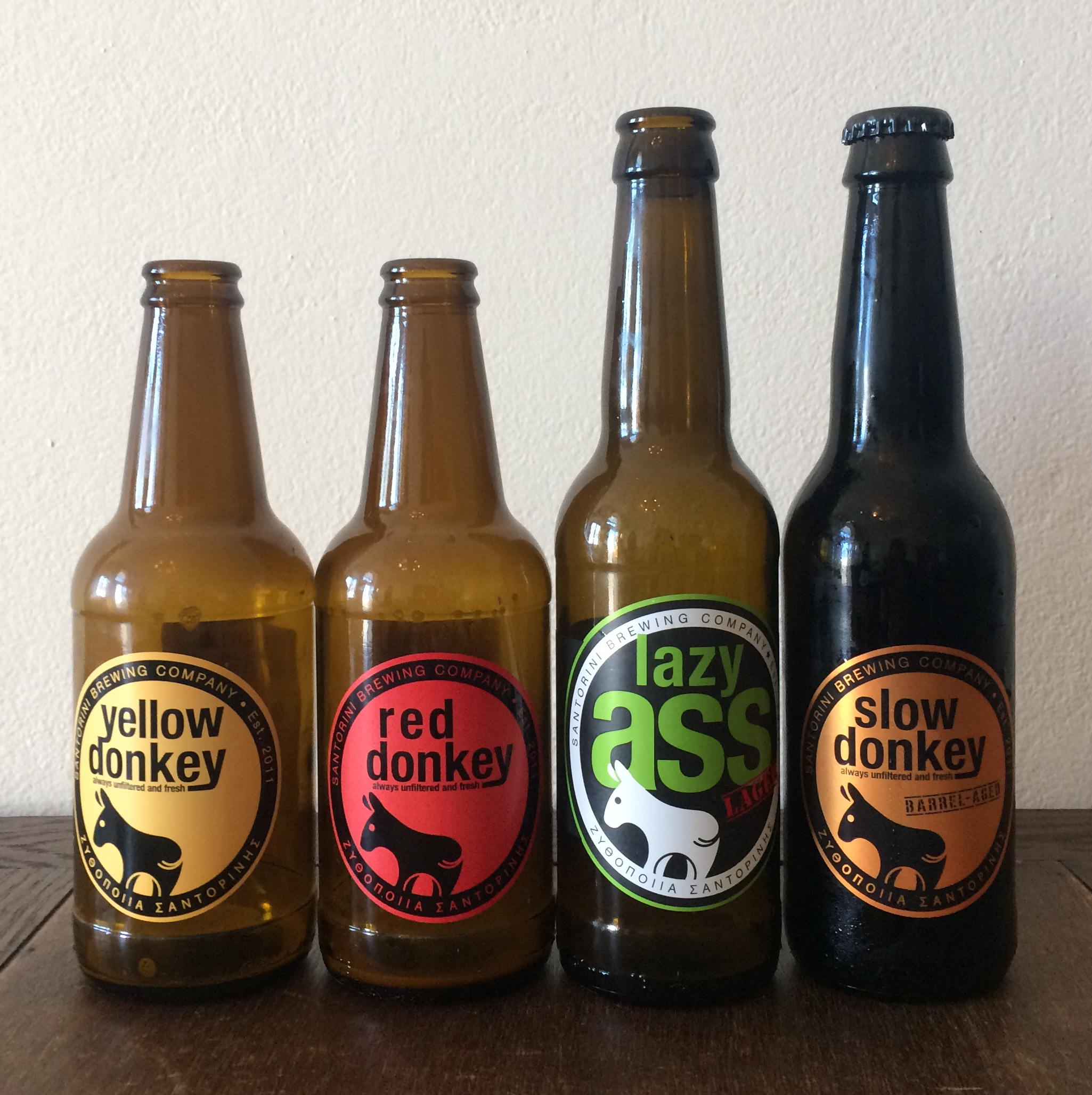
A selection of beers brewed by the Santorini Brewing Company

The Santorini Brewing Company was founded by a group of four brewers in 2011. The brewery uses locally grown wheat, hops, and barley, but imports malt from Bosnia. The company was the first brewery to open on Santorini, and was the only such establishment as of August 2018. The brewery is located in the Mesa Gonia region of Santorini, the traditional home of the island's longstanding wine industry. Many of the brewery's products are sold in local restaurants and bars, often with donkey-themed names.
