= Rethymnian Brewery =

Microbrewery in Greece

- Location: Rethymno, Greece
- Owned by: Independent

Active beers
Name	Type
Rethymnian Blonde
Rethymnian Dark

Rethymnian Brewery (Greek: Ρεθυμνιακή Ζυθοποιϊα) is a microbrewery situated near Armeni, Rethymno, Crete, Greece.

The company produces two types of beer using traditional organic methods and according to the German Reinheitsgebot of 1516. The hops are imported from Germany, biologically brewed, and the result is either a Rethymnian Blonde or Rethymnian Dark (both 4.8% ABV).

The beer is bottled in 0.33lt swing-top bottles.
