= Saint Gregory the Illuminator Church, Komotini =

Church in Municipality of Komotini, Greece

Saint Gregory the Illuminator Church
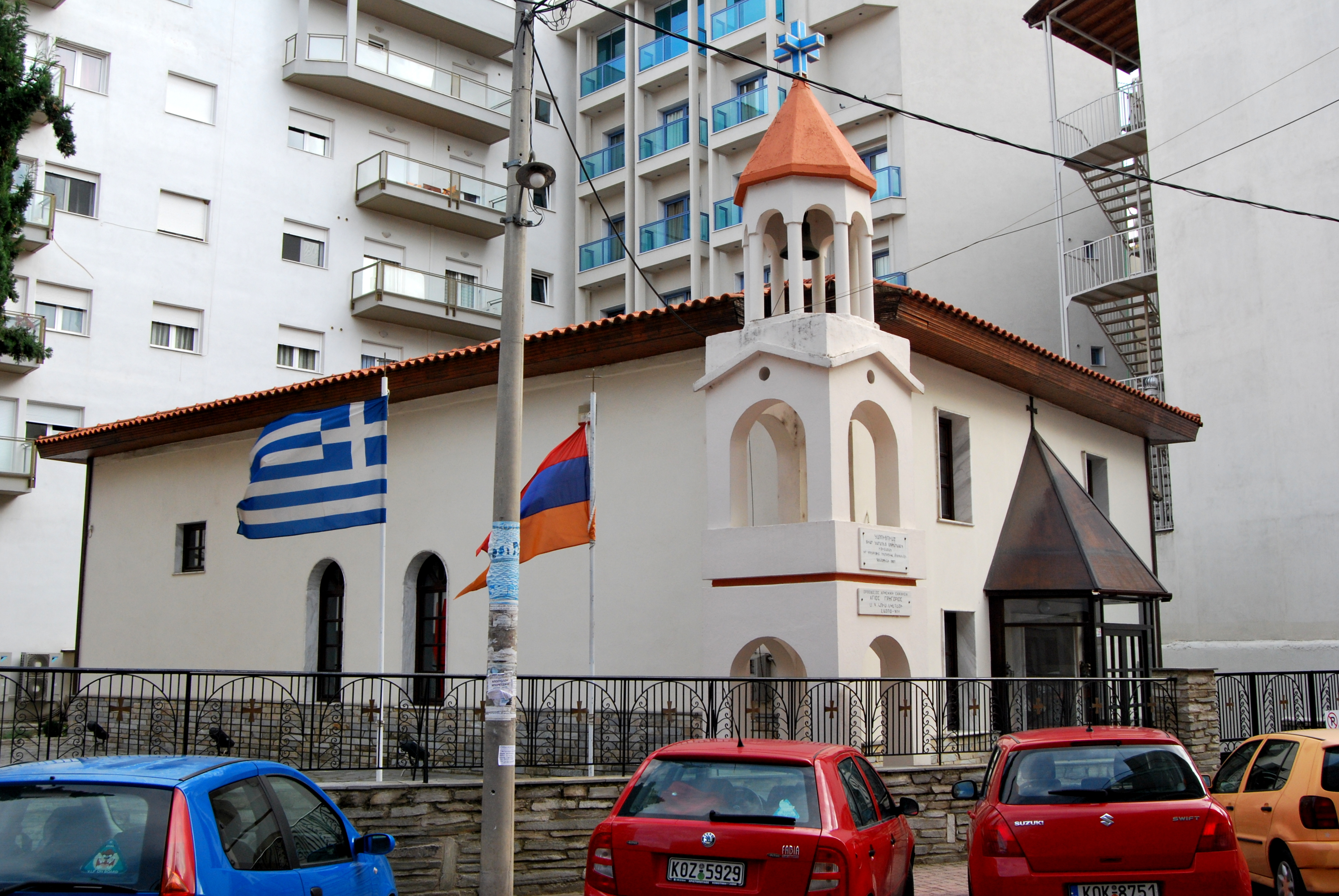
- The church in 2012

Religion
- Affiliation: Armenian Apostolic Church
- Ecclesiastical or organizational status: functioning

Location
- Location: Komotini, Greece
- Interactive map of Saint Gregory the Illuminator Church
- Coordinates: 41.115031°N 25.408036°E

Architecture
- Style: Armenian architecture
- Completed: November 25, 1834

Saint Gregory the Illuminator Church (Armenian: Կոմոտինիի Սուրբ Գրիգոր Լուսավորիչ եկեղեցի, Greek: Ναός Αγίου Γρηγορίου του Φωτιστή), is an Armenian Apostolic church in central Komotini, Greece.

== History ==
The temple was built on a plot of the Armenian community of Komotini and today the surviving inscription is preserved, showing the year of construction and the amount used for the construction of the temple. The church is dedicated to St. James and was administered administratively in the Archdiocese of Adrianople. According to the Armenian religious tradition, there was a plague epidemic in Komotini and it became a vow to St. James, causing the plague to pass. Then the community held an annual "madagh" (Armenian "curban / tama") on the saint, but when the annual "madagh" was forgotten, a new epidemic swept Komotini. The faithful then reiterated the help of the saint and today every second Sunday of December honors St. Jacob in the church for the salvation of the city.
