= Clock tower of Xanthi =

Monument in Xanthi, Greece

Coordinates: 41°8′23″N 24°53′15″E

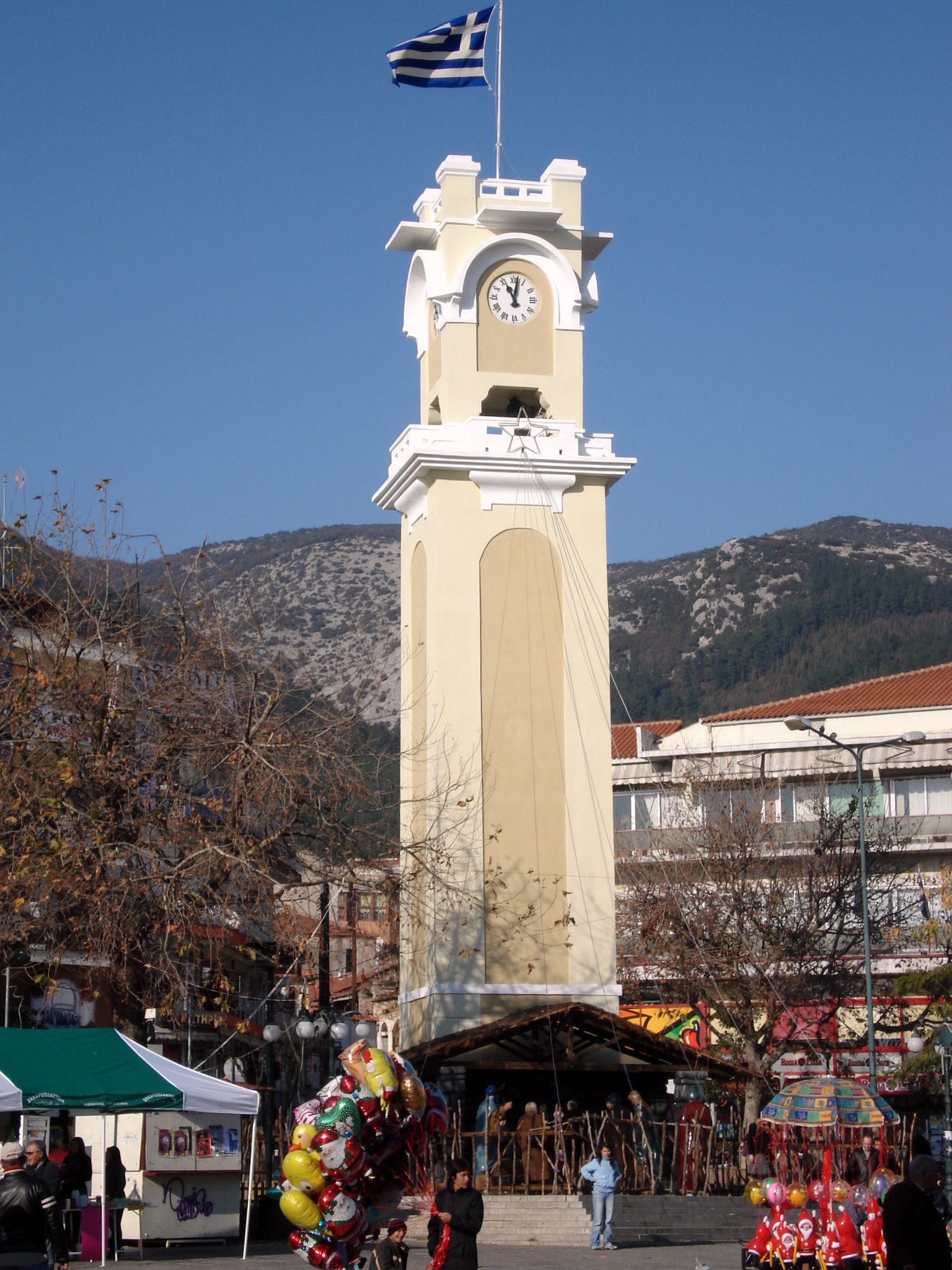
The clock tower of Xanthi

The Clock tower of Xanthi (Greek: Πύργος του Ωρολογίου) is an Ottoman-era monument located in the central square of the town of Xanthi, in northern Greece (region of Western Thrace).

== Description ==
It was built in 1859 by a rich Muslim local named Hadji Emin Agha, as part of his tribute to the central mosque of the town. The clock tower was part of the market mosque complex, which had been renovated in 1938 losing thus its original design due to the art deco additions. In 1941 during the occupation of the area by Bulgarian troops, it was partially destroyed, an in 1972 (during Regime of the Colonels) it was decided to demolish the monument, but after the intervention of the Mufti of Xanthi, the decision was abandoned. During the same period a marble inscription in Arabic text was removed from the monument and destroyed in retaliation for the removal of signs from Greek schools in Istanbul.

== See also ==
- Clock tower of Komotini
- Ottoman Greece
- Ottoman architecture
