= Paschalis Draganidis =

Greek footballer

Personal information
- Full name: Paschalis Draganidis
- Date of birth: August 11, 1992 (age 34)
- Place of birth: Komotini, Greece
- Height: 1.78 m (5 ft 10 in)
- Position: Midfielder

Youth career
- Mesouni F.C.
- Panthrakikos U21

Senior career*
Years	Team	Apps	(Gls)
2009–2012	Panthrakikos	2	(0)
2012–	Anagennisi Epanomi F.C.	18	(0)
- * Club domestic league appearances and goals as of June 30, 2012

Paschalis Draganidis (Greek: Πασχάλης Δραγανίδης, born 11 August 1992) is a Greek footballer, currently playing for Anagennisi Epanomi F.C. in Beta Ethniki.

== Career ==
His professional career began in 2009 when he signed a contract with Panthrakikos.

Career statistics

season	club	league	Championship		Nation cup		Europe cup		Total	
season	club	league	appear	goals	appear	goals	appear	goals	appear	goals
2009–10	Panthrakikos	Super League	2	0	0	0	0	0	2	0
2010-11	Panthrakikos	Beta Ethniki								
career total			2	0	0	0	0	0	2	0
2012–13	Anagennisi Epanomi F.C.	Football league	18	0	0	0	0	0	2	0

Last update: 30 June 2010
