= Yeni Mosque, Komotini =

Mosque in Eastern Macedonia and Thrace, Greece

Yeni Mosque
- Γενί Τζαμί
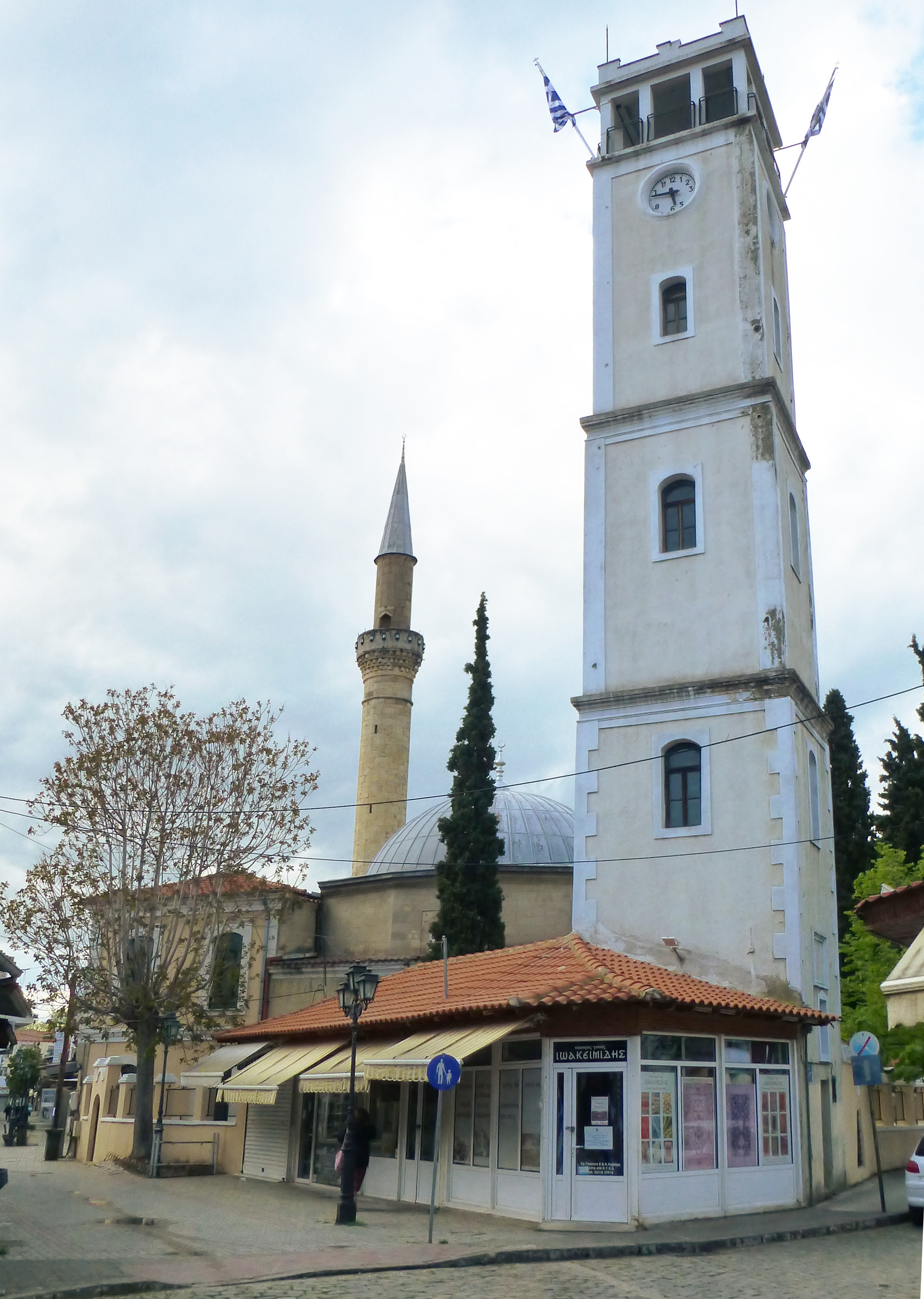

- Location of the mosque in Greece

Religion
- Affiliation: Sunni Islam
- Rite: Hanafi
- Ecclesiastical or organisational status: Mosque
- Status: Active

Location
- Location: Komotini, Eastern Macedonia and Thrace
- Country: Greece
- Interactive map of Yeni Mosque
- Coordinates: 41°07′08″N 25°24′18″E

Architecture
- Type: Mosque
- Style: Ottoman
- Founder: Ekmekçizade Ahmed Pasha
- Completed: 1585

Specifications
- Dome: 1
- Minaret: 1
- Materials: Brick

The Yeni Mosque (Greek: Γενί Τζαμί, from Turkish: Yeni Camii, lit. 'New Mosque'), also known as the Defterdar Ahmet Pasha Mosque, is a mosque in the town of Komotini, in the Eastern Macedonia and Thrace region of Greece. Completed in 1585 CE, during the Ottoman era, it is the only surviving structure in Greece to feature Iznik tiles from the 1580s, the zenith of the Iznik (Nikaia) potters' art.

The mosque is located in the center of Komotini, adjacent to the Muftiate of Rhodope Prefecture. Next to the mosque is the clocktower, and the Ottoman hammams are found in neighboring areas. Ironically, the New Mosque was built before the Old Mosque of 1608.

== History ==
Its founding is attributed to Ekmekçizade Ahmed Pasha who was the chief finance minister (defterdar) in 1606-1613 of Sultan Ahmed I and of Osman II (1618-1622). The külliye of Ekmekçizade Ahmed included a medrese, a double hammam (bathhouse) with sections for men and women (now in ruins), and a mektep. The current form of the mosque dates from 1902.

The mosque has a square prayer hall and has been architecturally influenced by the aesthetics of Greek neoclassicism. The building was refurbished between 2007 and 2008. It is in active service as a place of Muslim worship, serving the large Muslim community of Komotini (Gümülcine in Turkish).

== Gallery ==
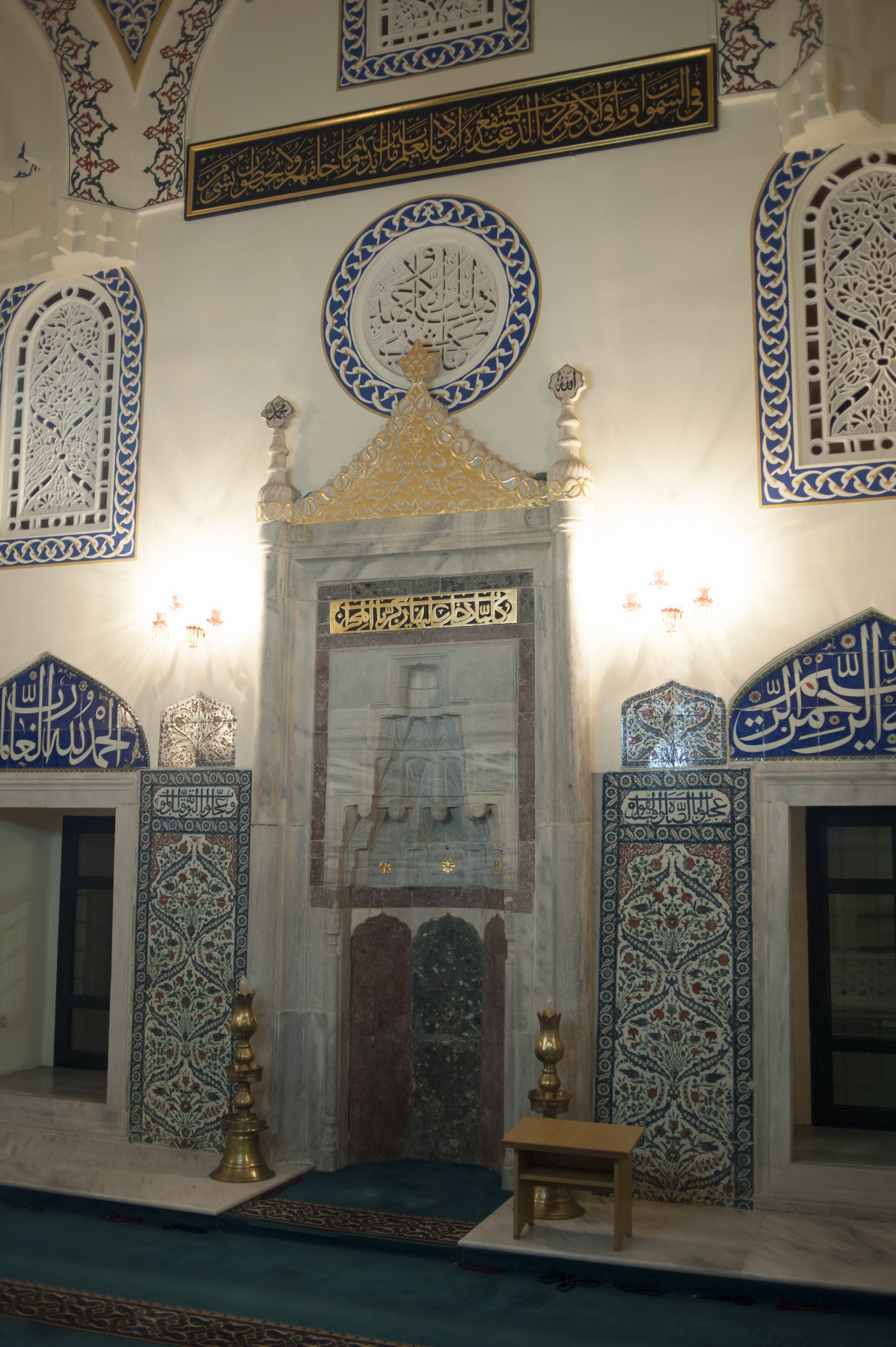
The mosque mihrab

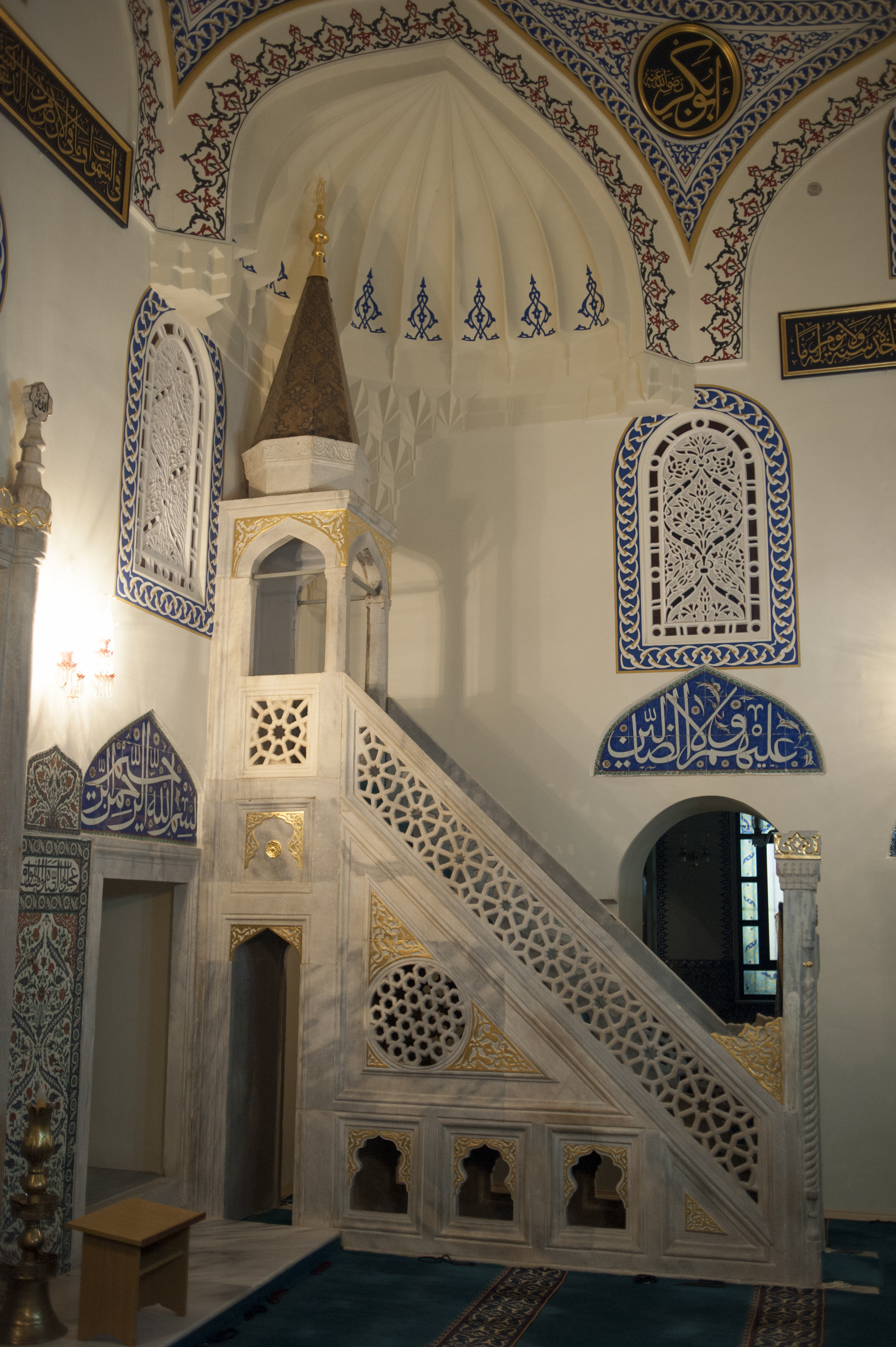
The mosque minbar

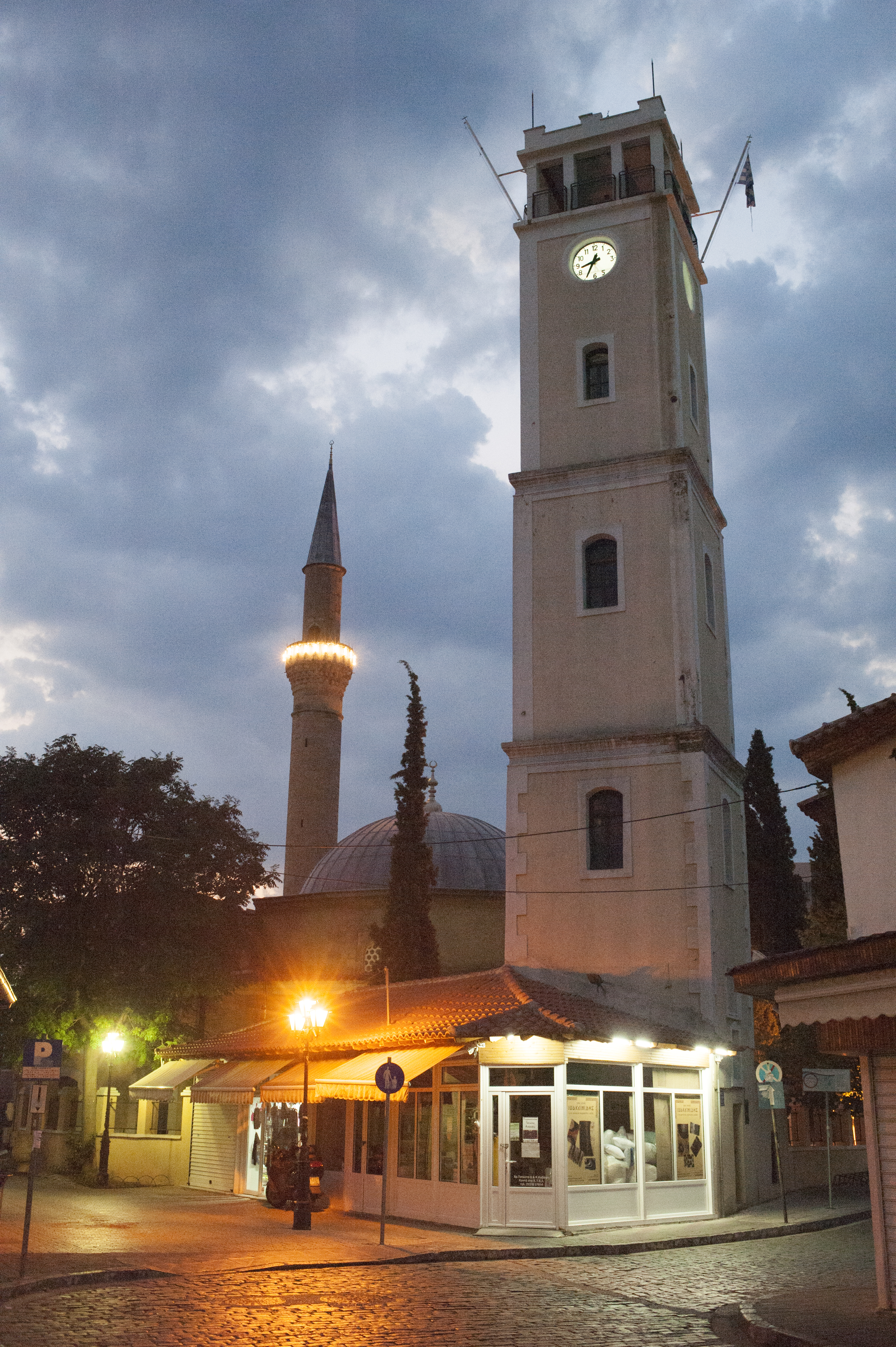
The minaret and adjacent clocktower

== See also ==
- Islam in Greece
- List of mosques in Greece
