= Eski Mosque, Komotini =

Mosque in Komotini, Greece

Eski Mosque
- Εσκί Τζαμί
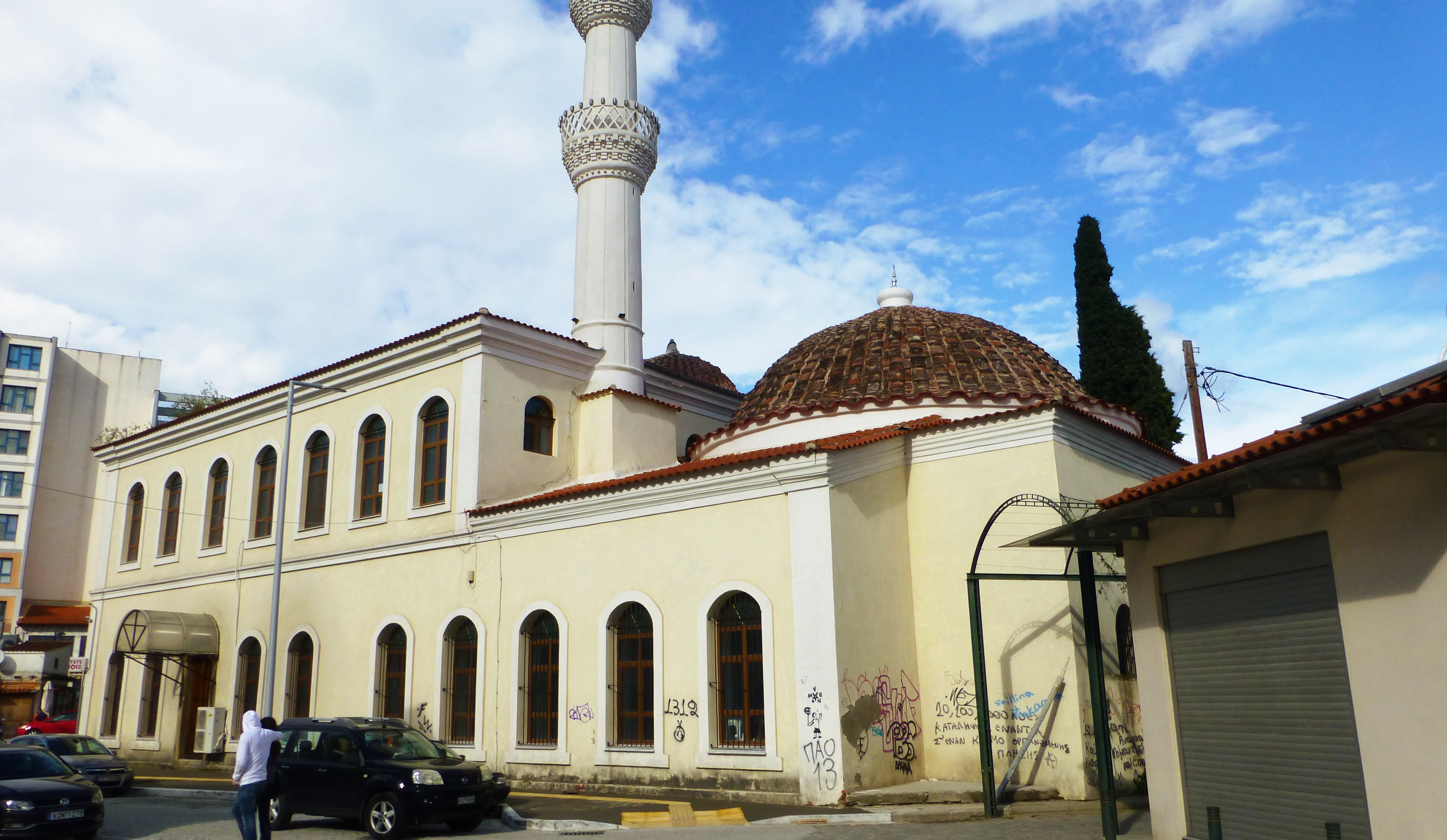
- The mosque in 2012

- Location of the mosque in Greece

Religion
- Affiliation: Sunni Islam
- Sect: Hanafi
- Ecclesiastical or organizational status: Mosque (17th century–1910s); Church (1910s–1920); Mosque (since 1920– )
- Status: Active

Location
- Location: Gravias Street, Komotini, Eastern Macedonia and Thrace
- Country: Greece
- Interactive map of Eski Mosque
- Coordinates: 41°07′12″N 25°24′8″E

Architecture
- Type: Mosque
- Style: Ottoman
- Completed: 17th century

Specifications
- Dome: 1
- Minaret: 2
- Materials: Brick

The Eski Mosque (Greek: Εσκί Τζαμί, from Turkish: Eski Camii, lit. 'Old Mosque'), also known as the Mosque of Two Balconies, is a mosque located on Gravias Street, in the town of Komotini, in the Eastern Macedonia and Thrace region of Greece. The mosque was completed in 1608, or 1677–1688, based on an Ottoman era inscription.

== Overview ==
Despite its name, the Eski Mosque was built after the Yeni Mosque (Turkish: Yeni Camii, lit. 'New Mosque'), completed in 1585. It is likely that an original mosque stood at the site of the Eski Mosque, dating from the time of the Ottoman conquest of the area under Evrenos. According to the 1892 Ottoman salname, the mosque featured an inscription in a "non-Ottoman" language, hence it is possible that the mosque was built on the site of a former Byzantine church.

In the 1910s, the Bulgarians turned the mosque into a church and destroyed part of the minaret (up to the Sherefe). The building was returned to the Muslim minority in 1919–1920, under the French administration of Komotini. The mosque's two existing minarets with balconies were built during that period.

== See also ==
- Islam in Greece
- List of mosques in Greece
