= Komotini =

City in Thrace, Greece

Komotini Κομοτηνή
- Municipality
- Seal

- Location within Greece
- Coordinates: 41°07′19″N 25°24′15″E
- Country: Greece
- Geographic region: Thrace
- Administrative region: Eastern Macedonia and Thrace
- Regional unit: Rhodope

Government
  - Mayor: Ioannis Gkaranis (since 2019)

Area
  - Municipality: 644.93 km^{2} (249.01 sq mi)
  - Municipal unit: 385.4 km^{2} (148.8 sq mi)
- Elevation: 45 m (148 ft)

Population (2021)
  - Municipality: 65,243
  - Density: 101.16/km^{2} (262.01/sq mi)
  - Municipal unit: 60,160
  - Municipal unit density: 156.1/km^{2} (404.3/sq mi)
  - Community: 54,165
- Time zone: UTC+2 (EET)
  - Summer (DST): UTC+3 (EEST)
- Postal code: 691 00, 691 31, 691 32, 691 33
- Area code: 2531X
- Vehicle registration: ΚΟ
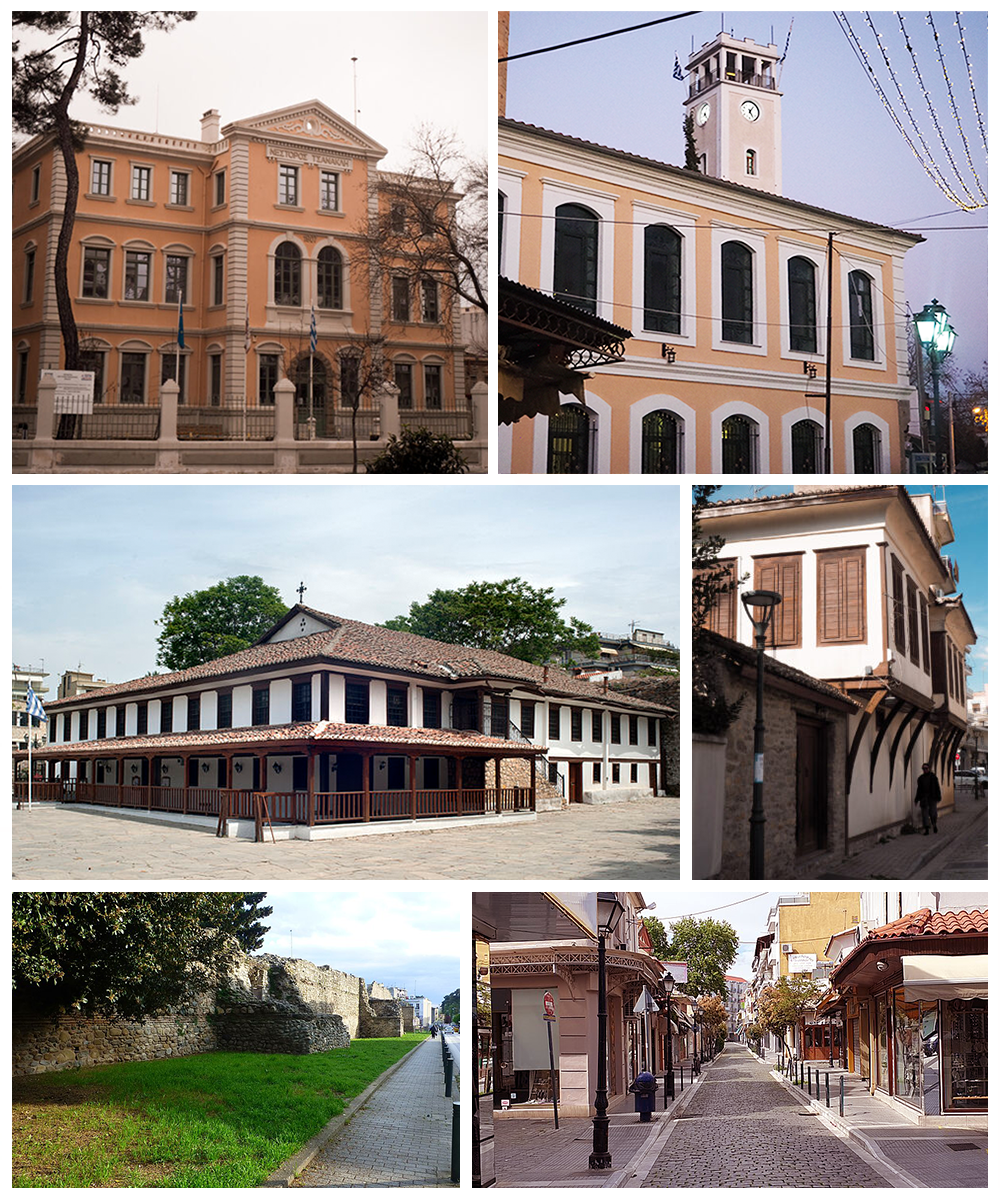
- Website: komotini.gr alt = Komotini montage. Clicking on an image in the picture causes the browser to load the appropriate article, if it exists.

Komotini (Greek: Κομοτηνή, Turkish: Gümülcine, Bulgarian: Гюмюрджина, romanized: Gyumyurdzhina) is a city in the region of East Macedonia and Thrace, northeastern Greece and its capital. It is also the capital of the Rhodope. It was the administrative centre of the Rhodope-Evros super-prefecture until its abolition in 2010, by the Kallikratis Plan. The city is home to the Democritus University of Thrace, founded in 1973. Komotini is home to a sizeable Muslim minority, which was exempted from the population exchange between Greece and Turkey. According to the 2021 census, the municipality of Komotini had a population of 65,243 citizens.

Built at the northern part of the plain bearing the same name, Komotini is one of the main administrative, financial and cultural centers of northeastern Greece and also a major agricultural and breeding center of the area. It is also a significant transport interchange, located 795 km NE of Athens and 281 km NE of Thessaloniki. The presence of the Democritus University of Thrace makes Komotini the home of thousands of Greek and international students and this, combined with an eclectic mix of Western and Oriental elements in the city's daily life, have made it an increasingly attractive tourist destination.

== History ==
=== Antiquity ===
Komotini has existed as a settlement since the 2nd century AD. That is confirmed by archaeological finds of that era up until the 4th century. It is also confirmed by an inscription on the ruins of the 4th-century Byzantine wall, that are visible at various sites in the city, which reads "Theodosiou Ktisma" = Building of Theodosius. The inscription was discovered by the Komotini-born Prof. Stilponas Kyriakidis and the then mayor Sofoklis Komninos. It is said that the settlement originates from the 5th century and is linked to the daughter of the painter Parrasios from Maroneia. During the Roman age it was one of several fortresses along the Via Egnatia highway which existed in the Thrace area. Probably it is to be identified with the Roman station Breierophara (a Thracian toponym from bre (=fortress) + iero (= holy) + phara=para (=pass). The most important city of that period was neighbouring Maximianopolis, former Thracian Porsulis or Paesoulae, which was renamed to Mosynopolis in the 9th century. Komotini was a Via Egnatia hub on its northern route through the Nymphaea Pass which led to the Ardas Valley, Philippopolis (modern Plovdiv) and Byzantine Berroe (modern Stara Zagora).

=== Byzantine era ===
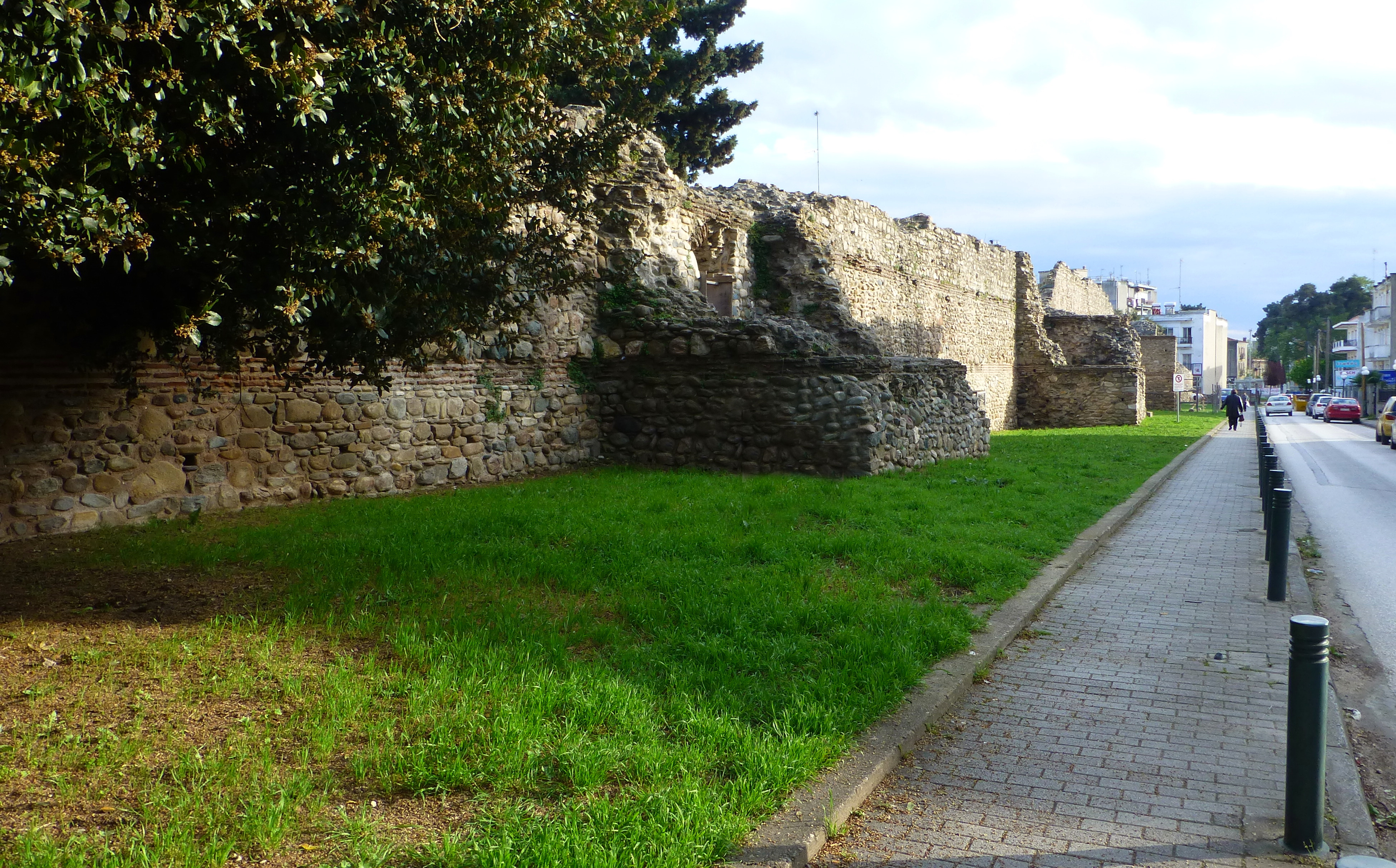
Part of the Byzantine fortress of Komotini.

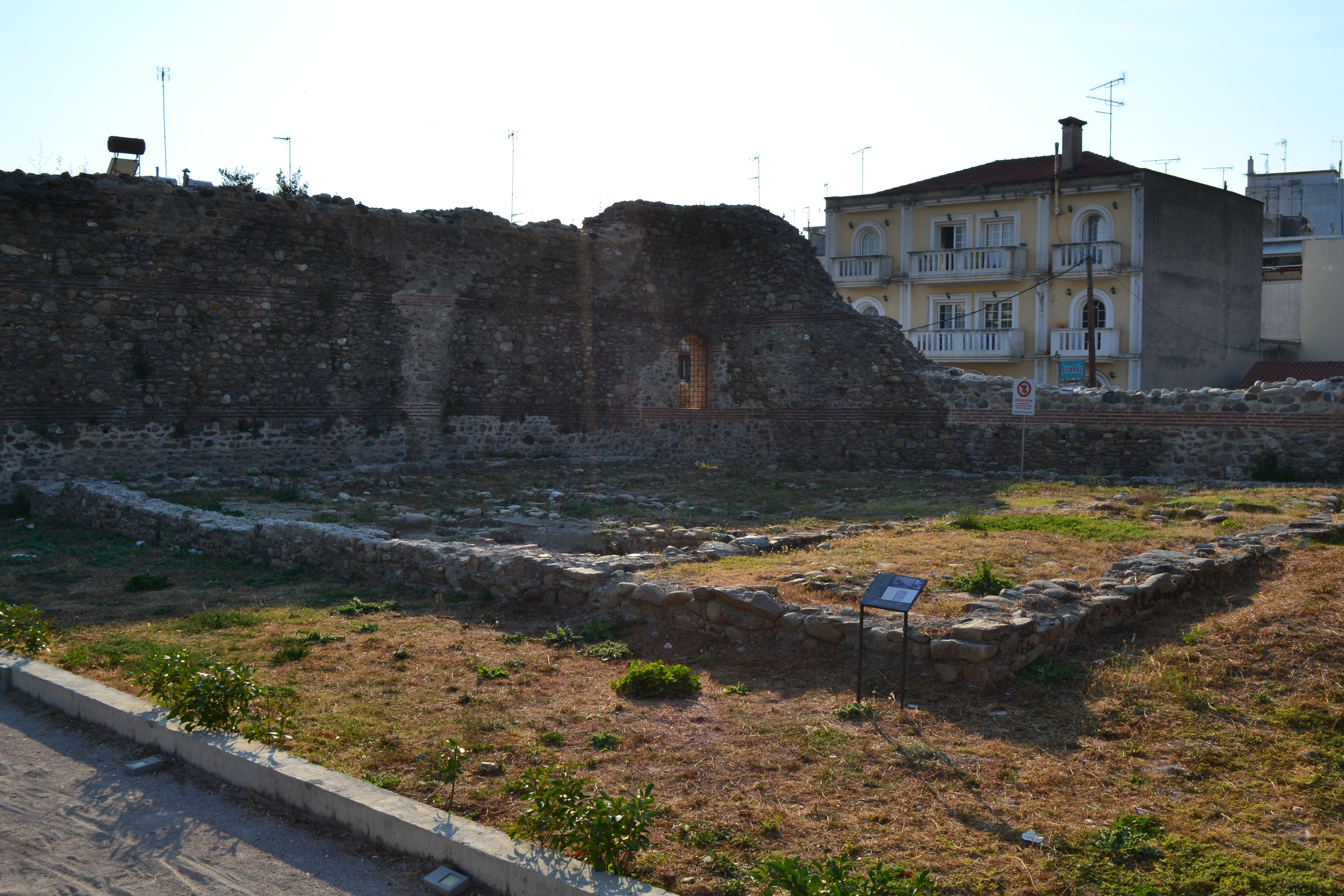
Fortress of Komotini, the remaining foundations of the 19th century Jewish synagogue Beth El demolished in 1994.

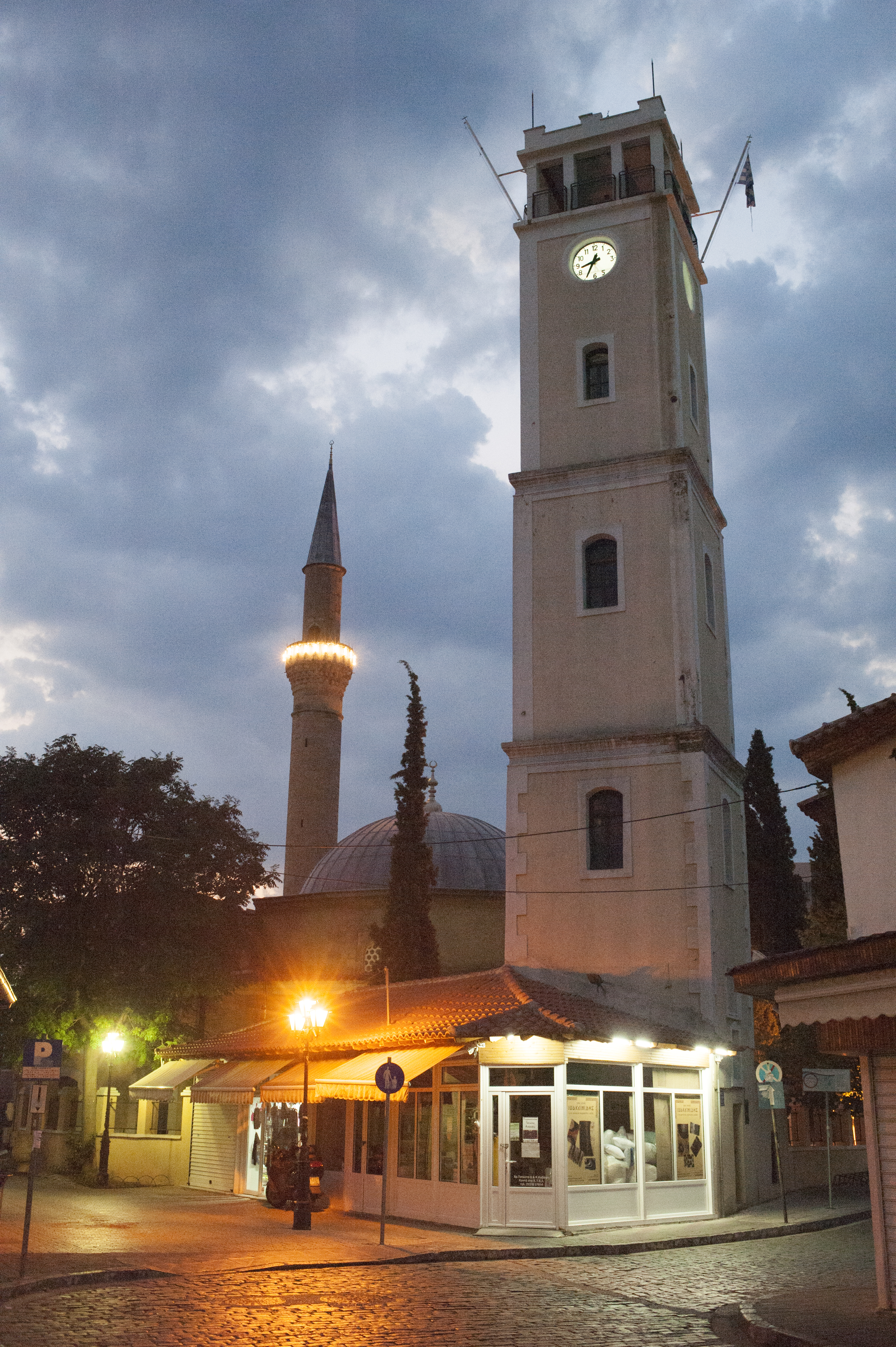
View of the clock tower.

The city's history is closely connected with that of Via Egnatia, the Roman trunk road which connected Dyrrhachium with Constantinople. The Roman emperor Theodosius I built a small rectilinear fortress on the road at a junction with a route leading north across the Rhodope Mountains toward Philippopolis. During the Byzantine period, the city belonged to the Theme of Macedonia, whilst from the 11th century it could be found within the newly founded theme of Boleron. For most of its early existence the settlement was overshadowed by the larger town of Mosynopolis to the west, and by the end of the 12th century, the place had been completely abandoned.

The current settlement dates to 1207, when, following the destruction of Mosynopolis by the Bulgarian tsar Kaloyan, the remnant population fled and established themselves within the walls of the abandoned fortress. Since then the population had been increasing continuously until it became an important town within the area. In 1331 John Kantakouzenos referred to her as Koumoutzina in his account of the Byzantine civil war of 1321–1328. In 1332 Andronikos III Palaiologos set camp in Komotini to face Umur Bey of Smyrna at the Panagia village close to the Panagia Vathirryakos (Fatirgiaka) monastery. However, Umur departed without a battle. In 1341 the historian Nikephoros Phokas referred to the town with its current name. In 1343, during the civil war between John VI Kantakouzenos and John V Palaiologos, Komotini along with the neighbouring forts of Asomatos, Paradimi, Kranovouni and Stylario joined Kantakouzenos' side. John VI Kantakouzenos escaped to Komotini to survive from a battle with the army of the Bulgarian brigand Momchil near the already ruined Mosynopolis.

=== Ottoman era ===
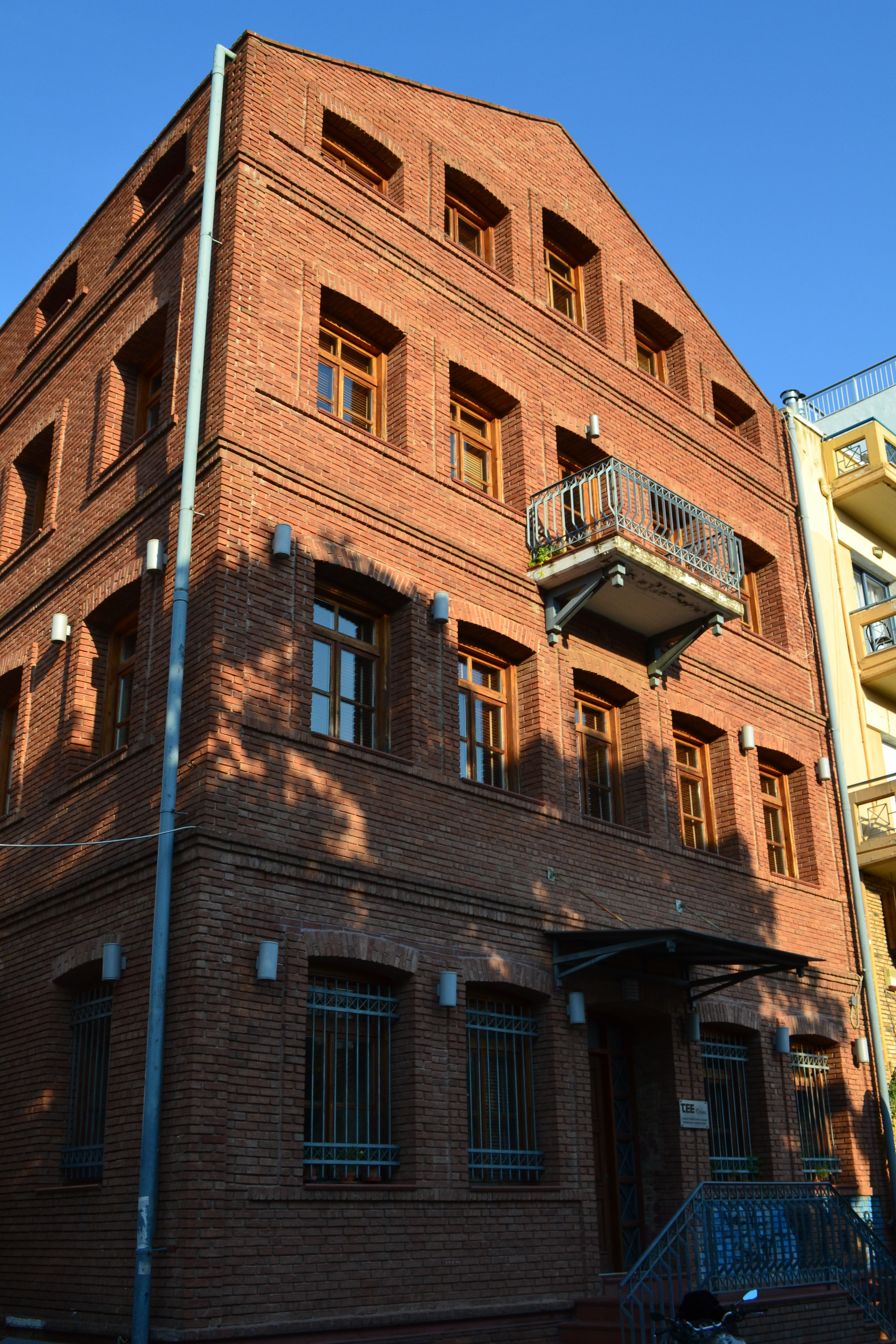
Old tobacco warehouses

The city was conquered by the Ottoman Empire between 1361 and 1362/3, apparently by Gazi Evrenos Bey. Its conquest is placed after the fall of Philippopolis and Stara Zagora, but before the Ottoman capture of Pegae. Already before that, it was called in Turkish as Gümülcine, a version of the demotic Greek form of the city's name, Koumoutsinas. This remained the city's name throughout the Ottoman period (ca. 1361–1912) and continues as its modern Turkish-language name today.

The city continued to be an important hub connecting the capital city of Constantinople with the European part of the Empire, and grew accordingly. Many monuments in the city today date to this era. Many local Greek families fled at that time to Epirus and founded the Koumoutzades village (modern Ammotopos, Arta). Even there they were persecuted by the Ottomans and some of them found refuge in Tropaia of Gortynia. The bond between the inhabitants of Komotini, Ammotopos and Tropaia exists to this day.

In the first two decades after its conquest, until 1383, the city was the seat of a frontier march (uç) under Evrenos, confronting the Serbian territories of Macedonia. The walled city continued to be inhabited by locals, Gazi Evrenos also brought in Turkish settlers to the countryside around the town to stop any riots. During the prevailingly Ottoman rule of the area, it appears that the region was largely supported, and subsequent Ottoman censuses show that Muslim Turks quickly became the dominant element in the rural districts around the city. Evrenos also invested in the city as building camiiye (small mosque), an imaret, bath, and shops outside the city walls, establishing a waqf that according to Machiel Kiel became the "nucleus of Islamic life in Western Thrace". The 16th-century geographer Mehmed-i Ashik also mentions a hostel (imaret) built by Evrenos.

In the 1519 census, the city numbered 393 Muslim households and 197 single (unmarried or widowed) Muslims, 42 Christian households and 14 single Christians, and 19 Jewish households and 5 single Jews, in total ca. 2,500 people. In the 1530 census, the 17 Turkish-named neighbourhoods (mahalle) are mentioned, as well as the existence of one Friday mosque, 16 masjids, 4 zawiyas, 4 schools, and a single church (in the walled city). Nevertheless, the French traveller Pierre Bellon du Mans, who visited the city in 1548, stated that "the city is inhabited by a few Greeks and majority Turks". In the 1600s, the town was graced by new buildings—a small Friday mosque, a double bath, a mekteb, a madrasah, and an imaret—by the defterdar Ekmekcizade Ahmed Pasha, who sponsored numerous such works throughout Thrace. Ahmed's mosque, the Yeni Mosque, which survives to this day, is the only structure in Greece to feature Iznik tiles from the 1580s, the zenith of the Iznik potters' art. When the traveller Evliya Çelebi visited the town in 1667/8, he found "4,000 prosperous, stone-built houses"—likely an exaggeration—in 16 mahalles, with 5 main mosques, 11 masjids, 2 imarets, 2 baths, 5 madrasahs (only one of which survives today), 7 mektebs, 17 caravanserais, and 400 shops.

The town suffered greatly from repeated plague epidemics, which led to entire villages being abandoned, but recovered in the 19th century. During the Greek War of Independence Komotini's inhabitants contributed substantially with Ioannikios (later bishop), Aggelis Kirzalis and Captain Stavros Kobenos (members of the Filiki Eteria organisation). During the following decades Komotini progressed financially due to the processing and trade of tobacco.

The 19th century saw the city expand and considerable architectural activity, with the renovation of old and the construction of new buildings. Both the Yeni Mosque and Evrenos' original masjid, the Eski Mosque, were enlarged by the addition of spacious prayer halls, while Sultan Abdulhamid II erected a clock tower and a madrasah. During his reign, the town became a station in the railway linking Constantinople with Salonica. By the 1880s, the city, capital of the homonymous sanjak in the Edirne Vilayet, boasted 13,560 inhabitants, 10 Friday mosques, 15 masjids, 2 Greek and one Armenian church, a synagogue, 4 madrasahs, two higher schools, ten mektebs, and various other Christian and Jewish schools.

=== Balkan Wars and World Wars ===
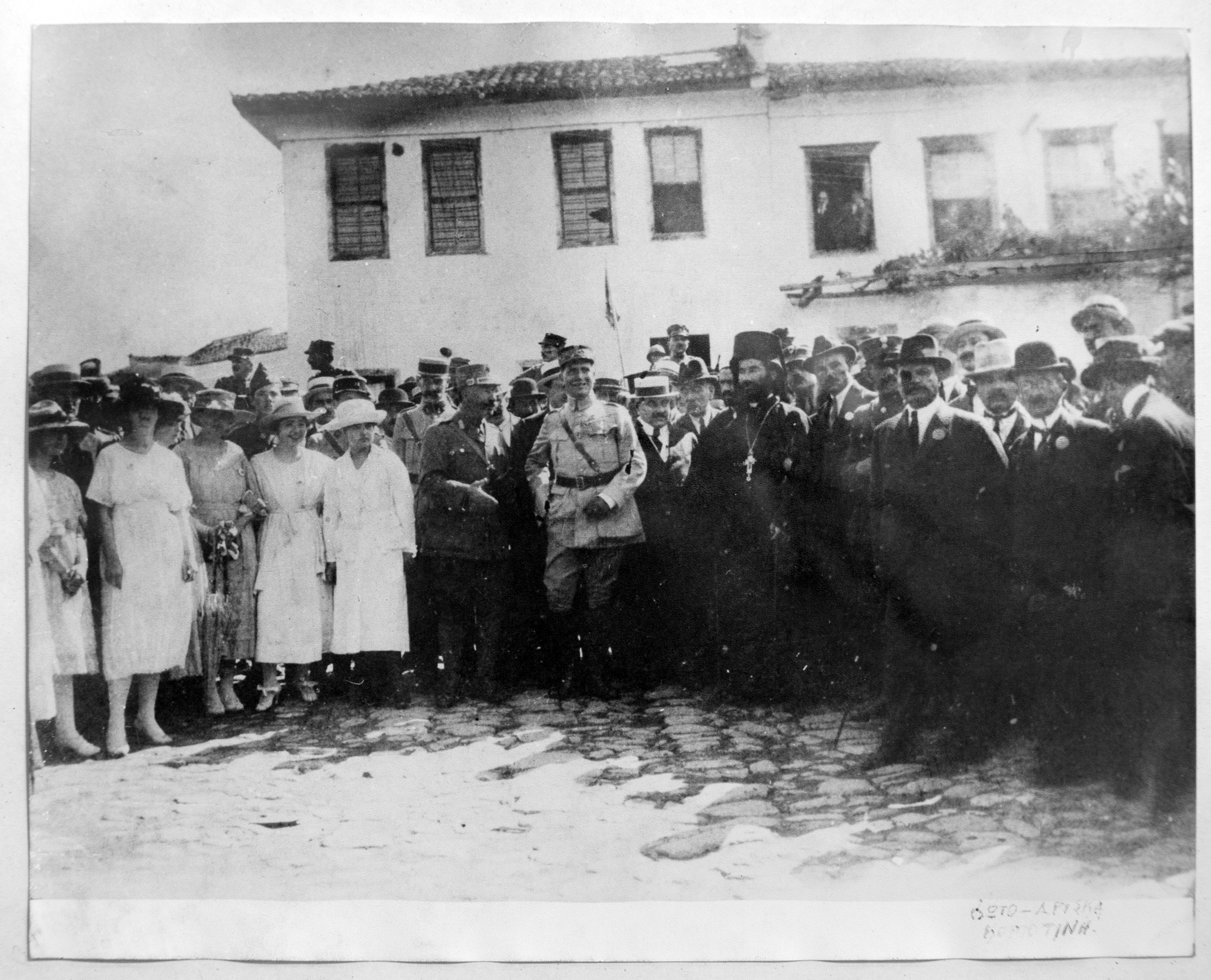
The Greek mission in Komotini after the incorporation of the area (1920)

During the First Balkan War, Bulgarian forces captured the city, only to surrender it to the Greek army during the Second Balkan War on 14 July 1913.

In the aftermath of the Second Balkan War, it became briefly the capital of the short-lived Provisional Government of Western Thrace, but the Treaty of Bucharest, however, handed the city back to Bulgaria. The city was part of Bulgaria until the end of World War I. During this period, the city had the Bulgarian name Гюмюрджина Gyumyurdžina. In 1919 after the end of WWI, with the Treaty of Neuilly, Komotini was handed to Greece, along with the rest of Western Thrace. During WWII the town was under Bulgarian control as part of Belomorie district.

== Demographics ==
The population is quite multilingual for a city of its size and it is made up of local Greeks, Greek refugees from Asia Minor and East Thrace, Muslim population of Turkish, Pomak and Roma origins, descendants of refugees who survived the Armenian genocide, and Pontic Greeks from north-eastern Anatolia and the regions of the former Soviet Union (mainly Georgia, Armenia, Russia and Kazakhstan).

The Muslim population of Western Thrace dates to the Ottoman period, and unlike the Muslim population in other regions of Greece were exempted from the 1922-23 Greek-Turkish population exchange following the Treaty of Lausanne.

== Modern Komotini ==
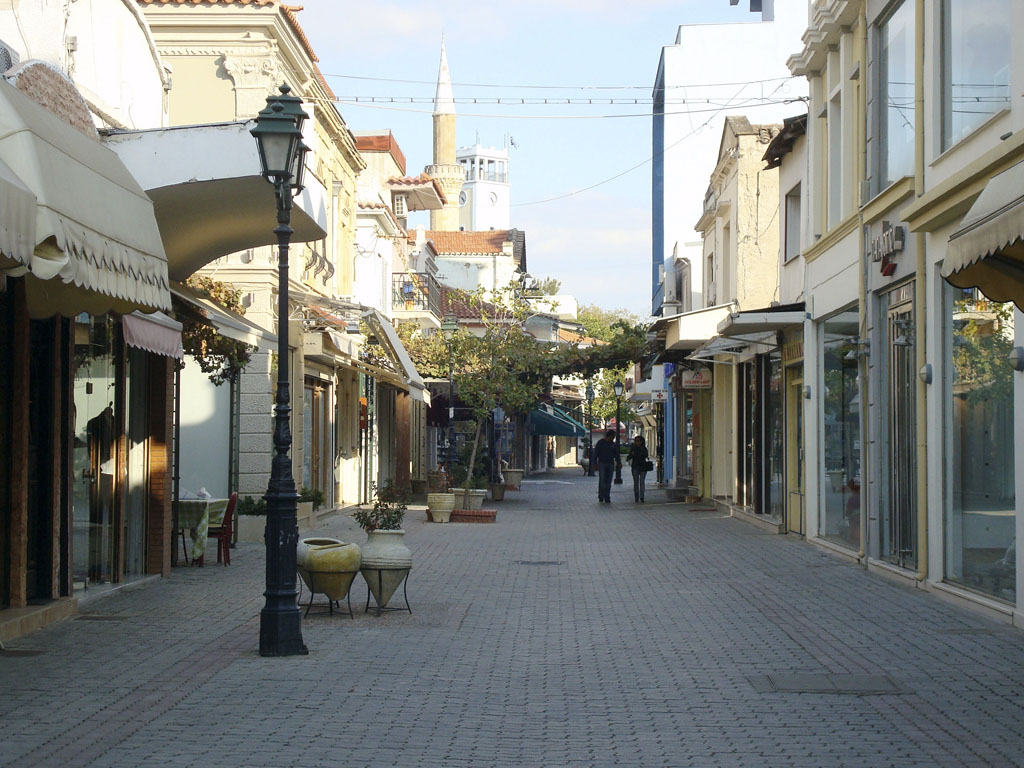
View of a central street.

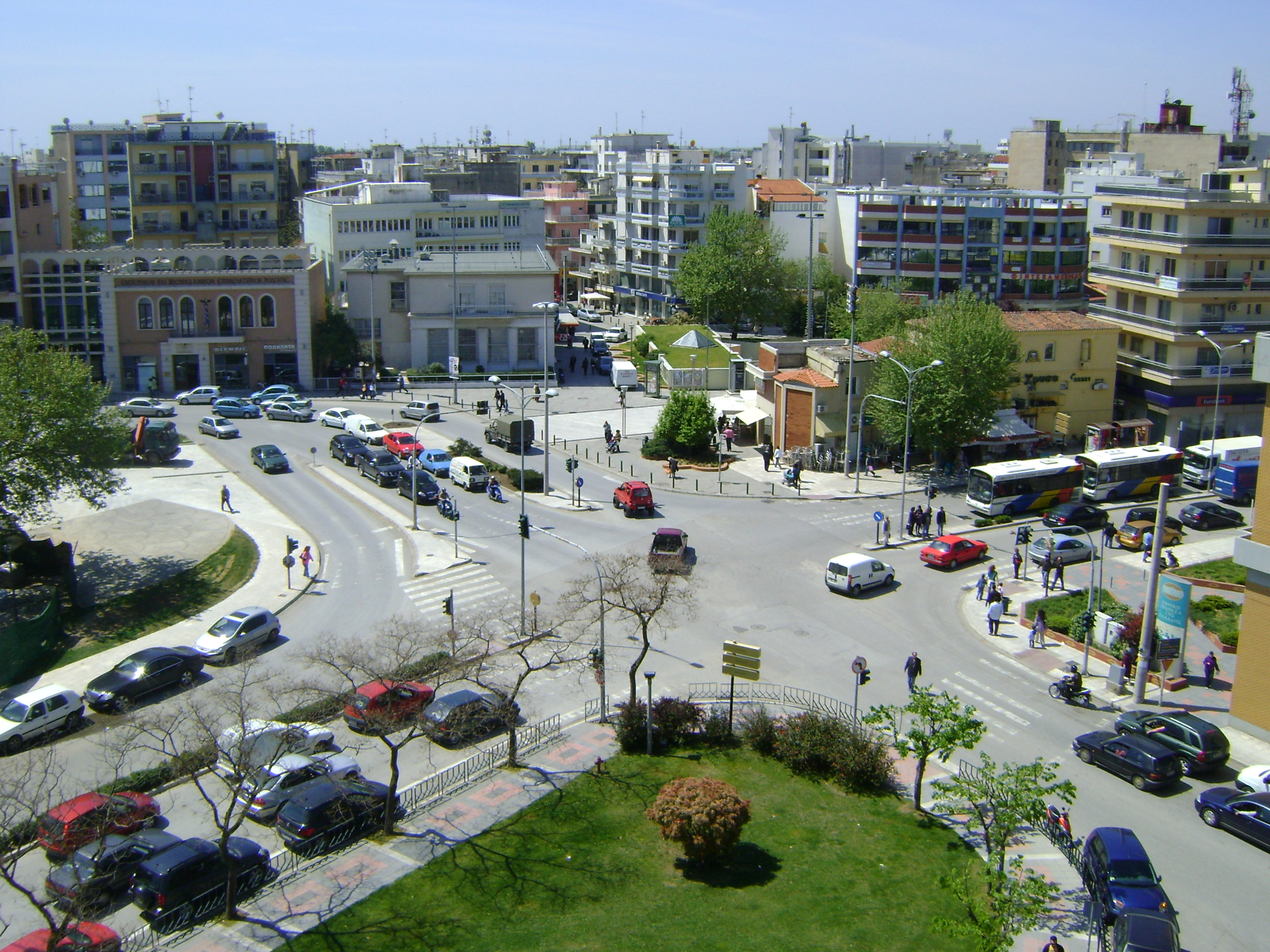
Komotini's centre with the Prefecture building.

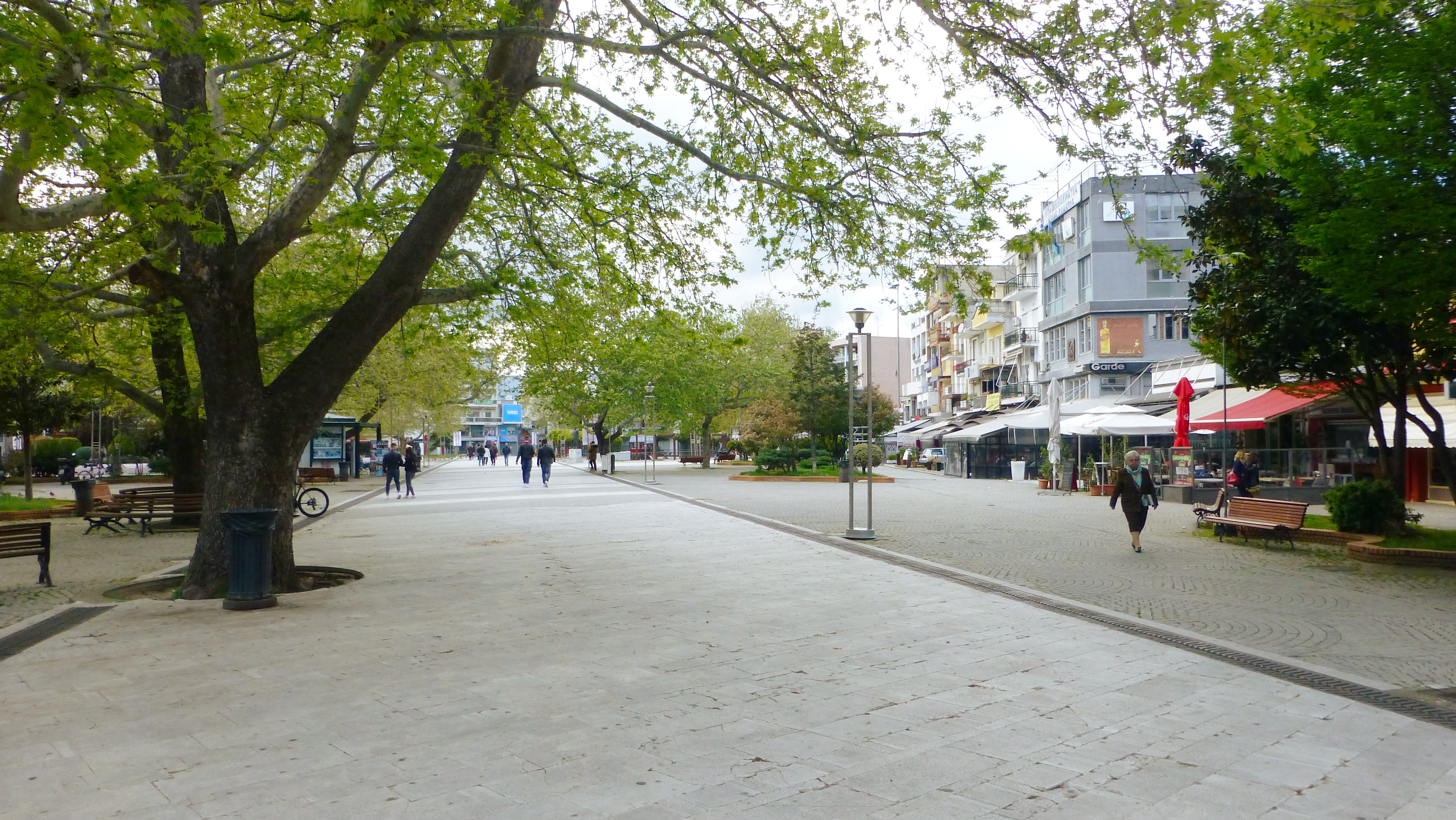
Central square

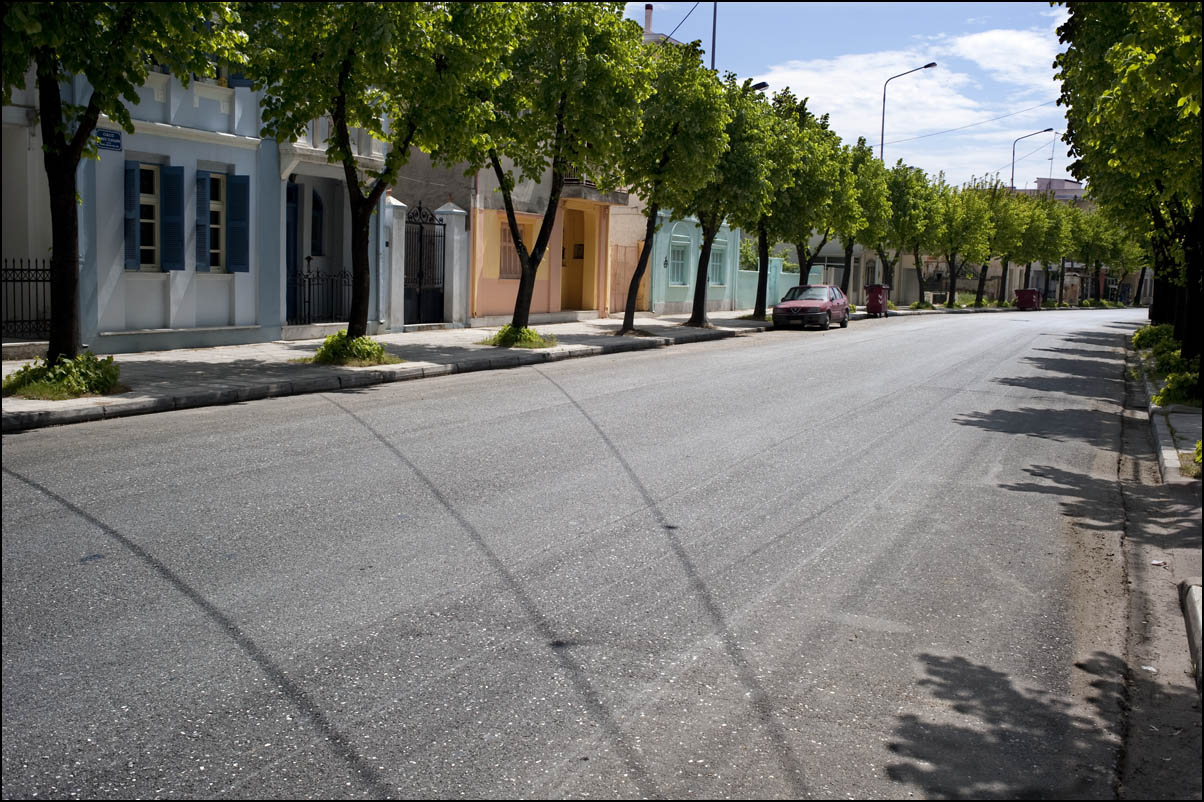
Traditional street.

Komotini is, nowadays, a thriving commercial and administrative centre. It is heavily centralised with the majority of commerce and services based around the historical core of the city. Getting around on foot is therefore very practical. However, traffic can be remarkably heavy due to the daily commute. In the past, the Trelohimaros river used to flow through the city and divide it into two parts. In the 1970s, after repeated flooding episodes the river was eventually diverted and flows on the east of the city, while its former bed has been replaced by the main avenues of the city, such as the Orfeos Street.

=== Heart of the City ===
At the heart of the city lie the evergreen Municipal Central Park and the 15 m-high WW2 Heroes' Memorial, locally known as 'The Sword'. The revamped Central square or Plateia Irinis (Square of Peace) is the focus of a vibrant nightlife boosted by the huge number of students living in the city. The Old commercial centre is very popular with tourists as it houses traditional shops and workshops that have long vanished from other Greek cities. In addition, in the northwestern outskirts of the city (Nea Mosinoupoli) locals and tourists alike flock into a modern shopping plaza: Kosmopolis Park, which houses department stores, shops, supermarkets, a cinema complex, cafés and restaurants. The area stretching from Kosmopolis to Ifaistos is gradually becoming a retail destination in its own right.

=== Culture and Entertainment ===
Komotini began life as a Byzantine Fortress built by the Emperor Theodosius in the 4th century AD. The ruins of this quadrangular structure can still be found NW of the central square. Komotini has several museums including the Archaeological, Byzantine and Folklore museums. SW of the central square one can find the Open-air Municipal Theatre, which hosts many cultural shows and events such as the cultural summer (πολιτιστικό καλοκαίρι = politistiko kalokairi). There is a Regional Theatre (DIPETHE) whose company produces many plays all year round. 6 kilometres (4 miles) NE of Komotini is the Nymfaia forest. It has recreational facilities which comprise trails, courts, playgrounds and space for environmental studies. The forest is divided by a paved road which leads to the ruins of yet another Byzantine fortress and the historical (WWII) fort of Nymfaia.

=== Jewish Community ===
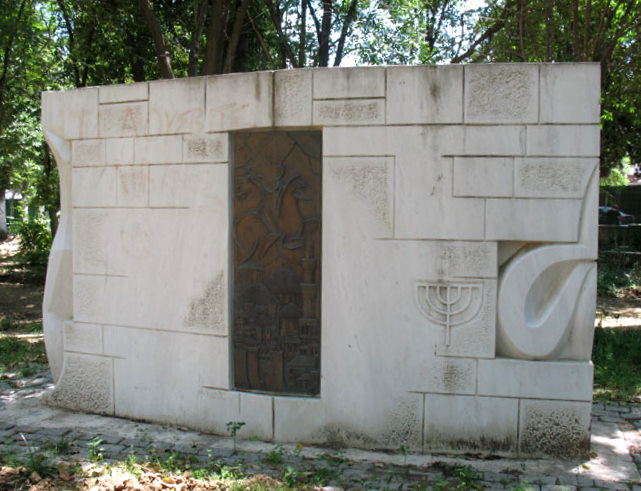
The monument for the Holocaust.

Writings in the area of ancient Maroneia confirm the presence of Jews in the area. In the 16th century the Jewish community of Komotini consisted of Sephardite Jews who were textile and wool merchants. Many of the Jews had come to Komotini as immigrants from Edirne and Thessaloniki. The Jewish community was concentrated within the ancient walls of the city and was expanded after 1896 to the west, along Makavaion street (renamed Karaoli), where the Jewish school and Jewish club were located. The synagogue Beth El was built in the 19th century within the citadel and was enlarged in stages, as late as in 1914. The synagogue was used as a stable during WWII, and later stood abandoned for many years. After the roof collapsed in 1993, the synagogue was demolished in 1994. In 1900 there were 1,200 Jews. In 1910 the Alliance Israelite Universelle School started functioning. Greek, French and Hebrew were taught in the school. In 1912–13 many Jews moved to larger cities such as Thessaloniki and Istanbul. After the liberation of Komotini (May 1920) the Israelite community of Komotini had a Cultural Club and Charity organisations. During the Bulgarian administration, the Bulgarians (Nazi allies) arrested 863 Jews and sent them to the concentration camp of Treblinka where they were exterminated (28 survived the Holocaust). In 1958 the Israelite community was dissolved due to lack of members. In 2004 the municipality of Komotini created a memorial (southern entrance of Central Park) for the victims of the Holocaust.

== Geography ==
The city stands at an altitude of 32-38m on the Thracian plain near the foothills of the Rhodope Mountains. It is situated between two rivers, Boklutzas on the west and Trelohimaros on the east (which form, alongside the Karidia stream, the river Bosbozis). There is little urban planning in the older parts of city, in contrast to more recently developed quarters. According to the 2011 census, the municipality's population amounts to 66,919, a number that does not include approximately 12,000 resident students, trainees and soldiers. There are two airports near Komotini. The nearest is in Alexandroupoli (65 km), and the other is in Kavala (80 km). It has rail and bus links to all continental Greek cities as well as Istanbul, and the good provincial road network has been supplemented by the new A2 motorway, also known as the Egnatia Odos.

=== Climate ===
Climate data for Komotini, Greece
Month	Jan	Feb	Mar	Apr	May	Jun	Jul	Aug	Sep	Oct	Nov	Dec	Year
Mean daily maximum °F (°C)	48 (9)	50 (10)	55 (13)	64 (18)	73 (23)	82 (28)	88 (31)	88 (31)	79 (26)	69 (21)	58 (14)	50 (10)	67 (19)
Mean daily minimum °F (°C)	33 (1)	34 (1)	38 (3)	45 (7)	53 (12)	61 (16)	65 (18)	65 (18)	58 (14)	51 (11)	42 (6)	36 (2)	48.416 (9.12)
Source: <World Weather Online= >"Komotini Monthly Climate Averages". Komotini Monthly Climate Average, Greece. World Weather Online. 2016.

== Municipality ==
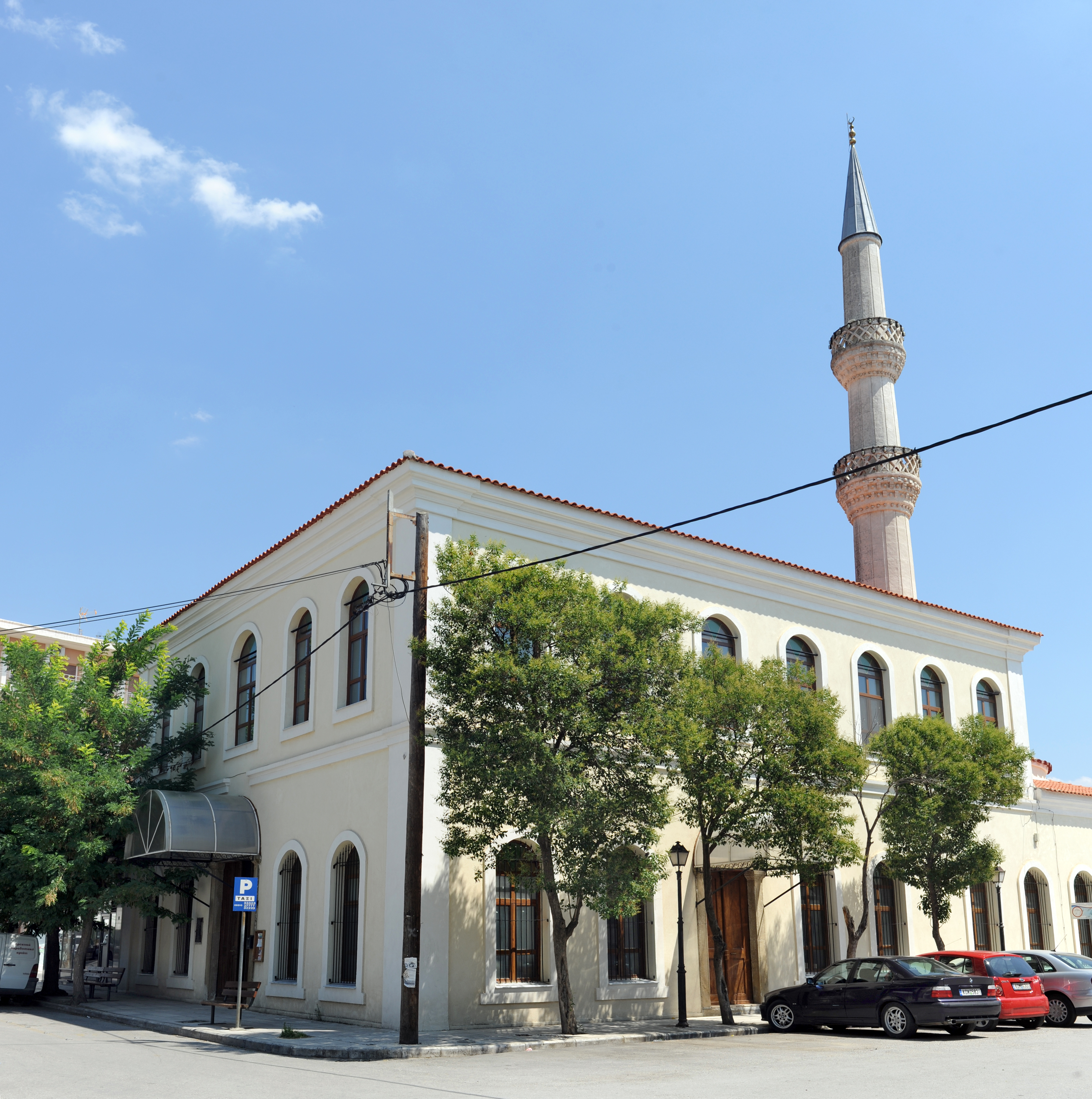
Eski Mosque

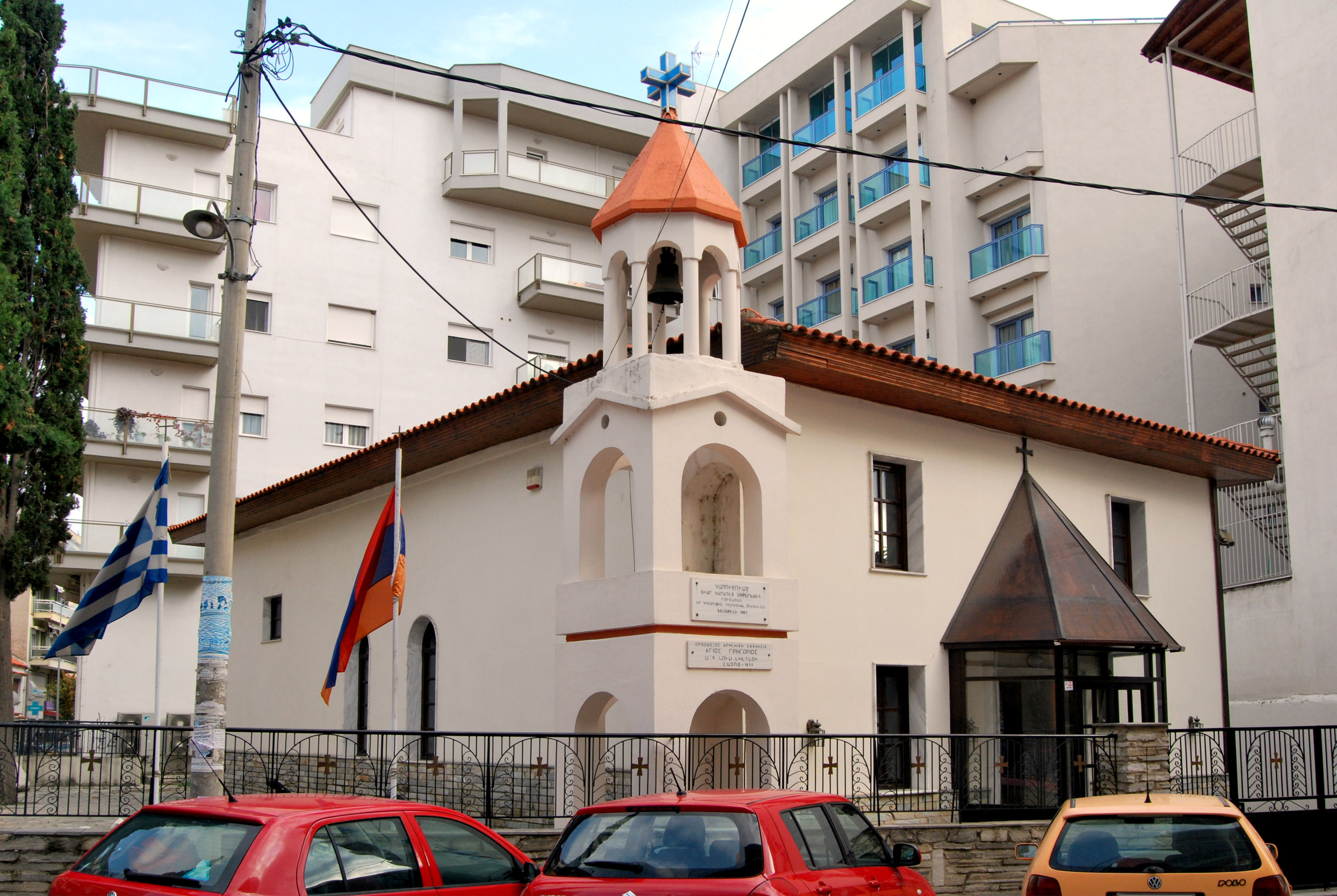
Saint Gregory Illuminator Armenian church

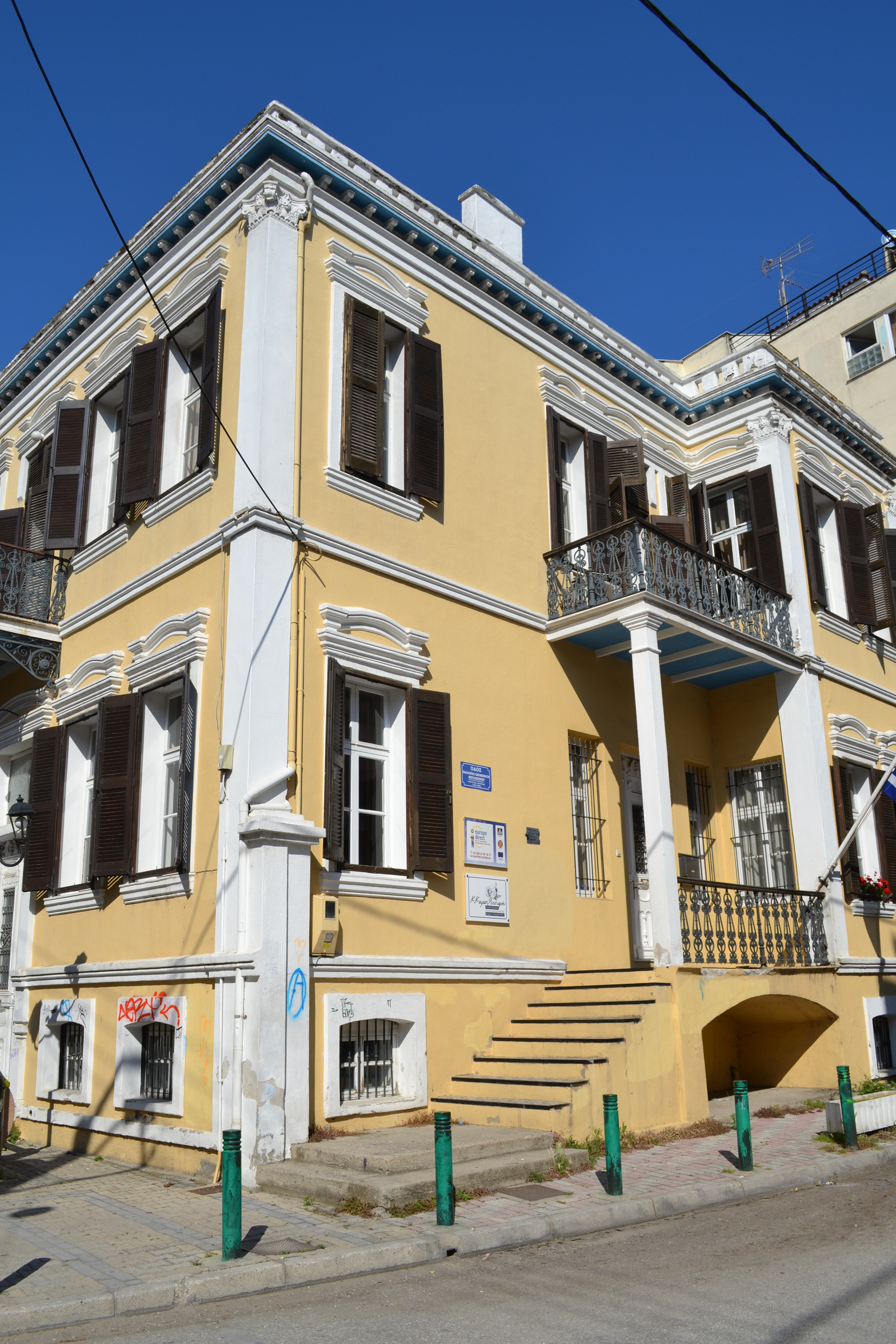
Tsanaklis mansion

The municipality Komotini was formed at the 2011 local government reform by the merger of the following 3 former municipalities, that became municipal units:

- Aigeiros
- Komotini
- Neo Sidirochori

The municipality has an area of 644.934 km^{2}, the municipal unit 385.386 km^{2}.

=== Quarters ===
- Central: Historic Commercial Centre, Plaka, Armenio
- West: Nea Mosinoupoli, Remvi
- South-West: Kavakliotika, Stathmos, Ergatika Stathmou, Ergatika DEI
- South: Zimvrakaki
- South-East: Agios Stylianos
- East: Neoktista
- North: Agia Varvara/Stratones

=== Suburbs ===
- Komotini Industrial Zone (SE, 9 km (6 mi) from City centre), with dozens of factories and an environmentally friendly natural gas-fuelled power plant.
- Panepistimioupoli/Democritus University Campus (NW,3 km (2 mi) from City Centre) home of D.U.TH.
- Ifaistos (NW, adjacent to Nea Mosinoupoli), home of a large Roma community
- Roditis (SE,5 km (3 mi) from City Centre), residential area with upmarket properties
- Karidia (NE,4 km (2 mi) from City Centre), residential area with upmarket properties
- Kosmio (S,3 km (2 mi) from City Centre), residential area
- Thrilorio (SE,8 km (5 mi) from City Centre), residential area
- Ampelokipoi (SE,2 km (1 mi) from City Centre), residential area
- Kikidio (SE,2 km (1 mi) from City Centre), mixed residential-business area
- Ifantes (W, 2 km (1 mi) from City Centre), mixed residential-business area

== Province ==
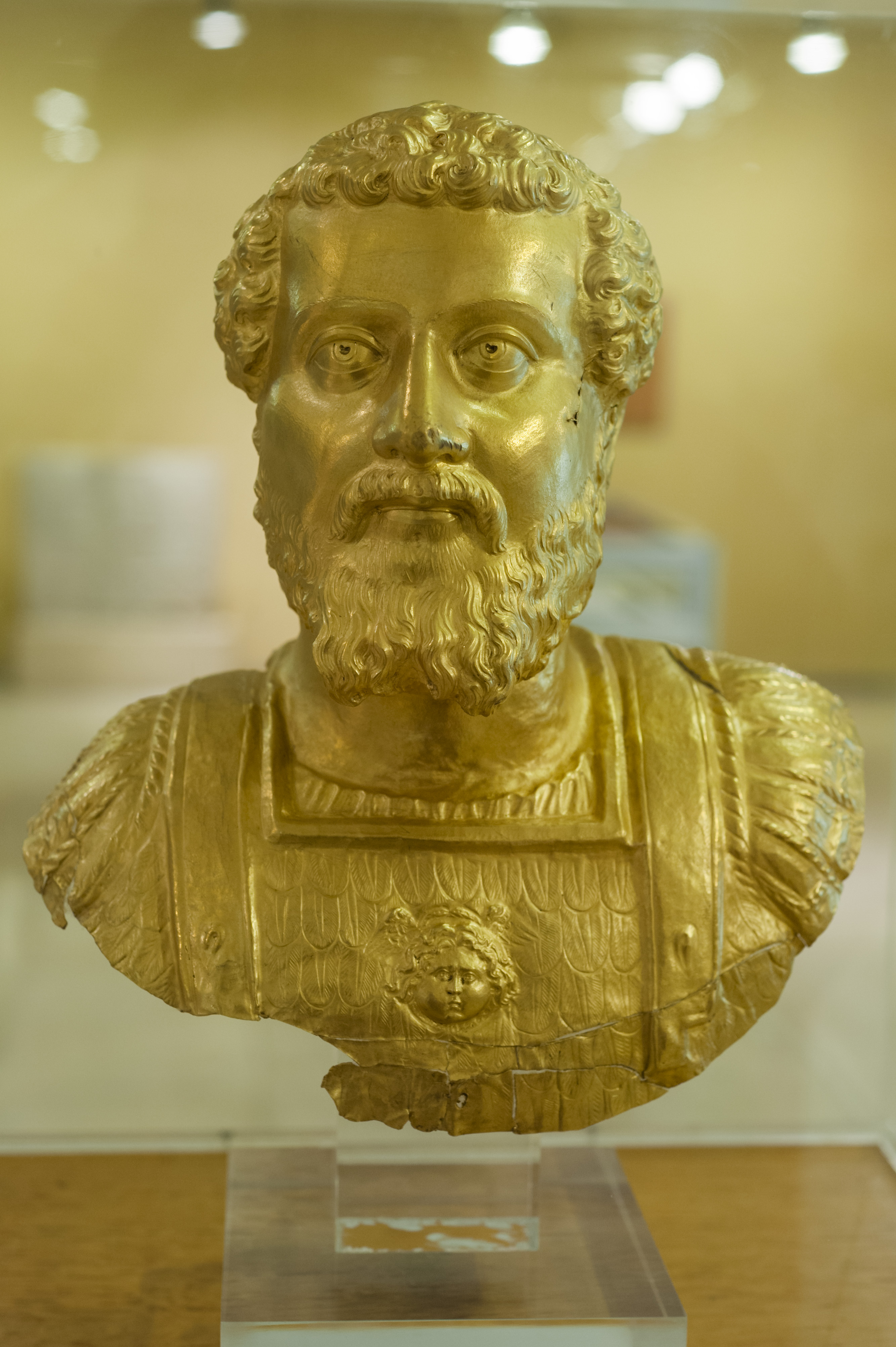
The Golden Bust of Septimius Severus.

The province of Komotini (Greek: Επαρχία Κομοτηνής) was one of the provinces of the Rhodope Prefecture. Its territory corresponded with that of the current municipalities Komotini and Iasmos, and the municipal units Maroneia and Organi. It was abolished in 2006.

== Education ==
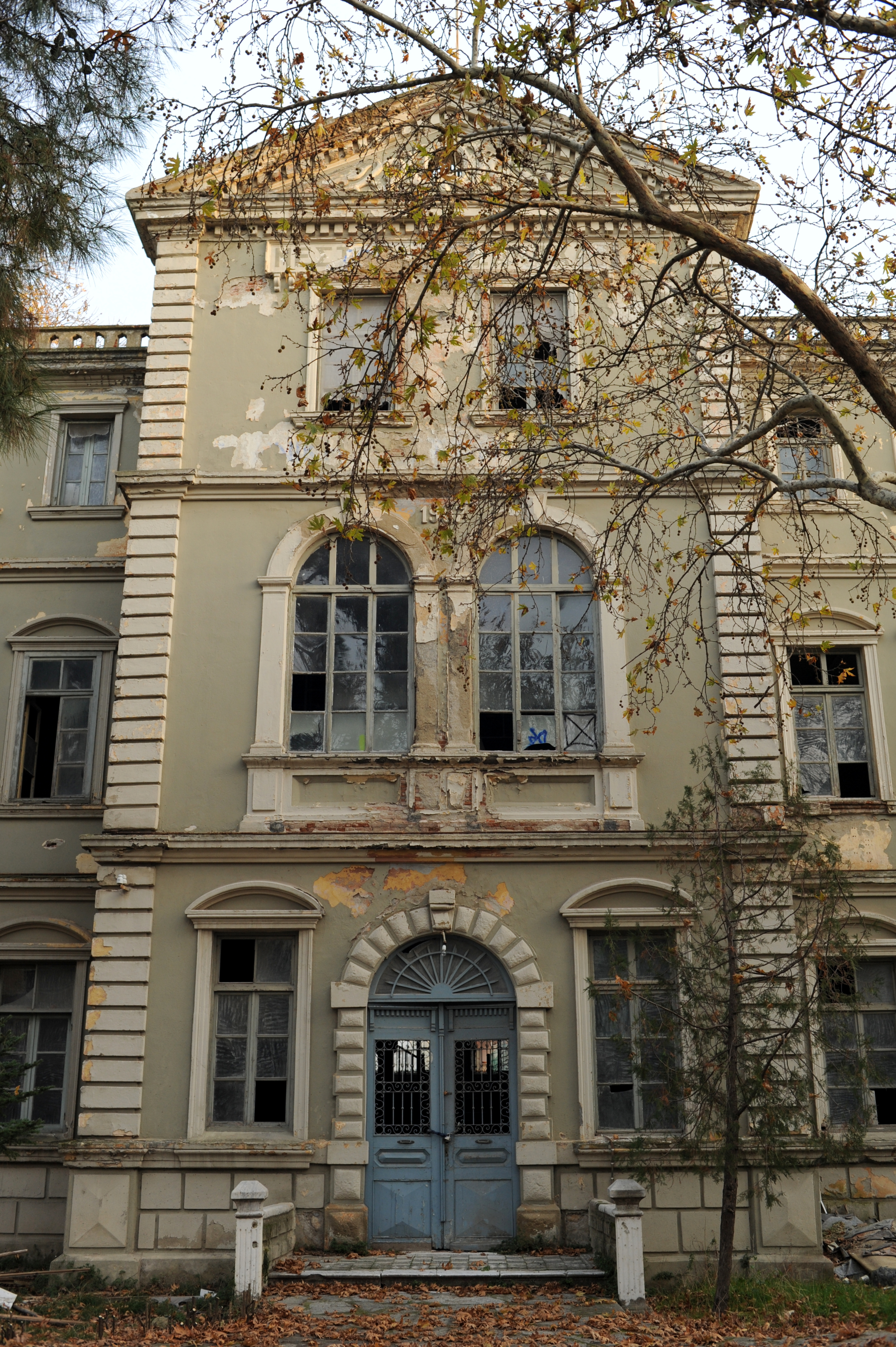
Building of the Democritus University of Thrace

There are more than adequate primary and secondary education facilities in the city. There are around 20 primary schools, 7 gymnasia (junior high schools) and 4 lykeia (high schools) as well as the Institute for Vocational Training (IEK Komotini). In addition there is 2 technical education institutes (TEE).

Komotini is an established university city in the North of Greece. It is home to the Central Administration and several departments of the Democritus University of Thrace including the following:

- Law School
- Physical Education and Sport Sciences
- History and Ethnology
- Greek Literature
- Social Administration
- International Financial Relations and Development
- Business Management (commencing in 2009)
- Politics (commencing in 2009)
- Languages, Literature and Civilization of Black Sea countries

The Komotini campus has a dynamic population of approximately 5–10.000 students and a major part of social life evolves around it. The founding of the University of Thrace in 1973 has had a significant positive influence on the entire urban area fuelling the city's expansion and growth.

The Police Academy is located 7 kilometres (4 miles) from Komotini on the road to Xanthi on extensive grounds and with modern facilities.

== Media ==
=== Television ===
The main television station based in Komotini is R Channel although other stations broadcast from the city, namely Delta from neighbouring Alexandroupoli and ET3 (the northern branch of the Hellenic Broadcasting Corporation) from Thessaloniki.

=== Radio ===
The main Radio Stations broadcasting from Komotini are:

- ERA Komotinis (part of the national ERA network, greatest coverage area in N. Greece)
- Radio Paratiritis
- Diavlos Rodopis
- Hit FM
- Joy FM
- Radio Komotini
- Isik FM
- Radio City

=== Press ===
There has been increasing activity in this sector for the last 50 years. There are now 7 daily and 2 weekly active newspapers in the city.

- Paratiritis tis Thrakis (Observer of Thrace): Multilingual (recognised with distinction by the President of The Hellenic Republic for its innovation) politics and culture.
- To Elefthero Vima (Free Standpoint): Politics and culture.
- Thrakiki Agora (Thracian Market): Weekly Politics and Financial news.
- I Paremvasi (Intervention): Politics.
- I Foni tis Rodopis (Voice of Rodopi): Politics.
- Antifonitis (The Opposition): Reactionary Politics, satirical commentary.
- Thrakiki Gi (Thracian Land): Politics and Agricultural News.
- I Patrida (The Homeland): One of the oldest, Politics.

All of the above are paper based. However, there is an increasing volume of news and content that is on the newspapers' websites. The latter can be accessed from the news section of Komotini's commercial portal.

== Transportation ==
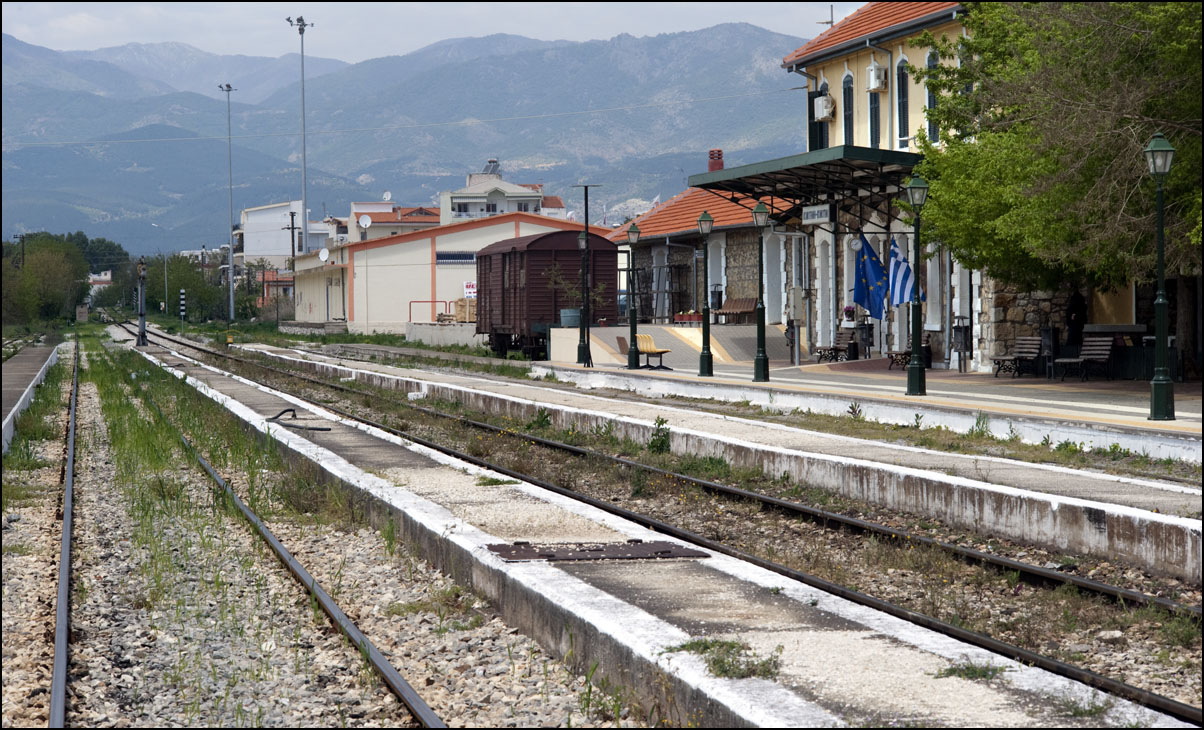
The railway station.

Komotini is a midland city and has no port. It is served by two airports. The nearest is in Alexandroupoli (65 km), and the other is in Kavala (80 km).

=== Highway network ===
European route E90 runs through the city and connects Komotini with the other Greek Continental cities. The Egnatia Odos (A2 motorway) lies south of the city. One can enter the city from one of two Junctions; 'Komotini West' and 'Komotini East'.

=== Public transit ===
There are a number of municipal buses serving 3 main lines within the city. The Intercity Bus Company of Komotini connects it to many local villages, the coastal areas and major Greek cities.

=== Railway ===
The city is served by Hellenic Train, with services running regularly at least twice daily westwards to Thessaloniki and Athens and eastwards to Evros and occasionally Istanbul. The station is located outside the city Center.

== Sports ==
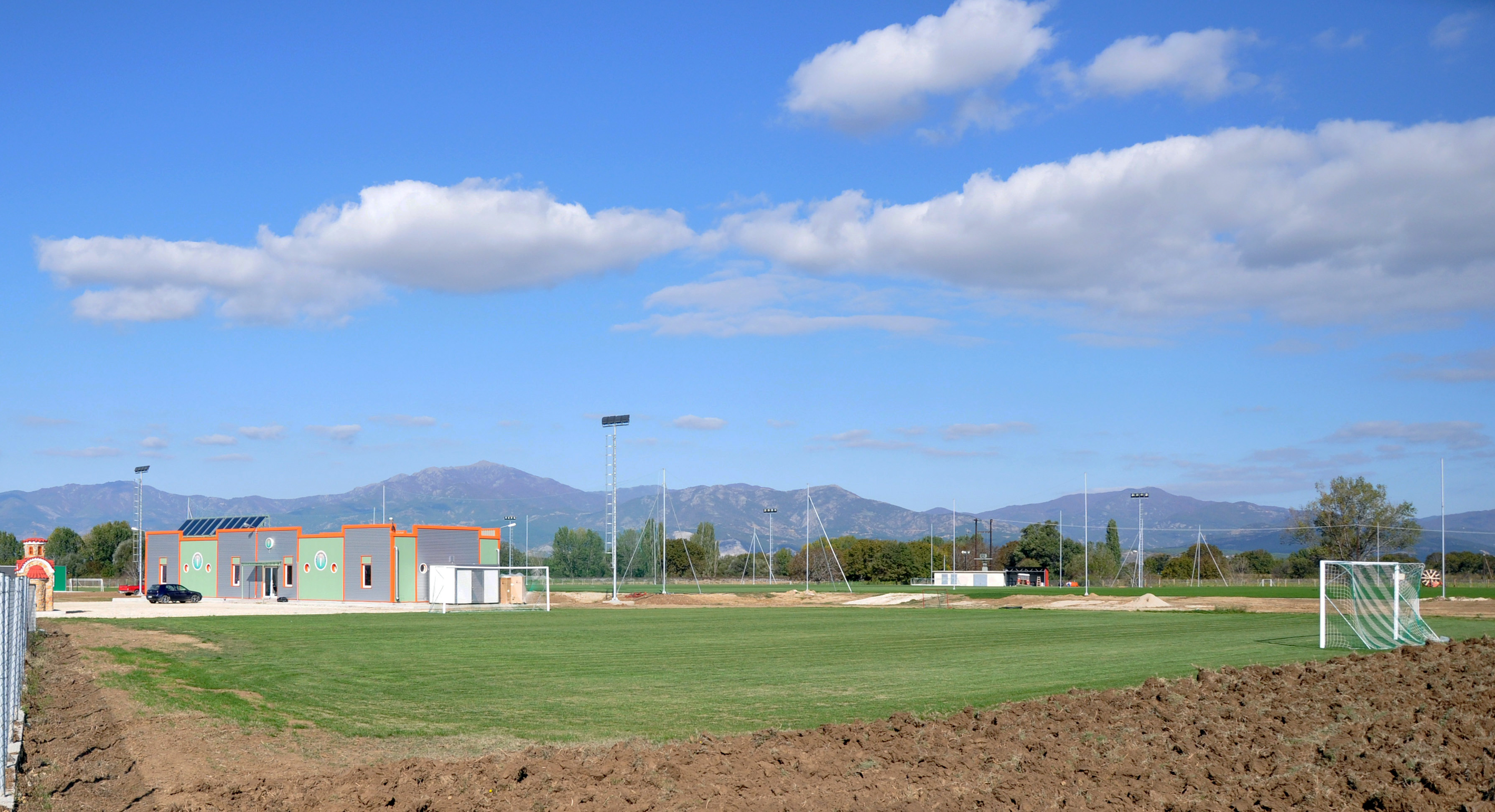
The sports center of Panthrakikos

There is an impressive array of sports facilities available. They include the Komotini Municipal Stadium (Home of Panthrakikos F.C.), Panthrakikos Stadium (training grounds), Municipal Sports Complex (NE of the city), Municipal Swimming pool and Basketball Arena, Democritus University Sports Complex including an Arena and an Aquatic Centre as well as basketball courts in almost every school in the city. The mountainous area in the north of the city is ideal for mountain-biking and trekking as well as 4x4 racing both of which take place throughout the year.

Sport clubs based in Komotini
Club	Founded	Sports	Achievements
AE Komotinis	1936	Football, Volleyball	Earlier presence in A1 Ethniki volleyball
Panthrakikos F.C.	1963	Football	Earlier presence in Alpha Ethniki
GAS Komotinis	1976	Basketball	Earlier presence in A2 Ethniki basketball

== Historical population ==
Year	Town population	Municipality population
1981	34,051	37,487
1991	37,036	39,927
2001	43,326	52,659
2011	50,990	66,919
2021	51,732	65,243

== Notable people ==
- Sadık Ahmet (Komotini 1947 - Komotini 1995), politician and advocate of Turkish minority rights
- Konstantinos Baniotis (b.1986), high jumper
- Archbishop Chrysanthus of Athens (Gratini 1881 - Athens 1949)
- Paschalis Draganidis (b.1992), footballer
- Frangoulis Frangos (b. Komotini 1951), general, chief of the Hellenic Army General Staff, former Minister for National Defence
- Apostolos Grozos (Komotini 1892 - Bucharest 1981), politician, leader of the Communist Party of Greece
- Akis Dagazian (b. Komotini 1975), international relations specialist, economist, businessman, diplomat, Chairman of the Hellenic - Armenian Chamber of Commerce and Industry of Greece (2017-), Consul ad Honorem of Armenia in Thessaloniki (2022-)
- Hamza Hamzaoğlu (b. Komotini 1970), Turkish footballer
- Hasan Hatipoğlu (Komotini 1923 - Komotini 2010), journalist, politician and advocate of Turkish minority rights
- Yanko Hristov (Komotini 1919 - Bulgaria 1994), Bulgarian partisan and diplomat
- Nikolaos Kaltsas (b. Dialambi near Iasmos in Rhodope), archaeologist, director of the National Archaeological Museum, Athens, member of the German Archaeological Institute
- Stilpon Kyriakidis (Komotini 1887 - Thessaloniki 1964), professor of history and folklore culture
- Petros Mantalos (b.1991), Greek footballer
- Ioannikios of Maroneia (d. 1838), cleric, fighter of the Greek War of Independence
- Nasuh Pasha (d. 1614), Grand Vizier of the Ottoman Empire
- George Petalotis (b. Komotini 1964), Greek politician
- Paul Soulikias (b. Komotini 1926 – Larissa 2023), Greek-Canadian painter
- Evripidis Stylianidis (b. Maroneia 1966), Greek politician, Minister of the Interior in 2012-13
- Sabiha Tansuğ (1933–2023), Turkish ethnologist

== See also ==
- Greek Muslim minority
- Turks of Western Thrace
- Pomaks
- Vergina Beer
- Beer in Greece

== Sources ==
- Kiel, M. (2004). "Gümüld̲j̲ine". The Encyclopedia of Islam, New Edition, Volume XII: Supplement. Leiden and New York: BRILL. pp. 329–331. ISBN 978-90-04-13974-9.
- Messinas, E. (2022). The Synagogues of Greece: A Study of Synagogues in Macedonia and Thrace: With Architectural Drawings of all Synagogues of Greece. Seattle: KDP. pp. 121–131 and 167-170. ISBN 979-8-8069-0288-8
- Μεσσίνας, Η. (2022). H Συναγωγή, Αθήνα: Εκδόσεις Ινφογνώμων. pp. 37–46. ISBN 978-618-5590-21-5
- Μεσσίνας, Η. (1999). Oι Συναγωγές στην Ελλάδα, η αρχιτεκτονική τους και η σχέση τους με τον ιστό της πόλης και την εβραϊκή συνοικία: Συγκριτική μελέτη της ιστορίας και αρχιτεκτονικής των συναγωγών της Βορείου Ελλάδος, η θέση τους στην εβραϊκή συνοικία και η παρουσία τους στον πολεοδομικό ιστό από τον 15ο στον 20ο αιώνα. Διδακτορική διατριβή στο Τμήμα Αρχιτεκτόνων Μηχανικών Τομέα Πολεοδομίας και Χωροταξίας του ΕΜΠ, pp. 217–238.
