= Clock tower of Komotini =

Clocktower in Komotini, Greece

Coordinates: 41°07′08″N 25°24′19″E

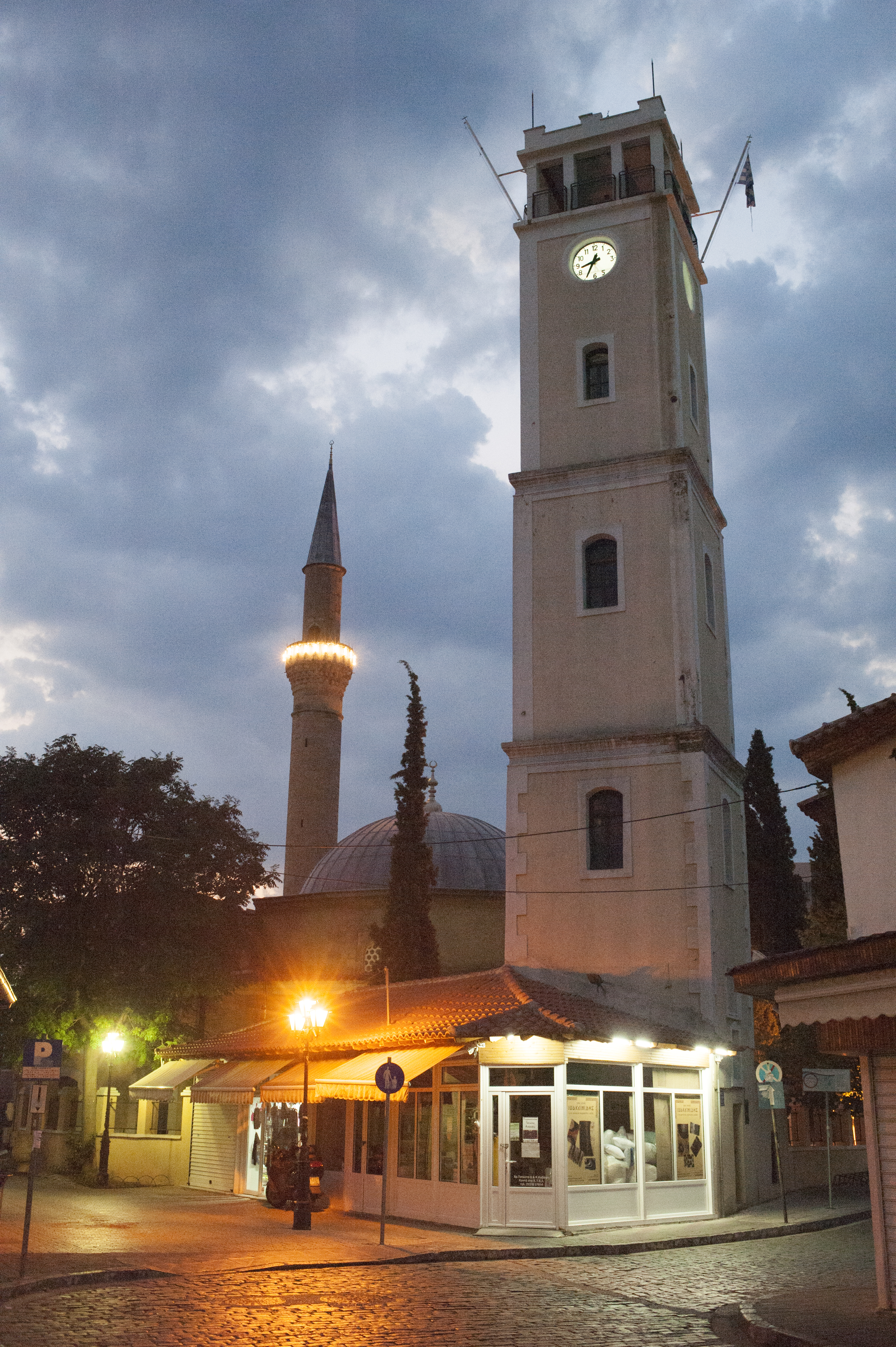
The Clocktower next to the Yeni Mosque, Komotini.

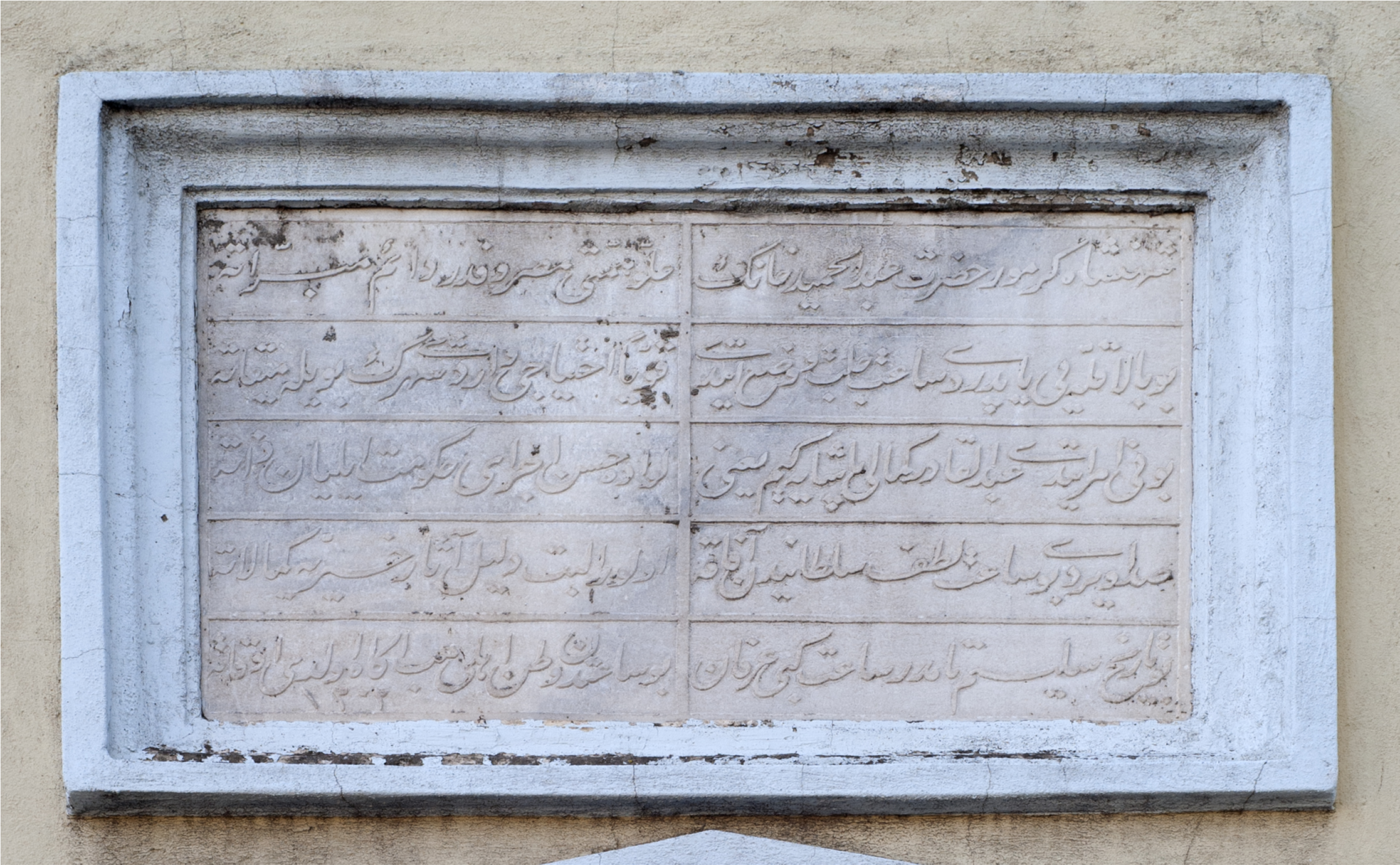
Ottoman inscription on the Clock Tower of Komotini.

The Clock Tower of Komotini (Greek: Πύργος του Ωρολογίου, Turkish: Saat Kule) is a clock tower of the Ottoman period built in the city center of Komotini, in the Western Thrace region of northern Greece, next to the town's Yeni Mosque. Dated to the nineteenth century, today it is located on Ermou Street.

== Description ==
This monument is considered a sample of the Ottoman modernization of 1884 and was erected as tribute to Sultan Abdul Hamit II. The tower is adjoined to the mausoleum of Fatma Hanım, the wife of vizier Hasan Pasha. The Clocktower includes both neoclassical and eclectical elements.

In the 1950s, several architectural interventions which resulted in the clocktower and the mosque taking their current shape and form. On the yard the religious authority of the Muslims of Rhodope (the muftia) of Komotini is housed.

== See also ==
- Ottoman Greece
- Hayriyye Madrasa
- Imaret of Komotini
- Clock tower of Xanthi
