= List of settlements in the Rhodope regional unit =

This is a list of settlements in the Rhodope regional unit, Greece:

- Aigeiros
- Amaxades
- Aratos
- Arisvi
- Arriana
- Fillyra
- Gratini
- Iasmos
- Imeros Rodopis
- Kalchas, Rhodope
- Kechros
- Kizari
- Komotini
- Maroneia
- Mesi, Rhodope
- Neo Sidirochori
- Organi
- Sapes
- Sostis

== See also ==
- List of municipalities and communities in Greece (1997–2010)
- List of municipalities of Greece (2011)
