= Asomatoi =

Asomatoi Ασώματοι
- Settlement
- Location within Greece
- Coordinates: 41°09′22.10″N 25°20′19.10″E
- Country: Greece
- Administrative region: East Macedonia and Thrace
- Regional unit: Rhodope
- Municipality: Iasmos
- Municipal unit: Sostis
- Elevation: 100 m (330 ft)

Population (2021)
  - Total: 601
- Time zone: UTC+2 (EET)
  - Summer (DST): UTC+3 (EEST)
- Postal code: 691 00
- Area code: +30 25310
- Vehicle registration: KO

Asomatoi (Greek: Ασώματοι) is a village in the Rhodope regional unit, East Macedonia and Thrace, Greece. Since the 2011 local government reform it is part of the municipality Iasmos. The population was 601 in 2021.

It has a mixed Christian and Muslim population. The trade unionist and politician Kostas Lazaridis was born here.
