= Aratos =

Aratos Άρατος
- Community
- Location within Greece
- Coordinates: 41°04′51″N 25°33′13″E
- Country: Greece
- Administrative region: Eastern Macedonia and Thrace
- Regional unit: Rhodope
- Municipality: Arriana
- Municipal unit: Fillyra

Population (2021)
  - Community: 906
- Time zone: UTC+2 (EET)
  - Summer (DST): UTC+3 (EEST)

Aratos (Greek: Άρατος, Turkish: Karacaoğlan) is a settlement in the Arriana municipality, Rhodope regional unit, Eastern Macedonia and Thrace region, Greece.

== See also ==
- List of settlements in the Rhodope regional unit
