= Strofi =

Strofi (Greek: Στροφή) may refer to:

- Strofi (literature), a work of Greek author Giorgos Seferis
- Strofi, Rhodope, a village in the eastern part of the Rhodope regional unit, Greece
