= Georgios Gevidis =

Revolutionary of the Greek War of Independence

Georgios Gevidis (Greek: Γεώργιος Γεβίδης) was a fighter of the Greek Revolution of 1821 and a member of the Filiki Etaireia from Thrace.

== Biography ==
He was born in Maroneia, then part of the Ottoman Empire. He practiced trade. In 1819, while he was in Constantinople for business, he was initiated into the Filiki Etaireia by Panagiotis Michanidis, offering 100 grosia. Ηe therefore fought in the Greek Revolution of 1821.

== Sources ==
- Eidisis.gr The news Portal of Kilkis, Konstantinos Pinelis, "Participation of Thracians in the Fikili Etaireia and in the revolution of 1821", 31 January 2012
- Festive Event in the Rotary of Komitini, The unknown contribution of Thrace to the liberation struggle, newspaper Chronos, 24 March 2009,"Excerpt: We don't know how the struggle in the Peloponnese and in Central Greece would have turned out had it not been for the Thracian and Ypsilantis' movements, [...] said Karyofyllis Antonakakis" (in Greek)
