= Sapes =

Town in Western Thrace, Greece

Sapes Σάπες
- Municipal unit
- Location within the regional unit

- Location within Greece
- Coordinates: 41°02′N 25°42′E
- Country: Greece
- Administrative region: East Macedonia and Thrace
- Regional unit: Rhodope
- Municipality: Maroneia-Sapes

Area
  - Municipal unit: 354.6 km^{2} (136.9 sq mi)

Population (2021)
  - Municipal unit: 6,738
  - Municipal unit density: 19.00/km^{2} (49.21/sq mi)
  - Community: 3,948
- Time zone: UTC+2 (EET)
  - Summer (DST): UTC+3 (EEST)
- Vehicle registration: ΚΟ

Sapes (Greek: Σάπες or Turkish: Şapçı) is a town and a former municipality in the Rhodope regional unit, East Macedonia and Thrace, Greece. Since the 2011 local government reform it is part of the municipality Maroneia-Sapes, of which it is the seat and a municipal unit. The municipal unit has an area of 354.596 km^{2}. The population is 6,738 (2021).

== Province ==
The province of Sapes (Greek: Επαρχία Σαπών) was one of the provinces of the Rhodope Prefecture. Its territory corresponded with that of the current municipal unit Sapes and the municipality Arriana, except the municipal unit Organi. It was abolished in 2006.
