= Imeros =

Imeros Ίμερος
- Community
- Location within Greece
- Coordinates: 40°57′28″N 25°22′13″E
- Country: Greece
- Administrative region: East Macedonia and Thrace
- Regional unit: Rhodope
- Municipality: Maroneia-Sapes
- Municipal unit: Maroneia

Population (2021)
  - Community: 213
- Time zone: UTC+2 (EET)
  - Summer (DST): UTC+3 (EEST)

Imeros is a small village in the northeastern part of Greece (Thrace). Imeros is located 1.5 km from the coastline of Thracian Sea. It belongs to the municipality of Maroneia-Sapes since 2011. Its population is 213 (2021 census). During the summer, it attracts many tourists visiting its beautiful crystal clear beach, which is 1.5 km from the center square of Imeros. The people of Imeros are refugees from Thrace and Asia Minor who originally settled in the area in 1922. The population exchanges between Greece and Turkey. One of the main features of the village is an organization named the Environmental Information/Educational Centre. The main jobs in Imeros are farming, fishing, and trading.

== History ==
When Imeros first became a village, it was situated 500m west of its current location. After a small period of time, the village was relocated to its current location. The name Imeros is derived from the Turkish word imaret, which means "nursing home". The village is named Imeros because supposedly, before returning to Turkey, a Turkish governor was embraced by the hospitality and care that the people there gave him. Some years later the name was transformed into Imeros, a Greek mythological god.

== Role ==
Imeros is an important geographical place, as it bonds the two regional units Xanthi and Evros. There is a coastal road that crosses through Imeros and during the summertime many vehicles pass through. Also, a National Observatory of Athens weather forecast station exists in Imeros.

== Agia Marina church ==
The Agia Marina Church is situated 500m west of the village in the directions of the Lissos River. The church was built on 2 acres of land and includes a huge outdoor yard. The first Agia Marina Church was built in 1922 when the first settlers of Imeros arrived. A new church was built in the early 1980s and was finished in 1988. A holy picture of Santa Marina (Agia Marina) that was brought with the original settlers is located in the old church. It is under guard at all times. In 2003, the religious organization of Agia Marina of Imeros was established. With the establishment of this organization came a large number of renovations to the church. The fence around the church was replaced, outdoor lighting was installed, a Byzantine holy icon painting was added. On the grounds of the churchyard there exists a guesthouse, used in the summer for church events. The foundation of the guesthouse is in good condition thanks to the help of volunteers, which have also up kept the inside and outside of the church. Every year on July 16, the church hold festive events that bring many people to the area.

== Imeros beach and port ==
Imeros Beach, located 1.5 km south of the village, is a main attraction in Imeros. There is 2 km of shoreline with crystal clear waters and a beautiful sandy beach. It is the nearest beach from Komotini, the capital of Rhodope unit. Imeros Beach is also the most popular beach after Fanari beach. A cultural association of young people from Imeros was established in 2012. Their goal was to develop and enhance the coastal area as well as the main attractions in the village. A small port is located some meters from the beach, where small fishing boats are typically anchored.

== Environmental-natural centre ==
The Environmental-Natural Centre is located in the old primary school of Imeros. The ENC is visited by all ages of children and adults. The goal of the Environmental-Natural Centre is to educate and inform others about the flora and fauna of the area. This is especially pertinent because there are several water lands nearby. The ENC has been working on the local water lands since 2003. Apart from the environmental aspect, the Environmental-Natural Centre plans other events in the Mikros Diakosmos, a cultural place located on Imeros Beach. During July and August, theatrical plays take place which are visited by area schools. Orchestras have also performed there.

== Waterlands complex ==
The surrounding area of Imeros is characterized by several wetlands varying in size. The wetlands have an important ecological role by providing home and food to waterbirds. Many bicycle tourists visit and take photos and footage each year of the wetlands of Imeros.
