= Papikio =

Mountain in Rhodope, Greece

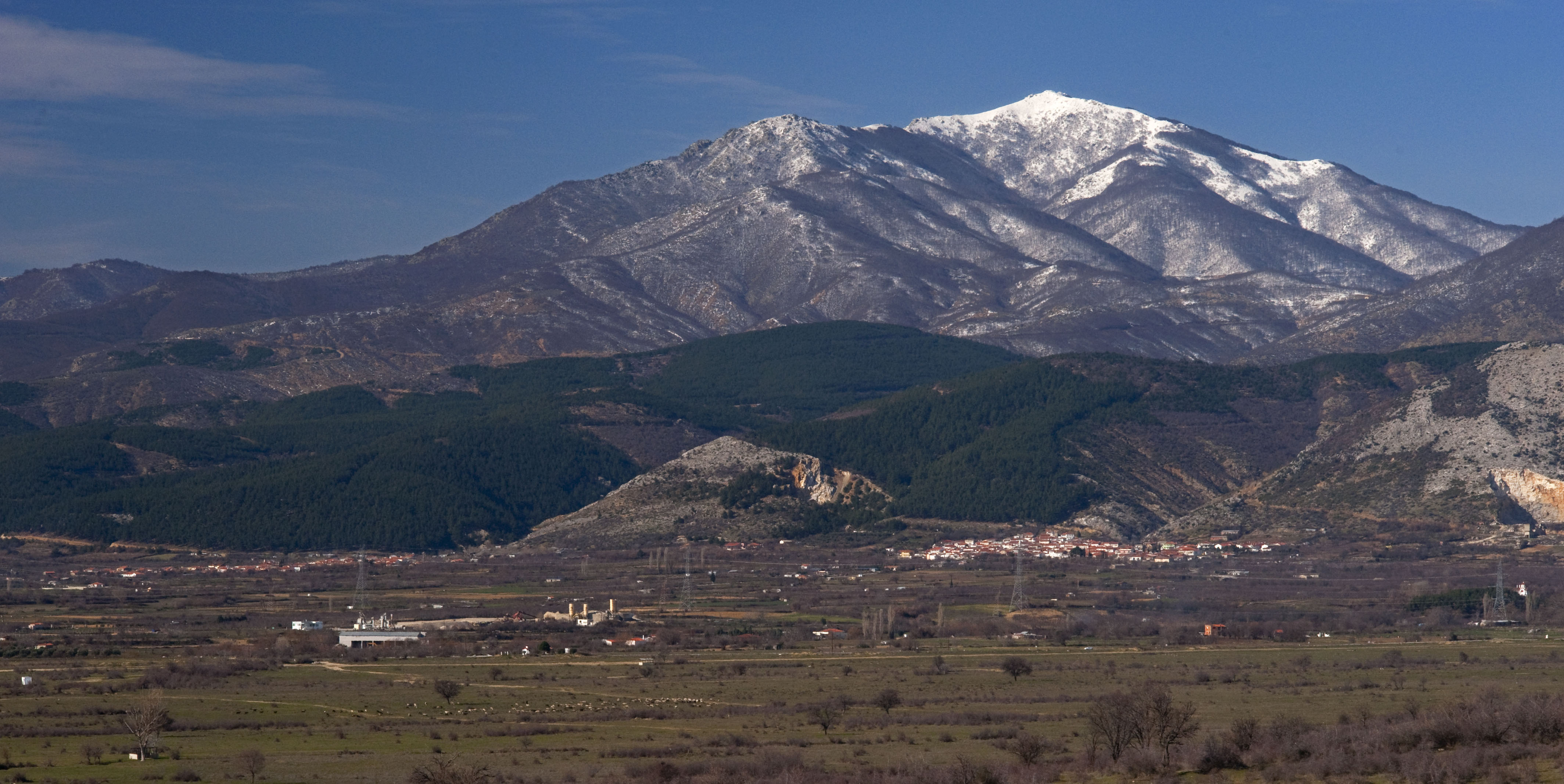

Highest point
- Elevation: 1,483 m (4,865 ft)
- Coordinates: 41.2195841°N 25.3068607°E

Geography
- Location within Greece
- Location: Rhodope
- Country: Greece

Papikio (Greek: Παπίκιο) is a mountain in Rhodope, Greece. Christian ascetics and monks lived on the mountain during the Byzantine period. Today, Byzantine monastery ruins can be found on the mountain.

In Bulgarian, Papikio is known as Orlitsa (Bulgarian: Орлица). In Turkish, it is known as Kartal Dağı. It is the highest point of the Eastern Rhodopes as well as the highest summit of the Komotini Ridge (Bulgarian: Гюмюрджински снежник, romanized: Gyumyurdzhinski Snezhnik), which is shared by Bulgaria and Greece. The southernmost point of Bulgaria, Veykata (1463 m; Bulgarian: Вейката) is located a few kilometres to the north of Papikio.
