= Kostas Lazaridis =

Greek trade unionist (1900–1943)

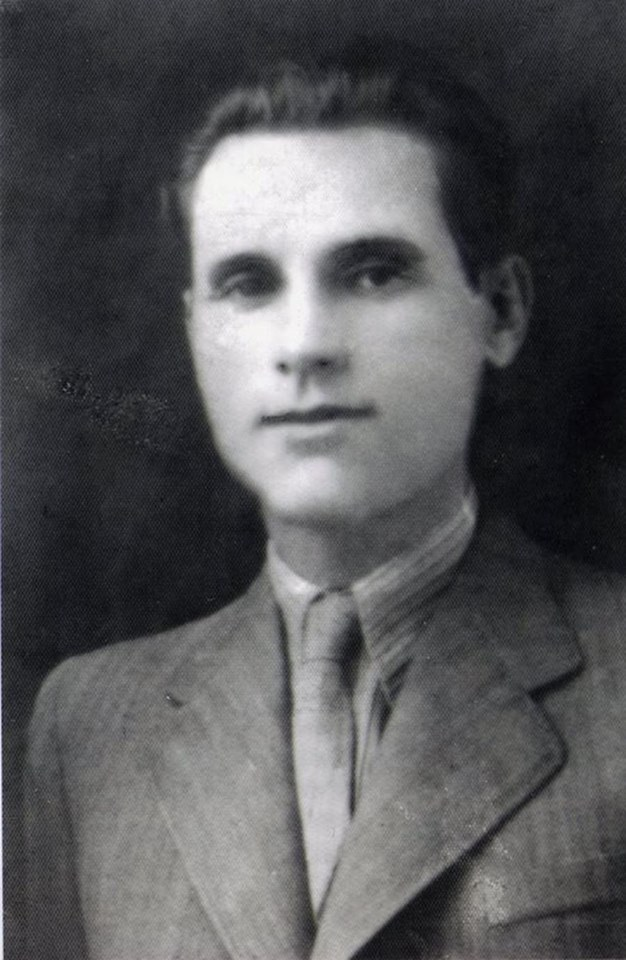
- Born: 1900; Asomatoi, Ottoman Empire
- Died: 1943 (aged 42–43); Kaisariani, Greece
- Political party: Communist Party of Greece

Kostas Lazaridis (1900–1943) was a Greek trade unionist and communist politician. He was a member of Central Committee of Communist Party of Greece. Lazaridis was also the General Secretary of the National Workers' Liberation Front (Εθνικό Εργατικό Απελευθερωτικό Μέτωπο, ΕΕΑΜ) which constituted the worker's section of National Liberation Front.

== Early years ==
He was born in 1900 in Asomatoi, which was then part of the Ottoman Empire. From his youth he became a communist member and took part in several Greek elections. In 1936, Ioannis Metaxas' 4th of August Regime outlawed the Greek Communist Party. In 1937 he was arrested and imprisoned in Acronauplia. When Greece was occupied by the Axis powers in 1941 Lazaridis was turned over to the occupiers, alongside other political prisoners. While in prison he learned some words from a Slavic dialect. With the permission of Giannis Ioannides (2nd in KKE ranks), he falsely declared himself to be of Bulgarian ethnicity in order to be released and resume working for the Greek Communist Party.

== Axis Occupation ==
He was the secretary of the Workers Committee and also a high-ranked member of KKE. For his activity was shot by Nazis in 1943.

== Family ==
His wife was sentenced to death by Bulgarian occupation army for her activities. He had a daughter and son, well known from the case Nikos Beloyannis.
