= Kechros =

Kechros Κέχρος
- Municipal unit
- Location within the regional unit

- Location within Greece
- Coordinates: 41°14′N 25°51′E
- Country: Greece
- Administrative region: East Macedonia and Thrace
- Regional unit: Rhodope
- Municipality: Arriana

Area
  - Municipal unit: 140.6 km^{2} (54.3 sq mi)
- Elevation: 651 m (2,136 ft)

Population (2021)
  - Municipal unit: 1,019
  - Municipal unit density: 7.248/km^{2} (18.77/sq mi)
- Time zone: UTC+2 (EET)
  - Summer (DST): UTC+3 (EEST)
- Vehicle registration: ΚΟ

Kechros (Greek: Κέχρος; Bulgarian: Мерикос, romanized: Merikos) is a village and a former community in the Rhodope regional unit, East Macedonia and Thrace, Greece. Since the 2011 local government reform it is part of the municipality Arriana, of which it is a municipal unit. The municipal unit has an area of 140.617 km^{2}. It has a population of 1,019, as of 2021.

== Election results ==
Election	Turnout	ND	PASOK	SYRIZA	KKE	Other
Jun 2023	41.11	11.76	50.90	33.12	0.38	3.84 (Note: Μ25 1.15 Other 2.69)
May 2023	49.67	10.02	45.42	41.79	0.53	2.24
2019	49.57	25.63	62.29	9.77	0.95	1.36
Sep 2015	46.79	13.39	4.02	34.19	0.62	47.78 (Note: Potami 44.49 Other 3.29)
Jan 2015	50.23	6.02	3.52	62.74	0.28	27.44 (Note: Potami 22.61 KIDISO 3.99 Other 0.84)
Jun 2012	50.95	5.59	30.87	26.31	0.43	36.80 (Note: DIMAR 34.91 Other 1.89)
May 2012	51.83	10.32	39.86	6.46	2.15	41.21 (Note: DISY 32.94 DIMAR 4.40 Other 3.87)
2009	62.48	34.66	60.38	2.76	1.13	1.07
2007	63.10	44.28	54.01	0.48	0.34	0.89
2004	65.56	50.49	47.66	0.79	0.40	0.66
2000	78.97	33.86	57.02	5.54 (Note: as Syn)	0.69	2.89 (Note: DIKKI 1.01 Other 1.88)
1996	79.41	22.18	65.84	8.05	0.82	3.11
1993	80.59	17.89	7.14	0.26	0.19	74.52 (Note: KIEF 73.29 Other 1.23)
1990	79.00	8.61	10.35	0.51		80.53 (Note: KIEF 79.52 Other 1.01)
Nov 1989	76.80	23.37	13.65	0.43		62.55 (Note: KIEF 61.54 Other 1.01)
Jun 1989	77.25	19.87	40.92	1.41		37.80 (Note: KIEF 33.95 DIANA 2.22 Other 1.63)
1985	80.72	48.22	20.63	0.31 (Note: as KKE-Es)	0.62	30.22 (Note: KIEF 28.44 Other 1.78)
1981	81.87	92.90	5.26	0.09	0.65	1.10
1977	79.60	14.26	2.67	0.59 (Note: as Symmachia)	1.29	81.19 (Note: EDIK 45.25 EP 35.94)
1974	90.27	34.66	0.18	0.09		65.07 (Note: EK–ND 61.98 EDE 3.09)
