= Amaxades =

Amaxades Αμαξάδες
- Municipal unit
- Location within the regional unit

- Location within Greece
- Coordinates: 41°07′N 25°04′E
- Country: Greece
- Administrative region: East Macedonia and Thrace
- Regional unit: Rhodope
- Municipality: Iasmos

Area
  - Municipal unit: 34.3 km^{2} (13.2 sq mi)
- Elevation: 52 m (171 ft)

Population (2021)
  - Municipal unit: 1,752
  - Municipal unit density: 51.1/km^{2} (132/sq mi)
- Time zone: UTC+2 (EET)
  - Summer (DST): UTC+3 (EEST)
- Vehicle registration: ΚΟ

Amaxades (Greek: Αμαξάδες, Bulgarian: Арабаджи, Turkish: Arabacıköy) is a village and a former community in the Rhodope regional unit, East Macedonia and Thrace, Greece. Since the 2011 local government reform it is part of the municipality Iasmos, of which it is a municipal unit. The municipal unit has an area of 34.300 km^{2}. The population is 1,752 (2021). South of the village are the remains of the Byzantine-era town Anastasiopolis-Peritheorion.
