= Cizari =

Settlement and fort of ancient Pontus

Coordinates: 40°53′58″N 35°52′30″E

Cizari or Kizari (Ancient Greek: ἡ Κίζαρι), also called Icizari or Ikizari (Ἰκίζαρι), was a settlement and fort of ancient Pontus, in the district Phazemonitis, on Lake Stiphane. It was deserted in Strabo's time, and there was a palace built near it.

Its site is located southwest of Lâdik, Asiatic Turkey.
