= Panagiotis Michanidis =

Leader, fighter

Panagiotis Michanidis (Greek: Παναγιώτης Μηχανίδης) was a leader and fighter of the Greek Revolution of 1821 from Maroneia, Thrace.

== Biography ==
Panagiotis Michanidis was from Maroneia.

Before the revolution, he was a member of the Filiki Etaireia, and had the rank of Apostle. He vigorously spread the idea of the Revolution and publicised the events in Kalamata.

As a military man, he followed Mavromichalis. When he left Kalamata, Michanidis continued his work of transmitting the news. This, along with his way of writing it, acted as a morale boost for the revolutionaries.

== Sources ==
- Fotios Chrysanthopoulos, ed. (1888). Lives of Peloponnesian men, and of the clerics, military men and politicians who came to the Peloponnese, who fought in the revolutionary struggle (in Greek). Athens: Stavros Andropoulos, Print shop P. D. Sakellariou.
