= Gratini =

Gratini Γρατινή
- Community
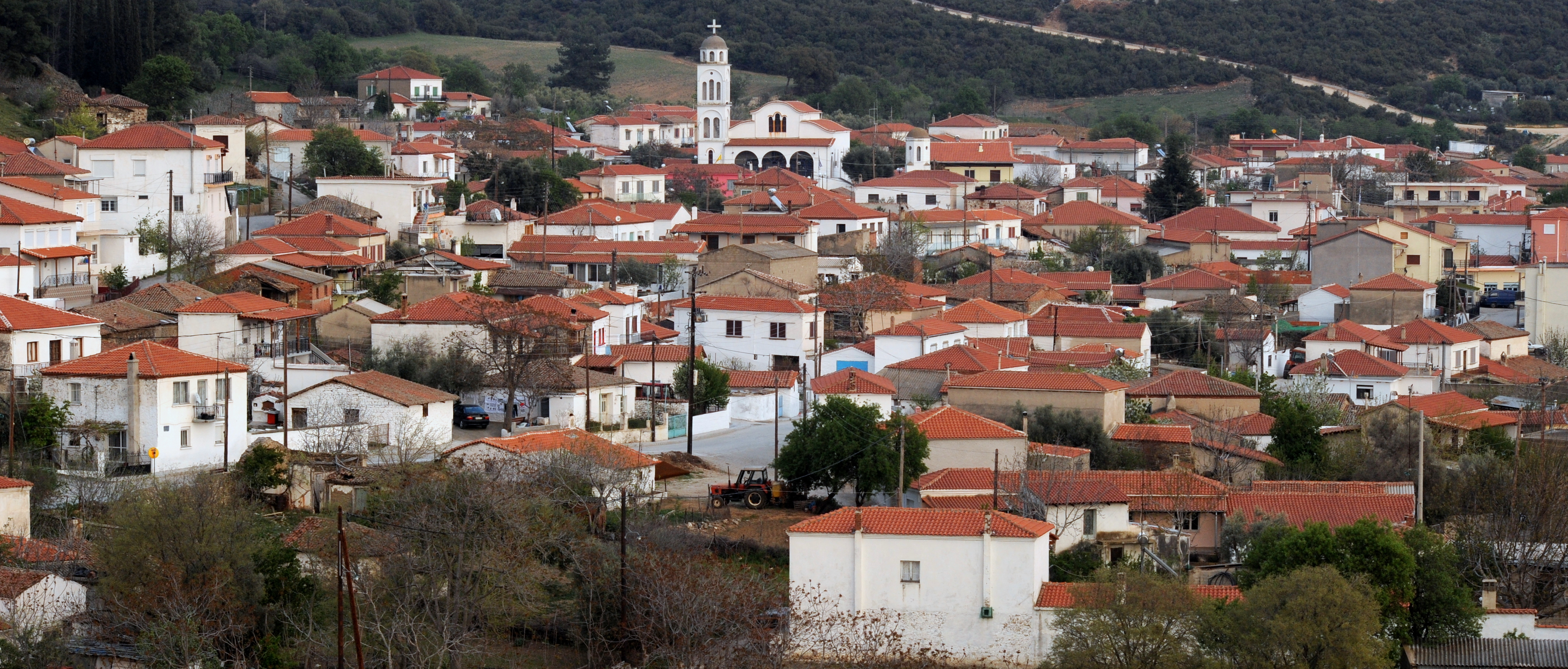

- Location within Greece
- Coordinates: 41°09′N 25°32′E
- Country: Greece
- Administrative region: Eastern Macedonia and Thrace
- Regional unit: Rhodope
- Municipality: Komotini
- Municipal unit: Komotini

Population (2021)
  - Community: 271
- Time zone: UTC+2 (EET)
  - Summer (DST): UTC+3 (EEST)

Gratini (Greek: Γρατινή) is a village of Rhodope regional unit in northern Greece, 13 km north of Komotini. It is part of the municipal unit of Komotini.

== History ==
The village first appears in the late Byzantine era, as the town of Gratzianous (η Γρατζιανούς), while Ottoman documents mention it as Iğrican and Ağricanhišar. The late medieval village may possibly be identical to the ancient city of Gratianopolis, named after Emperor Gratian (r. 367–383), whose bishop is recorded as taking part in the First Council of Ephesus in 431.

The town played a prominent role in the Byzantine civil wars of the mid-14th century. In 1344, during the war of 1341–1347, the well-fortified town was captured by John VI Kantakouzenos (r. 1341–1354), who appointed his son Matthew to rule over it and the surrounding province. Gratzianous remained the seat of Matthew and his family until 1355/56, when, after another civil war, he surrendered it and all his Thracian domains to John V Palaiologos (r. 1341–1391) in exchange for the Despotate of the Morea.

== Fortress ==
The ruins of the 14th-century fortress are preserved in a hill to the north of the modern village, near the river Patermos. The single wall is built using roughly hewn stone with mortar and brick fragments, as well as irregular brickwork. From north to south the fort has a span of over 250 feet, and features a tower on its eastern wall. Amidst the ruins of the fortress lies a more recent chapel dedicated to the Life-giving Spring (Zoodochos Pigi) next to which lies a large rectangular barrel vaulted cistern.

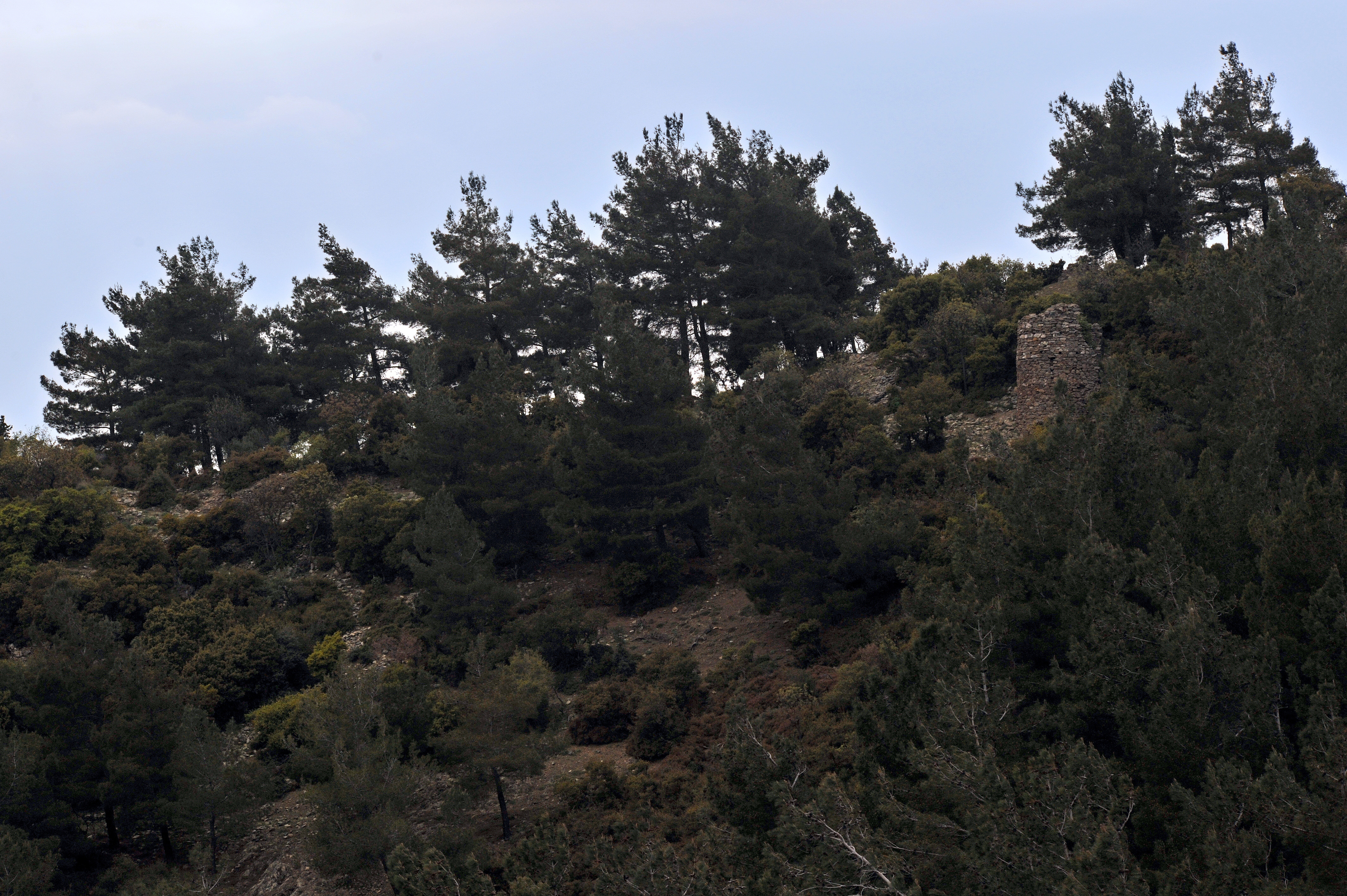
The fort of Gratini

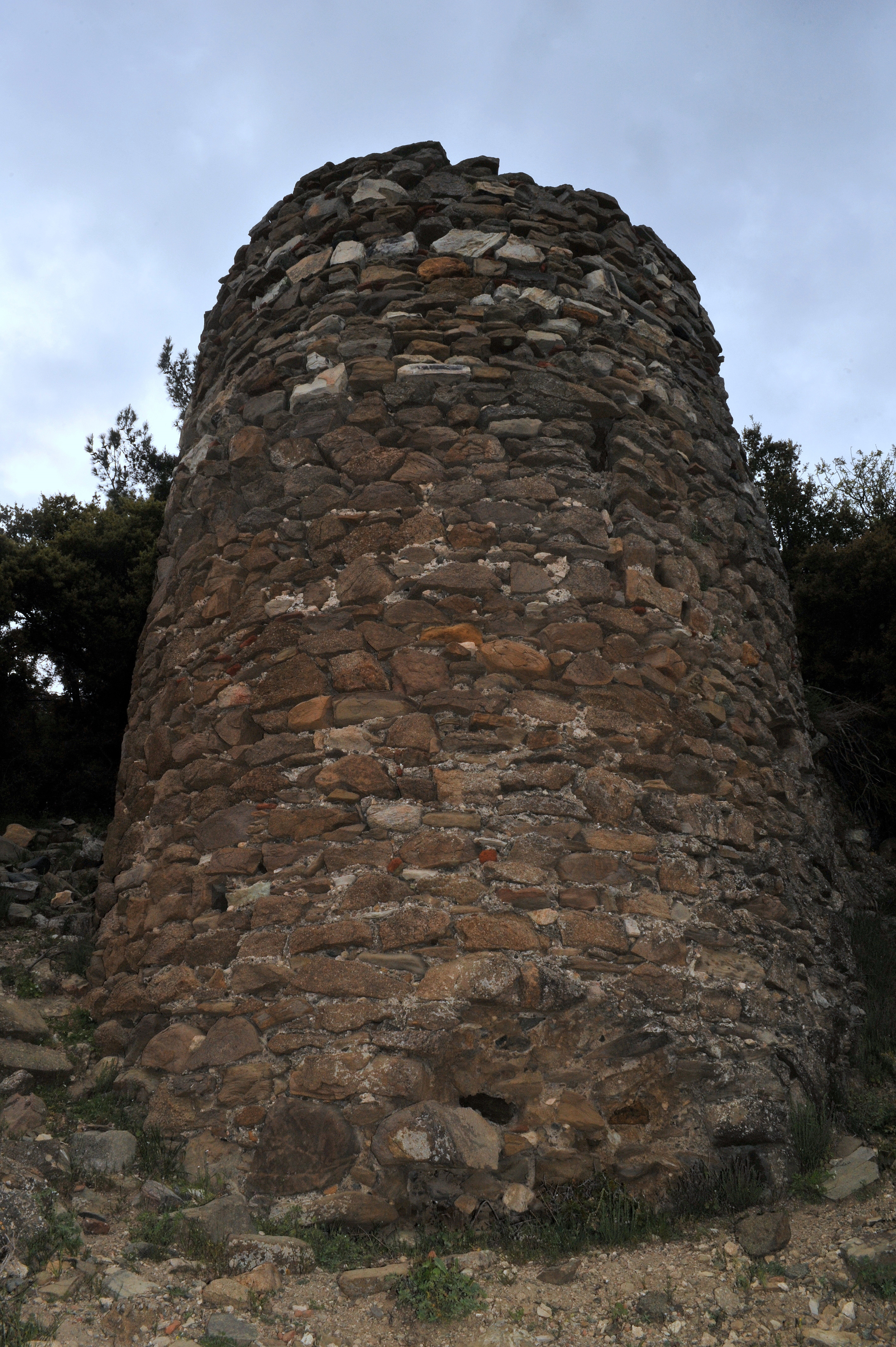
The eastern tower

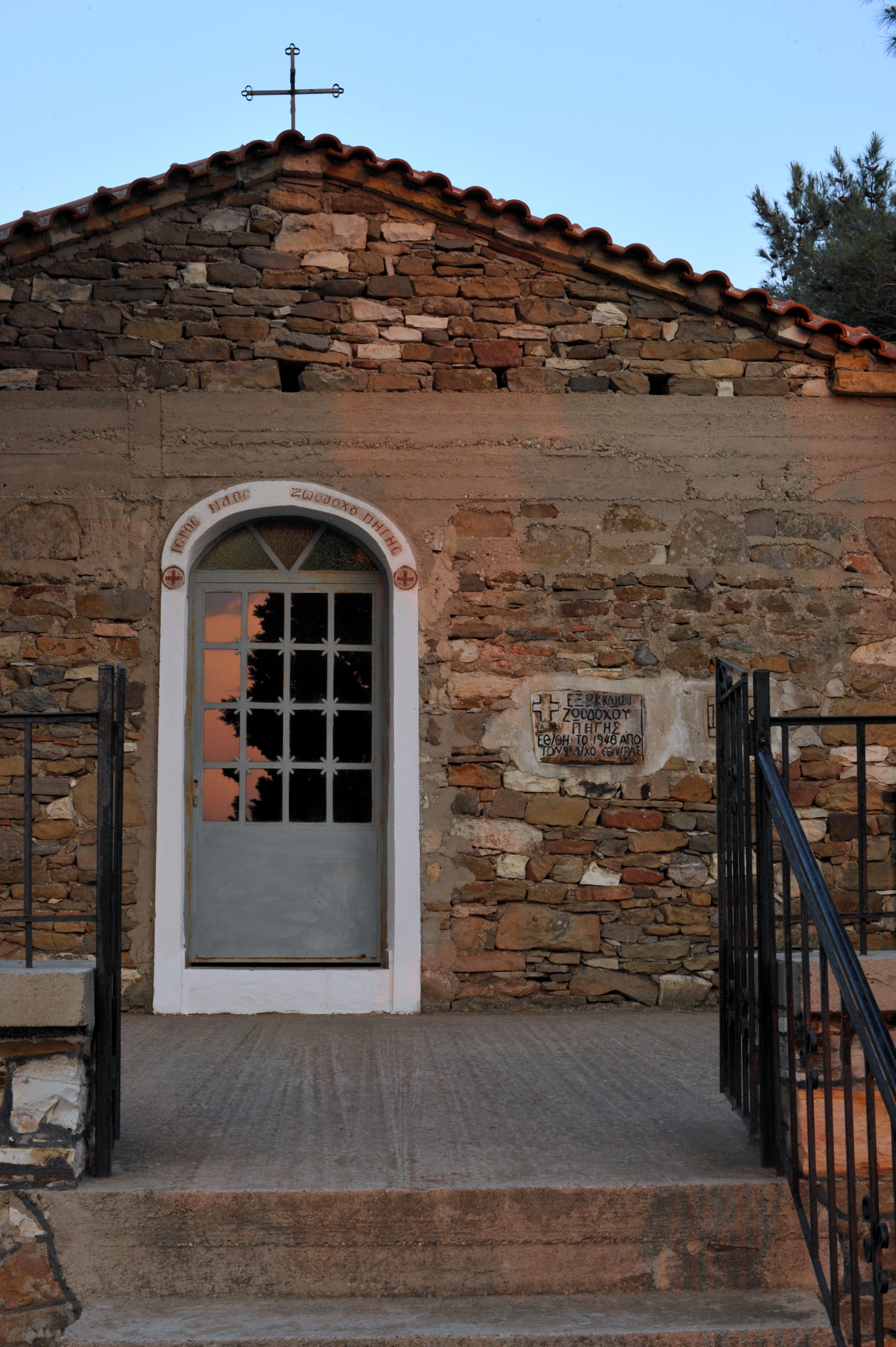
The chapel of the Life-giving Spring (Zoodochos Pigi)

== Dam ==
1.5 km northwest of the village lies the Gratini Dam. With a height of 45 m and a capacity of 18 million cubic meters, it serves the nearby power plant of the Public Power Corporation.

== People from Gratini ==
- Archbishop Chrysanthus of Athens (1881–1940).
