= Neo Sidirochori =

Neo Sidirochori Νέο Σιδηροχώρι
- Municipal unit
- Location within the regional unit

- Location within Greece
- Coordinates: 41°01′N 25°21′E
- Country: Greece
- Administrative region: East Macedonia and Thrace
- Regional unit: Rhodope
- Municipality: Komotini

Area
  - Municipal unit: 120.5 km^{2} (46.5 sq mi)

Population (2021)
  - Municipal unit: 2,213
  - Municipal unit density: 18.37/km^{2} (47.57/sq mi)
  - Community: 1,070
- Time zone: UTC+2 (EET)
  - Summer (DST): UTC+3 (EEST)
- Vehicle registration: ΚΟ

Neo Sidirochori (Greek: Νέο Σιδηροχώρι), is a village and a former municipality in the Rhodope regional unit, East Macedonia and Thrace, Greece. Since the 2011 local government reform it is part of the municipality Komotini, of which it is a municipal unit. The municipal unit has an area of 120.488 km^{2}. Population 2,213 (2021). The majority of the residents of the village descend from originally Greek refugees who had to flee from the village of Samakovo in Eastern Thrace after the Greek defeat in the Greco-Turkish War.
