= Maroneia-Sapes =

Maroneia-Sapes Μαρώνεια-Σάπες
- Municipality

- Location within Greece
- Coordinates: 41°02′N 25°42′E
- Country: Greece
- Administrative region: Eastern Macedonia and Thrace
- Regional unit: Rhodope

Government
  - Mayor: Apostolos Ioannou (since 2023)

Area
  - Municipality: 641.8 km^{2} (247.8 sq mi)

Population (2021)
  - Municipality: 11,867
  - Density: 18.49/km^{2} (47.89/sq mi)
- Time zone: UTC+2 (EET)
  - Summer (DST): UTC+3 (EEST)
- Website: Official website

Maroneia-Sapes (Greek: Μαρώνεια-Σάπες) is a municipality in the Rhodope regional unit, East Macedonia and Thrace, Greece. The seat of the municipality is the town Sapes. The municipality has an area of 641.751 km^{2}.

== Municipality ==
The municipality Maroneia-Sapes was formed at the 2011 local government reform by the merger of the following 2 former municipalities, that became municipal units:

- Maroneia
- Sapes
