= Iasmos =

Iasmos Ίασμος
- Municipality
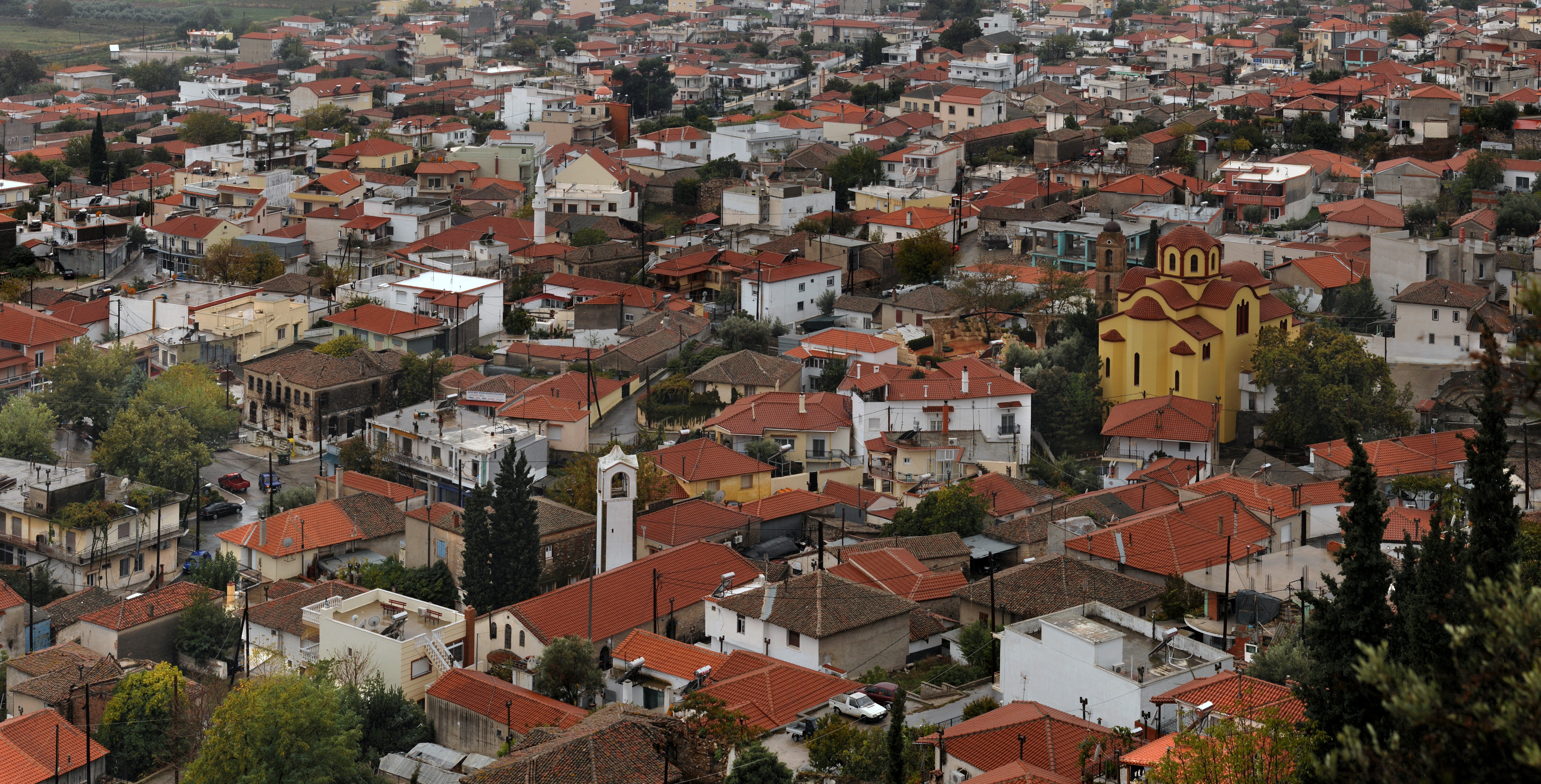

- Location within Greece
- Coordinates: 41°08′N 25°11′E
- Country: Greece
- Administrative region: East Macedonia and Thrace
- Regional unit: Rhodope

Area
  - Municipality: 485.3 km^{2} (187.4 sq mi)
  - Municipal unit: 221.8 km^{2} (85.6 sq mi)
- Elevation: 43 m (141 ft)

Population (2021)
  - Municipality: 12,247
  - Density: 25.24/km^{2} (65.36/sq mi)
  - Municipal unit: 4,974
  - Municipal unit density: 22.43/km^{2} (58.08/sq mi)
  - Community: 3,892
- Time zone: UTC+2 (EET)
  - Summer (DST): UTC+3 (EEST)
- Vehicle registration: ΚΟ

Iasmos (Greek: Ίασμος, romanized: Íasmos) is a municipality of the Rhodope regional unit, located in Eastern Macedonia and Thrace, Greece. Its administrative seat is the municipal unit (town) of Iasmos. As of 2021, it had a population of 12,247 people, with significant Sarakatsani and Muslim minority communities.

== Geography ==
The municipality has an area of 485.285 square kilometres (187.370 sq mi), while the municipal unit covers 221.795 square kilometres (85.636 sq mi). The area of the municipality before the 2011 local government reforms was 200,403 stremmas (200.403 kilometres (124.525 mi)), with roughly three-fifths classified as mountainous or semi-mountainous and the remaining two-fifths as lowland plains. The municipality can thus be split into two geographical zones: a lowland area of fertile plains in the south, which extends along the southern foothills of the Rhodope Mountains, and a forested mountainous region in the southern and southwestern parts of the municipality. Feral horses and goats can be found in the mountainous areas.

The municipality of Iasmos shares borders with the municipal unit of Satres in the Xanthi regional unit to the northwest, the country of Bulgaria to the northeast, the municipal unit of Amaxades to the west, the municipal units of Sostis and Aigeiros to the east, and Lake Vistonida to the southwest.

== Administration ==
The municipality of Iasmos was established through the merger of the former towns (communities) of Iasmos, Ambrosia, and Salpi. It originally comprised the following 11 settlements: Iasmos, Ambrosia, Palladio, Mikros Palladio, Salpi, Glykoneri, Dialampi, Kopteros, Mosaico, Galini, and Ippikos. The 2011 local government reforms in Greece resulted in another merger, this time of the Iasmos, Amaxades, and Sostis municipalities, which became newly designated municipal units. The resultant municipality retained the name Iasmos.

The town of Iasmos, the administrative seat of the municipality, is located along the Komotini–Xanthi provincial road, approximately 20 kilometres (12 mi) from Komotini and 28 kilometres (17 mi) km from Xanthi.

== Demographics ==
At the time of the 2001 census, the total population of the municipality was 6,774. The workforce was reported to be 5,600, with 89.3% (5,000 individuals) employed and 10.7% (600 individuals) unemployed. As of the 2021 census, the population was 12,247.

The municipality is home to a diverse number of cultural and religious groups. Multiple cultural and religious minorities coexist in the municipal units of Ambrosia, Salpi, Mosaico, and Iasmos. Meanwhile, Kopteros, Galini, Mikros Palladio, and Ippikos are predominantly inhabited by members of the Muslim minority. Dialampi, Palladio, and Glykoneri are mainly inhabited by Sarakatsani, a traditionally nomadic pastoralist subgroup of Greeks, who are primarily engaged in agriculture in the surrounding fertile plains.

== Economy ==
The primary economic activity in the municipality is agriculture, which employed approximately 75% of the workforce (about 4,200 individuals) in 2001. Major agricultural products include cotton, maize, sugar beets, tobacco, and tomatoes. Livestock farming, especially the breeding of sheep and goats, is also common, with some activity in buffalo breeding.

Economic development in Iasmos focuses on its strategic geographical position between the cities of Komotini and Xanthi, as well as its proximity to the A2 motorway (Egnatia Odos). The municipality is on major arteries to broader urban centers, including Alexandroupolis, Kavala, and Thessaloniki, and facilitates transportation to ports and airports in northern Greece.
