= Organi =

Organi Οργάνη
- Municipal unit
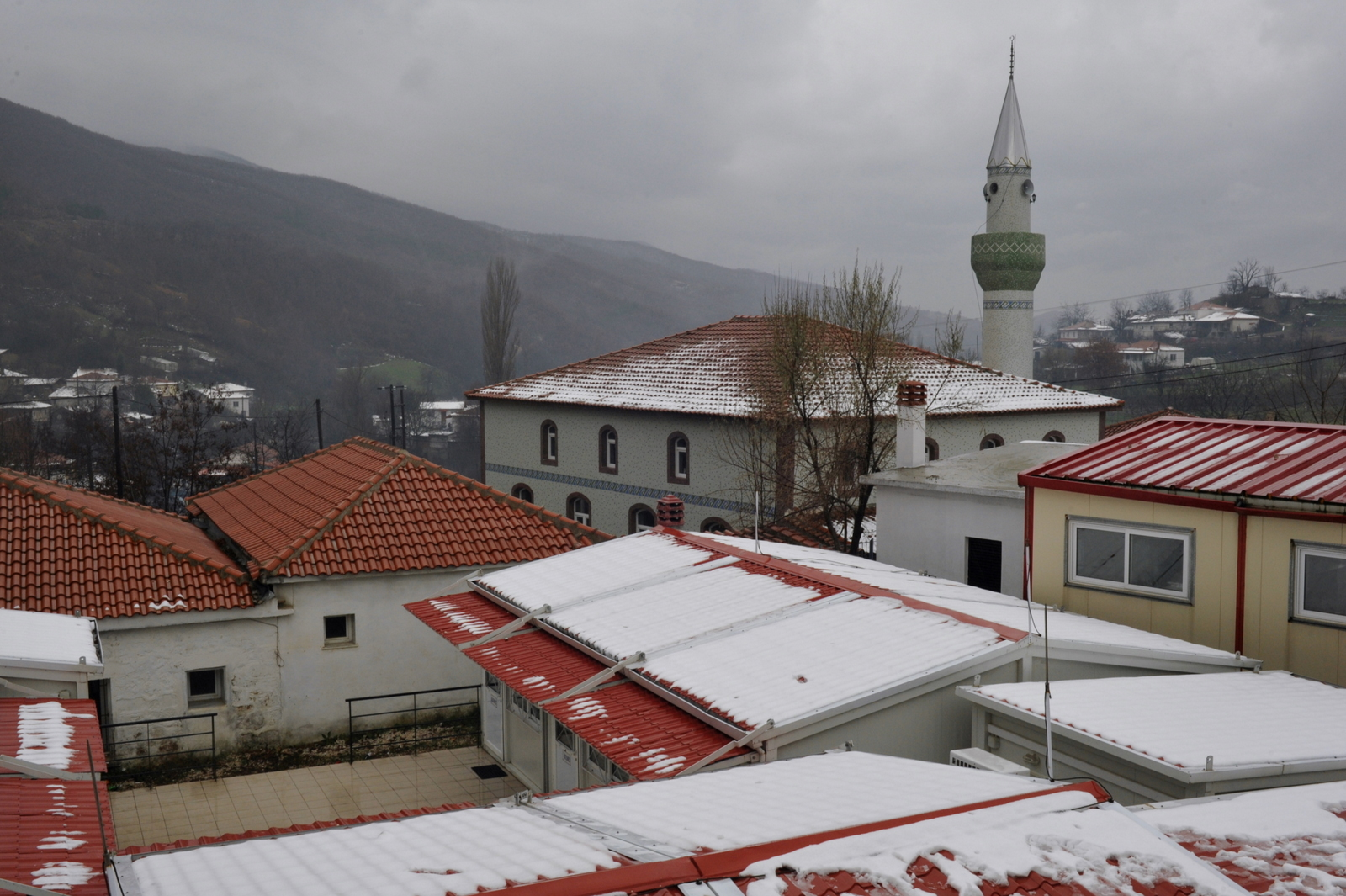

- Location within the regional unit

- Location within Greece
- Coordinates: 41°15′N 25°41′E
- Country: Greece
- Administrative region: East Macedonia and Thrace
- Regional unit: Rhodope
- Municipality: Arriana

Area
  - Municipal unit: 215.7 km^{2} (83.3 sq mi)
- Elevation: 409 m (1,342 ft)

Population (2021)
  - Municipal unit: 1,785
  - Municipal unit density: 8.275/km^{2} (21.43/sq mi)
- Time zone: UTC+2 (EET)
  - Summer (DST): UTC+3 (EEST)
- Vehicle registration: ΚΟ

Organi (Greek: Οργάνη) is a village and a former community in the Rhodope regional unit, East Macedonia and Thrace, Greece. Since the 2011 local government reform it is part of the municipality Arriana, of which it is a municipal unit. The municipal unit has an area of 215.665 km^{2}. Population 1,785 (2021).
