= Fillyra =

Fillyra Φιλλύρα
- Municipal unit
- Location within the regional unit

- Location within Greece
- Coordinates: 41°07′N 25°38′E
- Country: Greece
- Administrative region: East Macedonia and Thrace
- Regional unit: Rhodope
- Municipality: Arriana

Area
  - Municipal unit: 236.5 km^{2} (91.3 sq mi)

Population (2021)
  - Municipal unit: 6,813
  - Municipal unit density: 28.81/km^{2} (74.61/sq mi)
  - Community: 827
- Time zone: UTC+2 (EET)
  - Summer (DST): UTC+3 (EEST)
- Vehicle registration: ΚΟ

Fillyra (Greek: Φιλλύρα) is a village and a former municipality in the Rhodope regional unit, East Macedonia and Thrace, Greece. Since the 2011 local government reform it is part of the municipality Arriana, of which it is the seat and a municipal unit. The municipal unit has an area of 236.502 km^{2}. In 2021 its population was 6,813. The Turkish name of Fillyra is Sirkeli, meaning "with vinegar".
