= Aigeiros =

Aigeiros Αίγειρος
- Municipal unit
- Location within the regional unit

- Location within Greece
- Coordinates: 41°05′N 25°17′E
- Country: Greece
- Administrative region: East Macedonia and Thrace
- Regional unit: Rhodope
- Municipality: Komotini

Area
  - Municipal unit: 139.1 km^{2} (53.7 sq mi)

Population (2021)
  - Municipal unit: 2,870
  - Municipal unit density: 20.6/km^{2} (53.4/sq mi)
  - Community: 1,019
- Time zone: UTC+2 (EET)
  - Summer (DST): UTC+3 (EEST)
- Vehicle registration: ΚΟ

Aigeiros (Greek: Αίγειρος) is a village and a former municipality in the Rhodope regional unit, East Macedonia and Thrace, Greece. Since the 2011 local government reform it is part of the municipality Komotini, of which it is a municipal unit. The municipal unit has an area of 139.060 km^{2}. Current population 2,870 (2021 Census).
