= Maroneia =

Village in the East Macedonia and Thrace region of Greece

Maroneia Μαρώνεια
- Municipal unit
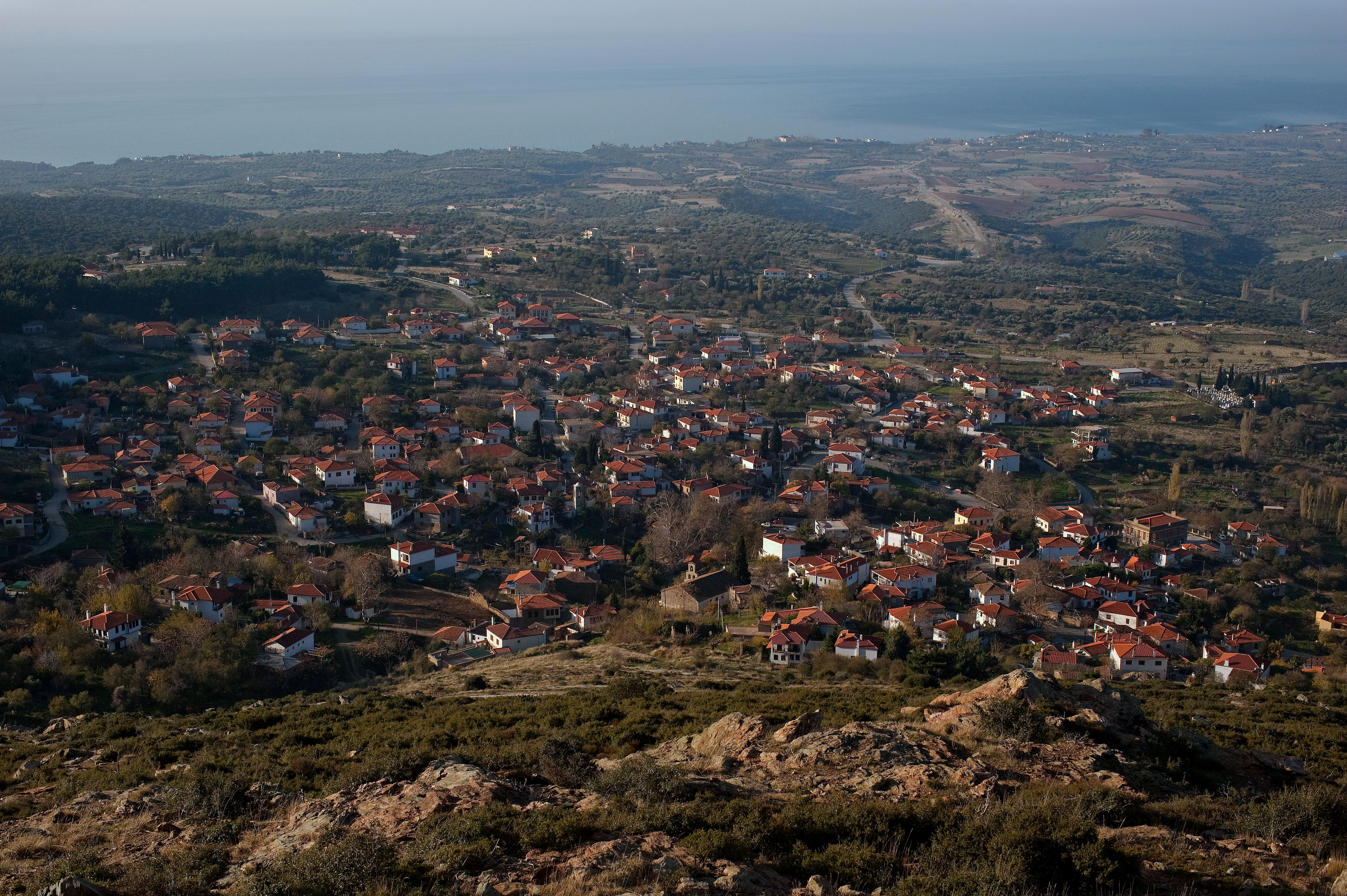

- Location within the regional unit

- Location within Greece
- Coordinates: 40°54′N 25°31′E
- Country: Greece
- Administrative region: East Macedonia and Thrace
- Regional unit: Rhodope
- Municipality: Maroneia-Sapes

Area
  - Municipal unit: 287.2 km^{2} (110.9 sq mi)

Population (2021)
  - Municipal unit: 5,129
  - Municipal unit density: 17.86/km^{2} (46.25/sq mi)
  - Community: 514
- Time zone: UTC+2 (EET)
  - Summer (DST): UTC+3 (EEST)
- Vehicle registration: ΚΟ

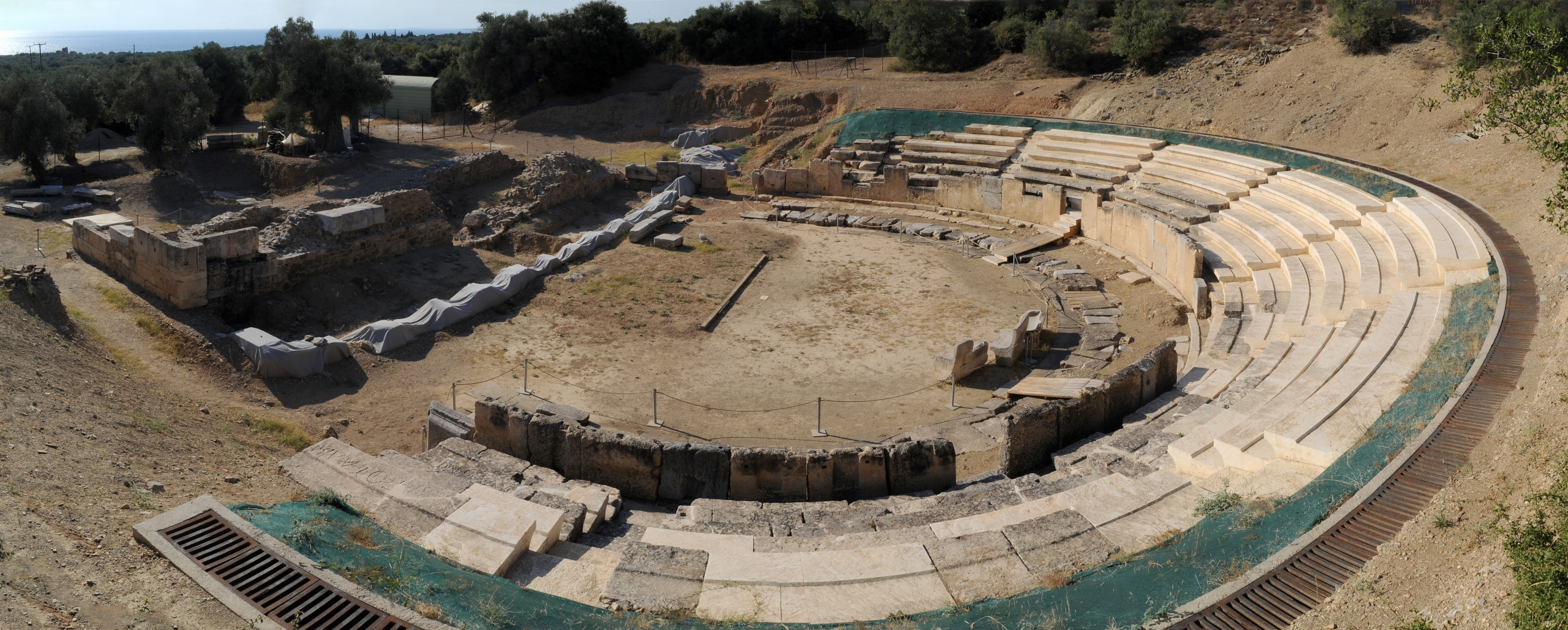
View of the ancient theatre

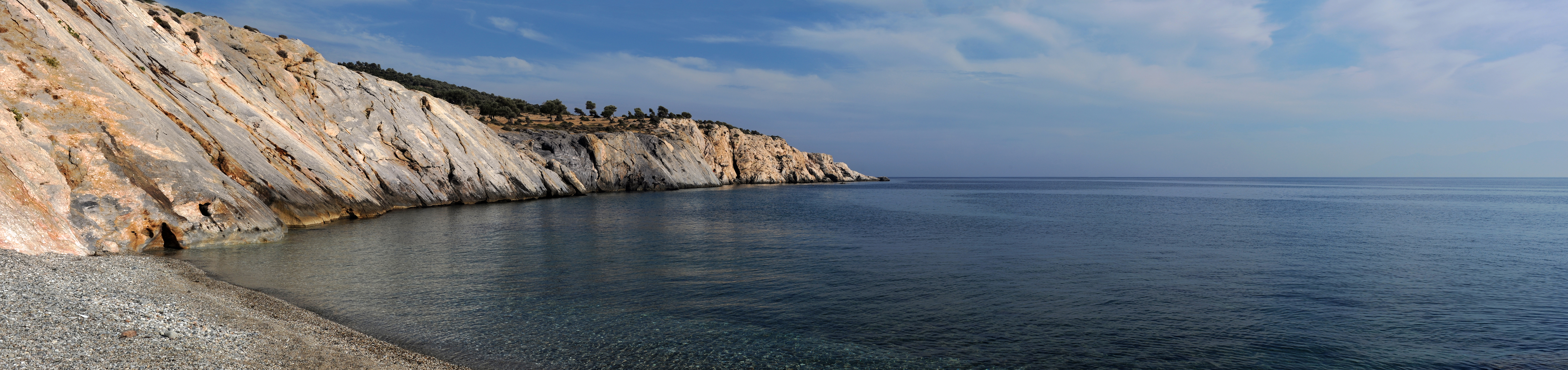
Marmaritsa beach, Maroneia

Maroneia (Greek: Μαρώνεια) is a village and a former municipality in Rhodope regional unit, East Macedonia and Thrace, Greece. Since the 2011 local government reform it is part of the municipality Maroneia-Sapes, of which it is a municipal unit. The municipal unit has an area of 287.155 km^{2}. Population 5,129 (2021). The seat of the municipality was in Xylagani.

== History ==
In legend, it was said to have been founded by Maron, a son of Dionysus, or even a companion of Osiris. According to Pseudo-Scymnus it was founded by Chios in the fourth year of the fifty-ninth Olympiad (540 BCE). According to Pliny, its ancient name was Ortagures or Ortagurea. It was located on the hill of Agios Charalampos, and archaeological findings date it as a much older and as a pure Thracian city. Herodotus says it belonged to the Cicones.

Maroneia was close to the Ismaros mentioned by Homer in the Odyssey. Some scholars identify Maroneia with his Ismaros. Homer has Odysseus plundering the city but sparing Maron, whom he identifies as a priest of Apollo. Maron presents Odysseus with a gift of wine, as well as with gold and silver.

In the era of Ancient Greece and Rome, Maroneia was famous for its wine production. The wine was esteemed everywhere; it was said to possess the odor of nectar, and to be capable of mixture with twenty or more times its quantity with water. That the people of Maroneia venerated Dionysus, we learn not just from its famous Dionysian Sanctuary, the foundations of which can still be seen today, but also from the city's coins. It was a member of the Delian League.

In 200 BCE it was taken by Philip V of Macedon; and when he was ordered by the Romans to evacuate the towns of Thrace, he vented his rage by slaughtering a great number of the inhabitants of the city. The Roman Republic subsequently granted Maroneia to Attalus, King of Pergamon, but almost immediately revoked their gift and declared it a free city.

Maroneia was the largest and most important of all ancient Greek colonies of Western Thrace. The city owed its prosperity to the extensive and rich territory and to the port which favored the development of intense commercial activity. Furthermore, Romans had granted many privileges to the city, such as the proclamation of its freedom and the increase of its territory, where a dense network of rural settlements was developed.

Today's settlement is located on the hillside of mount Ismaros. It was transferred there in the 17th century CE due to the threat of piracy.

During the Greek Revolution of 1821, people from Maroneia, like Panagiotis Michanidis and Georgios Gevidis, supported the revolt.

In December 1877 Captain Petko Voyvoda overthrew the Ottoman rule and established free administration in the town.

== Ecclesiastical history ==
In 1316 the church of Maroneia was received by the metropolis of Chalcedon, which was facing severe decline, until 1327.

It is the seat of a Roman Catholic titular bishopric called Maronea.

== Notable people ==
- Metrocles (4th century BC), Cynic philosopher
- Hipparchia, Cynic philosopher and sister of Metrocles
- Sotades (3rd century BC), poet
- Petko Kiryakov (Captain Petko Voyvoda) (1844–1900), Bulgarian politician and leader of the national revolution
- Archbishop Michael of America (1892-1958)

== Sources ==
- Durando, Furio, Greece: A Guide to the Archaeological Sites, 2004.
- Herbermann, Charles, ed. (1913). "Maronia" . Catholic Encyclopedia. New York: Robert Appleton Company.
- Smith, William, (1857), Dictionary of Greek and Roman Geography.
- Psoma, Selene, Chryssa Karadima and Domna Terzopoulou, The Coins from Maroneia and the Classical City at Molyvoti: A Contribution to the History of Aegean Thrace (Athens: Diffusion de Boccard, 2008) (Meletemata, 62).
