= Sostis =

Sostis Σώστης
- Municipal unit
- Location within the regional unit

- Location within Greece
- Coordinates: 41°08′N 25°17′E
- Country: Greece
- Administrative region: East Macedonia and Thrace
- Regional unit: Rhodope
- Municipality: Iasmos

Area
  - Municipal unit: 229.2 km^{2} (88.5 sq mi)
- Elevation: 60 m (200 ft)

Population (2021)
  - Municipal unit: 5,521
  - Municipal unit density: 24.09/km^{2} (62.39/sq mi)
  - Community: 632
- Time zone: UTC+2 (EET)
  - Summer (DST): UTC+3 (EEST)
- Vehicle registration: ΚΟ

Sostis (Greek: Σώστης, romanized: Sóstis; Turkish: Susurköy) is a village and a former municipality in the Rhodope regional unit, East Macedonia and Thrace, Greece. Since the 2011 local government reform it is part of the municipality Iasmos, of which it is a municipal unit. The municipal unit has an area of 229.190 km^{2}. The population was 5,521 in 2021.
