= Rhodope (regional unit) =

Rhodope Περιφερειακή ενότητα Ροδόπης
- Regional unit
- Municipalities of Rhodope

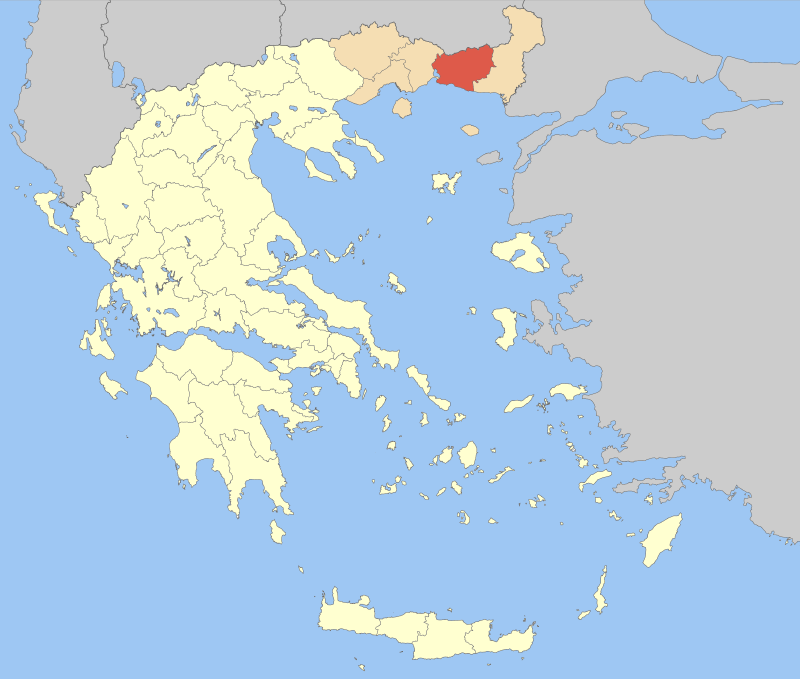
- Rhodope within Greece

- Location within Greece
- Coordinates: 41°05′N 25°25′E
- Country: Greece
- Administrative region: Eastern Macedonia and Thrace
- Seat: Komotini

Area
  - Total: 2,543 km^{2} (982 sq mi)

Population (2021)
  - Total: 104,262
  - Density: 41.00/km^{2} (106.2/sq mi)
- Time zone: UTC+2 (EET)
  - Summer (DST): UTC+3 (EEST)
- Postal code: 69x xx
- Area code: 253x0
- Vehicle registration: ΚΟ

Rhodope (Greek: Ροδόπη, Rodópi [roˈðopi]) is one of the regional units of Greece. It is part of the region of East Macedonia and Thrace. Its name is derived from the Rhodope Mountains, which cover the northern part of its territory. Together with the regional units Evros and Xanthi, it forms the geographical region of Western Thrace. The capital of the prefecture is the city of Komotini. The second largest town is Sapes. Most of the Muslims of Thrace, the only officially recognized minority in Greece, are settled in this area, where they form around half of the regional unit's population.

== Geography ==
Rhodope borders on the regional unit Xanthi to the west and Evros to the east, and on Bulgaria's Kardzhali Province to the north. The Aegean Sea lies to the south. The eastern Rhodope Mountains cover the northern part of the regional unit. Apart from the mountainous areas, the territory consists mainly of farmland, forests and grasslands.

The southern and the central part have a mainly Mediterranean climate, and the northern part a mainly continental climate with cold winters.

== Administration ==
The regional unit Rhodope is subdivided into 4 municipalities. These are (number as in the map in the infobox):

- Arriana (2)
- Iasmos (3)
- Komotini (1)
- Maroneia-Sapes (4)

In 2015 this regional unit has three seats in the Hellenic Parliament.

=== Prefecture ===
Rhodope was established as a prefecture in 1930 (Greek: Νομός Ροδόπης), when the former Thrace Prefecture was divided into the Rhodope and Evros prefectures. In 1944 Xanthi Prefecture was created from the western part of Rhodope Prefecture. Since the 1990s Rhodope cooperated with Evros in the Rhodope-Evros Super-prefecture.

As a part of the 2011 Kallikratis government reform, the prefecture was transformed into a regional unit within the East Macedonia and Thrace region, with no change in its boundaries. At the same time, the municipalities were reorganised, according to the table below.

The Rhodope regional unit had 104,380 in accordance with the 2021 census results, a decline from 112,039 inhabitants in the 2011 census results. The capital of the Regional unit is Komotini which has an estimated urban population of 55,000. It is the largest settlement in the regional unit. It also serves as the capital of the Eastern Macedonia and Thrace administrative region.

New municipality	Old municipalities	Seat
Arriana	Arriana	Fillyra
Arriana	Kechros	Fillyra
Arriana	Organi	Fillyra
Arriana	Fillyra	Fillyra
Iasmos	Iasmos	Iasmos
Iasmos	Amaxades	Iasmos
Iasmos	Sostis	Iasmos
Komotini	Komotini	Komotini
Komotini	Aigeiros	Komotini
Komotini	Neo Sidirochori	Komotini
Maroneia-Sapes	Maroneia	Sapes
Maroneia-Sapes	Sapes	Sapes

=== Provinces ===
- Province of Komotini - Komotini
- Province of Sapes - Sapes

Note: Provinces no longer hold any legal status in Greece.

=== Sites of interest ===
- The ancient city Anastasioupolis-Peritheorion with the medieval towers south-east of Amaxades
- The Imaret of Komotini, one of the oldest Ottoman monuments in Thrace from 1360 - 1380
- The Papikio mountain with the ruins of early Christian monasteries
- The trip route from Arriana to the east, as far as the borders with Evros, within the forest
- The suburban forest of Nymphaea, north of Komotini
- The ancient Maronia
- The "Thracian Meteora" - scenic landscape with wild nature and wild horses north of Iasmos
- The circumcenter temple of 11th - 13th century of Maximianoupolis - Mosynoupolis few km west of Komotini
- Archaeological Museum of Komotini
- Folklore Museum of Komotini
- Byzantine Museum of Komotini
- Carathéodory Museum, dedicated to Constantin Carathéodory, in Komotini
- Thracian, Ethnological, Historical and Cultural museum, in Komotini

=== Beaches and resorts ===
1. Petrota beach
2. Synaxi beach
3. Marmaritsa
4. Agios Charalampos' beach
5. Kangeles, near Maronia
6. Platanitis
7. Alkyona
8. Proskynites' beach or Kryoneri
9. Profitis Ilias
10. Imeros' beach
11. Karousmilou
12. Molyvoti
13. Chrysophora islet
14. Glyfada's beach
15. Paralia Mesis (with Blue flag 2014)
16. Arogi's beaches (1 of them with Blue flag 2014)
17. Fanari beaches (2 of them with Blue flag 2014)

== Gallery ==
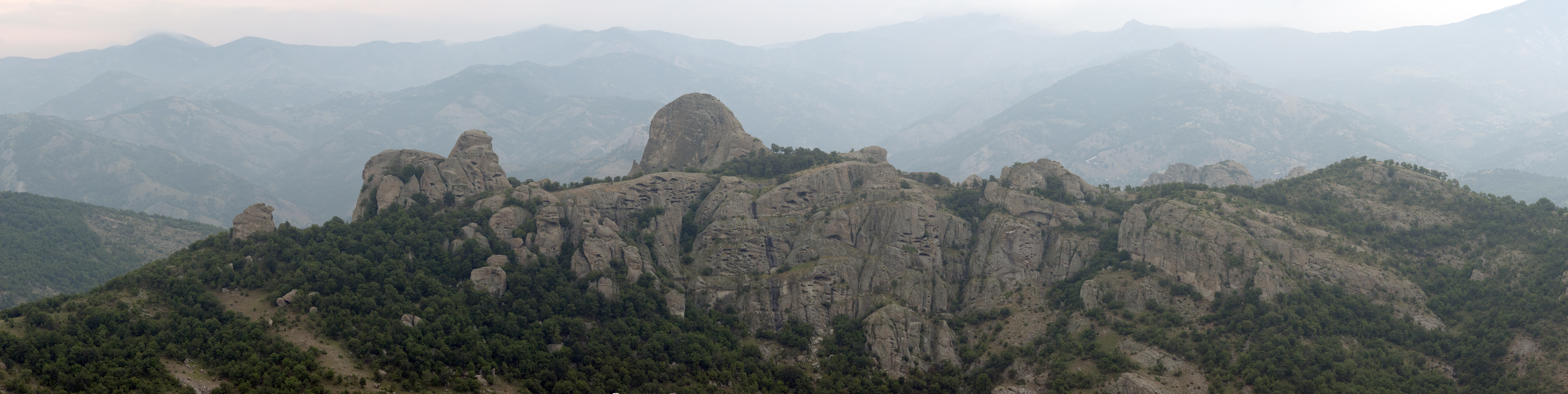
Thracian Meteora.

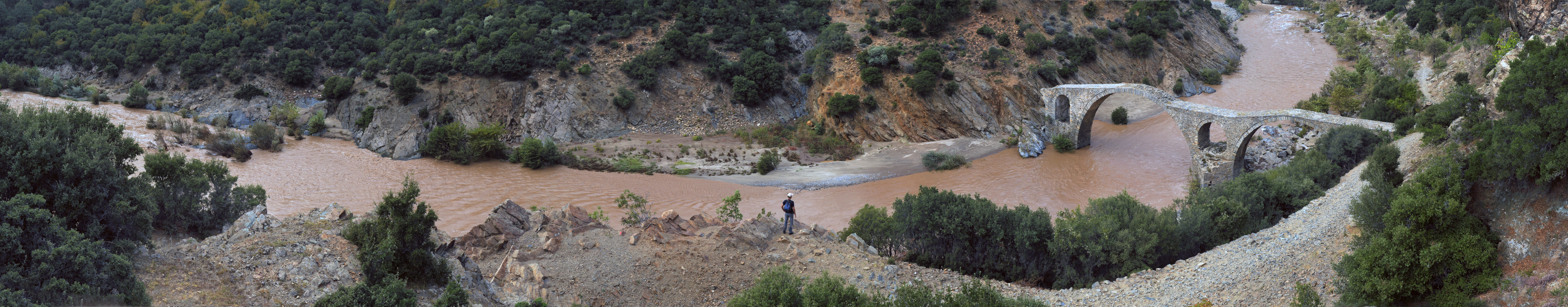
The bridge of Kompsatos river of 17th century.

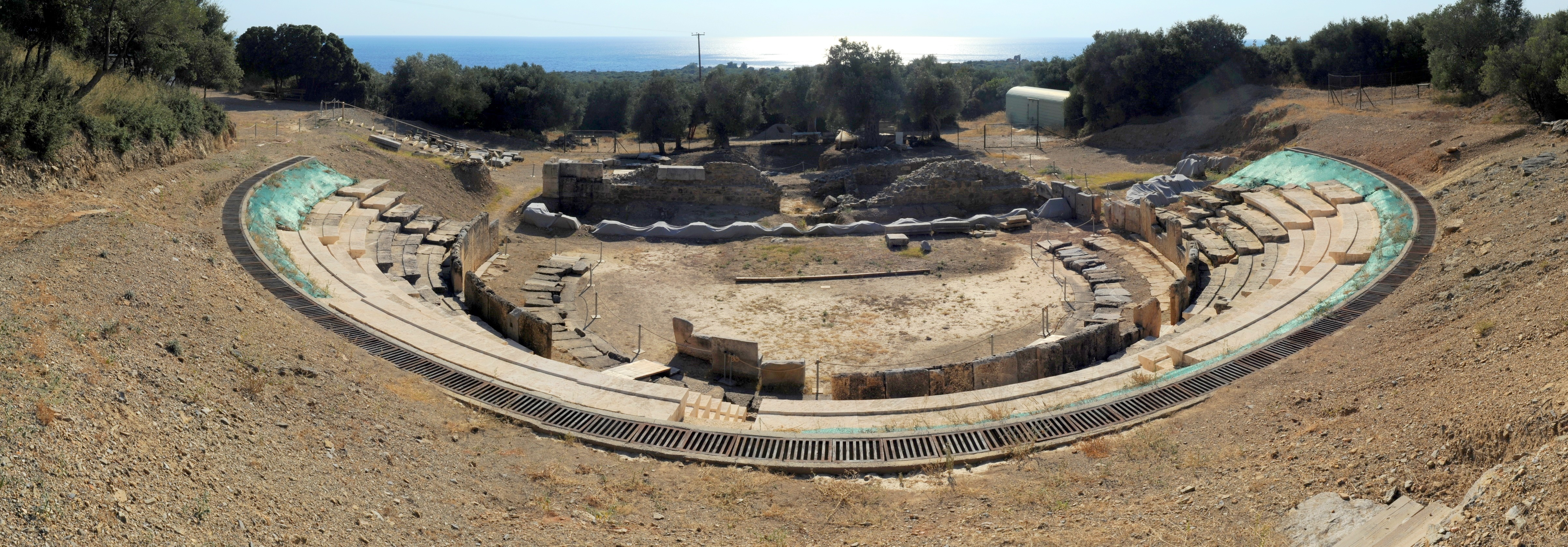
The ancient theatre of Maronia.

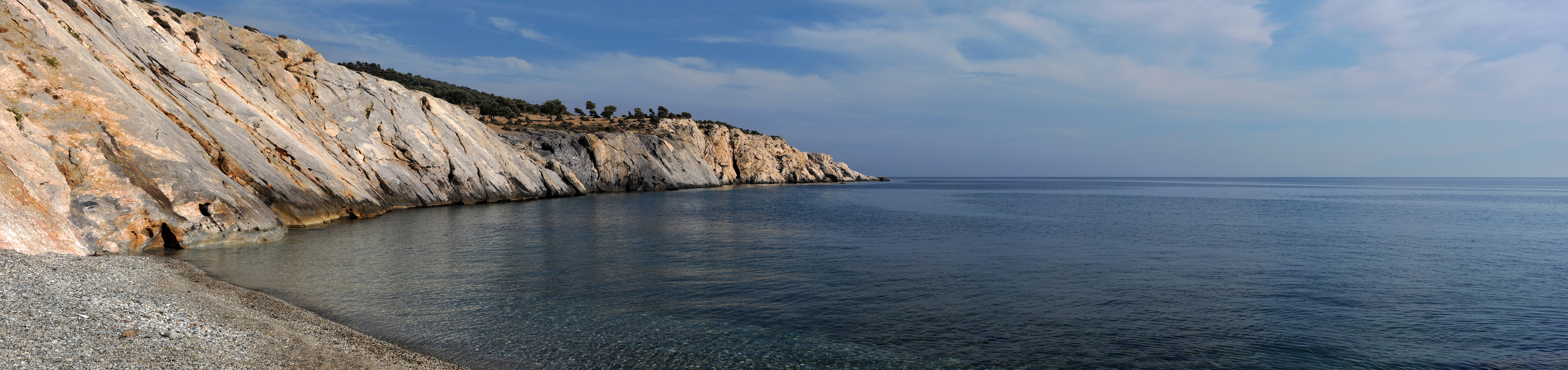
Marmaritsa beach and the active rift of Maronia - Makri.

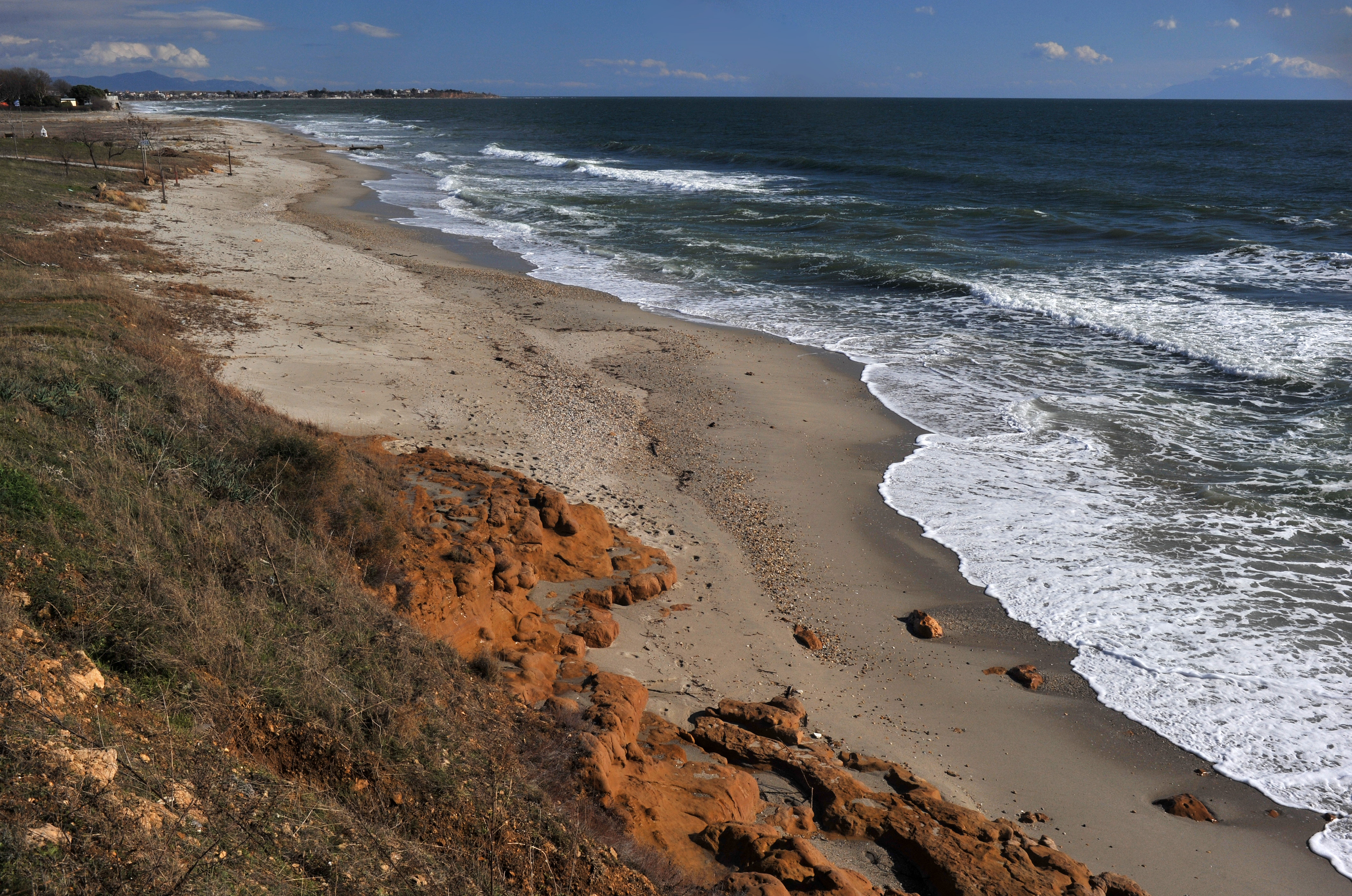
Sandy beach in Fanari.

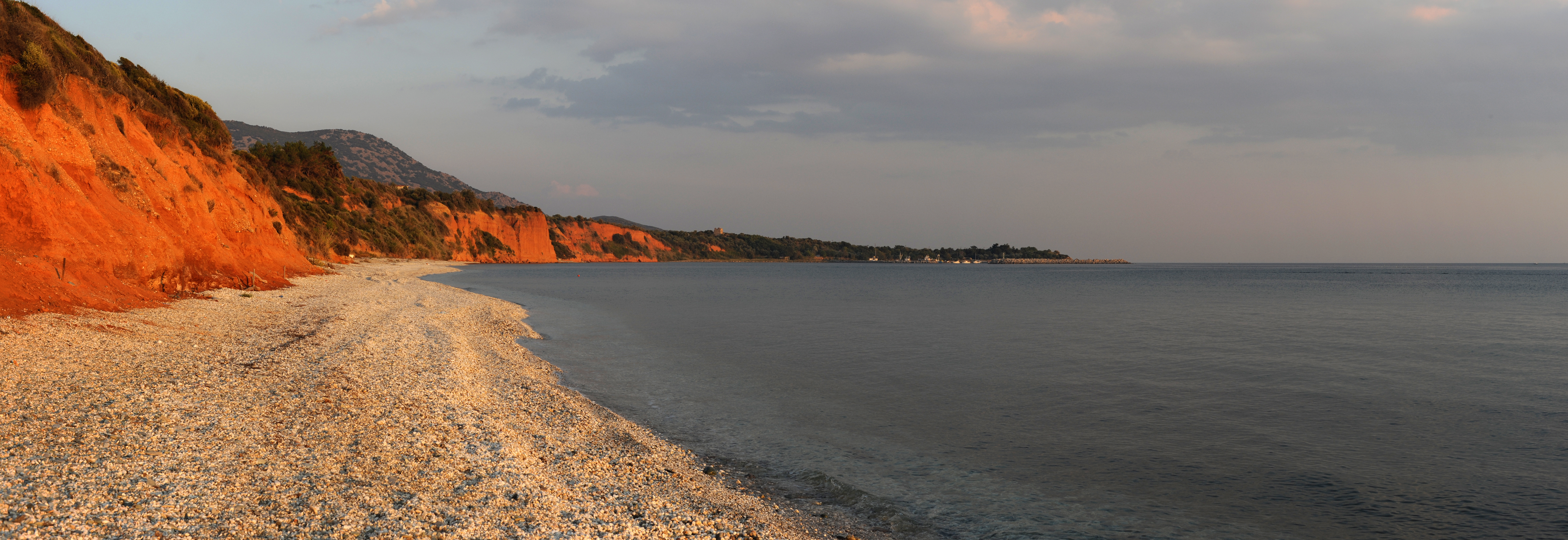
Kangeles beach.

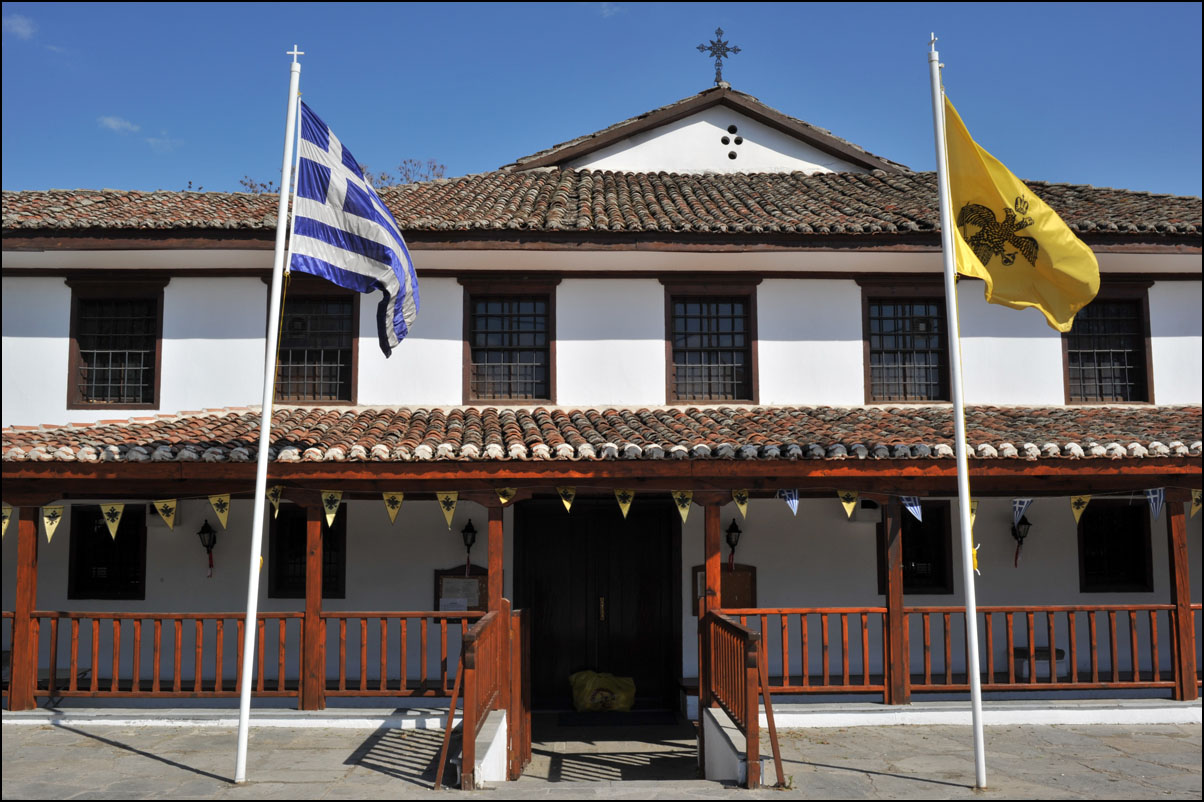
The post-Byzantine church of Dormition of the Mother of God in Komotini (1800).

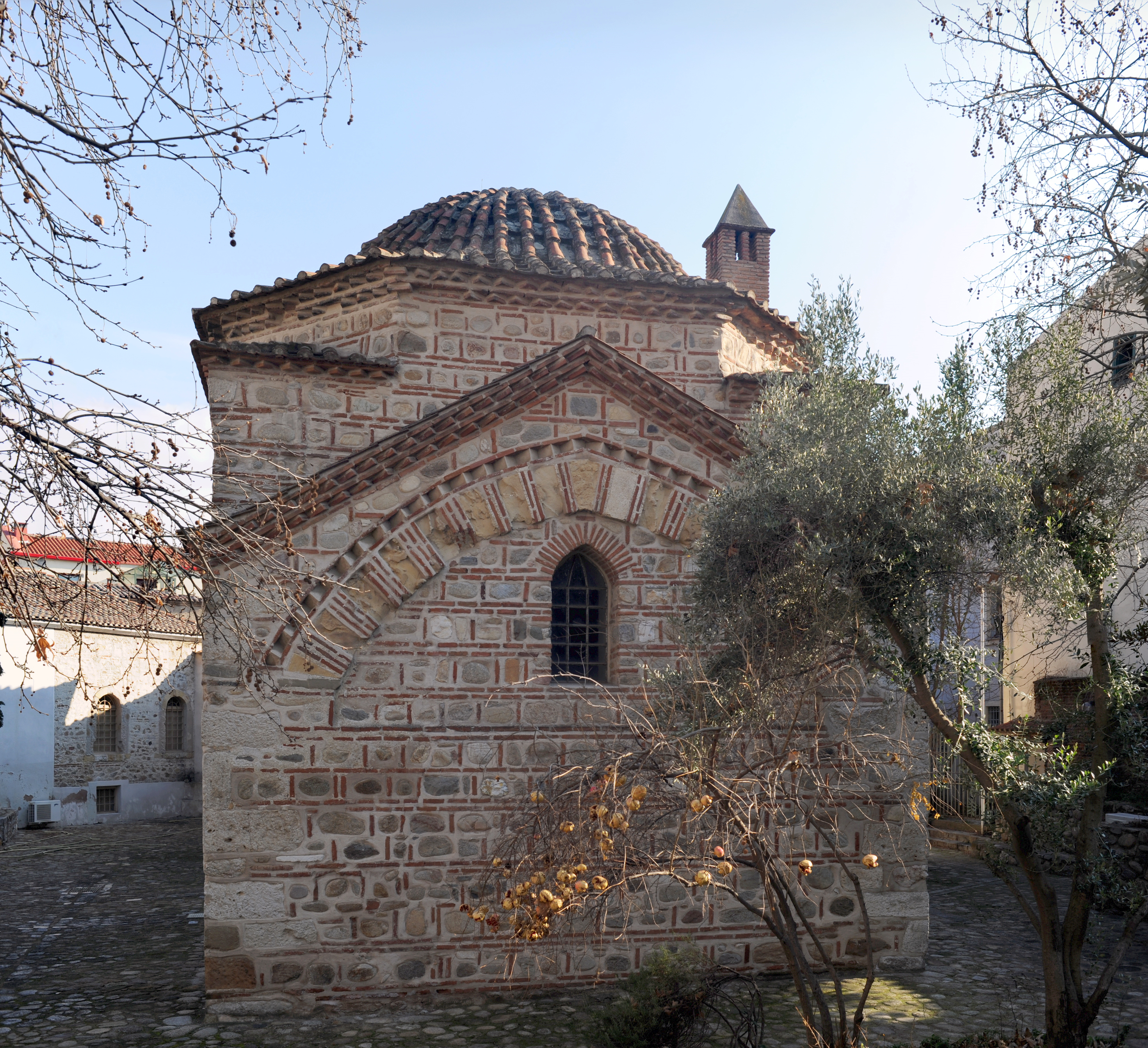
The Imaret of Komotini.

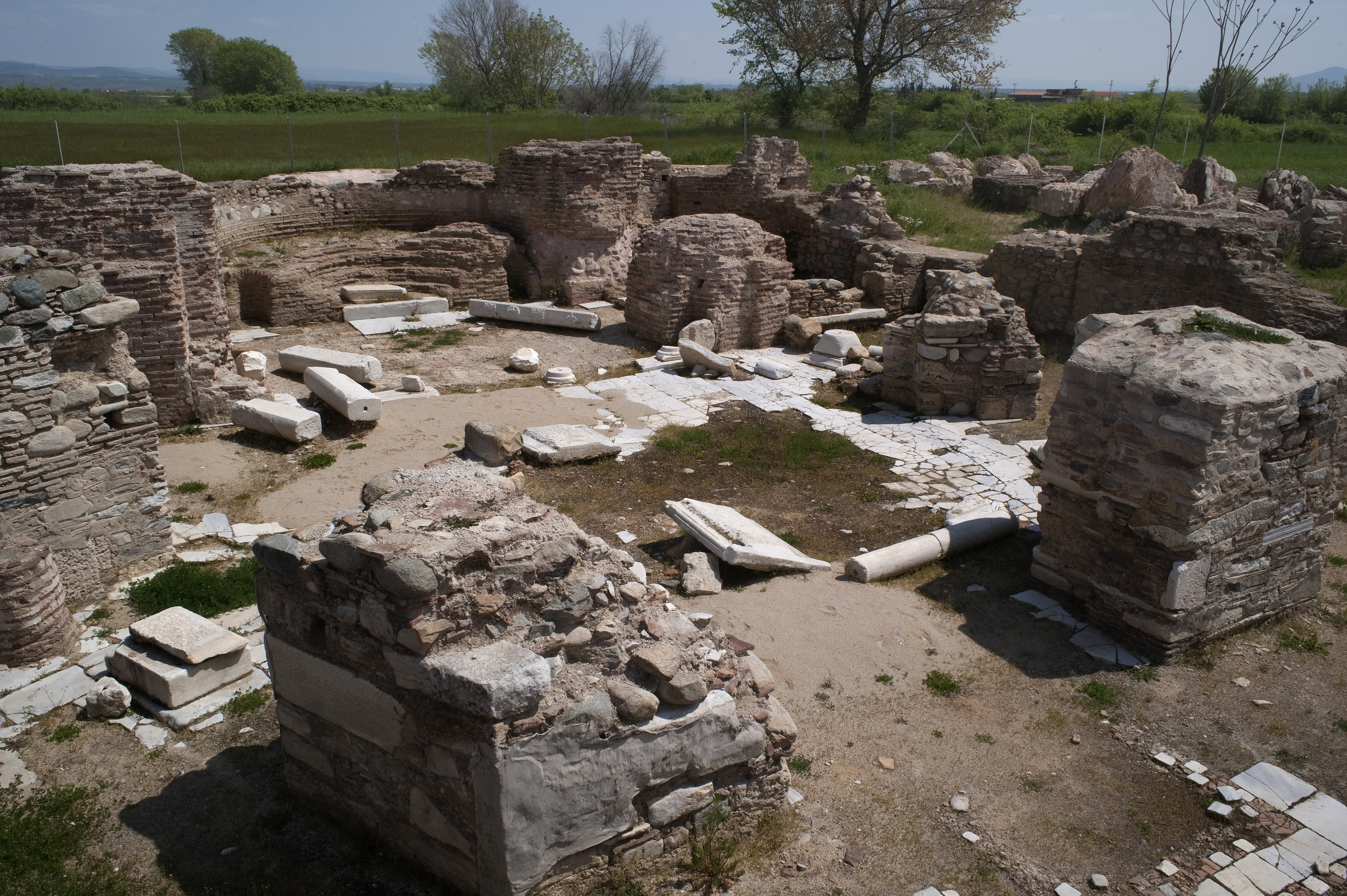
The circumcenter temple of Maximianoupolis - Mosynoupolis.

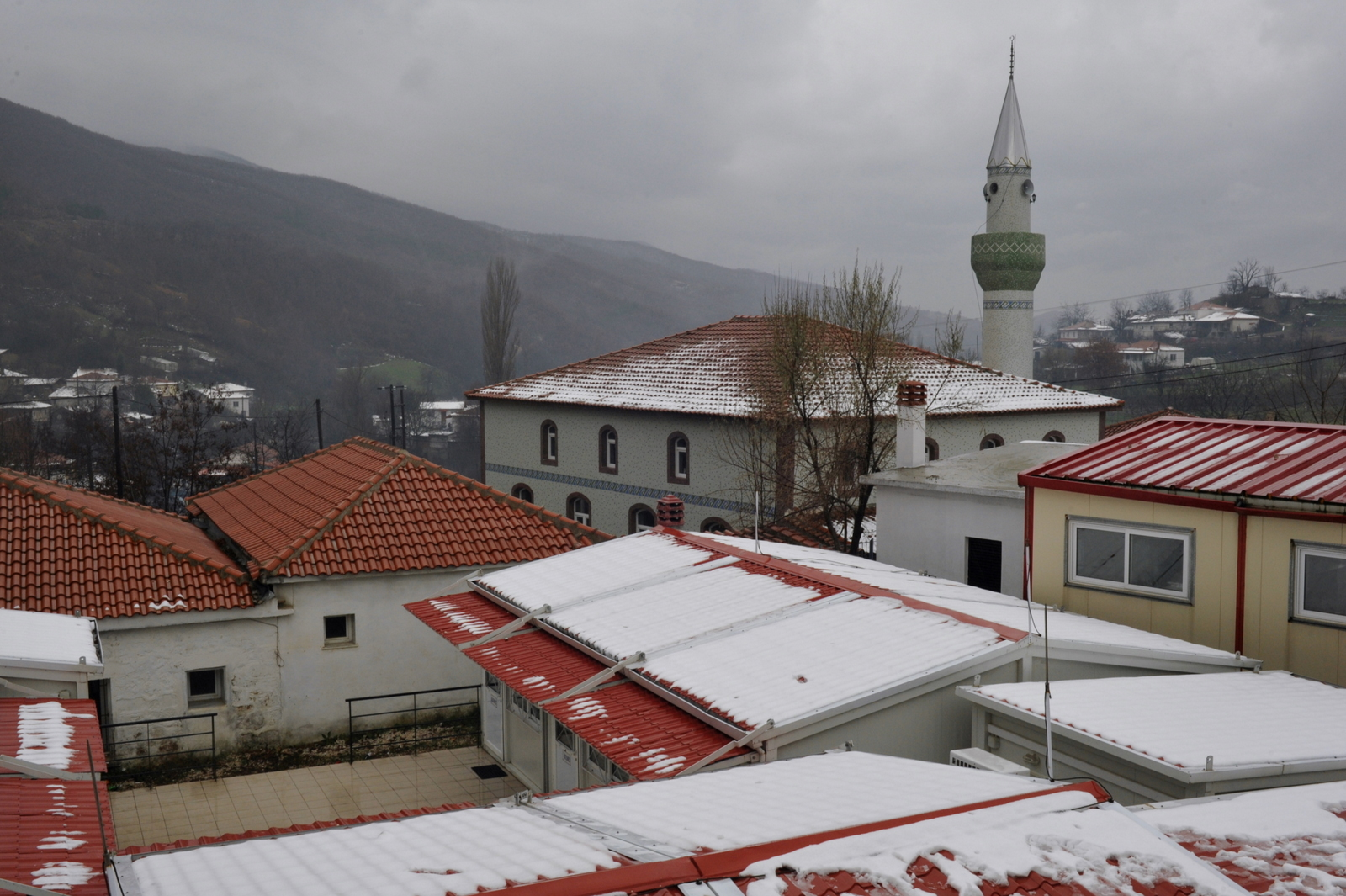
Organi village in mountainous Rhodope.

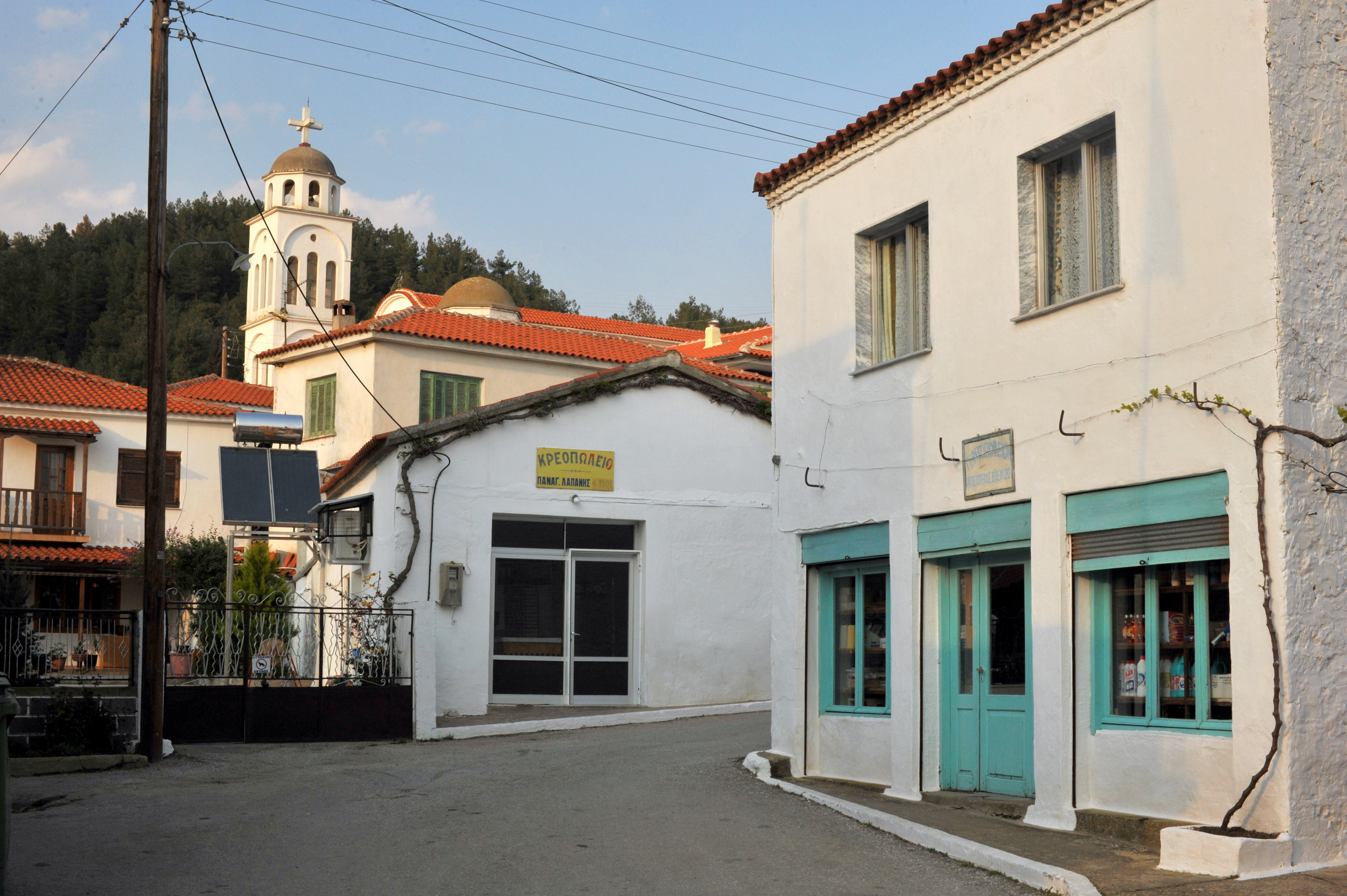
Gratini village.

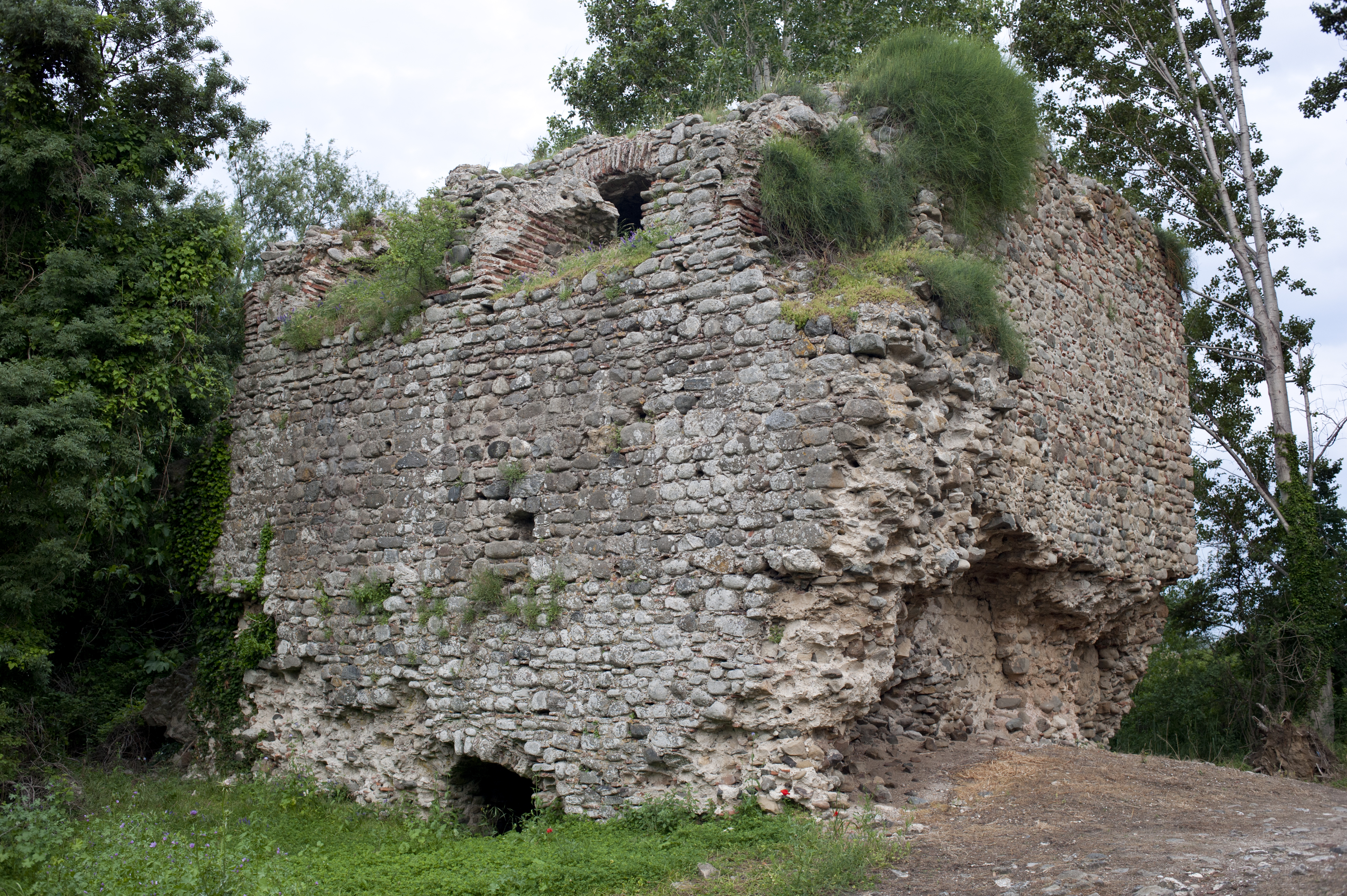
Tower in Anastasioupolis - Peritheorion.

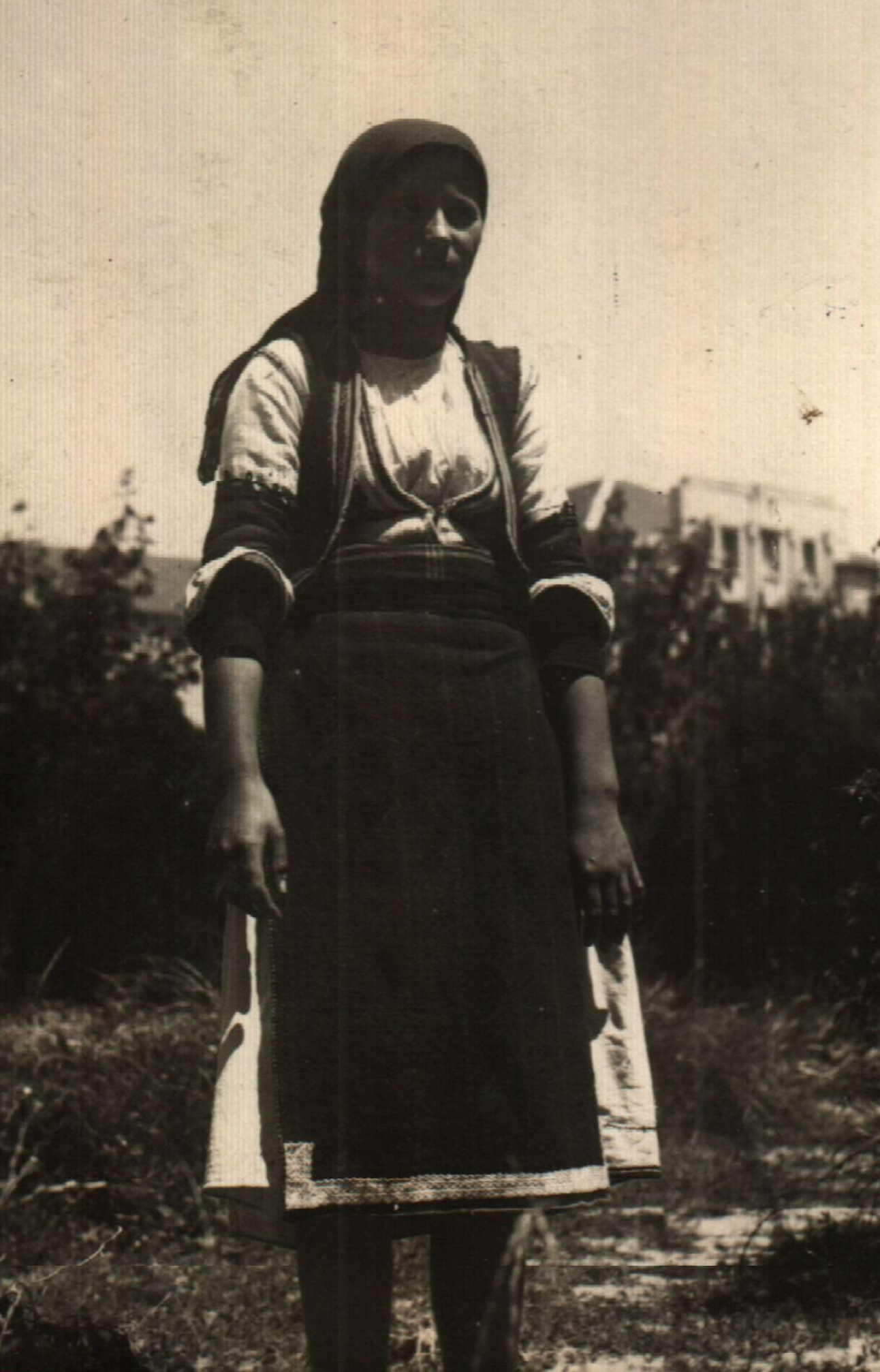
A traditional female costume of the Bulgarian community of Rodopi.

== Transport ==
The Thessaloniki–Alexandroupolis railway passes through the regional unit, with the main train station being in Komotini. The main roads include: the A2 motorway, part of European route E90; the A23 expressway; and the EO2 road: the EO53 road briefly runs along the regional unit's eastern border, near Leptokarya.

== See also ==
- List of settlements in the Rhodope regional unit
