= Arriana =

Arriana Αρριανά
- Municipality
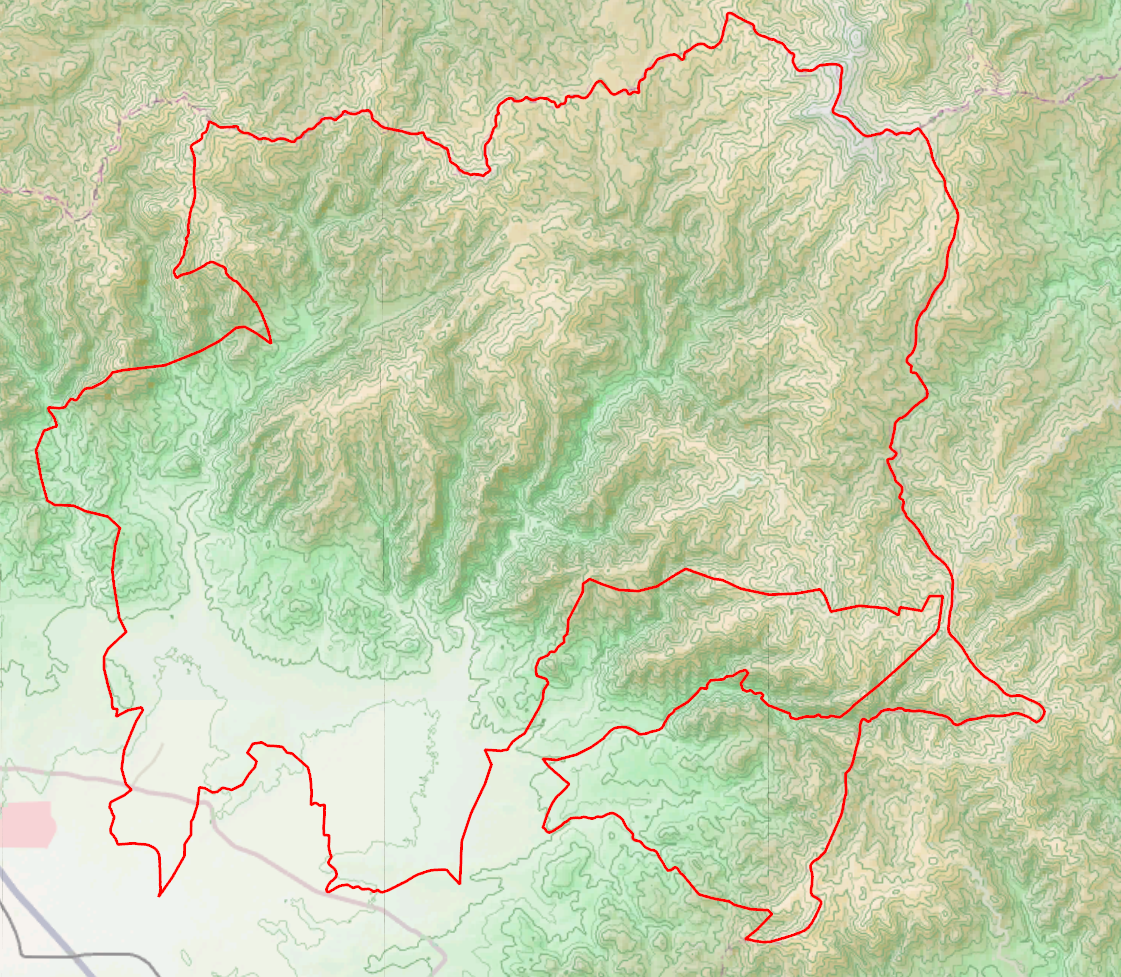
- Arriana municipality map.

- Location within Greece
- Coordinates: 41°05′N 25°42′E
- Country: Greece
- Administrative region: Eastern Macedonia and Thrace
- Regional unit: Rhodope

Government
  - Mayor: Erdem Chousein (since 2023)

Area
  - Municipality: 771.2 km^{2} (297.8 sq mi)
  - Municipal unit: 178.4 km^{2} (68.9 sq mi)

Population (2021)
  - Municipality: 14,905
  - Density: 19.33/km^{2} (50.06/sq mi)
  - Municipal unit: 5,288
  - Municipal unit density: 29.64/km^{2} (76.77/sq mi)
  - Community: 1,112
- Time zone: UTC+2 (EET)
  - Summer (DST): UTC+3 (EEST)
- Vehicle registration: ΚΟ
- Website: https://www.arriana.gr

Arriana (Greek: Αρριανά) is a municipality in the Rhodope regional unit, Greece. The seat of the municipality is in Fillyra.

== Municipality ==
The municipality Arriana was formed at the 2011 local government reform by the merger of the following 4 former municipalities, that became municipal units:

- Arriana
- Fillyra
- Kechros
- Organi

The municipality has an area of 771.175 km^{2}, the municipal unit 178.391 km^{2}.

== Election results ==
=== Parliamentary ===
2000

2004

2007

2009

5/2012

6/2012

1/2015

9/2015

2019

5/2023

6/2023

=== European ===
2009

2014

2019

2024

== Notable people ==
- Mehmet Müezzinoğlu (b. 1955), Turkish doctor and politician
