= List of cities of Thrace =

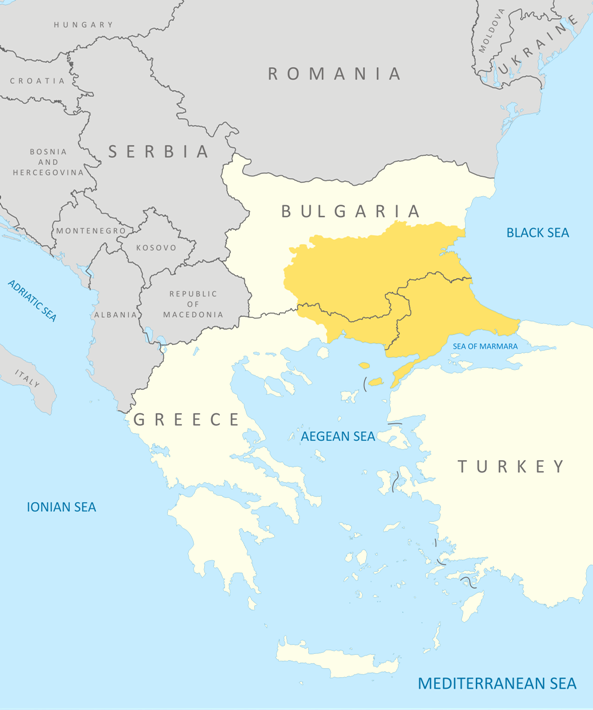
The modern boundaries of Thrace in Bulgaria, Greece and Turkey

This is a list of cities and towns in Thrace, a geographical region split between Bulgaria, Greece and Turkey. The largest cities of Thrace are: Istanbul (European side), Plovdiv, Burgas, Edirne, and Stara Zagora.

== Eastern Thrace (Turkey) ==
Cities in Eastern Thrace:

- Ahmediye (Greek: Φανοσάκρες Fanosakres / Φανοσάρκες Fanosarkes / Fanos Akrai)
- Akalan (Greek: Μέτραι Metrae)
- Akbaş (Sestos) (Greek: Σηστός Sistos)
- Akören (Anaka, Avren, Akviran) (Bulgarian: Аврен Avren)
- Alçıtepe (Kirte) (Greek: Κριθιά Krithia)
- Alpullu (Greek: Αλεπλή Alepli, Bulgarian: Алпулу Alpulu)
- Armutveren (Paspala) (Bulgarian: Паспалово Paspalovo / Паспалево Paspalevo / Паспала Paspala)
- Atışalanı (Greek: Avas)
- Ambarlı (Amindos) (Greek: Άμπαρλι Ambarli / Amindos)
- Aydınlar (Greek: Alaton)
- Babaeski (Greek: Βουρτοδιζό Bourtodizo / Καβύλη Kavyli / Βουργουδισσός Borgoudissos)
- Barbaros (Greek: Πανίδος Panidos)
- Başak (Sivas) (Greek: Sivas)
- Beğendik (Ayostefano) (Greek: Άγιος Στέφανος Agios Stefanos, Bulgarian: Свети Стефан Sveti Stefan / Стефанo Stefano / Стефания Stefaniya)
- Beğendik (Beyendik) (Greek: Ηρωικό Iroiko)
- Binkılıç (Istranca) (Greek: Strantza, Bulgarian: Странджа Strandža)
- Bolayır (Greek: Πλαγιάρι Plagiari, Bulgaristan: Булаир Bulair)
- Büyükçekmece (Çekmece-i Kebir) (Greek: Άθυρος Athyros / Άθυρα Athyra / Mega Zeûgma / Áthyras)
- Büyükkarıştıran (Greek: Δρουσίπαρα Drousipara / Δριζίπαρος Driziparos / Μεσσηνη Messini)
- Celaliye (Şatıroz, Çetros, Sahteros) (Greek: Ξάστερο Ksastero / Heksastérion / Heksastros / Heksásteron)
- Çakıl (Greek: Πετροχώρι Petrohori / Τσακήλι Tsakili)
- Çatalca (Metra) (Greek: Μέτρες Metres / Ἐργίσκη Ergískē / Métrai / Pharsalos / Pharsala, Bulgarian: Чаталджа Chataldzha)
- Çerkezköy (Türbedere) (Greek: Τσερκέζκιοϊ Tserkezkioi)
- Çorlu (Greek: Τυρολόη Tyroloi / Συράλον Syralon; Bulgarian: Чорлу Chorlu)
- Çukurpınar (Sazara) (Bulgarian: Сазара Sazara)
- Demirköy (Bulgarian: Малък Самоков Malak Samokov; Greek: Μικρόν Σαμμακόβιον Mikron Sammakovion / Σαμάκοβο Samakovo / Σαμάκοβον Samakovon)
- Durusu (Terkos) (Greek: Δέρκος Derkos, Delkos)
- Edirne (Greek: Αδριανούπολη Adrianoupoli; Bulgarian: Одрин Odrin) refounded by Hadrian
- Eceabat (Maydos) (Greek: Μάδυτος Madytos)
- Elbasan (Greek: Ελβασάν Elbasan / Αλμπασαν Albasan / Alvanási / Aatios)
- Enez (Greek: Αίνος Ainos; Bulgarian: Енос Enos)
- Eriklice (Greek: Ηρακλίτσα Iraklitsa)
- Esenler (Greek: Litros)
- Esenyurt (Eşkinoz) (Greek: Eskinos / Theodorukome)
- Evreşe (Greek: Αφροδισία Afrodisia / Oρσα Orsa)
- Fener (Fenerköy) (Greek: Phanárion / Φανάρι Fanari, Bulgarian: Фенеркьой Fenerkoi)
- Firuzköy (Greek: Firos)
- Gaziköy (Greek: Γάνος Ganos)
- Gelibolu (Greek: Καλλίπολι Κallipoli (= beautiful city); Bulgarian: Галиполи Galipoli)
- Gelibolu Peninsula (Greek: Χερσόνησος της Καλλίπολης Hersonisos tis Kallipolis)
- Gümüşyaka (Eski Ereğli) (Greek: Παλιά Ηράκλεια Palia Irakleia)
- Gürpınar (Anarşa) (Greek: Αρεσού Aresoú / Αρετώ Areto / Αρσού Arsou / Ανάρσα Anarsa / Άνω Αρσού Anô Arsoú / Anarkha)
- Güzelce (Çöplüce) (Greek: Δημοκράνεια Dimokraneia / Δημοκράτεια Dimokrateia / Damokráneia, Panagía)
- Hacıdanişment (Cöke) (Bulgarian: ЧокеChoke)
- Haramidere (Güzelyurt) (Greek: Σταυροδρόμος Stavrodromos)
- Havza (Greek: Χάφσα Hafsa)
- Hayrabolu (Greek: Χαριούπολη Harioupoli)
- Hoşdere (Bojdar, Boşdere) (Bulgarian: Bojdar)
- Hoşköy (Hora) (Greek: Χώρα Hora)
- Işıklar (Greek: Σχολάρι Skholari)
- Ispartakule (Greek: Σπράδων Spradon)
- İğneada (Greek: Θυνιάς Thynias / Νιάδα Niada / Ινιάδα Iniada)
- İmrahor (Greek: Ιμβροχώρι Imvrohori)
- İpsala (Greek: Κύψελα Kypsela)
- Istanbul (European side) (Greek: Κωνσταντινούπολις Konstantinoupolis (= city of Constantine) or Βυζάντιον Vyzantion, the ancient Greek name, named after the founder of the city Vyzantas; Bulgarian: Цариград Tsarigrad or Константинопол Konstantinopol or Византион / Vizantion)
  - Arnavutköy (Greek: Μέγα Ρεύμα Mega Revma (= great stream))
  - Bakırköy (Greek: Μακροχώρι Makrohori / Έβδομον Ebdomon)
  - Beşiktaş (Greek: Διπλοκιόνιον Diplokionion)
  - Beyoğlu (Pera) (Greek: Πέρα Pera)
  - Boyacıköy (Greek: Βαφειοχώρι Vafeiohori)
  - Florya (Greek: Phlorion)
  - İstinye (Greek: Σωσθένιον Sosthenion)
  - Kumkapı (Greek: Κοντοσκάλι Kontoskali)
  - Kurtuluş (Tatavla) (Greek: Ταταύλα Tatavla)
  - Samatya (Greek: Ψαμάθεια Psamatheia)
  - Sarıyer (Greek: Σιμάς Simas)
  - Sultanahmet (Greek: Ιππόδρομος Ippodromos(= Hippodrome))
  - Şenlikköy (Greek: Kalitarya / Galatarya)
  - Taksim (Greek: Αγία Τριάς Agia Trias)
  - Tarabya (Greek: Θεραπειά Therapeia / Φαρμακεία Farmakeia)
  - Yedikule (Greek: Επταπύργιον Eptapyrgion (= seven towers))
  - Yeniköy (Greek: Νεοχώριον Neohorion (= new village))
- Kadıköy, Malkara (Bulgarian: Кадъкьой Kadikoi)
- Kâmiloba (Yaloz) (Greek: Αιγιαλοί Eyali)
- Karaağaç (Greek: Καραγάτς Karagats)
- Karacaköy (Belgratköy) (Greek: Βελιγραδάκι Beligradaki, Belgradáki (= little Belgrade))
- Kavakköy (Seydikavak, Lizimahiya, Lefki) (Greek: Λευκή Lefkī́, Bulgarian: Кавак Kavak)
- Kavaklı (Fete) (Greek: Fete)
- Kavaklı (Garda, Gardan, Garden) (Greek: Γάρδας, Γαρδάς Gardás)
- Kaynarca (Greek: Γέννα Genna)
- Kemerburgaz (Greek: Πύργος Pyrgos)
- Kermeyan (Greek: Ἄπρος Apros, Ἄπροι Ἄπροι, Apris, Apri)
- Keşan (Greek: Κεσσάνη Kessani; Bulgarian: Кешан Keshan)
- Kınalı (Greek: Kινάλι Kinali)
- Kıraç (Kalyos) (Greek: Kalios / Καλιώ Kalio)
- Kırklareli (Kırkkilise) (Bulgarian: Лозенград Lozengrad; Greek: Σαράντα Εκκλησιές Saranta Ekklysies(= forty churches))
- Kıyıköy (Midye) (Greek: Σαλμυδησσός Salmydissos / Μήδεια Mideia / Αλμυδησσός Almydissos; Bulgarian: Мидия Midiya)
- Kilitbahir (Greek: Κυνόσσημα Kynossima)
- Kilyos (Greek: Κίλια Kilia)
- Kofçaz (Bulgarian: Ковчас Kovchas)
- Kumburgaz (Greek: Οικονομοίο, Οικονομειό, Ikonomio, Konomio, Oikonomeíon, Oikonomeíou Pyrgos)
- Kurfallı (Greek: Koúrphaloi, Kainophroúrion, Kenophlôrion)
- Küçükçekmece (Greek: Ρήγιον Rigion (Rhegion), Βαθονεία Bathonea)
- Lalapaşa (Greek: Λαλά Πασά Lala Pasa)
- Lüleburgaz (Greek: Αρκαδιούπολις Arkadioupolis (= city of Arcadius) / Βεργούλη Bergouli; Bulgarian: Люлебургас Lyuleburgas)
- Mahmutbey (Greek: Κάλφας Kalfas)
- Malkara (Greek: Μάλγαρα Malgara, Bulgarian: Малгара Malgara)
- Marmara Ereğlisi (Greek: Πέρινθος Perinthos / Ηράκλεια Θρακική Irakleia Thrakiki)
- Marmara Mahallesi (Angurya), Yakuplu (Greek: Anguria)
- Mecidiye (Greek: Λόβρυς Lovrys)
- Mimarsinan, Greek: Kalikratiya (Καλλικράτεια Kallikráteia), neighbourhood of Büyükçekmece
- Muratlı (Greek: Μουρατλί Mouratli)
- Mürefte (Greek: Μυριόφυτο Myriofyto, Bulgarian: Мюрефте Myurefte)
- Nakkaş (Greek: Ennakósia, Hennakósia)
- Ovayenice (Nihor) (Greek: Νεοχώρι Neohori / Neochorion / Nichori)
- Ortaköy (Sürgünköy) (Greek: Δελλιώνες Delliones)
- Örencik (Tahirfakı, Tahırfağı, Tahir Fakih) (Greek: Tarfa)
- Pehlivanköy (Pavliköy) (Greek: Παυλίκιοϊ Pavlikioi)
- Pınarhisar (Greek: Βρύση Vrysi)
- Saray (Greek: Ανάκτορο Anaktoro)
- Sarayakpınar (Sırpsındığı) (Greek: Σαράικπινάρ Saraikpinar, Bulgarian: Акбунар Akbunar)
- Saros Gulf (Greek: Κόλπος Ξηρού Kolpos Ksyrou)
- Seddülbahir (Greek: Ελαιούς Elaious)
- Sefaköy (Safraköy, Sofraköy) (Greek: Sofranatis)
- Selimpaşa (Biğados, Bivados, Epivati) (Greek: Επιβάτες Epivates / Epibátes / Daoneion)
- Silivri (Greek: Σηλυμβρία Silymvria, Sêlymbria, Bulgarian: Силиврия Silivriya)
- Sinekli (Greek: Καινοφρούριον Kainophrourion)
- Şarköy (Greek: Περίσταση Peristasi / Τειρίστασις Teiristasis, Bulgarian: Шаркьой Sharkoi)
- Şerbettar (Şaraplar) (Greek: Σαραπλάρ Saraplar)
- Tekirdağ (Rodosçuk, Tekfurdağ) (Greek: Ραιδεστός Raidestos / Βυσάνθη Bysanthi; Bulgarian: Родосто Rodosto)
- Tepecik (Playa) (Greek: Πλάγια Plágia)
- Türkoba (Greek: Λαγοθήρες Lagothires)
- Uçmakdere (Greek: Αϋδίμιο Aidimio)
- Uzunköprü (Greek: Μακρά Γέφυρα Makra Gefyra (= long bridge); Bulgarian: Узункьопрю Uzunkyopryu)
- Üsküp (Greek: Σκοπός Skopos)
- Vize (Greek: Βιζύη Vizyi)
- Yakuplu (Trakatya, Tarakatiya) (Greek: Trakadia / Trakada / Trakatia / Trakas)
- Yalıköy (Podima) (Greek: Πόδημα Podima, Pódêma (= boot)/ Ασκός Askós)
- Yarımburgaz (Greek (incorrectly): Melantias or Melantiada, Schiza)
- Yazlıkköy (Greek: Lazaroxôri)
- Yeşilbayır (Muha) (Greek: Muxa)
- Yeşilköy (Ayastefanos) (Greek: Αγιος Στέφανος Agios Stefanos, Bulgarian: Сан Стефано San Stefano / Йешилкьой Yeshilkoi, Свети Стефан Sveti Stefan)
- Yıldız Mountains (Istranca) (Bulgarian: Странджа Strandja; Greek: Στρά(ν)τζα Stra(n)tza)
- Yoğuntaş (Greek: Σκόπελος Skopelos)
- Yolçatı (Gelevri) (Greek: Kalabría, Kalaurê)

== Northern Thrace (Bulgaria) ==
Cities in Northern Thrace:

- Burgas (Bulgarian: Бургас; Greek: Πύργος Pyrgos (= tower); Turkish: Burgaz)
  - Ahtopol (Bulgarian: Ахтопол; Greek: Αγαθούπολη /Agathopolis; Turkish: Ahtabolu)
  - Aytos (Bulgarian: Айтос; Greek: Αετός Aetos (= eagle); Turkish: Aydos)
  - Emona (Bulgarian: Емона; Turkish: Emine)
  - Gyulyovtsa (Bulgarian: Гюльовца; Turkish: Güller)
  - Kameno (Bulgarian: Камено; Turkish: Kayalı)
  - Karnobat (Bulgarian: Карнобат; Turkish: Karinabat)
  - Kosharitsa (Bulgarian: Кошарица; Turkish: Kışla Dere)
  - Koznitsa (Bulgarian: Козница; Turkish: Karamanca)
  - Malko Tarnovo (Bulgarian: Малко Търново; Turkish: Tırnovacık)
  - Nesebar (Bulgarian: Несебър; Greek: Μεσημβρία Mesembria; Turkish: Misivri)
  - Obzor (Bulgarian: Обзор; Turkish: Gözeken)
  - Orizare (Bulgarian: Оризаре; Turkish: Baraklı / Bayraklı)
  - Panitsovo (Bulgarian: Паницово; Turkish: Alçak Dere)
  - Pomorie (Bulgarian: Поморие; Greek: Αγχίαλος Anchialos; Turkish: Ahyolu)
  - Primorsko (Bulgarian: Приморско; Turkish: Köprü Liman)
  - Priseltsi (Bulgarian: Приселци; Turkish: Yeniköy)
  - Rakovskovo (Bulgarian: Раковсково; Turkish: Kuru Dere)
  - Ruen (Bulgarian: Руен; Turkish: Ulanlı / Oğlanlı)
  - Rusokastro (Bulgarian: Русокастро; Turkish: Rus Kasrı / Rusi Kasrı)
  - Sinemorets (Bulgarian: Синеморец; Turkish: Kalanca)
  - Sozopol (Bulgarian: Созопол; Greek: Σωζόπολη Sozopoli; Turkish: Süzebolu)
  - Sredets (Bulgarian: Средец; Turkish: Kara Pınar / Sülmeşli)
  - Sungurlare (Bulgarian: Сунгурларе; Turkish: Sungurlar)
  - Sveti Vlas (Bulgarian: Свети Влас; Turkish: Küçük Manastır)
  - Tankovo (Bulgarian: Тънково; Turkish: İnce Köy)
  - Tsarevo (Bulgarian: Царево; Greek: Βασιλικό / Vassiliko (= royal); Turkish: Vasilikoz)
- Haskovo (Bulgarian: Хасково; Turkish: Hasköy)
  - Dimitrovgrad (Bulgarian: Димитровград; Turkish: Kayacık)
  - Generalovo (Bulgarian: Генералово; Turkish: Paşaköy)
  - Harmanli (Bulgarian: Харманли; Turkish: Harmanlı)
  - Ivaylovgrad (Bulgarian: Ивайловград; Greek: Αρτάκη Artake; Turkish: Ortaköy)
  - Kapitan Andreevo (Bulgarian: Капитан Андреево; Turkish: Viran Tekke)
  - Lyubimets (Bulgarian: Любимец; Turkish: Habibçeova)
  - Madzharovo (Bulgarian: Маджарово; Turkish: Yatakçık)
  - Mineralni Bani (Bulgarian: Минерални бани; Turkish: Meriçler)
  - Simeonovgrad (Bulgarian: Симеоновград; Turkish: Seymen)
  - Stambolovo (Bulgarian: Стамболово; Turkish: Eller)
  - Svilengrad (Bulgarian: Свиленград; Turkish: Cisri Mustafapaşa)
  - Topolovgrad (Bulgarian: Тополовград; Turkish: Kavaklı, Greek: Καβακλή Kavakli)
- Kardzhali (Bulgarian: Кърджали; Greek: Κάρτζαλι; Turkish: Kırcaali)
  - Ardino (Bulgarian: Ардино; Turkish: Eğridere)
  - Chernoochene (Bulgarian: Черноочене; Turkish: Karagözler / Yeni Pazar)
  - Dzhebel (Bulgarian: Джебел; Turkish: Cebel / Şeyh Cuma)
  - Kirkovo (Bulgarian: Кирково; Turkish: Kırkova / Kızılağaç)
  - Krumovgrad (Bulgarian: Крумовград; Turkish: Koşukavak)
  - Momchilgrad (Bulgarian: Момчилград; Turkish: Mestanlı / Sultanyeri)
- Pazardzhik (Bulgarian: Пазарджик; Turkish: Pazarcık / Tatarpazarcığı / Tatarpazarcık)
  - Batak (Bulgarian: Батак; Turkish: Batak)
  - Isperikhovo (Bulgarian: Исперихово; Turkish: Aydınköy)
  - Panagyurishte (Bulgarian: Панагюрище; Turkish: Otlukköy / Panagürişte)
  - Peshtera (Bulgarian: Пещера; Greek: Περιστέρα Peristera (= pigeon); Turkish: Peştere)
  - Pistiros (Bulgarian: Пистирос; Greek: Πίστειρος Pistiros)
  - Rakitovo (Bulgarian: Ракитово; Turkish: Rakit Ova)
  - Sarnitsa (Bulgarian: Сърница; Turkish: Sarnıç / Şabanlı)
  - Septemvri (Bulgarian: Септември; Turkish: Saranbey / Saruhanbey / Sarahanbey / Saruhan)
  - Strelcha (Bulgarian: Стрелча; Turkish: İstirelçe)
  - Velingrad (Bulgarian: Велинград; Turkish: Çepine & Ilıcalar & Kameniçe)
- Plovdiv (Bulgarian: Пловдив; Turkish: Filibe, Greek: Φιλιππούπολη Philippoupoli)
  - Asenovgrad (Bulgarian: Асеновград; Greek: Στενήμαχος / Stenimachos; Turkish: İstanimaka)
  - Banya (Bulgarian: Баня; Turkish: Banya)
  - Hisarya (Bulgarian: Хисаря; Turkish: Hisar (=fort))
  - Kaloyanovo (Bulgarian: Калояново)
  - Karlovo (Bulgarian: Карлово; Turkish: Karlıova)
  - Krichim (Bulgarian: Кричим; Turkish: Kırçma / Kriçime)
  - Maritsa (Bulgarian: Марица; Turkish: Meriç)
  - Parvomay (Bulgarian: Първомай; Turkish: Hacı İlyas)
  - Perushtitsa (Bulgarian: Перущица; Turkish: Peruştiçe)
  - Rakovski (Bulgarian: Раковски; Turkish: Sarı Kılıçlı & Baltacılar & Ali Fakıh)
  - Sadovo (Bulgarian: Садово; Turkish: Çeşnegir)
  - Saedinenie (Bulgarian: Съединение; Turkish: Büyük Koruköy / Koruköy / Karaağaç Koruköy)
  - Stamboliyski (Bulgarian: Стамболийски; Turkish: Yeni Kırçma / Yeni Kriçime)
- Sliven (Bulgarian: Сливен; Greek: Σλίβεν, rarely Σήλυμνος Selymnos; Turkish: İslimye)
  - Kermen (Bulgarian: Кермен; Turkish: Keremenli / Germiyanlı)
  - Kotel (Bulgarian: Котел; Turkish: Kazan)
  - Nova Zagora (Bulgarian: Нова Загора; Greek: Νέα Ζαγορά Nea Zagora; Turkish: Yeni Zağra / Zağra-i Cedid)
- Smolyan (Bulgarian: Смолян; Turkish: Ahiçelebi / Paşmaklı)
  - Borino (Bulgarian: Борино; Turkish: Karabulak)
  - Chavdar (Bulgarian: Чавдар; Turkish: Çavdar)
  - Chepelare (Bulgarian: Чепеларе; Turkish: Çepelli)
  - Devin (Bulgarian: Девин; Turkish: Dövlen / Ropçoz)
  - Dospat (Bulgarian: Доспат; Turkish: Dospat)
  - Madan (Bulgarian: Мадан; Turkish: Maden)
  - Nedelino (Bulgarian: Неделино; Turkish: Uzundere)
  - Rudozem (Bulgarian: Рудозем; Turkish: Palas)
  - Zlatograd (Bulgarian: Златоград; Turkish: Darıdere)
- Stara Zagora (Bulgarian: Стара Загора; Greek: Παλαιά Ζαγορά Palaea Zagora; Turkish: Eski Zağra)
  - Bratya Daskalovi (Bulgarian: Братя Даскалови; Turkish: Burunsuz)
  - Chirpan (Bulgarian: Чирпан; Turkish: Çırpan)
  - Gurkovo (Bulgarian: Гурково; Turkish: Hanköy)
  - Kazanlak (Bulgarian: Казанлък; Turkish: Kızanlık / Kazanlık)
  - Nikolaevo (Bulgarian: Николаево; Turkish: Eşekçi)
  - Radnevo (Bulgarian: Раднево; Turkish: Radne Mahalle)
  - Seuthopolis (ancient city) (Bulgarian: Сефтополис; Greek: Σευθούπολις Sefthoupolis)
  - Shipka (Bulgarian: Шипка; Turkish: Şipka)
  - Tsenovo (Bulgarian: Ценово; Turkish: Şenova)
  - Tulovo (Bulgarian: Тиле / Тилис / Тулово; Greek: Τύλις Tylis; Turkish: Tile)
- Yambol (Bulgarian: Яамбол; Greek: Υάμπολις Yampolis; Turkish: Yanbolu)
  - Bolyarovo (Bulgarian: Болярово; Turkish: Paşaköy)
  - Elhovo (Bulgarian: Елхово; Turkish: Kızılağaç / Çamlık)
  - Kabile (Bulgarian: Кабиле; Turkish: Tavşantepe)
  - Lesovo (Bulgarian: Лесово; Turkish: Urumbeyli)
  - Straldzha (Bulgarian: Стралджа; Turkish: Istralca)
  - Tundzha (Bulgarian: Тунджа; Turkish: Tunca)
  - Boyadzhik (Bulgarian: Бояджик; Turkish: Boyacık)

== Western Thrace (Greece) ==
Cities in Western Thrace:

- Abdera (Turkish: Bulustra)
- Aigeiros (Turkish: Kavaklı)
- Alexandroupoli (Turkish: Dedeağaç; Bulgarian: Дедеагач Dedeagach)
- Amaxades (Turkish: Arabacıköy; Bulgarian: Арбаджикьой)
- Amorio (Turkish: Karabeyli)
- Ano Livera (Turkish: Yukarı Ada)
- Antheia (Turkish: Şahinler)
- Arriana (Turkish: Kozlukebir)
- Arzos (Turkish: Kulaklı / Kulaklı Çiftliği)
- Avato (Turkish: Beyköy / Beyköyü)
- Chrysoupoli (Turkish: Sarışaban)
- Dadia (Turkish: Çalıköy / Çamköy / Çamlıköy / Çam-ı Kebîr / Büyükçam)
- Dafno (Turkish: Mahmutlu)
- Didymoteicho (Turkish: Dimetoka; Bulgarian: Димотика Dimotika)
- Dikaia (Turkish: Kadıköy)
- Echinos (Turkish: Şahin)
- Elaia (Turkish: Deleleşköy)
- Erasmio (Turkish: Taraşmanlı)
- Evlalo (Turkish: İnhanlı)
- Feres (Turkish: Farecik / Ferecik)
- Fillyra (Turkish: Sirkeli)
- Fylakio (Turkish: Seymenli / İnceğiz)
- Galani (Turkish: Çakırlı)
- Genisea (Turkish: Yenice-i Karasu)
- Iasmos (Turkish: Yassıköy)
- Imera (Turkish: Saltuklu)
- Ioniko (Turkish: Hüseyinköy)
- Kalo Nera (Turkish: Meşeli)
- Kastanidis (Turkish: Horozlu)
- Kastanies (Turkish: Çörekköy / Kestanelik)
- Kato Karyofyto (Turkish: Aşağı Kozluca)
- Kato Livera (Turkish: Aşağı Ada)
- Kechros (Turkish: Mehrikoz)
- Kipoi (Turkish: Bahçeköy / Alibeyçiftliği)
- Komara (Turkish: Komarlı / Kumarlı)
- Komnina (Turkish: Kurlar)
- Komotini (Turkish: Gümülcine, Bulgarian: Гюмюрджина Gyumyurdzhina)
- Kotyli (Turkish: Kozluca, Bulgarian: Козлуджа Kozludzha)
- Kyprinos (Turkish: Simavna / Sarı Hızır, Bulgarian: Саръхадър Sarahadar)
- Kyriaki (Turkish: Kayacık)
- Lagyna (Turkish: Çömlekçiköy)
- Lavara (Turkish: Saltıköy / Saltık, Bulgarian: Салтъкьой Saltakyoy or Салтиково Saltikovo)
- Livaditis (Turkish: Hamidiye)
- Loutros (Turkish: Ulucabeyköy)
- Lykodromio (Turkish: Kurtalan)
- Marassia (Turkish: Maraş; Bulgarian: Мараш Marash)
- Maroneia (Turkish: Maronya)
- Mega Dereio (Turkish: Büyük Dervent / Büyük Derebent)
- Metaxades (Turkish: Tokmakköy)
- Mikro Dereio (Turkish: Küçük Dervent / Küçük Derebent)
- Milia (Turkish: Bektaşlı)
- Myki (Turkish: Mustafçova)
- Nea Vyssa (Turkish: Ahırköy)
- Neo Sidirochori (Turkish: Cambaz)
- Orestiada (Turkish: Kumçiftliği, Bulgarian: Орестиада Orestiada)
- Organi (Turkish: Hemetli)
- Ormenio (Turkish: Çirmen; Bulgarian: Черномен Chernomen)
- Paschalia (Turkish: Bayramlı)
- Pentalofos (Turkish: Beştepe)
- Petrota (Turkish: Taşlık)
- Plati (Turkish: Sadırlı / Siderli)
- Protokklisi (Turkish: Başkilise)
- Ptelea (Turkish: Karaağaç)
- Pythio (Turkish: Kuleliburgaz)
- Rizia (Turkish: Dulcaaras / Tufanca-i Ardı)
- Soufli (Turkish: Sofulu)
- Samothrace (Turkish: Semadirek / Semendirek; Bulgarian: Самотраки Samotraki)
- Sapes (Turkish: Şapçı; Bulgarian: Шапчи Şapçi)
- Sideropetra (Turkish: Demirtaş)
- Sostis (Turkish: Susurköy)
- Soufli (Turkish: Sofulu, Bulgarian: Софлу Soflu)
- Spilaio (Turkish: İspitli)
- Stavrochorion (Turkish: Hocalar)
- Stavroupoli (Turkish: Yeniköy, Bulgarian: Кръстополе Krastopole or Еникьой Enikyoy)
- Therapeio (Turkish: Sarıyer)
- Thymaria (Turkish: Köpekli)
- Toxotai (Turkish: Okçular)
- Tychero (Turkish: Bıdıklı)
- Xanthi (Turkish: İskeçe; Bulgarian: Царево Tsarevo / Скеча Skecha)
- Zoni (Turkish: Çavuşköy; Bulgarian: Чаушкьой Chaushkyoy)
