= Tankovo =

Tankovo refers to the following places in Bulgaria:

- Tankovo, Burgas Province
- Tankovo, Haskovo Province
