= Banya, Burgas Province =

Village in Nesebar municipality, Burgas oblast, Bulgaria

Coordinates: 42°46′00″N 27°50′00″E

Banya (Bulgarian: Баня, Greek: Μπάνιο) is a village in southeastern Bulgaria, situated in the Nesebar Municipality of the Burgas Province. It is situated at the foot of the Eastern part of the Balkan Mountains, 6 km from the Black Sea Coast.

Banya is 18 km away from Sunny beach (the largest Bulgarian sea resort), 25 km from the ancient Nesebar and 50 km from Burgas and Varna - the biggest Bulgarian administrative centres on the Black Sea Coast. Within the village itself is a small restaurant and bar, a couple of shops and a hotel. The village hall was recently demolished and is currently in the process of being rebuilt.

The village has been populated by Turkish coal merchants and Greek fishermen until the 1910s. Gradually, the original inhabitants have been evicted and Bulgarian refugees from Asia Minor coast and the Aegean Macedonia moved in.

Irakli, the nearest beach, is one of the last remaining non-commercially developed beaches in Bulgaria. It is a place of unparalleled and unspoilt beauty, a lush fine sandy beach of nearly 4 km, backed by low shrubbery and forest growth.

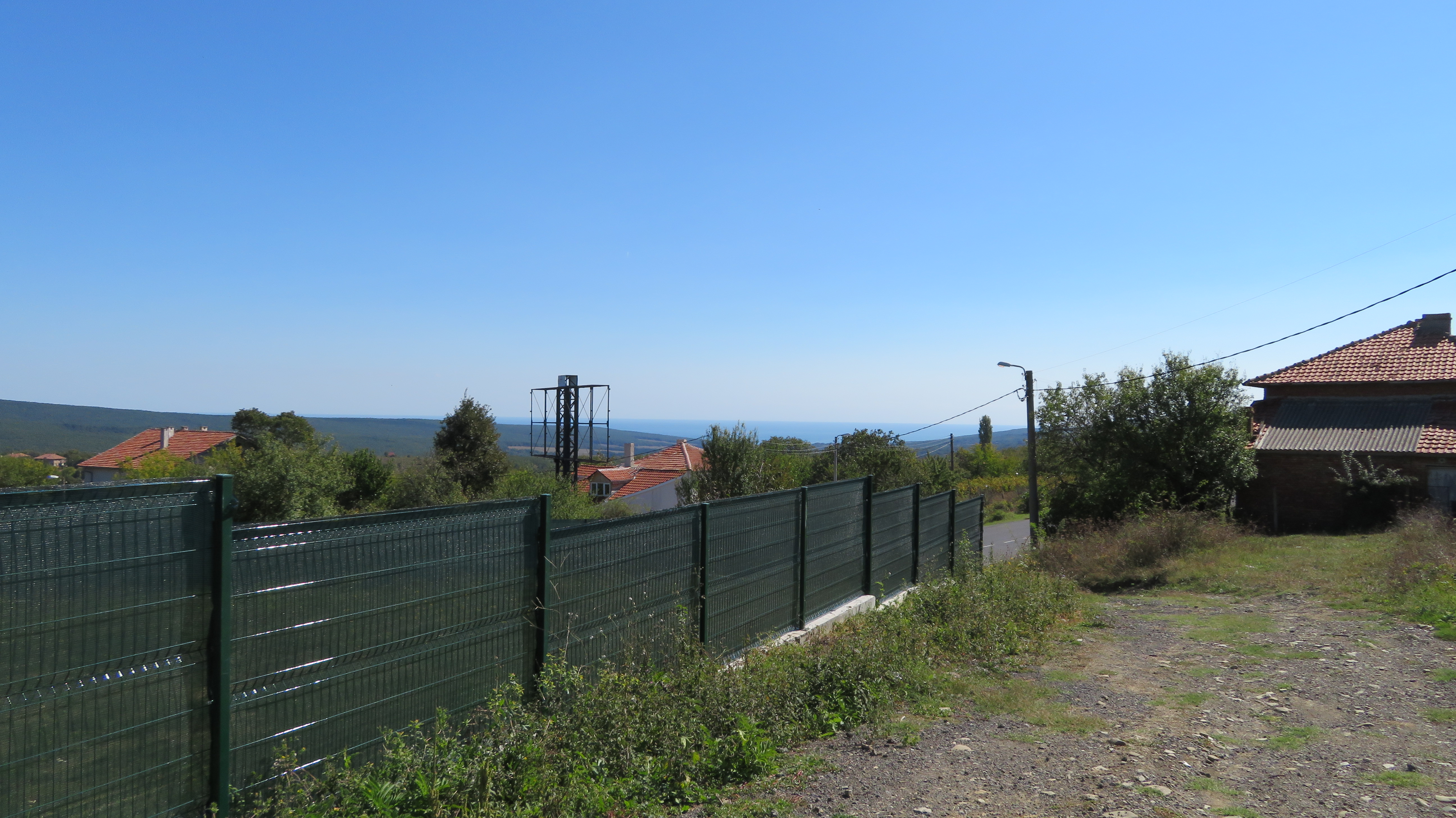
A view from the top of Banya Village looking down to Irakli Beach

Frequented by an 'in-crowd' in the summer months it is largely deserted October to May.

Recently an influx of expats, mainly from the UK, but also some from Germany, The Netherlands and also as far afield as Australia, started shaping a small community - currently numbering about 10 families, some of them permanent settlers.

== Sources ==
- [www.bourgas.org/banya]
