= Ulpia =

Ulpia may refer to:

== People ==
- Ulpia gens, ancient Roman family which produced the emperor Trajan (98–117)

== Places ==
A number of Roman settlements, mostly named in honour of the Emperor Trajan:

- Ulpia Traiana Sarmizegetusa, the capital of Roman Dacia, located near modern Tapae in Romania
- Ulpia Noviomagus Batavorum, modern Nijmegen, Netherlands.
- Colonia Ulpia Traiana, modern Xanten, Germany.
- Civitas Ulpia Sueborum Nicretum, modern Ladenburg, Germany.
- Colonia Ulpia Traiana Poetovio, modern Ptuj, Slovenia.
- Ulpia Serdica, another name for Sofia, the capital of Bulgaria.
- Colonia Ulpia Oescensium or Oescus, near modern Pleven, Bulgaria.
- Colonia Ulpia Ratiaria, near modern Archar, Bulgaria.
- Marcianopolis Ulpia, another name for Marcianopolis, Bulgaria.
- Ulpia Nicopolis, another name for Nicopolis ad Istrum, near modern Veliko Tarnovo, Bulgaria.
- Ulpia Topira, another name for Topeiros, near modern Evlalo, northeastern Greece.
- Colonia Concordia Ulpia Trajana Augusta Frugifera Hadrumetina, another name for Hadrumetum, Tunisia.
- Colonia Marciana Ulpia Traiana Thamugadi, another name for Timgad, Algeria.
- Ulpia Traiana, another name for Leptis Magna
