= Rakovskovo =

- Location within Bulgaria
- Coordinates: 42°49′N 27°45′E
- Country: Bulgaria
- Province: Burgas
- Municipality: Nesebar
- Elevation: 57 m (187 ft)

Population (2024)
  - Total: 79
- Postal code: 8257
- Area code: 0554

Rakovskovo (Bulgarian: Раковсково) is a small village located in the southeast Bulgaria, situated in Obshtina Nessebar, in the Burgas region. It is made up of small farms and summer villas. The village lies in the foothills of the Balkan Mountains, and is within a 15-minute drive to the Black Sea beach town of Obzor. As of 2024, the population of Rakovskovo is 79.The village is named after Georgi Sava Rakovski, a Bulgarian revolutionary and nationalist.
