= Gyulyovtsa =

Village in south-east Bulgaria

Gyulyovtsa Гюльовца
- Village
- Location in Bulgaria
- Coordinates: 42°46′00″N 27°35′58″E
- Country: Bulgaria
- Province: Burgas
- Municipality: Nesebar Municipality

Government
  - Mayor of the village: Zhelyo Zhelev

Area
  - Total: 25.425 km^{2} (9.817 sq mi)
- Elevation: 48 m (157 ft)

Population (2024)
  - Total: 936
  - Density: 36.8/km^{2} (95.3/sq mi)
- Postal code: 8249
- Area code: 055638

Gyulyovtsa (Bulgarian: Гюльовца) is a village in southeastern Bulgaria. It is located in Nesebar Municipality, Burgas Province, at the foothills of the eastern Stara Planina mountain range, near the Poroy Reservoir and the start of the Dyulenski Pass.

The village lies along the old road between Burgas and Varna, 16 km from Sunny Beach, 21 km from Nesebar and 36 km from Burgas.

== Geography ==
Gyulyovtsa is situated in the valley of the Hadjiyska River. To the north lies the forested hill Kaleto, with traces of an ancient fortress. A small waterfall called Siniyat Vir is located a few kilometres north of the village.

== Demographics ==
As of 31 December 2024 the village had an estimated population of 936.

Historical population (Bulgarian censuses):

Year	Population
2001	1,052
2011	1,007
2021	903
