= Priseltsi =

Village in Nesebar, Burgas, Bulgaria

Coordinates: 42°49′00″N 27°49′00″E

Priseltsi - Burgas Province (Bulgarian: Приселци) is a village in South- East Bulgaria, situated in Obshtina Nessebar, in the Burgas region.

Priseltsi is an 8km/10 minute drive from the town of Obzor, a seaside town with much development in progress. It is known for its clean fresh air, rural freedom, clear night skies and unique wildlife and nature.

There are quite a few newly built, modern houses and some older ones in need of repair. A small church has been built and paid for by the local inhabitants, most of which are elderly and all of which are warm and kind-hearted. Pavements are currently being upgraded at the north end of the village.

There is one small shop/café which is only open on certain days and there are always plenty of farm animals running free around the village. A cultural centre has been opened at the north end of the village - its expected to run traditional folk dancing evening and various outdoor activities. There is a small path through a forest on the North-Western side of the village which takes you through sunflower fields, over a bridge and straight into the neighbouring village of Popovich.

It is not uncommon to hear Jackals, hunters or simply silence (bar the crickets) at night here and it is undoubtedly peaceful when compared to nearby Obzor

Local farms sell milk, cheese, eggs, lamb, chicken and on occasion Rakija/Rakia
