= Erasmio =

Topeiros, Xanthi community

Erasmio Εράσμιο
- Community
- Location within Greece
- Coordinates: 40°56′N 24°50′E
- Country: Greece
- Administrative region: Eastern Macedonia and Thrace
- Regional unit: Xanthi
- Municipality: Topeiros

Population (2021)
  - Community: 1,087
- Time zone: UTC+2 (EET)
  - Summer (DST): UTC+3 (EEST)

Erasmio (Greek: Εράσμιο) is a community in the municipality Topeiros in the Xanthi regional unit of Greece. The community consists of the settlements Neo Erasmio, Dasochori and Palaio Erasmio.
