= Emona, Bulgaria =

Village in Burgas, Bulgaria

Emona Емона
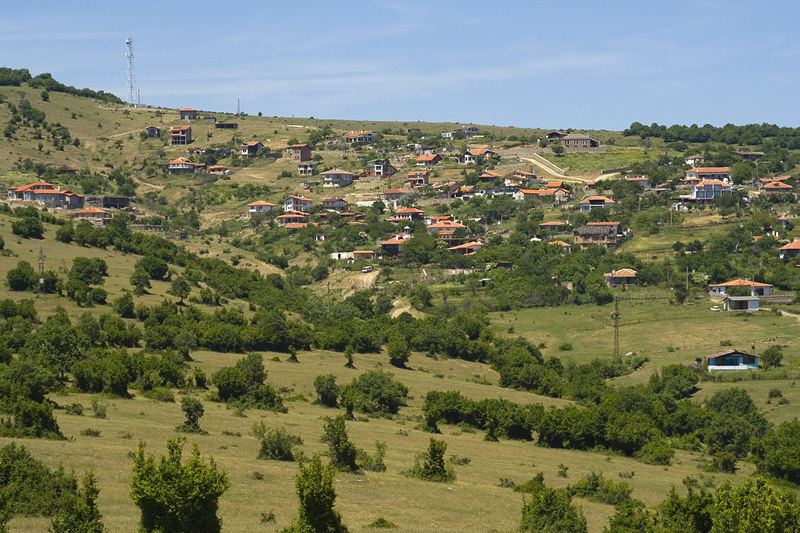
- A view of Emona.

- Location of Emona
- Coordinates: 42°43′N 27°53′E
- Country: Bulgaria
- Province: Burgas
- Municipality: Nesebar Municipality

Population (2024)
  - Total: 30
- Time zone: UTC+2 (EET)
  - Summer (DST): UTC+3 (EEST)
- Postal code: 8252

Emona (Bulgarian: Емона, Greek: Αίμος) is a village and seaside resort in southeast Bulgaria, situated in the Nesebar Municipality of the Burgas Province. The beach Irakli is 5 km from Emona. Emona lies close to Cape Emine. There are ruins of the ancient fortress nearby.
