= Nesebar Municipality =

Coordinates: 42°39′40″N 27°43′6″E

Nesebar Municipality Община Несебър
- Municipality (Obshtina)
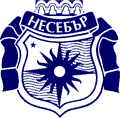
- Coat of arms

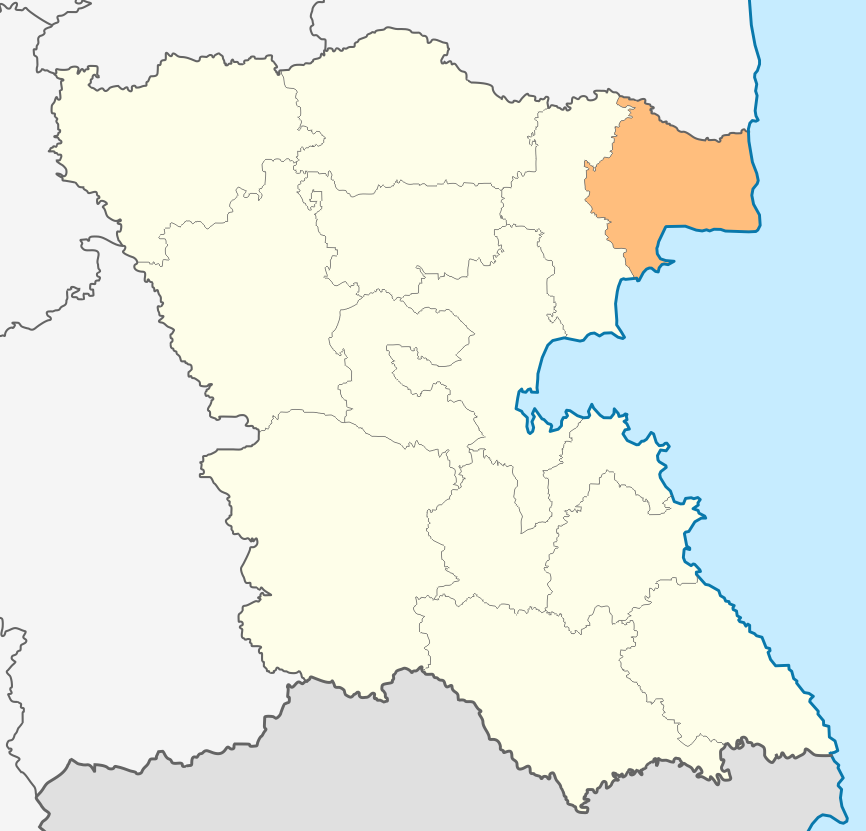
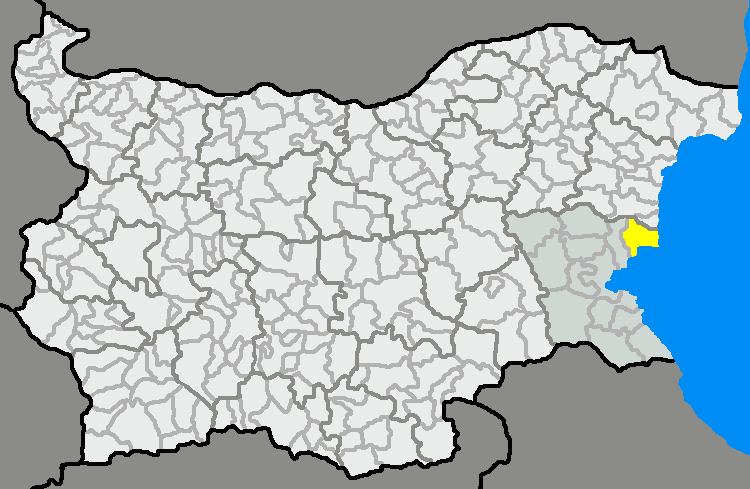
- Location in Burgas province Location on map of Bulgaria
- Country: Bulgaria
- Province (Oblast): Burgas
- Seat: Nesebar

Area
  - Total: 420.44 km^{2} (162.33 sq mi)

Population
  - Total: 29,333
  - Density: 69.767/km^{2} (180.70/sq mi)
- Time zone: UTC+2 (EET)
  - Summer (DST): UTC+3 (EEST)

Nesebar Municipality (Bulgarian: Община Несебър, Obshtina Nesebar) is a Bulgarian municipality comprising the northern part of the Black Sea coast of Burgas Province, Bulgaria. Its northern border is with the municipalities of Byala and Dolni Chiflik, its western border — with the municipality of Pomorie, and its eastern border is the Black Sea. Proximity to an international airport, as well as the long coastline and its diverse character create favourable conditions for the development of tourism. It is now the most popular tourist destination in the Balkan Peninsula and one of the most popular in Europe. There are 150 hotels with 70,000 beds, 35,000 beds in private accommodation, more than 1000 cafés and restaurants. The municipal centre is Nesebar, located 20 km from Burgas International Airport.

== Towns and villages ==
The municipality consists of 3 towns and 11 villages:

=== Towns ===
- Nessebar
- Sveti Vlas
- Obzor

=== Villages ===
- Banya
- Gyulyovtsa
- Emona
- Koznitsa
- Kosharitsa
- Orizare
- Panitsovo
- Priseltsi
- Ravda
- Rakovskovo
- Tankovo

== Demographics ==
=== Religion ===
According to the latest Bulgarian census of 2011, the religious composition, among those who answered the optional question on religious identification, was the following:

Religious composition of Nesebar Municipality
Orthodox Christianity	83.3%
Catholicism	0.6%
Protestantism	1.0%
Islam	4.3%
No religion	3.3%
Prefer not to answer, others and unidentifiable	7.5%
