= Evlalo =

Evlalo Εύλαλο
- Community
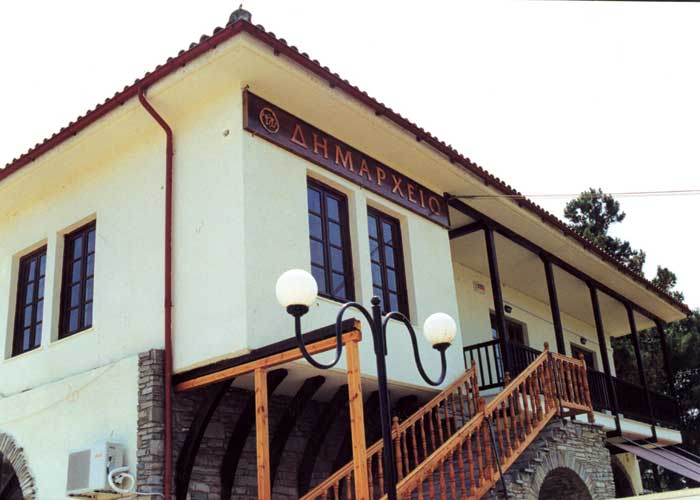

- Location within Greece
- Coordinates: 40°58′52″N 24°48′04″E
- Country: Greece
- Administrative region: East Macedonia and Thrace
- Regional unit: Xanthi
- Municipality: Topeiros
- Municipal unit: Topeiros

Population (2021)
  - Community: 4,032
- Time zone: UTC+2 (EET)
  - Summer (DST): UTC+3 (EEST)

Evlalo (Greek: Εύλαλο; Turkish: İnhanlı) is a village and a community in the Xanthi regional unit of Thrace, Greece. The municipal seat of Topeiros, it is located 23 kilometers south-southwest of the city of Xanthi. In 2021, the population was 4,032 for the community. The community consists of the villages Evlalo, Dekarcho, Iliokentima, Kremasti, Kyrnos, Mikrochori, Orfani and Palaio Olvio.
