= Kosharitsa =

Village in Nesebar municipality, Bulgaria

Coordinates: 42°45′N 27°42′E

Kosharitsa (Bulgarian: Кошарица) is a village in southeastern Bulgaria, near Bulgaria's Black Sea coast. It is in Nesebar Municipality of Burgas Province.
