= Panitsovo =

Panitsovo Паницово
- Village
- Location within Bulgaria
- Coordinates: 42°50′N 27°40′E
- Country: Bulgaria
- Oblast: Burgas
- Opština: Nesebar

Government
  - Mayor (Municipality): Nikolay Dimitrov (Ind.)

Area
  - Total: 26.451 km^{2} (10.213 sq mi)
- Elevation: 345 m (1,132 ft)

Population (2024)
  - Total: 111
  - Density: 4.20/km^{2} (10.9/sq mi)
- Postal code: 8254
- Area code: 0554
- Vehicle registration: A

Panitsovo (Bulgarian: Паницово) is a village in South-East Bulgaria, situated in Obshtina Nessebar, in the Burgas region.
