= Leivaditis =

Leivaditis, Λειβαδίτης is a Greek surname. Notable people with the surname include:

- Tasos Leivaditis (1922–1988), Greek poet
- Thanos Leivaditis (1934–2005), Greek actor and screenwriter

== See also ==
- Ioannis Leivatidis
