= Sveti Vlas =

Sveti Vlas Свети Влас
- Resort
- Saint Vlas
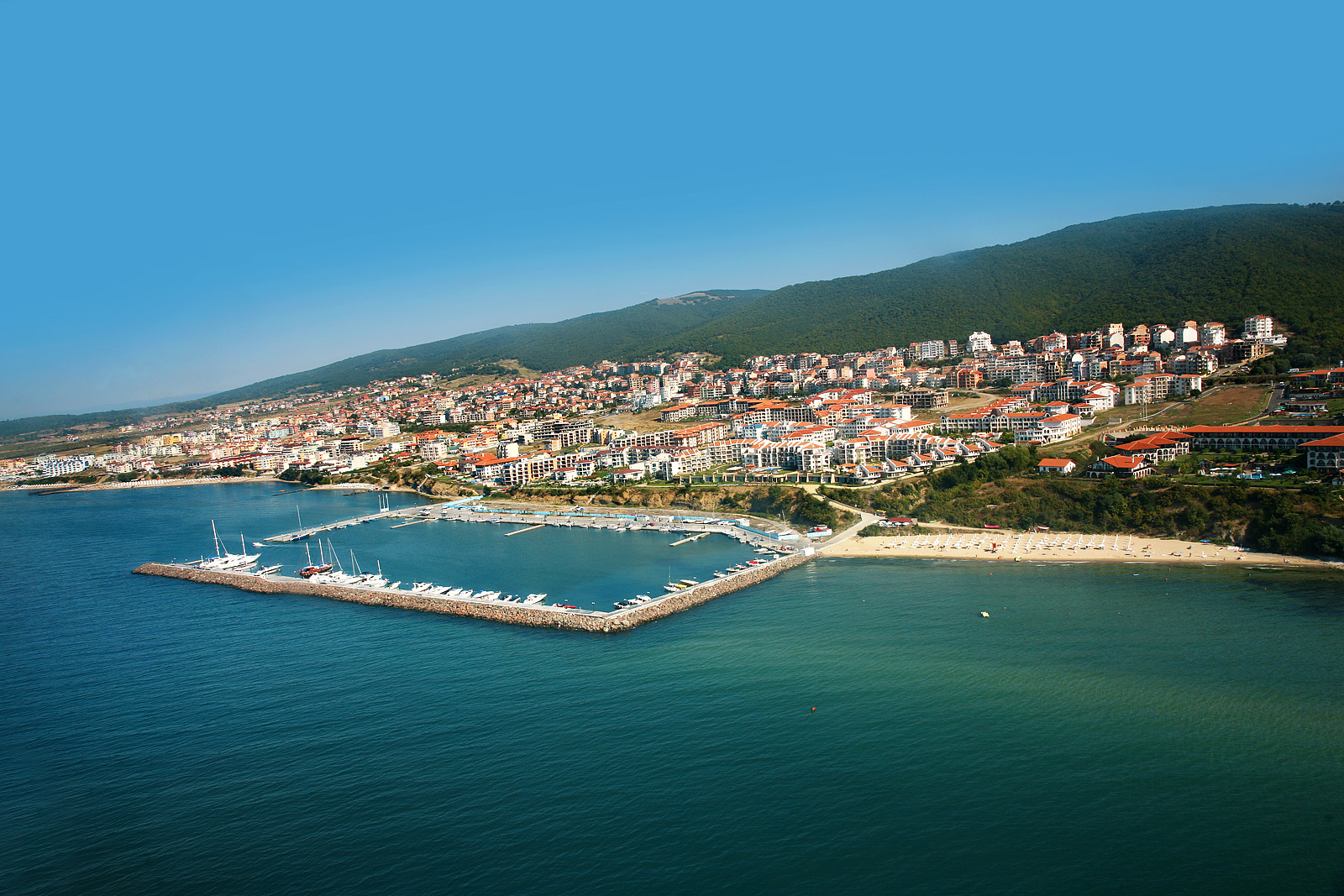
- Sveti Vlas with the Dinevi Marina

- Location of Sveti Vlas within Bulgaria
- Coordinates: 42°43′N 27°46′E
- Country: Bulgaria
- Province: Burgas
- Municipality: Nesebar

Government
  - Mayor: Ivan Nikolov (Independent)
- Elevation: 0 m (0 ft)

Population (2022)
  - Total: 3,960
- Time zone: UTC+2 (EET)
  - Summer (DST): UTC+3 (EEST)
- Postal Code: 8256
- Area code: 0554

Sveti Vlas (also known as St. Vlas; Bulgarian: Свети Влас; Greek: Άγιος Βλάσιος), is a town and resort on the Black Sea coast in Nesebar municipality, Burgas Province, Bulgaria. In July, 2007 its population was 3,869.

== History ==
The town is located at the foot of the southern slopes of the Balkan Mountains, in the northern part of Burgas Bay. A settlement was founded at the present place of Sveti Vlas in the 2nd century AD by Thracians and Greeks, possibly Larissa (Λάρισα), though this site is more likely to be at Cape St. Athanasius. It acquired the name Sveti Vlas in the 14th century after Saint Blaise, a monastery dedicated to whom existed in the region, but was burnt down in the 14th-18th century by consecutive pirate raids. During the Ottoman rule of Bulgaria, it was known as Kücük manastir or simply Manastir ("monastery" in Bulgarian), while the name Sveti Vlas became official after 1886.

== Tourism ==
Sveti Vlas has grown as a tourist resort in recent times, serving as a quieter alternative to nearby Sunny Beach. The gap between the two places is shrinking as more hotels and holiday apartments are built along the coast. Sveti Vlas lies at the northern end of a bay which has Sunny Beach in its middle and the ancient town of Nesebar at its southern end. Sunny Beach and Nesebar are easily accessible by bus or taxi, and there are also boats going between Sveti Vlas and Nesebar.

The resort was mainly popular amongst inland Bulgarian tourists, but recently there is rapid growth in the number of foreign tourists, mainly from Russia, but also from Great Britain, Poland, Romania and Scandinavia. Even though Sveti Vlas was heavily developed in 2000's it remained pretty quiet and calm down place, making it good place to have a rest. Due to that fact the typical visitors in the resort are families with children.

The latest development of the area has been the building of the Dinevi marina, the largest in Bulgaria. The Dinevi brothers have been developing the area with numerous complexes, highlighted by the marina itself. The latest development being worked on is Complex Admiral, due to be completed in 2016. The beach was expanded in 2007-2009 using rocks and sand that was removed when digging out for the marina. The marina with its clubs and restaurants has become famous among the wealthier people in Bulgaria, and expensive cars like Ferraris and Porsches can frequently be seen.

== Gallery ==
Sveti Vlas, photo taken from the boat from Nesebar

One of the beaches

One of the beaches

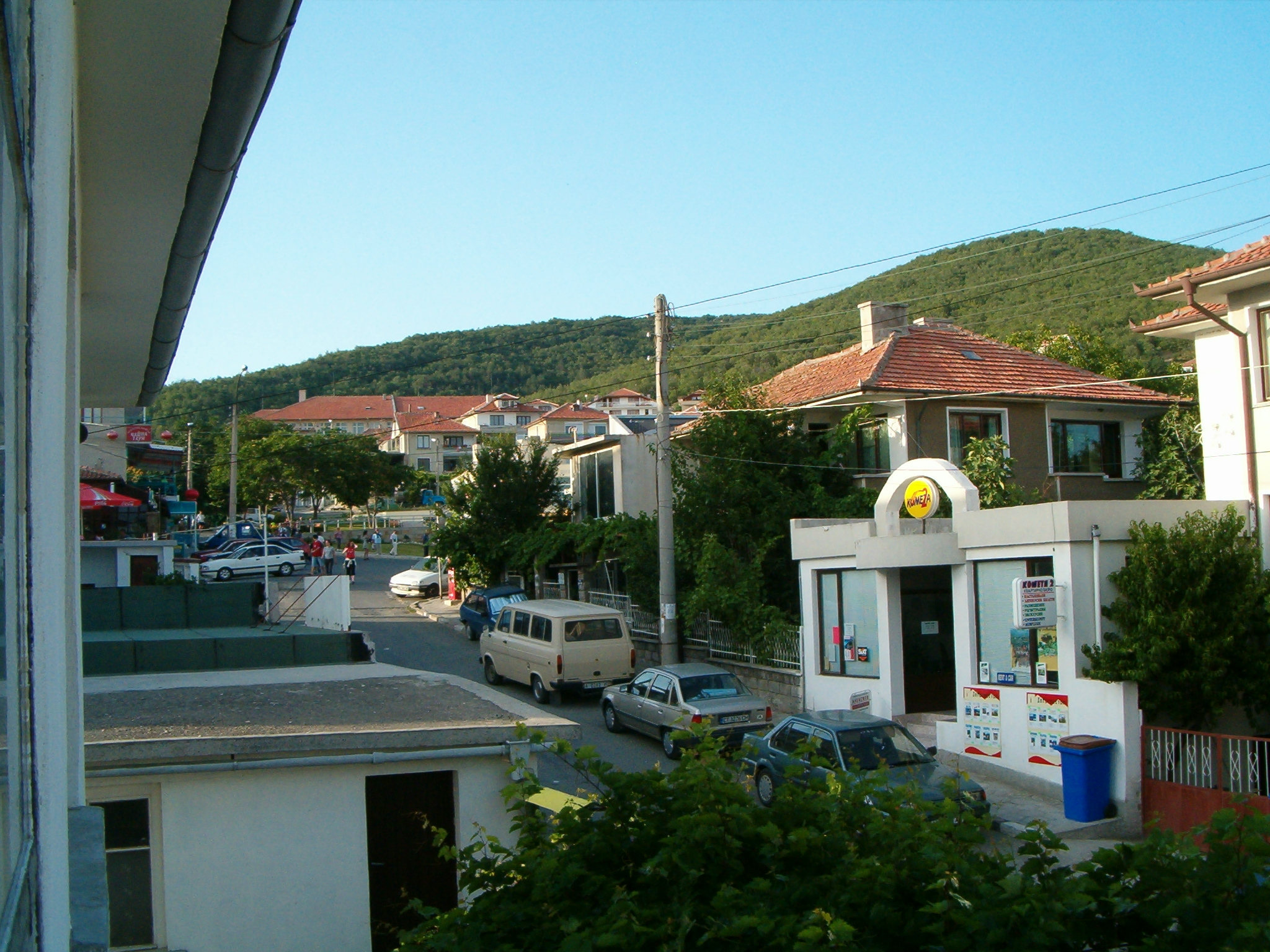
Centre of Sveti Vlas with the tourist office

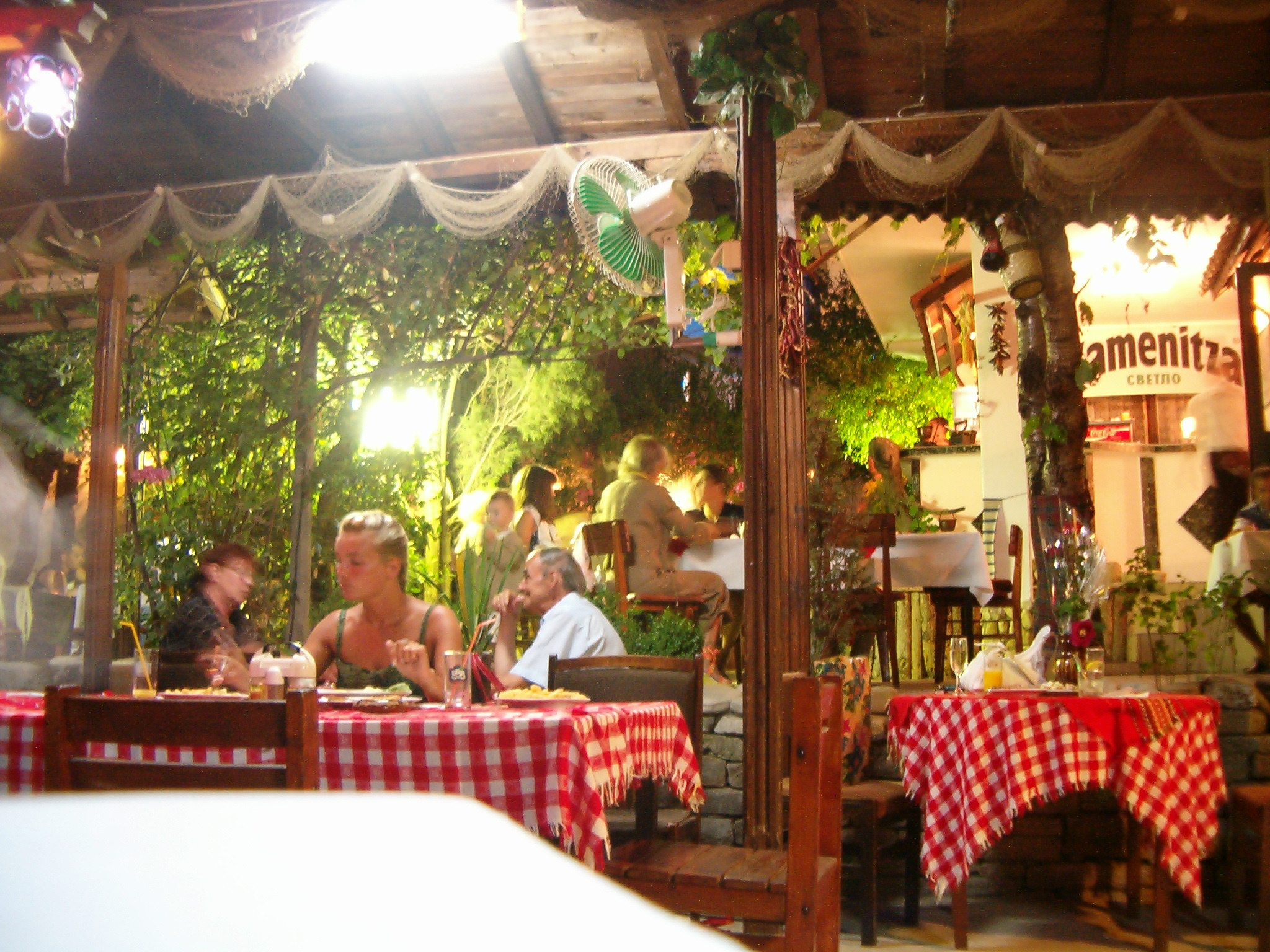
A restaurant in the centre of Sveti Vlas

Cars outside a restaurant on the Dinevi Marina

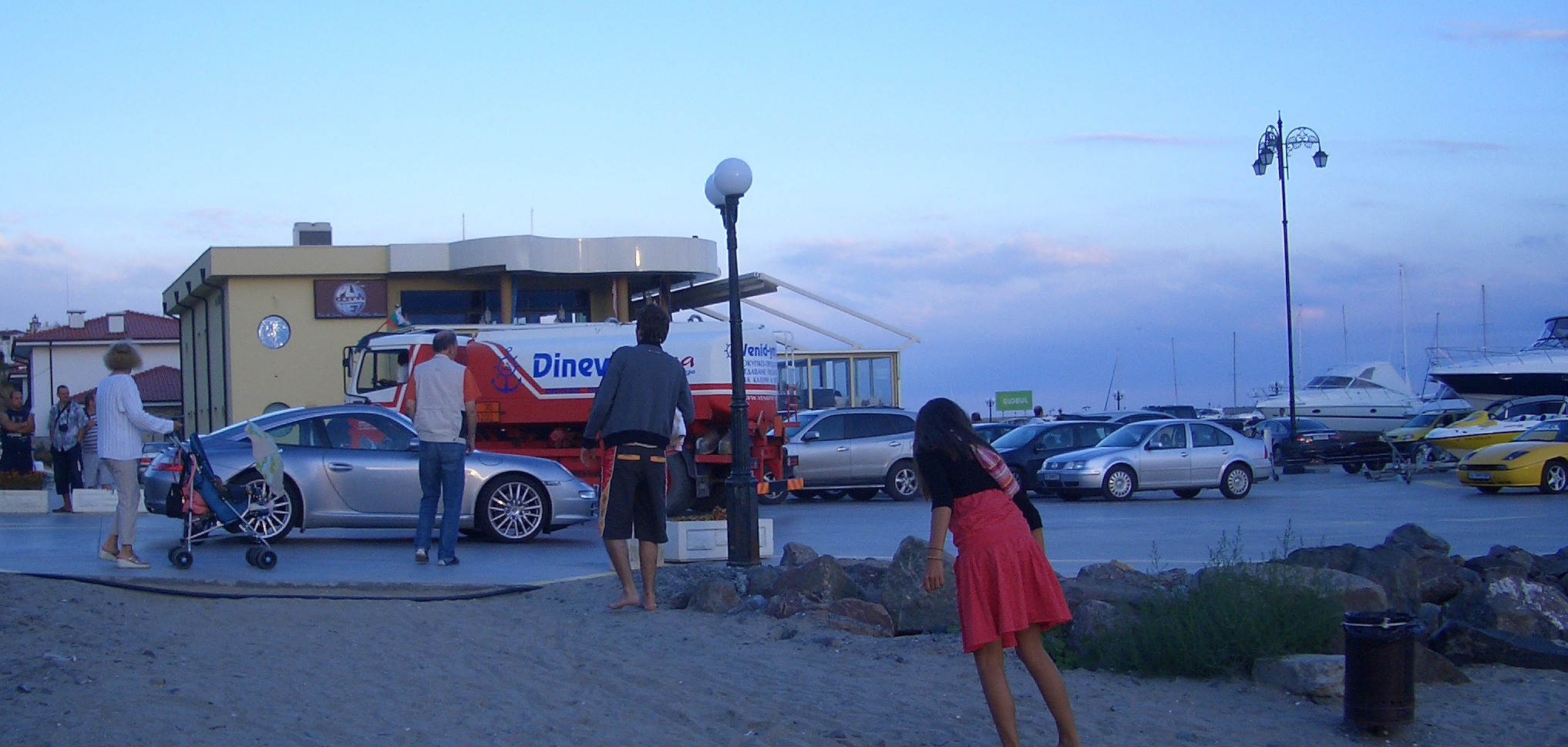
The Dinevi Marina

The beach with the marina in the background
