= Orizare =

Bulgarian village

Orizare Оризаре
- Location of Orizare
- Coordinates: 42°45′N 27°37′E
- Country: Bulgaria
- Provinces (Oblast): Burgas

Government
  - Mayor: Nedelcho Nedialkov
- Elevation: 26 m (85 ft)

Population (2005)
  - Total: 1,442
- Time zone: UTC+2 (EET)
  - Summer (DST): UTC+3 (EEST)
- Postal Code: 8248
- Area code: 055438
- License plate: B

Orizare (Bulgarian: Оризаре) is a village in southeast Bulgaria, situated in Obshtina Nessebar, in the Burgas region.
