= Koznitsa (village) =

Village in Burgas, Bulgaria

Koznitsa Козница
- Location of Koznitsa
- Coordinates: 42°52′N 27°41′E
- Country: Bulgaria
- Province (Oblast): Burgas
- Municipality (Obshtina): Nesebar

Government
  - Mayor: Nikolay Dimitrov
- Elevation: 101 m (331 ft)

Population (2005)
  - Total: 11
- Time zone: UTC+2 (EET)
  - Summer (DST): UTC+3 (EEST)
- Postal Code: 8255
- Area code: 0554
- License plate: B

Koznitsa (Bulgarian: Козница) is a village in south-eastern Bulgaria, situated in the Nesebar Municipality of the Burgas Province.
