= Sunny Beach =

Sunny Beach Слънчев бряг
- Resort
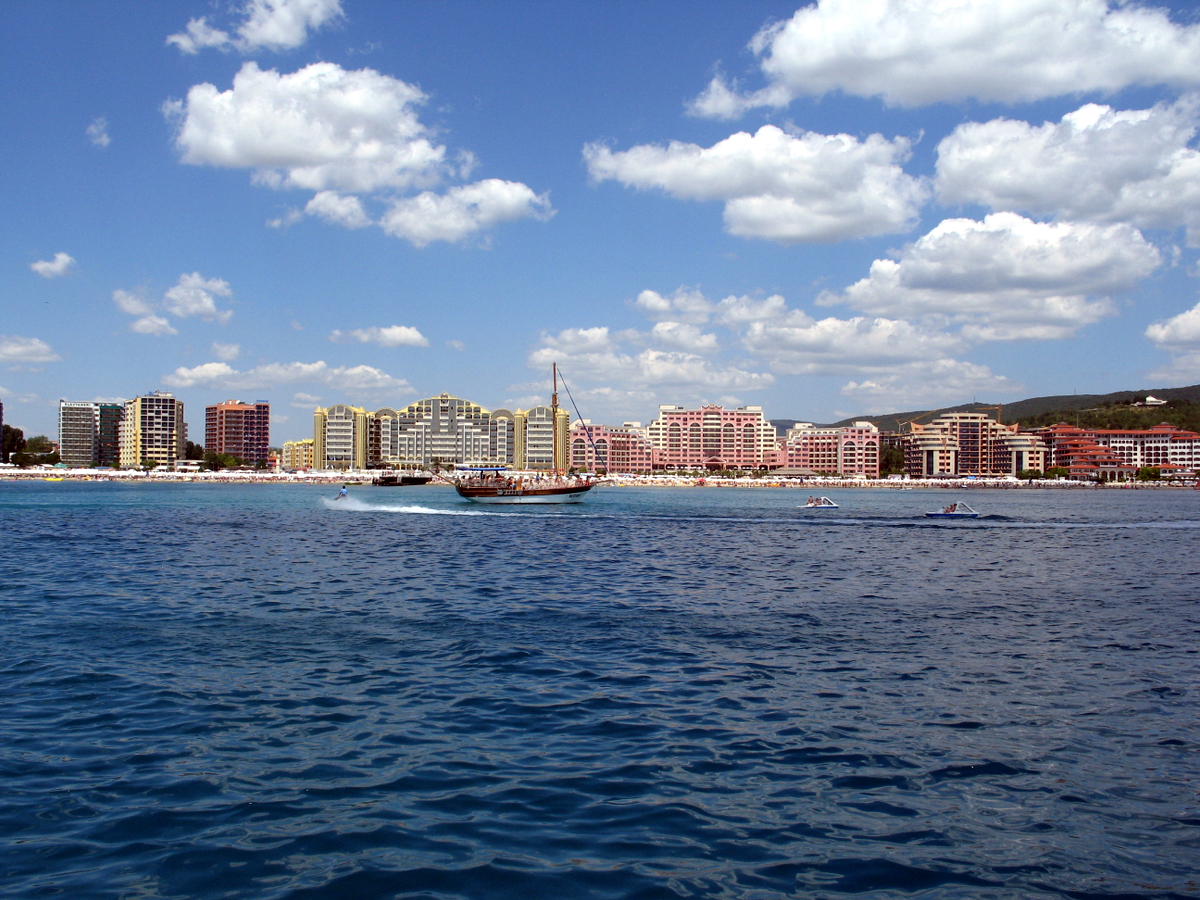
- View from the sea

- Location of Sunny Beach
- Coordinates: 42°41′35″N 27°42′30″E
- Country: Bulgaria
- Province (Oblast): Burgas

Government
  - Mayor: Nikolay Dimitrov (Independent)
- Elevation: 0 m (0 ft)
- Time zone: UTC+2 (EET)
  - Summer (DST): UTC+3 (EEST)
- Website: www.sunnybeach.com

Sunny Beach (Bulgarian: Слънчев бряг [ˈsɫɤnt͡ʃɛf brʲak], Slanchev bryag) is a seaside resort on the Black Sea coast of Bulgaria, 35 km (22 mi) north of Burgas and 94 km (58 mi) south of Varna.

Created in 1958 as a weekend getaway for Bulgarian families, Sunny Beach has become the largest tourist and vacation spot in the country. Today, the area contributes a significant part of the province's annual gross domestic product. Initially a small beachside resort, it has grown to include a large variety of recreational activities and services, gambling establishments as well as sports and music venues.

Its rapid growth makes it the largest resort on the entire Black Sea coast; to the south, the complex has merged with the town of Nesebar.

== Tourism ==
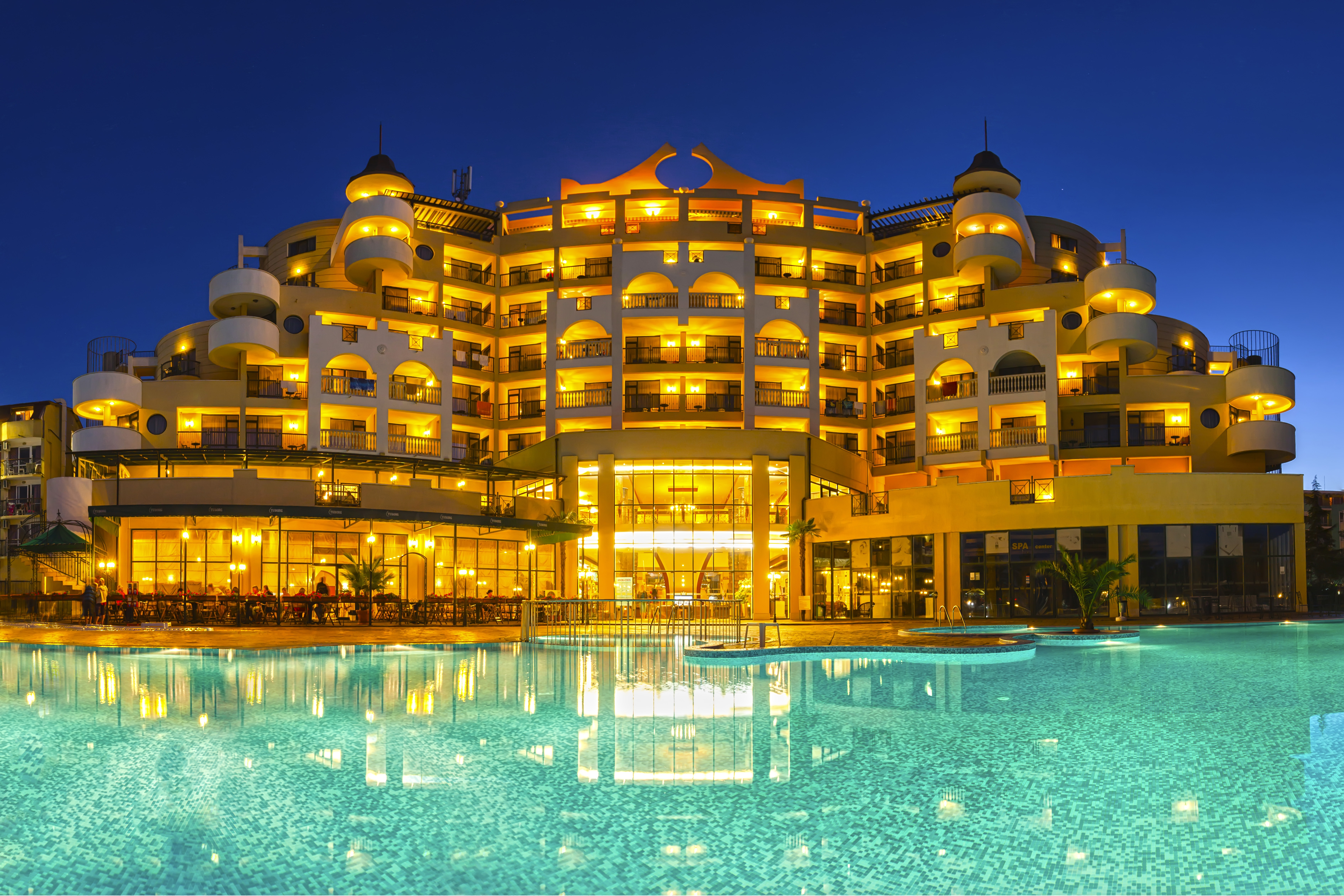
Hotel Imperial Bulgaria Sunny Beach

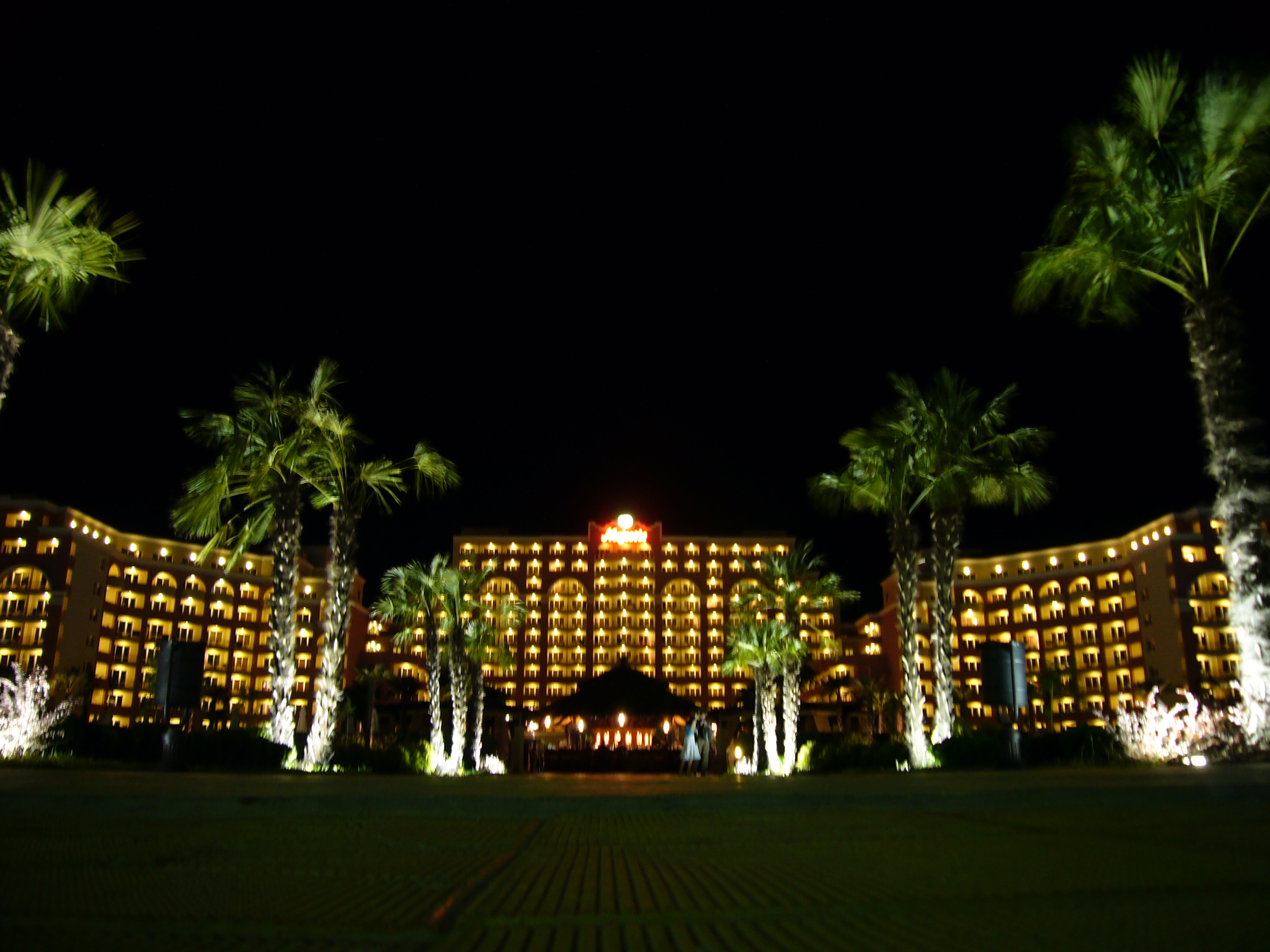
Hotel Majestic at night

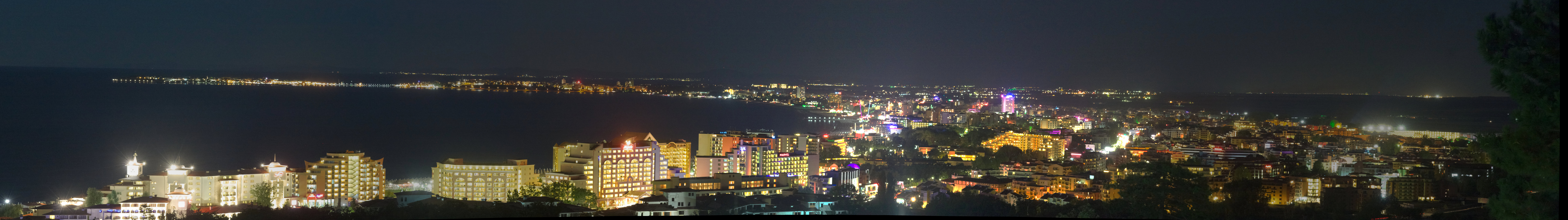
Sunny Beach at night

Sunny Beach has a very small permanent population, but during the summer the resort is home to many thousands of tourists. The main strip of high-rise hotels backing onto the beach is 5 km (3 mi) long and extends along a wide bay between Sveti Vlas and Nessebar, soon to connect with the village of Tankovo.

=== History ===
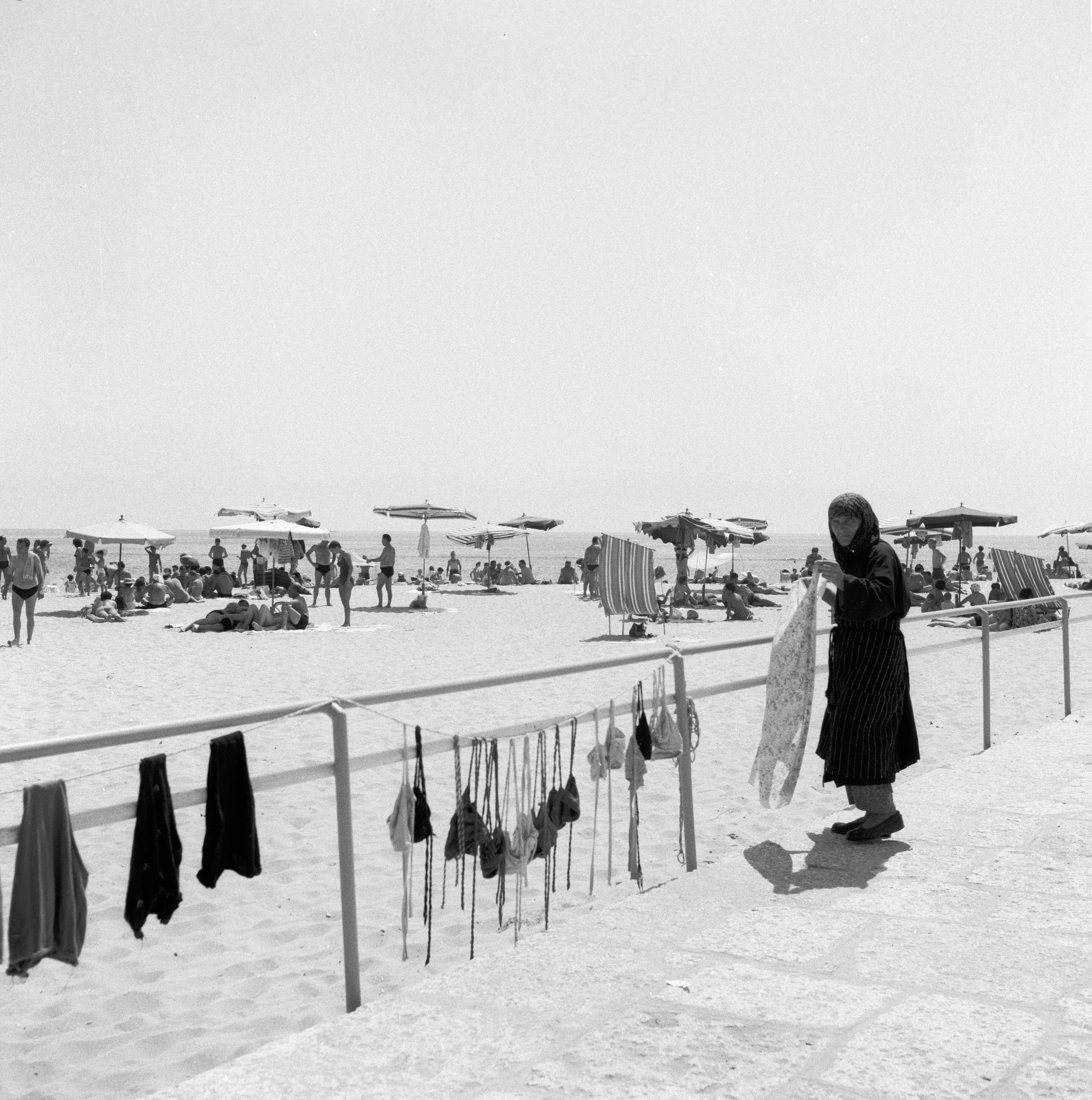
Sunnybeach in 1963. Photo by Mediterranean Sea traveler and writer Göran Schildt

The planning of Sunny Beach began in 1957, and construction began with decree No 120/30 June 1958 of the Council of Ministers of the People's Republic of Bulgaria. The construction of Sunny Beach began north of the Nessebar Strait in an area that geographers have long called the small Nessebar desert - endless sands that form dunes, including two wells of geraniums. From these two wells, a kilometer away from the town, the inhabitants of the peninsula drank water.

On June 1, 1959, the first restaurant, "Neptune", was opened.

During the afforestation of Sunny Beach, 550,000 m³ of fertile soil were transferred to the territory of the complex, 300,000 coniferous and deciduous large-sized trees were planted, 770,000 ornamental shrubs, 100,000 roses, 200,000 dunes, with investments exceeding BGN 150 million.

Sunny Beach is the first Bulgarian resort to be awarded the Blue Flag eco award, erected by a beach ritual in front of the Europe Hotel on July 4, 1995.

The millionth tourist of the complex was registered on September 22, 1969. The two millionth tourist of the complex was registered on August 30, 1973. The five millionth tourist was registered on June 15, 1981. Official statistics show that for the period 1959 - 1988 7 699 100 people were vacationing in Sunny Beach, of which 5 162 600 were foreign tourists and 2 536 590 Bulgarian citizens. In 1989 it has 108 hotels with over 27,000 beds and over 130 restaurants, attractions and public places, night clubs, bars and discos, coffee shops and aperitifs. Sunny Beach EAD was a 100% state-owned joint-stock company until March 14, 1994, when it was announced for privatization by the Privatization Agency. On July 16, 1997, after the sale by the state of 25% of the company's capital through the first wave of mass privatization, the name of the issuer was changed to Sunny Beach AD.

Sunny Beach was selected as one of the Top 100 Beaches in the world in 2024, according to the prestigious Golden Beach Award, which highlights destinations renowned for their beauty, vibrant atmosphere, inclusivity, community spirit, and cultural significance.

== Transport ==
The airports serving Sunny Beach are Burgas Airport and Varna Airport. Sunny Beach has established itself as one of the largest socio-economic centers in Eastern Bulgaria. The resort is connected with the cities of Varna, Burgas, and Sofia through numerous bus lines.

== Attractions ==
Attractions for tourists include the beach, water sports, and the nearby historic site of Nessebar. There are two water parks near the resort and third to be built soon near the exit to Kosharitca. The Decade of Symphonic Music, part of the International Folklore Festival, fashion shows, and various beach competitions are held in Sunny Beach. The Golden Orpheus song contest was held here until 1999.

== Climate ==
Sunny Beach has a Hot-summer Mediterranean climate (Köppen climate classification Csa; Trewartha climate classification Cs). Average annual temperatures is around 14 °C. During the summer the sea temperatures stay around 26 °C. Winters are cool, windy and have moderate rainfall.

Climate data for Sunny Beach, Bulgaria (2000-2020)
Month	Jan	Feb	Mar	Apr	May	Jun	Jul	Aug	Sep	Oct	Nov	Dec	Year
Mean daily maximum °C (°F)	8.2 (46.8)	10.3 (50.5)	13.4 (56.1)	17.6 (63.7)	23.8 (74.8)	27.2 (81.0)	31.2 (88.2)	30.8 (87.4)	26.5 (79.7)	21.3 (70.3)	15.2 (59.4)	12.1 (53.8)	20.1 (68.2)
Daily mean °C (°F)	5 (41)	5 (41)	8 (46)	12 (54)	19 (66)	23 (73)	26 (79)	26 (79)	21 (70)	16 (61)	11 (52)	7 (45)	15.8 (60.4)
Mean daily minimum °C (°F)	1.9 (35.4)	3.1 (37.6)	5.7 (42.3)	9.5 (49.1)	14.3 (57.7)	18.0 (64.4)	21.5 (70.7)	21.6 (70.9)	17.4 (63.3)	12.9 (55.2)	8.3 (46.9)	3.8 (38.8)	11.2 (52.2)
Average precipitation mm (inches)	44.3 (1.74)	47.6 (1.87)	48.2 (1.90)	69.8 (2.75)	49.9 (1.96)	32.1 (1.26)	27.6 (1.09)	28.4 (1.12)	45.5 (1.79)	62.2 (2.45)	68.9 (2.71)	57.1 (2.25)	581.6 (22.90)
Average relative humidity (%)	82	78	75	76	76	74	71	72	72	77	80	81	76
Mean monthly sunshine hours	95	112	158	184	275	317	356	337	247	203	118	101	2,503
Source 1: Climatebase.ru
Average sea temperature	9 (48)	7 (45)	8 (46)	12 (54)	18 (64)	24 (75)	26 (79)	27 (81)	24 (75)	19 (66)	14 (57)	11 (52)	17 (62)
Source 2: Holiday Check

== Media ==
The BBC has broadcast the programme Booze, Bar Crawls and Bulgaria: Stacey Dooley Investigates. This focussed on the negative aspects of the Sunny Beach resort such as excessive drinking, overpriced private medical treatment and the availability of illegal drugs.

The UK's Channel 4 have commissioned Dragonfly Film and Television Productions to film three episodes of the next series of What Happens in Sunny Beach, Bulgaria. The show portrays the activities of Britons who escape their mundane lives to enjoy the lawlessness of Sunny Beach.

In 2022, Channel 4 also commissioned Parable to produce the six-part documentary series Emergency on Sunny Beach, covering how local emergency services and frontline workers handle the summer peak in tourists, and what they think of the British tourists. The series was broadcast in 2023.

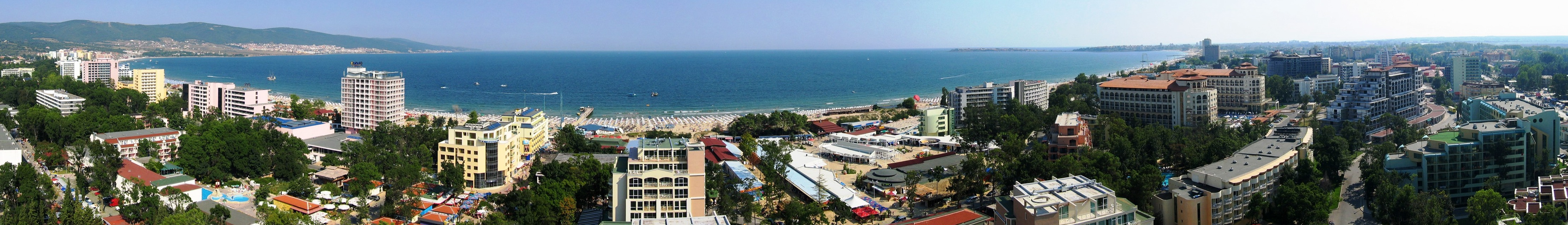
View from hotel Kuban in 2005

== Gallery ==
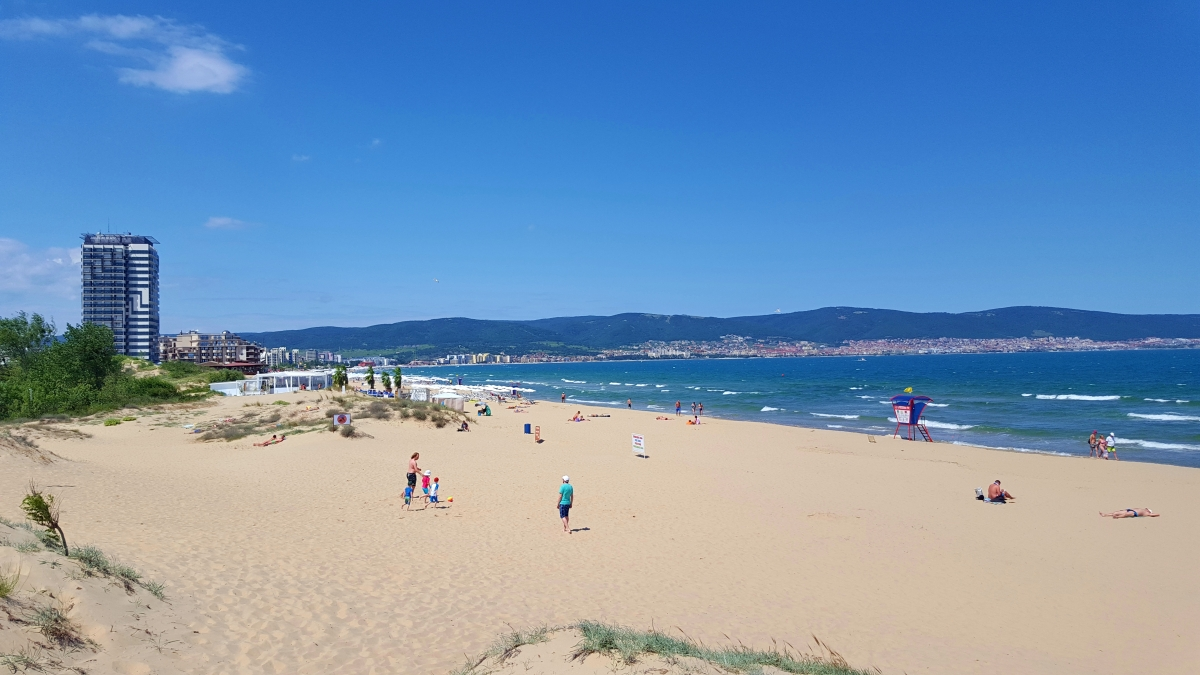

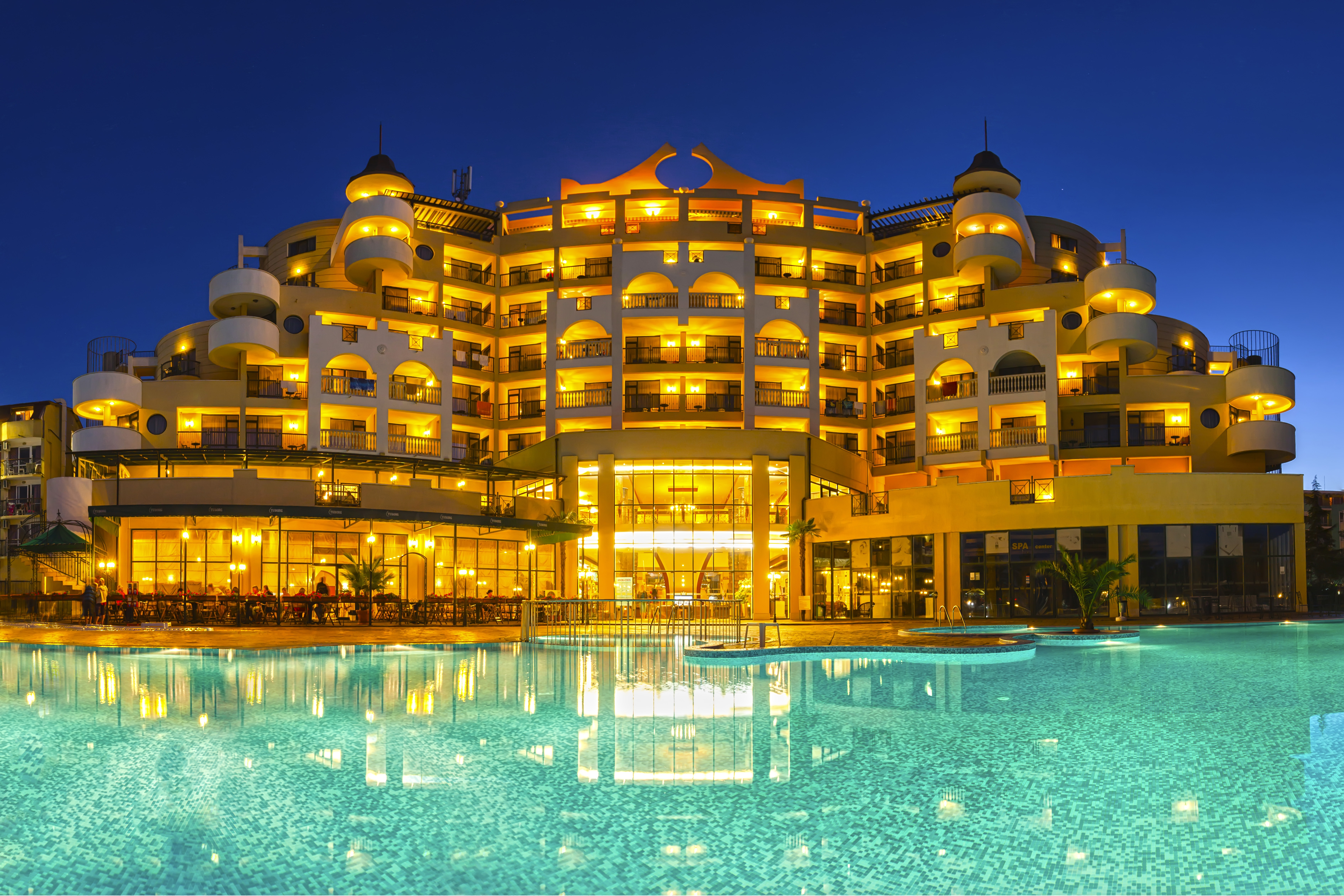

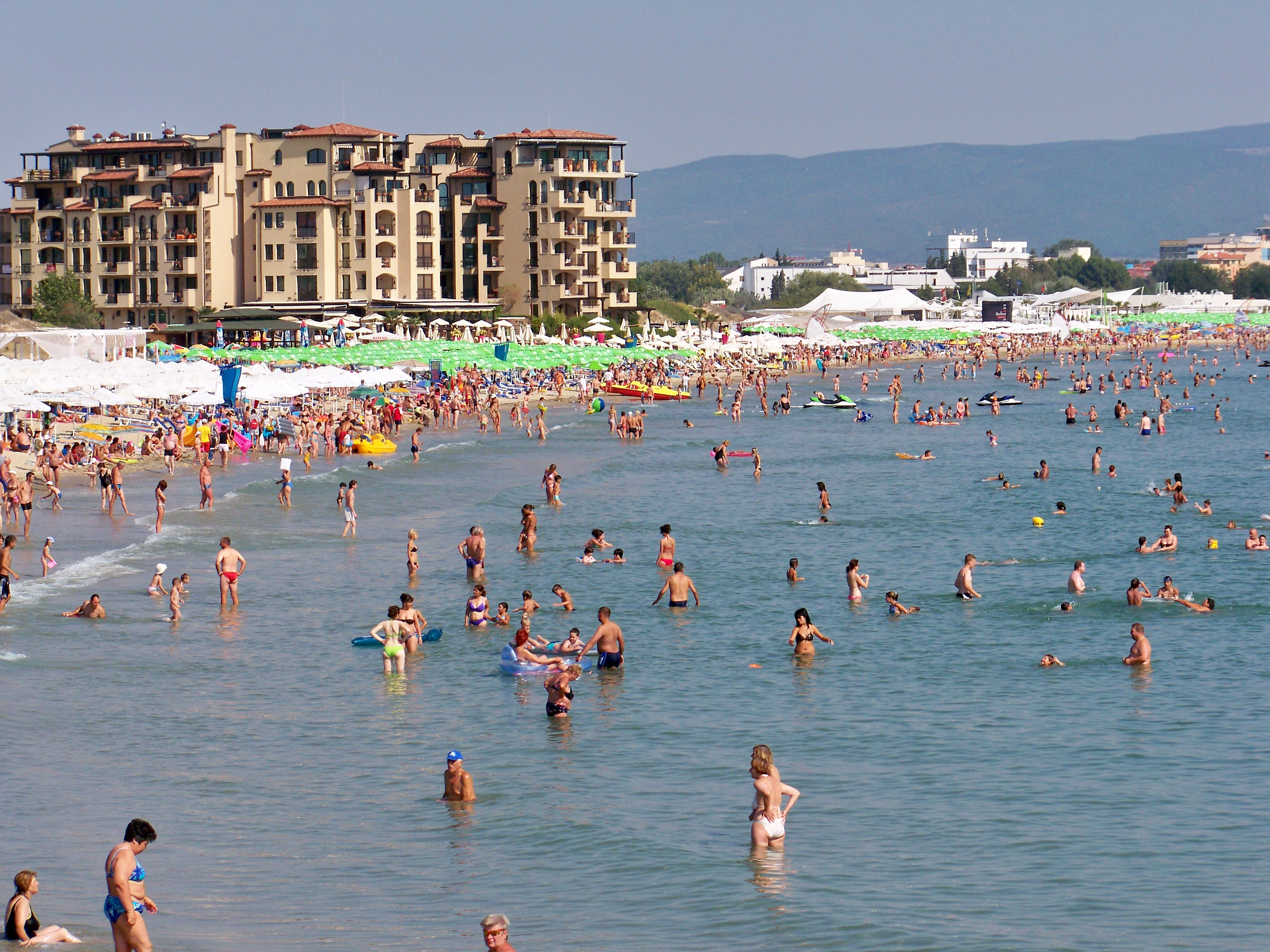

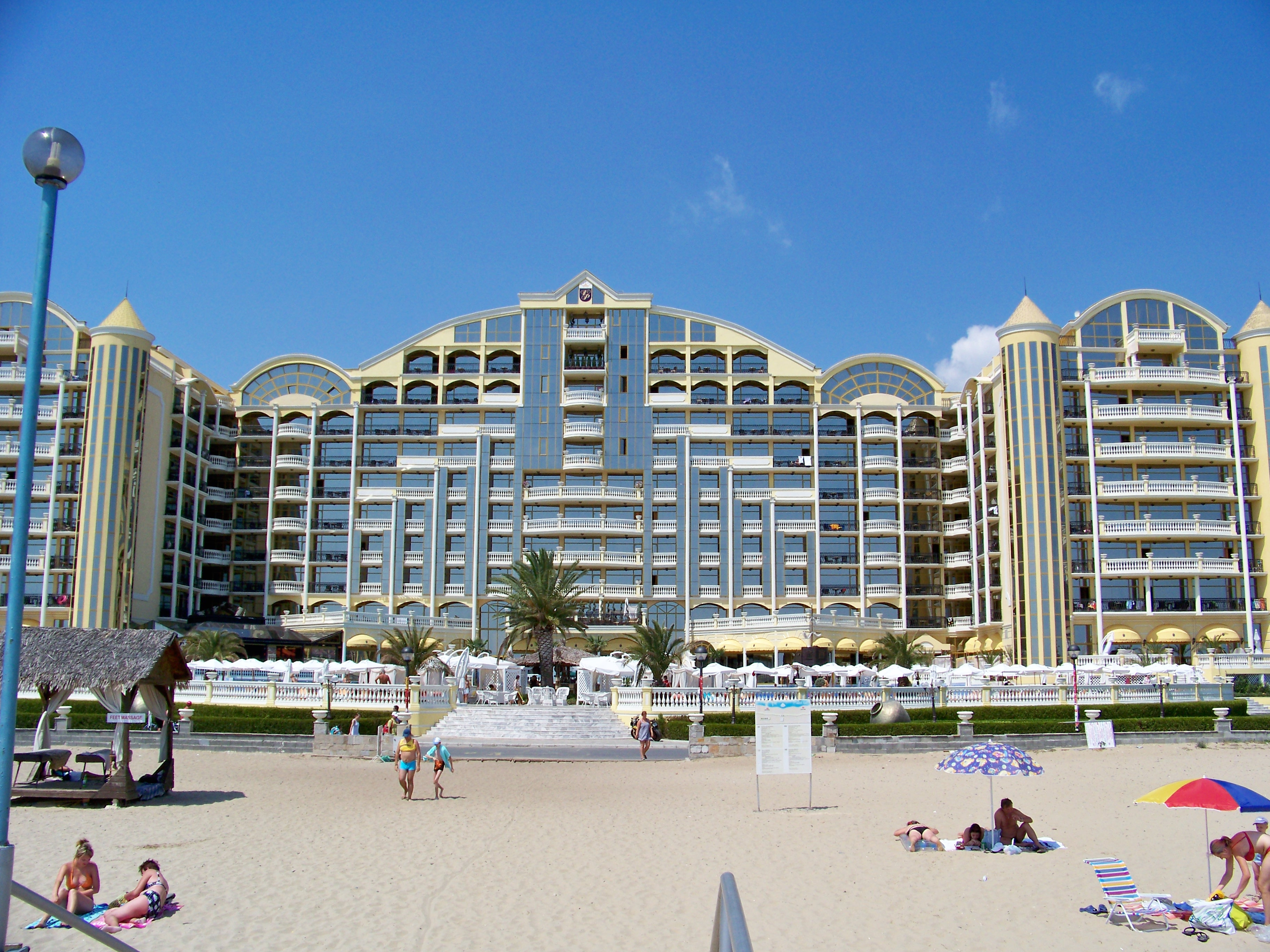

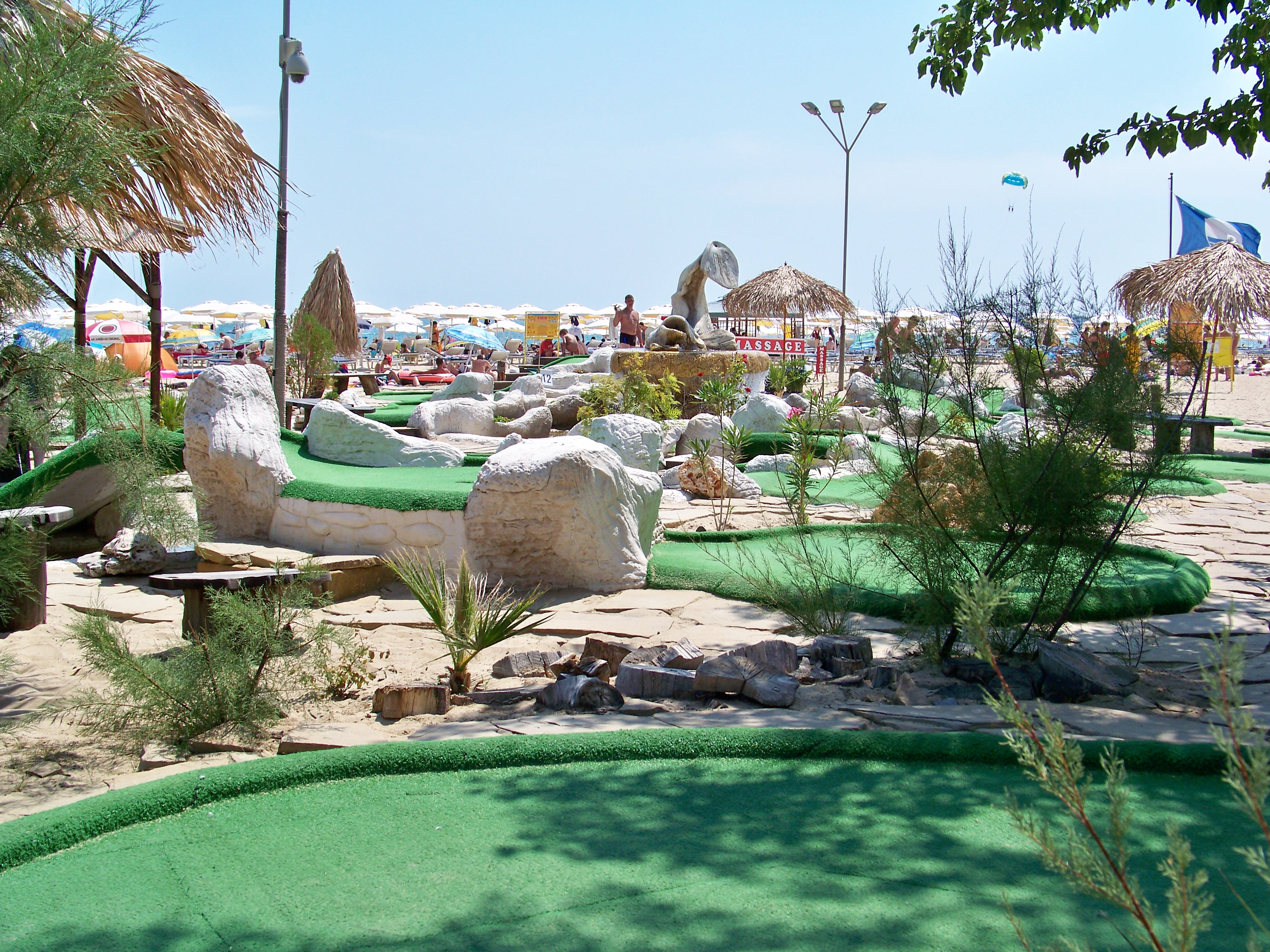

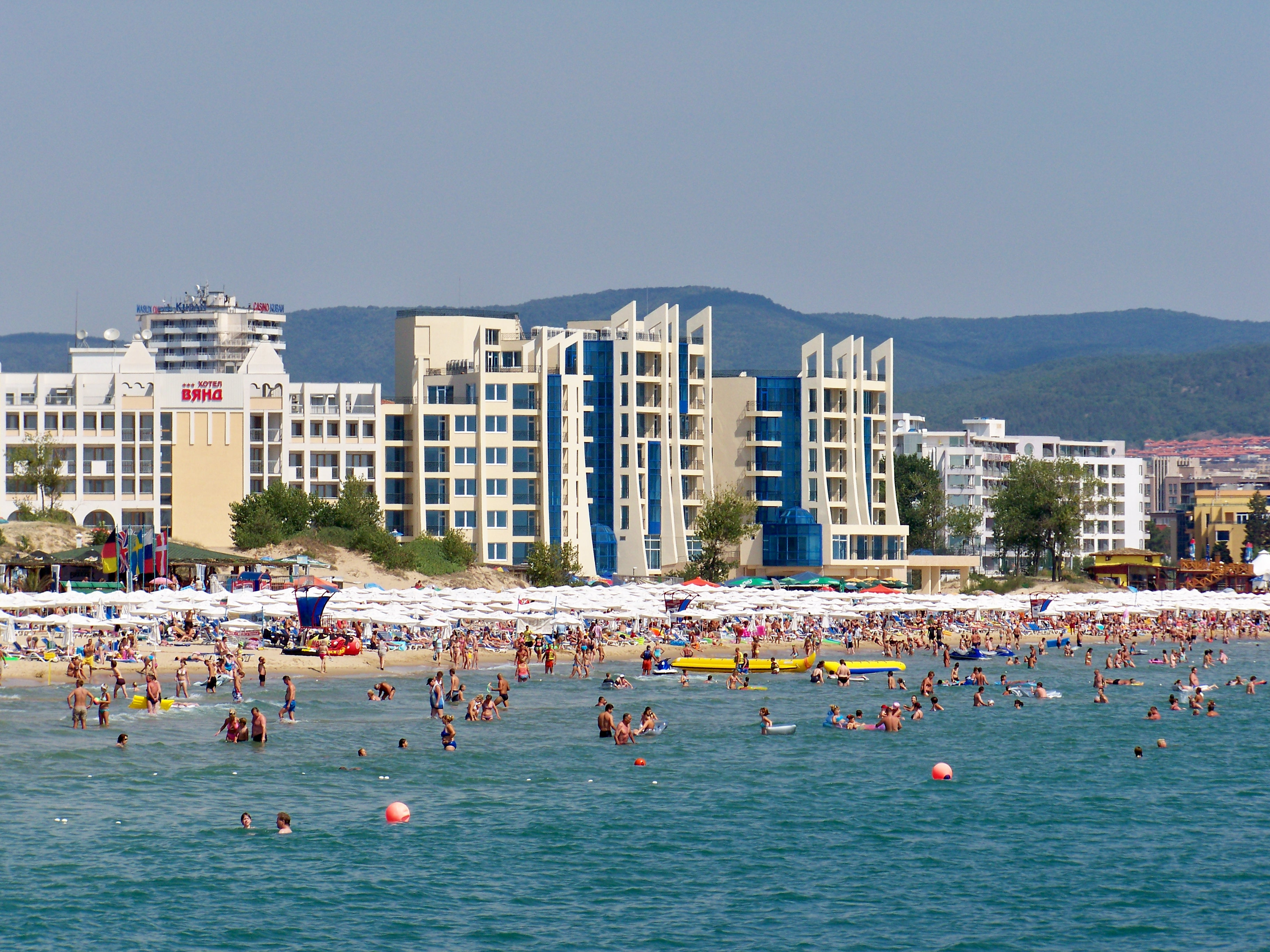

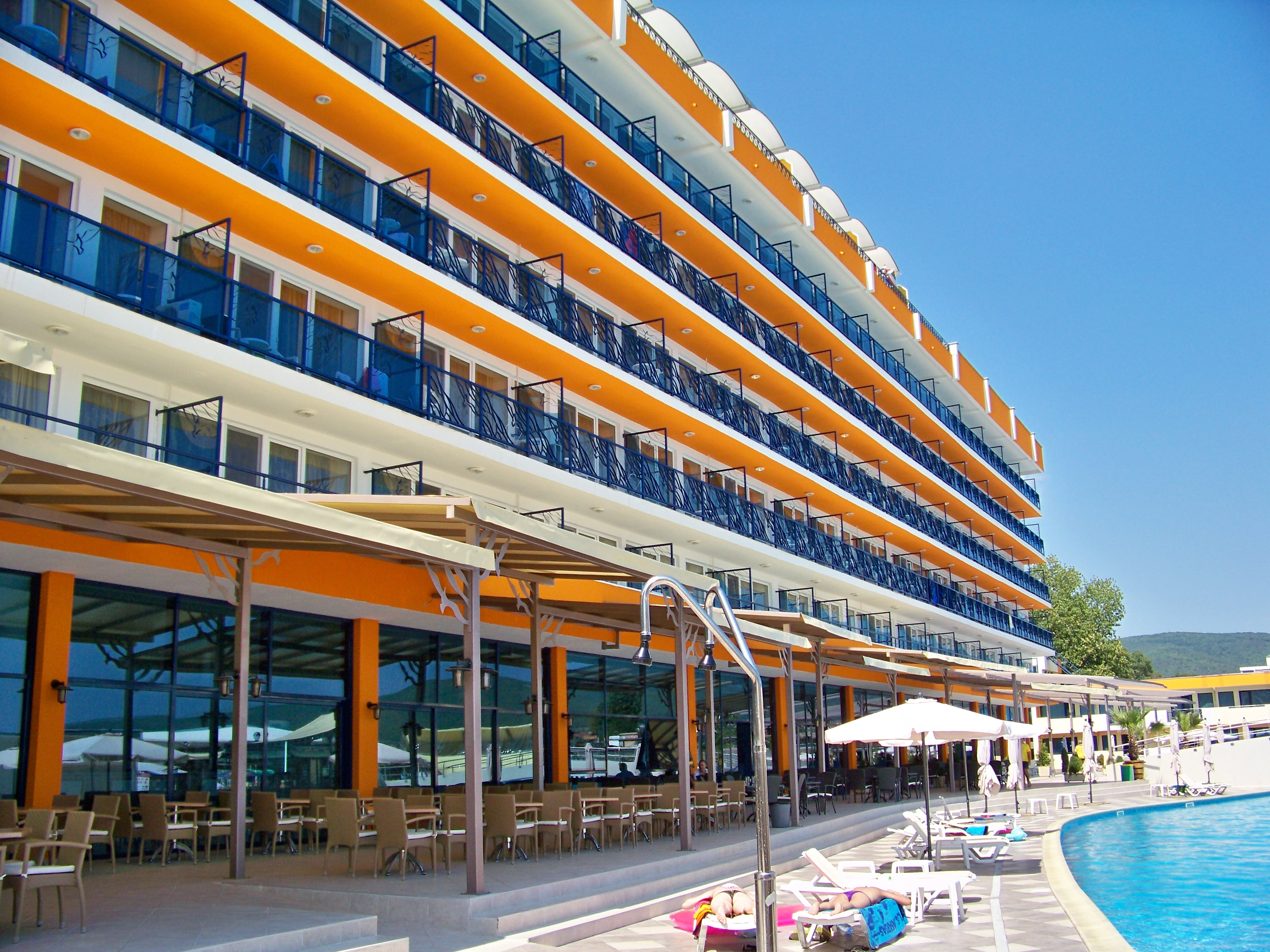

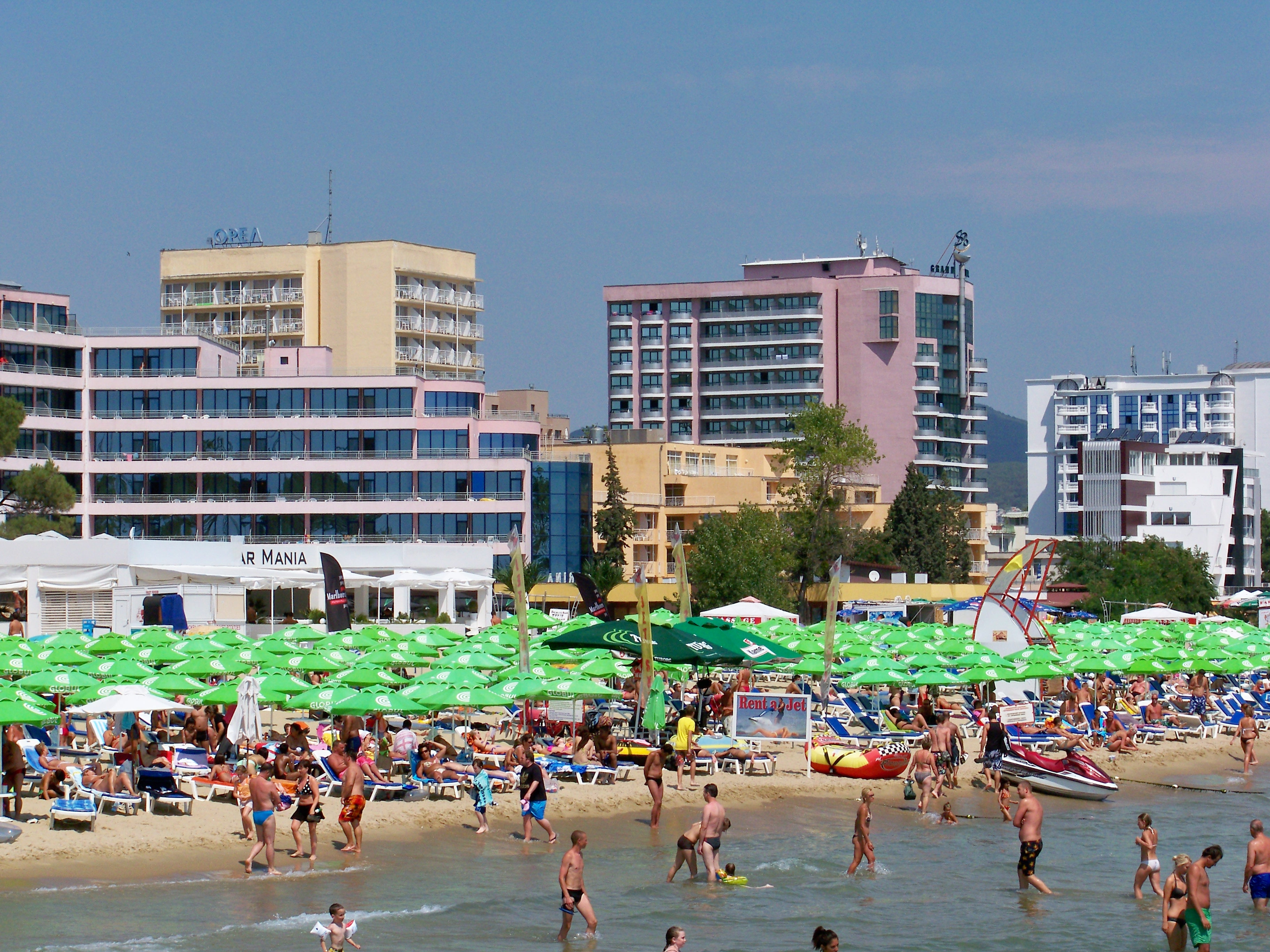

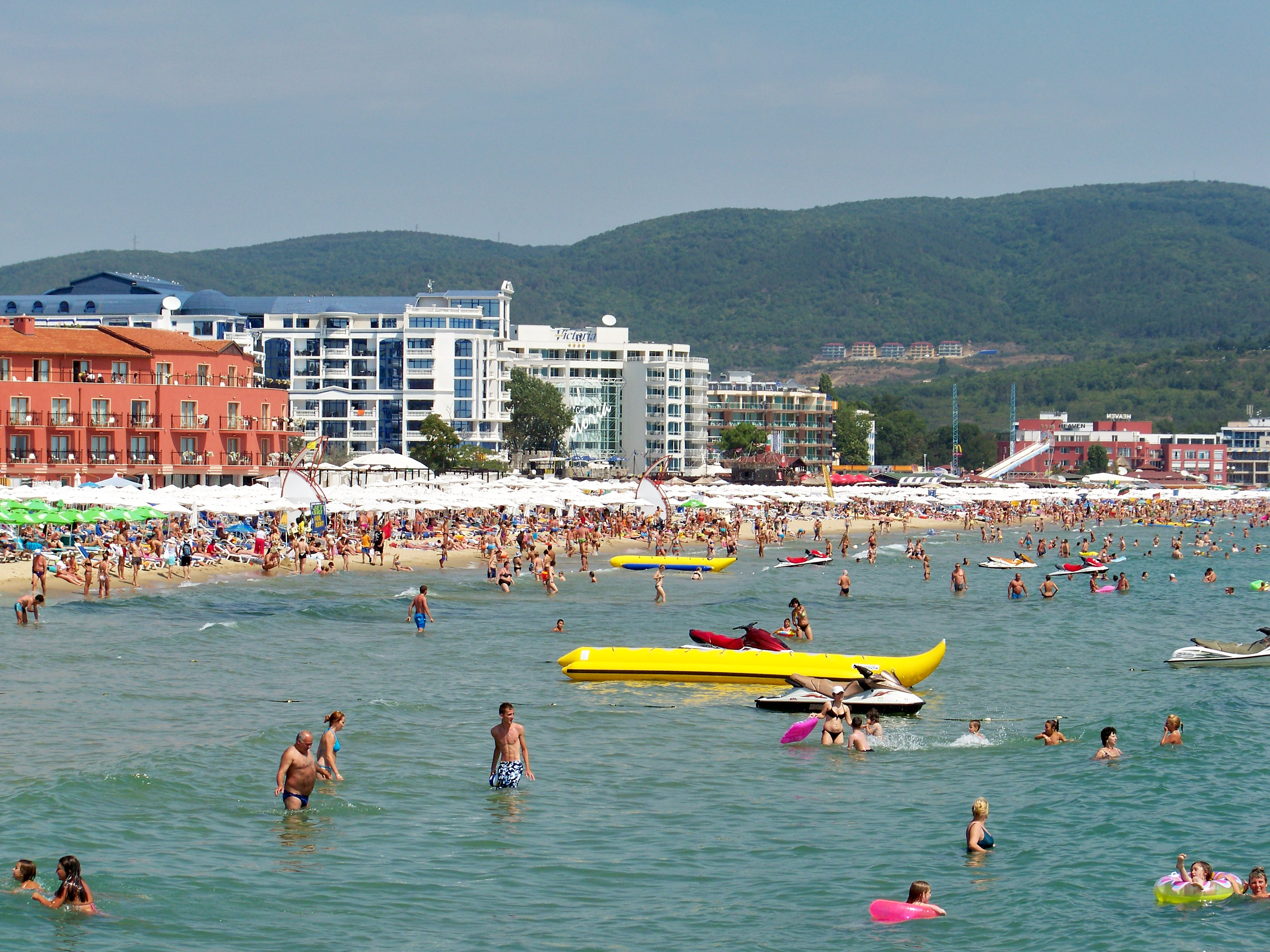

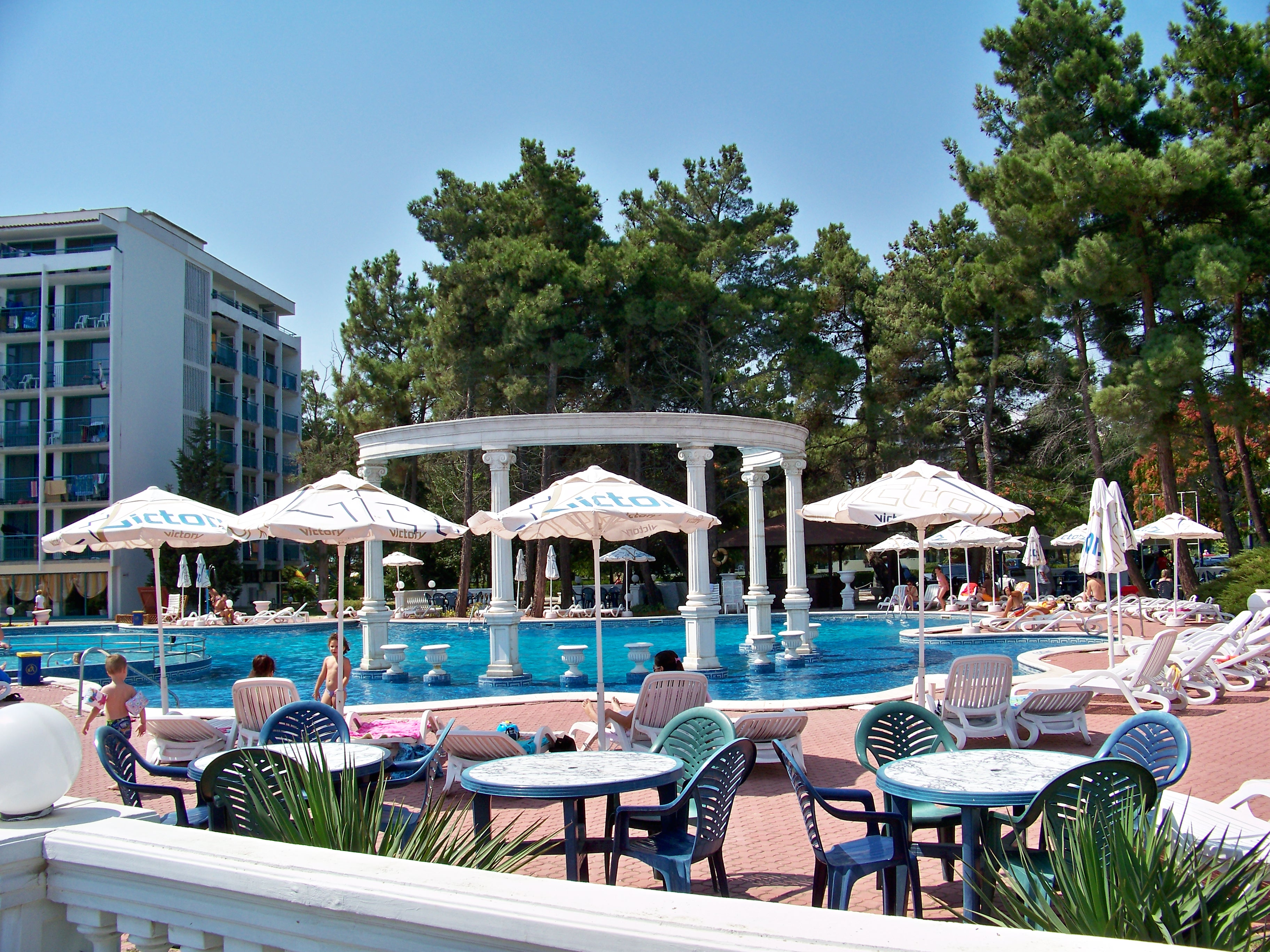

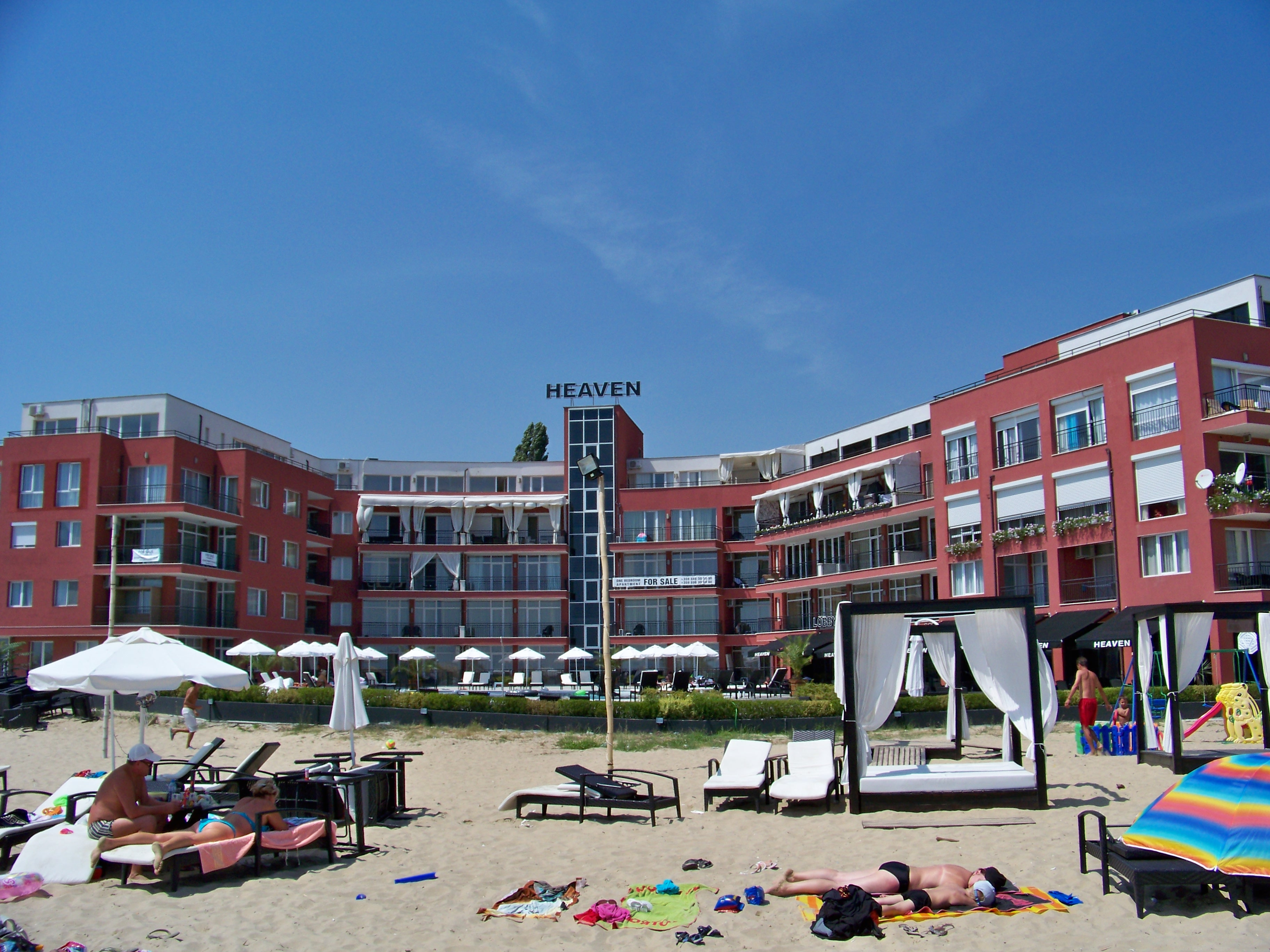
