= Irakli (beach) =

Beach in Bulgaria

Coordinates: 42°45′6.8″N 27°53′19″E

Irakli ("Heracles") is a beach situated in the middle part of the Bulgarian Black Sea Coast south of Obzor. It is a well known clothing optional beach.

== Honour ==
Irakli Peak on Graham Land in Antarctica is named after Irakli.

== See also ==
- Natura 2000
