= Topeiros =

Topeiros Τόπειρος
- Municipality

- Location within Greece
- Coordinates: 40°59′N 24°48′E
- Country: Greece
- Administrative region: East Macedonia and Thrace
- Regional unit: Xanthi
- Seat: Evlalo

Government
  - Mayor: Thomas Michoglou (since 2014)

Area
  - Municipality: 312.5 km^{2} (120.7 sq mi)

Population (2021)
  - Municipality: 9,473
  - Density: 30.31/km^{2} (78.51/sq mi)
- Time zone: UTC+2 (EET)
  - Summer (DST): UTC+3 (EEST)
- Vehicle registration: AH

Topeiros (Greek: Τόπειρος) is a municipality in the Xanthi regional unit, Greece. The municipality has an area of 312.493 km^{2} and a population 9,473 (2021). The seat of the municipality is in Evlalo.

== History ==
Topeiros was an ancient Thracian settlement, which in the imperial times evolved into a great urban center survived until the Byzantine period. The city is identified with the late Roman and Byzantine ruins saved a little south of the modern village of Paradeisos, where there is a passage of the river Nestos. The city functioned as tribal, administrative and religious center of the Thracian tribe of Sapaioi.

Thanks to its strategic position, in early 2nd AD century it was rebuilt – according to the Greek type of city-states – by emperor Trajan under his provincial policy intended to urbanization of Thrace. It was then known as Ulpia Topirus in Latin. Within the limits of its territory that stretched on both banks of the river Nestos were a dense network of rural settlements and castles, as well several Roman stations of Via Egnatia.

== Gallery ==
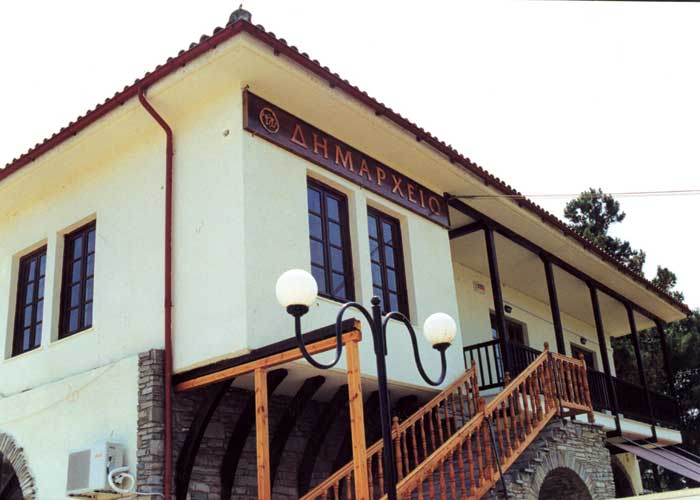
The seat of the municipality in Evlalo

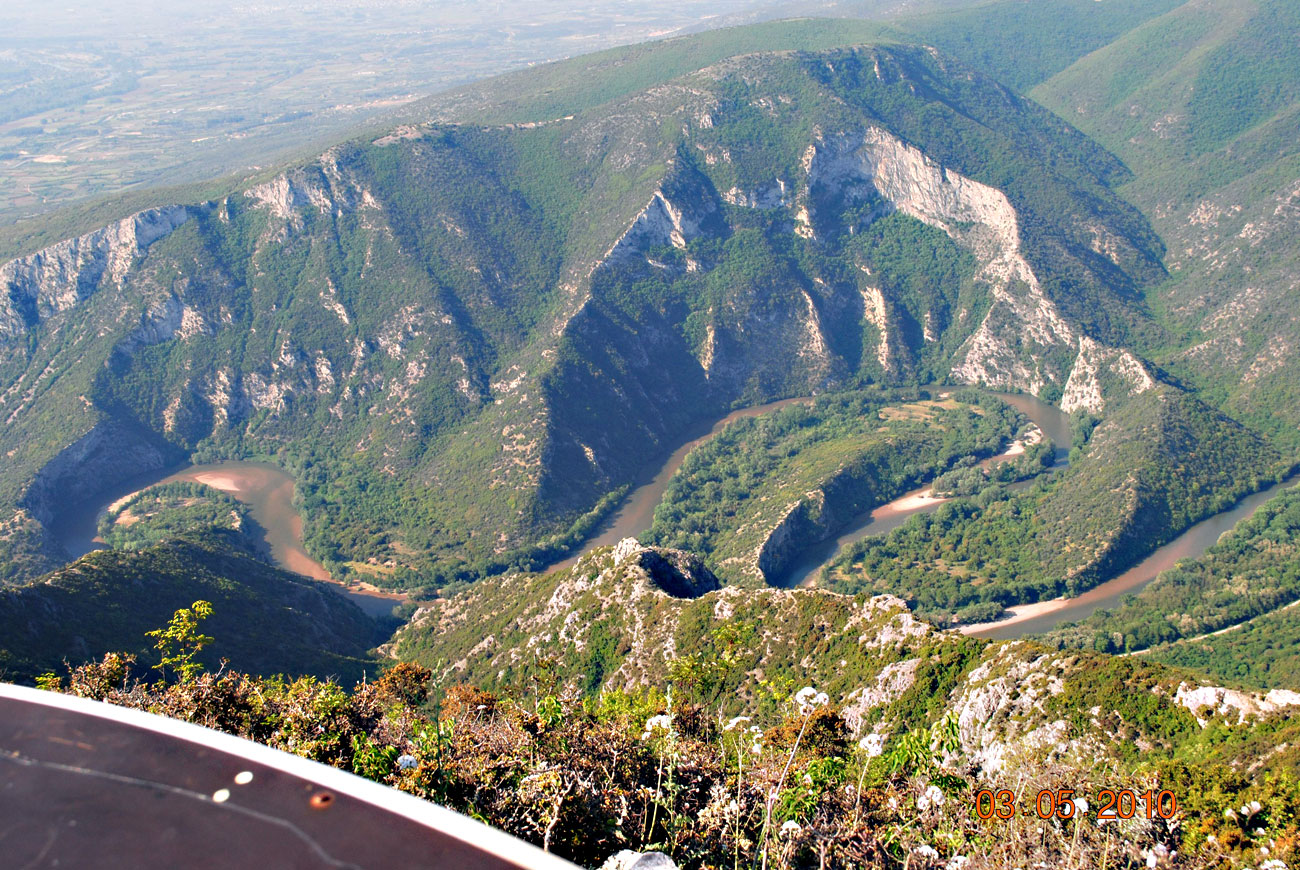
The Nestos river

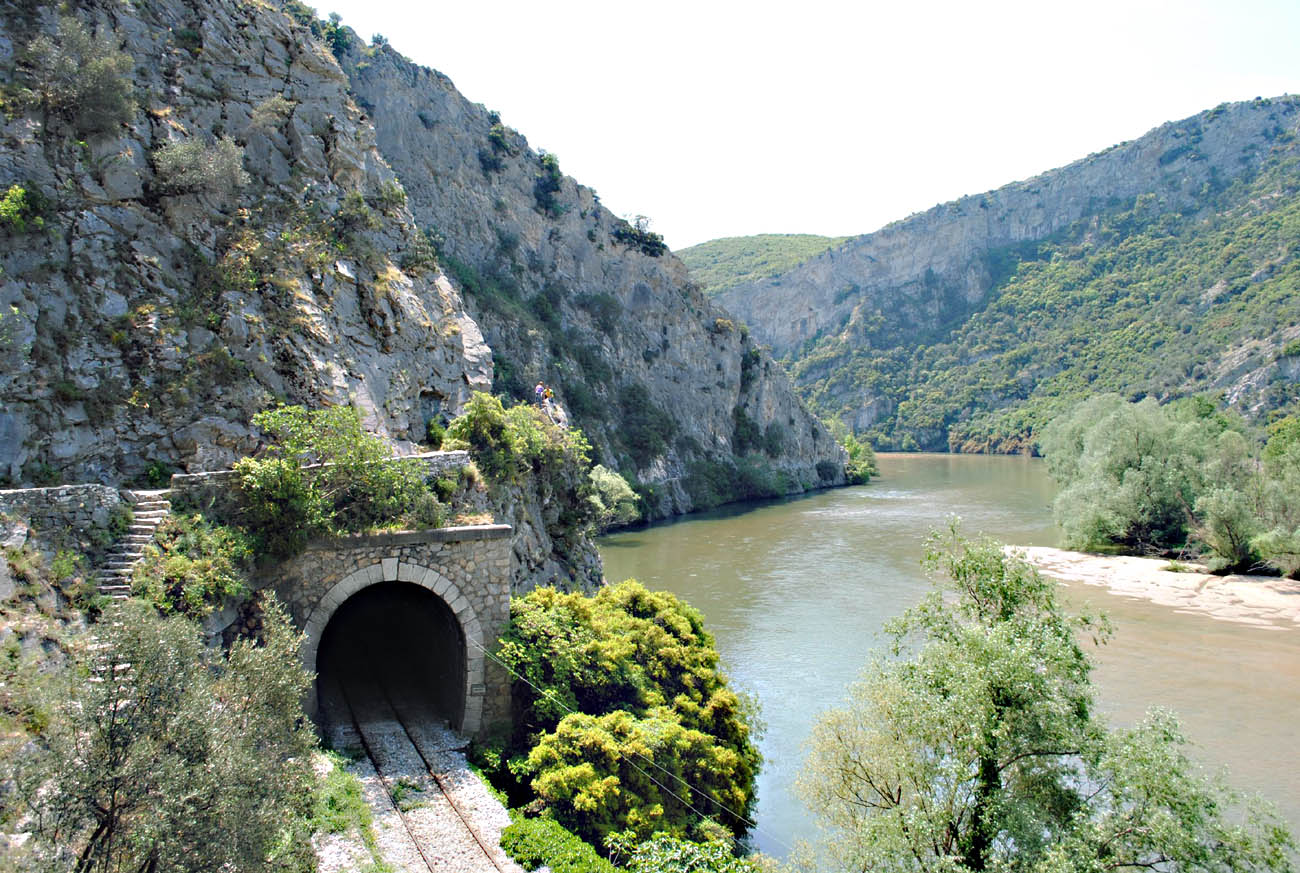
Railway tunnel by the Nestos river

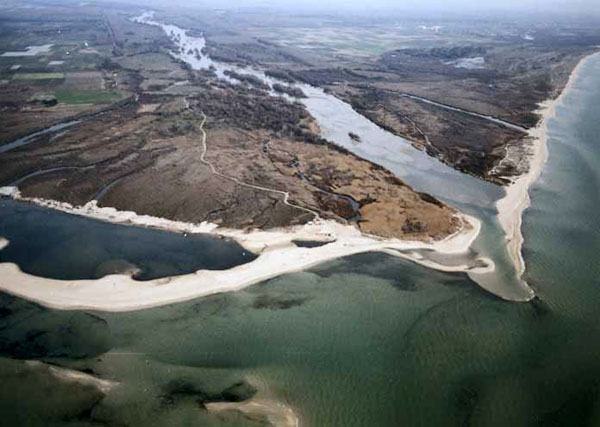
Delta of the Nestos river

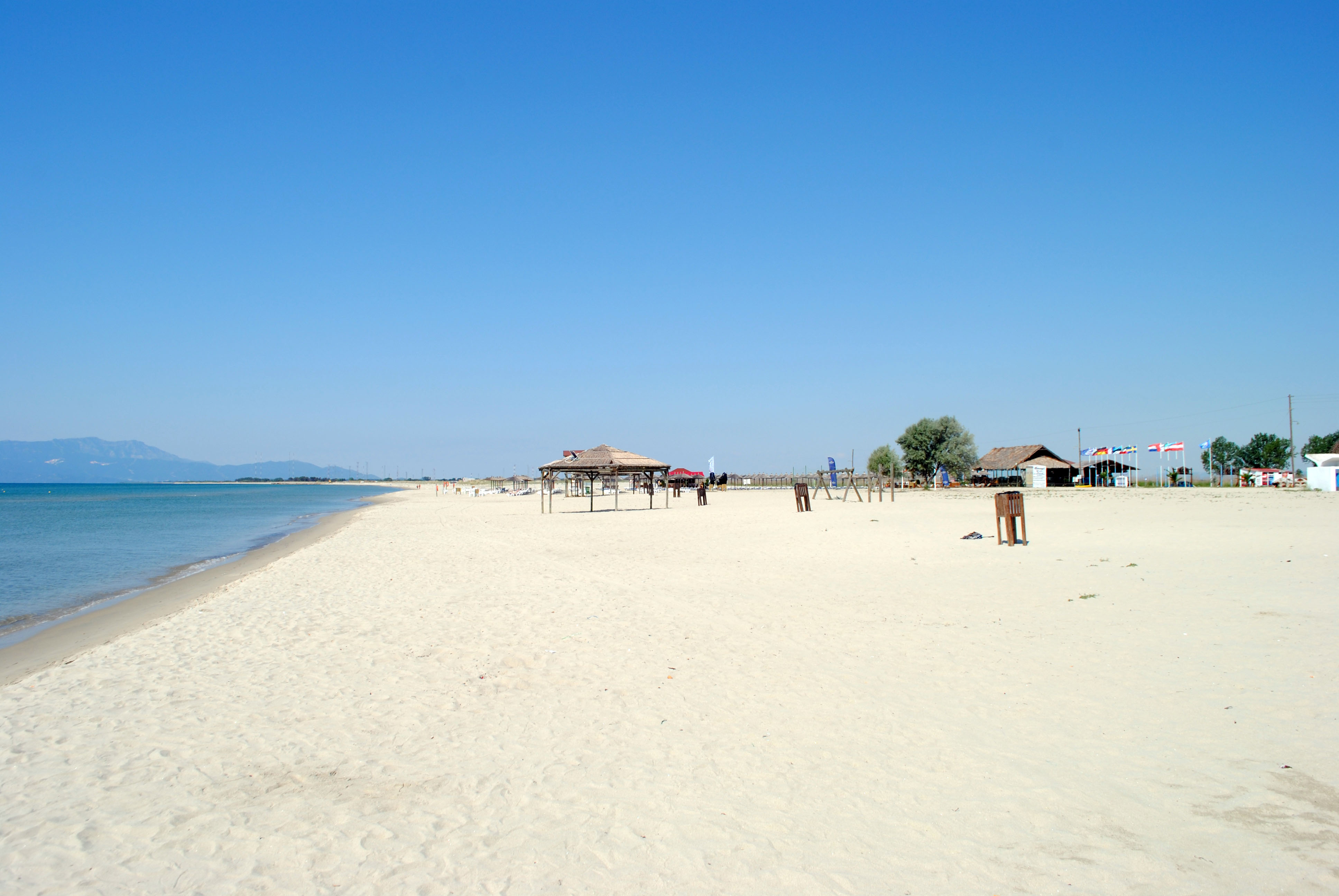
Maggana beach
