= Tankovo, Burgas Province =

Human settlement in Bulgaria

Coordinates: 42°41′40″N 27°39′00″E

Tankovo (Bulgarian: Тънково) is a village in South-East Bulgaria, situated in Obshtina Nessebar, in the Burgas region. As of 2007, it has 1,185 residents.
