= Obzor =

Resort town in Burgas, Bulgaria

Obzor Обзор
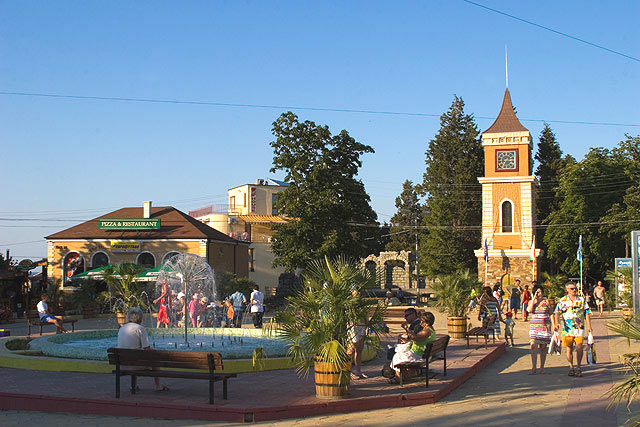
- Town square of Obzor

- Location of Obzor
- Coordinates: 42°49′N 27°53′E
- Country: Bulgaria
- Province (Oblast): Burgas
- Elevation: 0 m (0 ft)

Population (15 March 2009)
  - Total: 2,125
- Time zone: UTC+2 (EET)
  - Summer (DST): UTC+3 (EEST)
- Postal Code: 8250
- Area code: 0556

Obzor (Bulgarian: Обзор [obˈzɔr]) is a seaside resort town on the Black Sea coast of Bulgaria. It is part of the Nesebar Municipality of Burgas Province. Dating back to ancient times, Obzor has been known by several different names: Naulochos under the Thracians and Greeks, Templum Iovis under the Romans, and Gözeken under the Ottomans. Obzor took its current name in 1936 and gained town status in 1984.

== Etymology ==
The Thracian and ancient Greek name of Obzor was Naulochos (Ναύλοχος). It was a small port on the coast of Thrace, a colony of Mesembria. The ancient Romans named it Templum Iovis (Temple of Jupiter); Pliny called it Tetranaulochus. During the Ottoman rule of Bulgaria, it was known as Gözeken. The modern name was introduced in 1936; Obzor obtained town privileges on 9 September 1984.

== History ==
Obzor Hill on Graham Land in Antarctica was named after the town in 2010.

On 28 February 2021, the citizens of Obzor and six nearby villages voted in a referendum to separate from Nesebar Municipality and form an independent municipality, centered on Obzor. However, the referendum was subsequently declared invalid by presidential decree.

== Transportation ==
The 2200-m-long Kaleto eco path (Bulgarian: Екопътека "Калето") connects the northwestern outskirts of Obzor with the remains of a medieval fortress. Visitors can see a 10-m-high waterfall and a mineral spring along the trail.

== Twin towns ==
Obzor is twinned with Dębica in Poland and Svietlahorsk in Belarus.
