= İğneada =

- Municipality
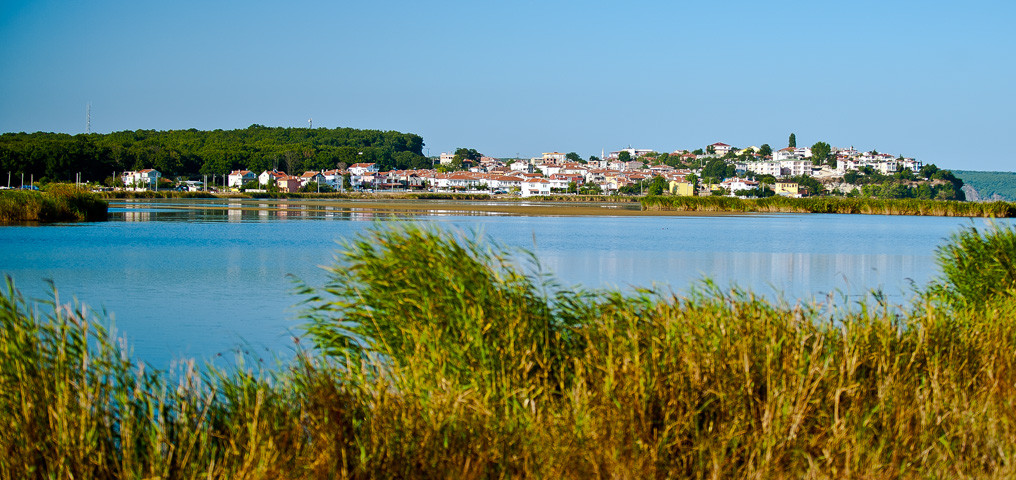

- Location within Turkey Location within Marmara
- Coordinates: 41°52′34″N 27°59′10″E
- Country: Turkey
- Province: Kırklareli
- District: Demirköy

Government
  - Mayor: Tahir Işık (CHP)
- Elevation: 0 m (0 ft)
- Population (2022): 2,511
- Time zone: UTC+3 (TRT)
- Postal code: 39650
- Area code: 0288
- Website: www.igneada.bel.tr

İğneada, formerly Thynias (Greek: Θυνίας), is a town (belde) in the Demirköy District, Kırklareli Province, Turkey. Its population is 2,511 (2022). It lies on the Black Sea coast and is approximately 5 km (3 mi) south of the Mutludere river which forms the border with Bulgaria. The land is covered by mainly oak forests, typical flora of the Yıldız (Istranca) Mountains. Forestry, fishing and tourism are the main occupations of the town population. The population in East Thrace are of different ethnicities, some originally from Bulgaria, Romania, Greece, Yugoslavia, and the Caucasus, including:

- Turkish people (Türkler)
- Bosniaks (Boşnaklar)
- Albanians (Arnavutlar)
- Pomaks (Pomaklar)
- Gajal (Gacallar)
- Muhacir (Muhacirler)
- Tatars (Tatarlar)
- Hill people (Dağlılar)
- Vallahades (Patriyotlar)
- Circassians (Çerkesler)
- Romani people (Romanlar)
- Turkmens Amuca tribe (Türkmen Amucalar).

The İğneada Floodplain Forests National Park with its Lake Saka Nature Reserve Area is situated around the town. It harbors one of the few remaining floodplain forests in all of Europe, which is home to many different bird species.

The second of Turkey's nuclear power plants is planned to be built in the area. A fourth revision environmental impact assessment was submitted and approved. There is no timeline or budget set for the project as of November 2015.
