= Demirköy =

Demirköy may refer to the following places in Turkey:

- Demirköy, Kırklareli, a town and a district in Kırklareli Province
- Demirköy, Lalapaşa, a town or village in District of Lalapaşa, Edirne Province
- Demirköy, Nallıhan, a village in District of Nallıhan, Ankara Province
- Demirköy, Pazaryeri, a village in District of Pazaryeri, Bilecik Province
- Demirköy, Yusufeli, a village in Yusufeli District, Artvin Province
- Demirköy Foundry, a historic foundry ruin
