= Demirköy Foundry =

Historic foundry ruin in Turkey

- Demirköy Dökümhanesi (Turkish)
- Fatih Foundry; Fatih Dökümhanesi
- Location of Demirköy Foundry in Turkey
- 41°49′03″N 27°48′51″E
- Type: Foundry
- Location: Demirköy, Kırklareli, Turkey
- Region: Marmara Region

History
- Abandoned: After World War I

Site notes
- Material: Stone and wood
- Area: 9,395 m^{2} (101,130 sq ft)
- Excavation dates: 2003-present

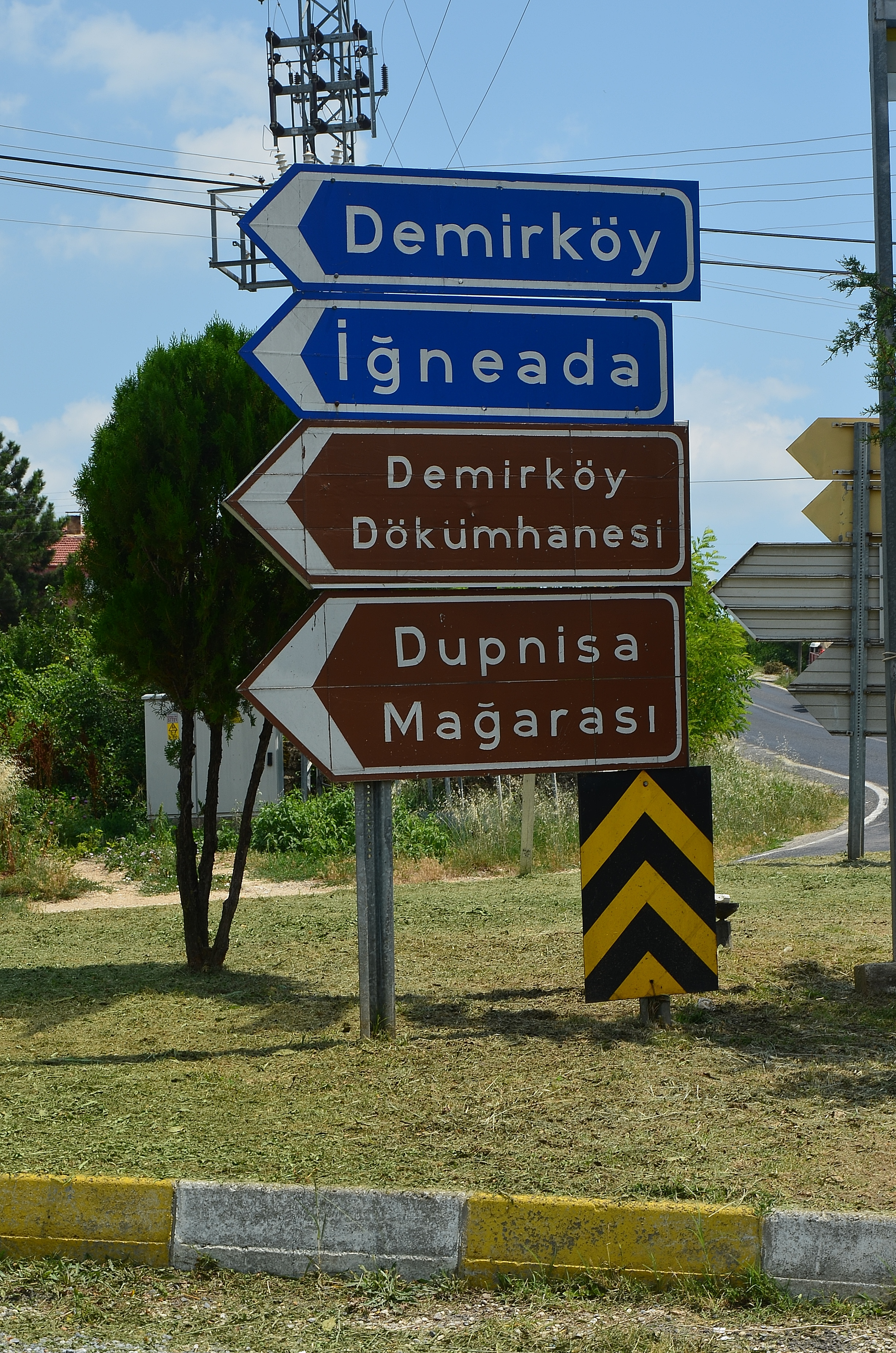
Directional road sign for Demirköy Foundry (third from top).

The Demirköy Foundry (Turkish: Demirköy Dökümhanesi) is a historic foundry ruin of archaeological importance located at Demirköy in Kırklareli Province, northwestern Turkey.

== Location ==
The archaeological site is situated 3.8 km (2.4 mi) southeast of the district seat Demirköy. An iron metalworking center was established at this location in the 15th century during the Ottoman Empire due to the rich iron ore deposits in the region. The site is deep in the Strandzha forests, about 20 km (12 mi) far from the Black Sea coast and 25 km (16 mi) to the Bulgarian-Turkish border.

== History ==
It is known that the cannonballs fired during the conquest of Constantinople in 1453 by Ottoman Sultan Mehmed II (Fatih Sultan Mehmet, Mehmed the Conqueror) were manufactured here. The facility is also called today by the local people as Fatih Foundry (the "Conqueror's Foundry"). Demirköy means literally "Ironville". Iron casting continued in the foundry from the mid-15th century until the late 19th century. It appears that the foundry underwent a thoroughgoing renovation during the Mahmud II (1808–1839) period. The foundry was then subordinated to the administration of Imperial Cannon Factory (Tophane-i Amire) in Istanbul, which was established in 1839. According to the Ottoman documents, its historic name was "Samakocuk Dökümhane-i Amiresi" (literally: Samakocuk İmperial Foundry).

According to a 1923-published report of the government doctor in Kırklareli, the foundry was destroyed by the invading Russian troops during the Russo-Turkish War (1877–78). In 1913, the state-owned foundry was leased to a British company for a period of 99 years, but in 1916 the lease was annulled due to the circumstances of World War I. After World War I, the foundry was abandoned; its structure, however, remained intact until the 1950s. The metal parts of the foundry were sold to scrappers by the National Estate Authority (Turkish: Milli Emlak) in 1947.

== Archaeological findings ==
The Kırklareli Museum identified and registered the remains of the Ottoman foundry as an archaeological conservation area in September 1991. In May 2002, a research project was initiated on the iron mining and metalworking in the area. Archival investigations, surface surveys and archaeological excavations at the partly preserved site, which covers a total area of 9,395 m^{2} (101,130 sq ft), began in the summer of 2003.

Important finds of industrial archaeology, unearthed in 2005 at a site 230–250 m (750–820 ft) far from the original site, revealed the existence of another metalworking workshop with two melting furnaces. The workshop was 20 m × 50 m (66 ft × 164 ft) in dimension and consisted of two sections with a central entrance. While the eastern wing furnace was identified as a blast furnace for iron production showing advanced technology of the 17th century, the west-wing furnace was used for copper smelting. According to 19th-century Ottoman documents, copper production was the second major activity following iron metalworking in the foundries of Demirköy-Samakocuk. Copper was used for copper alloy to make molds for casting cannonballs.

The units of the main foundry complex, which was built in a square-plan on a hillside, are situated on two ground levels of 10 m (33 ft) difference in elevation. The upper section was fortified by 1.10 m (3.6 ft)-thick and 4 m (13 ft)-high surrounding stone walls with polygon-formed bastions on the corners. The main gate in the north opened to the courtyard at this upper terrace, which contains living and service spaces, a partly-preserved Ottoman hammam and a mosque. The quarters of the foundry workers for living and sleeping were placed along the walls in the north, west and east. In the southwest of the courtyard, the basement walls of the foundry mosque is situated with a brick minaret erected on stone base next to it.

Foundry's production units were on the lower-level terrace south of the fortified courtyard. During the excavations in 2008, an iron workshop with two melting furnaces was unearthed southeast of the courtyard. While the archaeological excavations in the upper ground level are completed, research in the lower ground level is ongoing.

In order to achieve high temperature needed in the melting furnaces, bellows were utilized, which were worked up by a water wheel. It is believed that the power was transmitted from the water wheel to the bellows by a horizontal shaft. An open-deck canal northeast of the foundry provided water supply from a creek. The canal reaches the iron-made water wheel in the lower ground level after entering the facility under the eastern fortification wall in a brick vault-like tunnel, and running southwards under the courtyard. This main canal has branches within the facility, and serves also the workshop far outside. During the excavations, iron parts and one of the bases belonging to the water wheel were found.

Archaeologists discovered around the foundry the existence of a historic underground mine adit and metallurgy pits beside ruins of melting furnaces, slag heap deposits and charcoal piles. Scientific research revealed that processing of cast iron and ferroalloy was done here.

Unearthed archaeological artifacts include molds for round shot, cannonballs of various size, nails of various length, iron powder, ashes, furnace blowpipes, samples of domestic and imported fire bricks, parts of agricultural equipment, porcelain kitchenware and household tools manufactured in later years.

According to Ottoman documents of the 18th and 19th century, the semi-finished products of the foundry were sent to "Tophane-i Amire" (Imperial Cannon Factory) and "Tersane-i Amire" (Imperial Shipyard) in Istanbul from the port of İğneada on the Black Sea coast.

It is projected that the foundry will be transformed into an open-air museum for industrial archaeology after completion of the archaeological works, currently carried out by 35 archaeologists from several Turkish universities under the supervision of Mimar Sinan Fine Arts University. The foundry mosque building will be redeveloped as an industry museum for traditional iron production techniques.
