= Bottomland forest =

Forest type

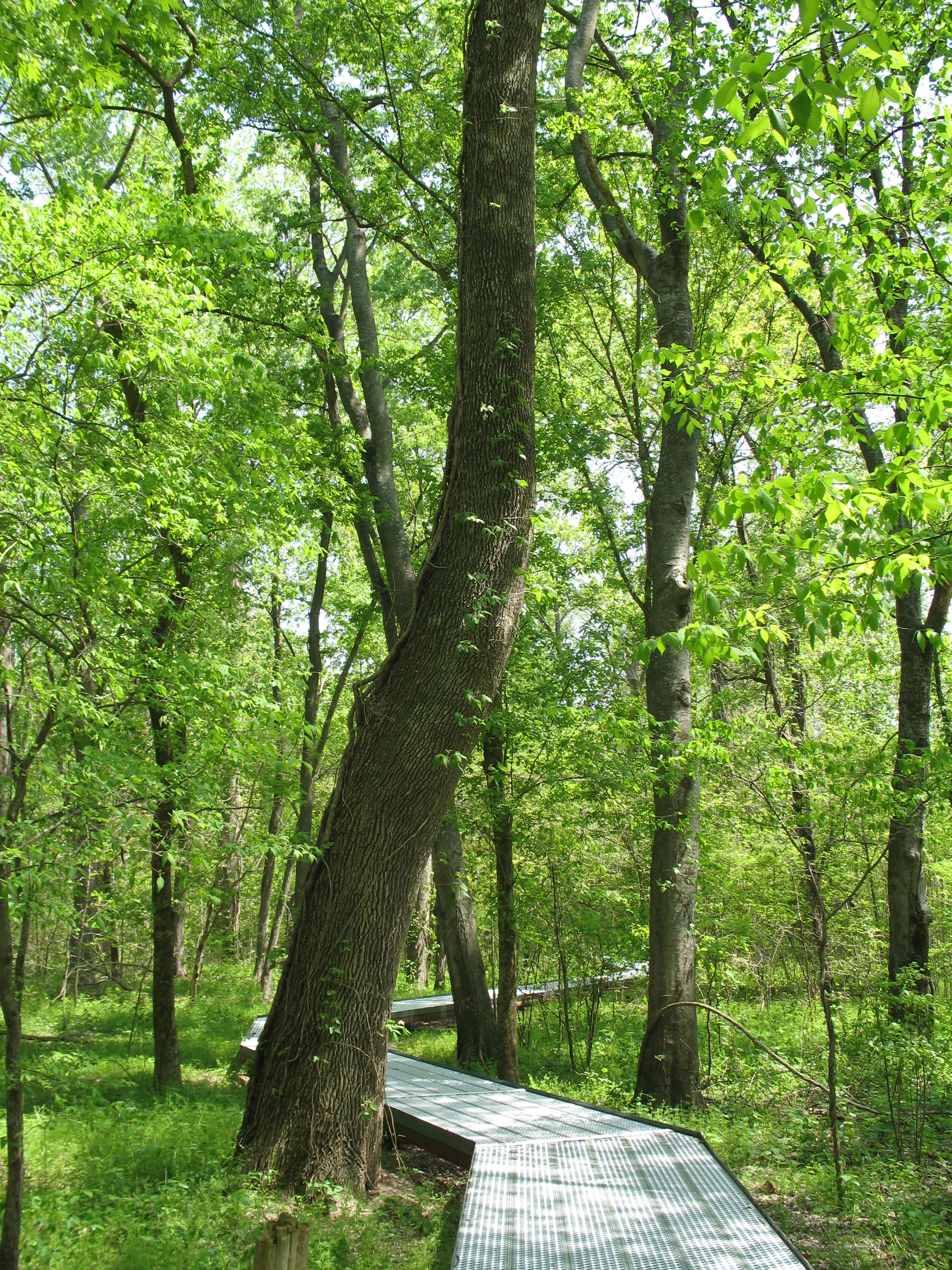
Big Oak Tree State Park, Missouri

Bottomland forest is woodland on lowland alluvial floodplains or lower terraces of rivers and streams. Bottomland forest is very rare in Europe. The bottomland hardwood forest is a type of deciduous and evergreen hardwood forest found in broad lowland floodplains along large rivers and lakes in the United States and elsewhere. They are occasionally flooded, which builds up the alluvial soils required for the gum, oak and bald cypress trees that typically grow in this type of biome. The trees often develop unique characteristics to allow submergence, including cypress knees and fluted trunks, but can not survive continuous flooding.

Typical examples of this forest type are found throughout the Gulf Coast states, and along the Mississippi River in the United States. It is estimated there were 24,000,000 acres (97,000 km^{2}) in the region before foresting and farming reduced it to approximately 4,000,000 acres (16,000 km^{2}) today.

On the Black Sea coast of Turkey there is Lake Saka Nature Reserve in İğneada Floodplain Forests National Park, Sarıkum Nature Reserve in Sinop, and Hacıosman Wood nature reserve in Samsun.
