= East Thrace =

Portion of Turkey that is located in South-eastern Europe

Coordinates: 41°9′13″N 27°22′0″E

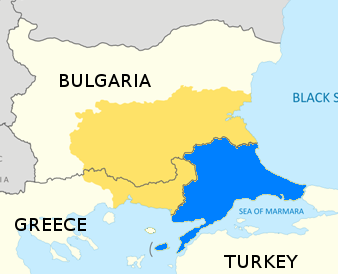
East Thrace (blue) within Thrace (yellow)

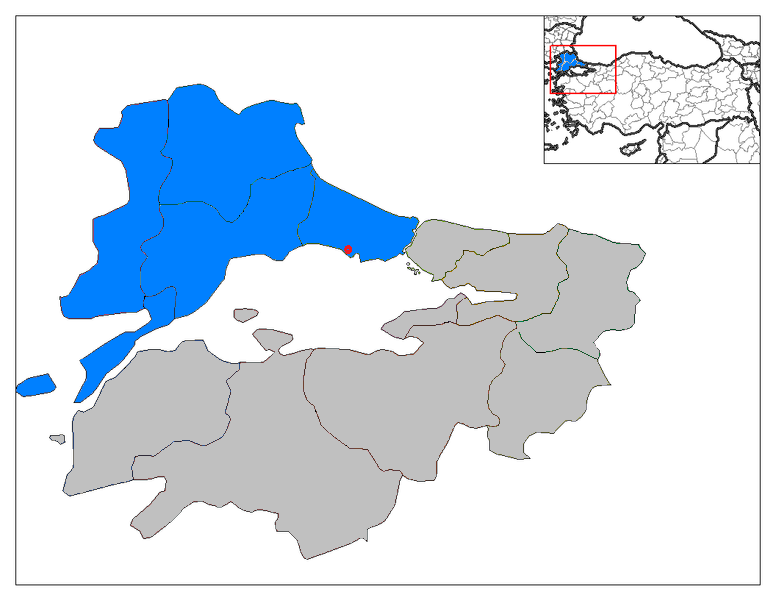
East Thrace (blue) within the Marmara region of Turkey

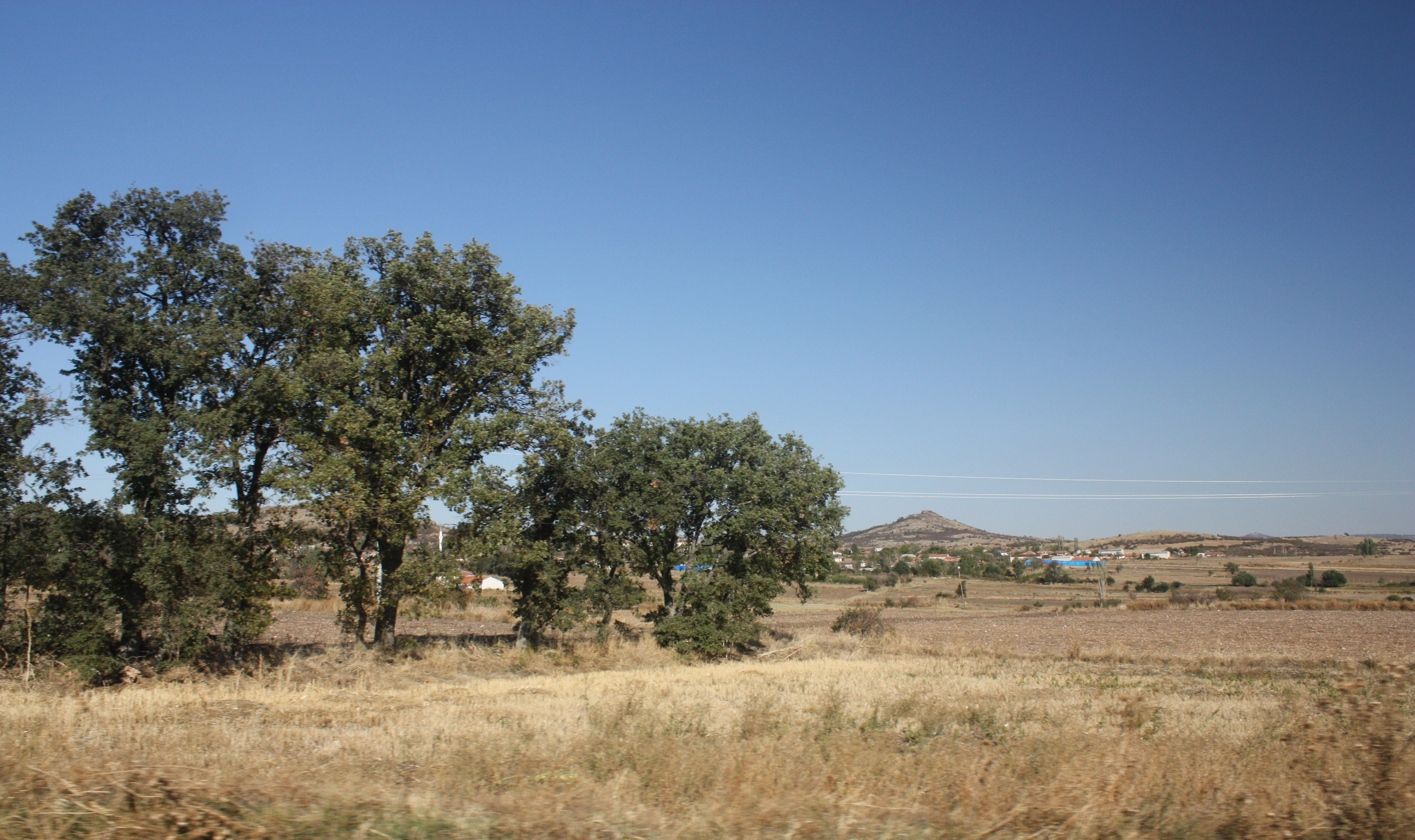
East Thrace landscape in Edirne Province, Turkey

East Thrace or Eastern Thrace, (Note: (Turkish: Doğu Trakya or simply Trakya; Greek: Ανατολική Θράκη, romanized: Anatolikí Thráki; Bulgarian: Източна Тракия, romanized: Iztochna Trakiya)) also known as Turkish Thrace or European Turkey or Turkey in Europe, is the part of Turkey that is geographically in Southeast Europe. Turkish Thrace or also known as European Turkey accounts for 3% of Turkey's land area (an area of 23,764 km^{2}) and 12% of the population. Asian Turkey, called Anatolia or Asia Minor, has an area of 755,688 km^{2} (97% of the country). The two are separated by the Dardanelles, Sea of Marmara and Straits of the Bosphorus, a route of about 361 km. The largest city is Istanbul, which straddles the Bosporus between Main region of Europe and Anatolia in Europe. East Thrace is of historic importance as it is next to a major sea trade corridor. It is currently also of specific geostrategic importance because the sea corridor, which includes two narrow straits, provides access to the Mediterranean Sea from the Black Sea for the navies of five countries: Russia, Ukraine, Romania, Bulgaria, and Georgia. The region also serves as a future connector of existing Turkish, Bulgarian, and Greek high-speed rail networks. Due to the guest worker agreement with Turkey and Germany, some Turks in Germany originally come from Eastern Thrace, mostly from the Kırklareli Province.

== Definition ==
East Thrace sometimes refers to the eastern part of the historical region of Thrace. It is also used for the part of Thrace that is inside Turkey. The area includes all the territories of the Turkish provinces of Edirne, Tekirdağ and Kırklareli, as well as those territories on the European continent of the provinces of Çanakkale and Istanbul. The land borders of East Thrace were defined by the Treaty of Constantinople (1913) and the Bulgarian-Ottoman convention (1915) and were reaffirmed by the Treaty of Lausanne.

== Geography ==
Turkish Thrace or also known as European Turkey accounts for 3% of Turkey's land area (an area of 23,764 km^{2}) and 12% of the population. Asiatic Turkey, called Anatolia or Asia Minor, has an area of 755,688 km^{2} (97% of the country). The two are separated by the Dardanelles, Sea of Marmara and Straits of the Bosphorus, a route of about 361 km (224 mi). The southernmost part of eastern Thrace is called the Gallipoli peninsula. East Thrace is bordered on the west by Greece and on the north by Bulgaria, with the Aegean Sea to the southwest and the Black Sea to the northeast.

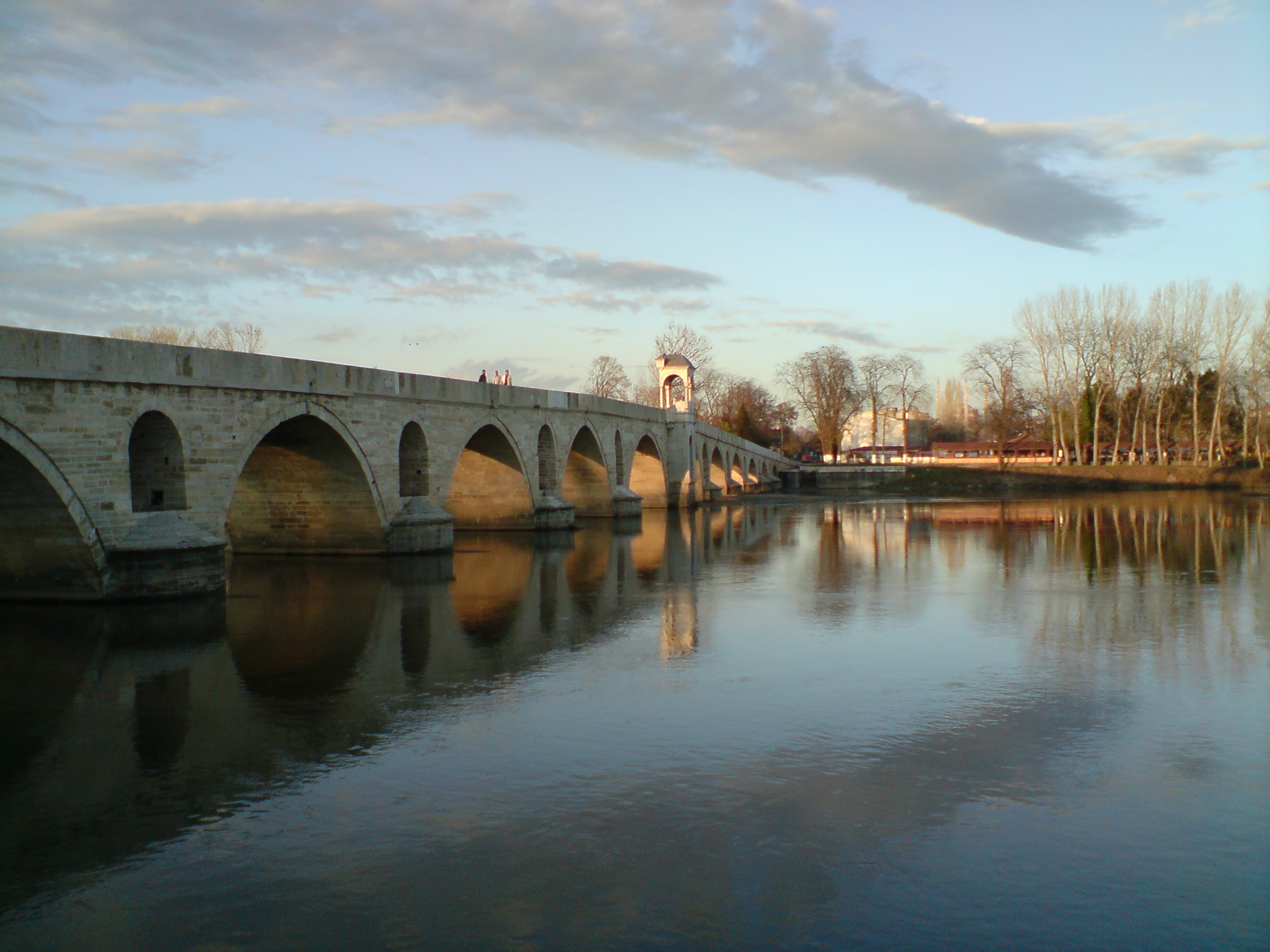
River Maritsa (Turkish: Meriç), which forms the land border between Greece and Turkey, also forms the natural border between Western Thrace and East Thrace.

Province (part)	Area km^{2}	Population (2022)	Density /km^{2}
Çanakkale (Europe)	1,528	63,016	41
Edirne	6,074	414,714	68
Istanbul (Europe)	3,563	10,241,510	2,874
Kırklareli	6,278	369,347	59
Tekirdağ	6,313	1,142,451	181
East Thrace	23,756	12,231,038	515
% of national	3.1%	14.3%	452%

- Source: Citypopulation.de mirroring data from: State Institute of Statistics, Republic of Turkey (web).

== Climate ==
The area has a hybrid mediterranean climate/humid subtropical climate on the Aegean Sea coast and the Marmara Sea coast, and an oceanic climate on the Black Sea coast. Summers are warm to hot, humid and moderately dry whereas winters are cold and wet and sometimes snowy. The coastal climate keeps the temperatures relatively mild.

== History ==
East Thrace was the setting for several important events in history and legend, including:

- The Greek myth of Hero and Leander takes place in the ancient city of Sestus.
- Aeneas founded the city of Aenus while trying to find new lands during his mythological travels.
- After the death of Alexander the Great, in the period called the Diadochi, Alexander's general Lysimachus (360–281 BC) became king of Thrace and established his capital in Lysimachia.
- The Battle of Adrianople in 378 was an important turning point in the decline of the Roman Empire.
- Çimpe Castle was the first European territory held by the Ottoman Empire, dating back to 1352.
- Edirne was the second capital of the Ottoman Empire after Bursa.
- The Gallipoli Campaign, one of the most important campaigns of the First World War, was fought on the Gallipoli peninsula.

During the Russo-Turkish War (1877–1878) and the Balkan Wars (1912–1913), Muslim Muhacir of various ethnic groups from the former Ottoman territories in the Balkans, were forced to flee toward eastern Thrace through expulsions, violence and massacres, followed by further emigration caused by the 1923–24 Population exchange between Greece and Turkey and the Greek genocide of 1913–1923.

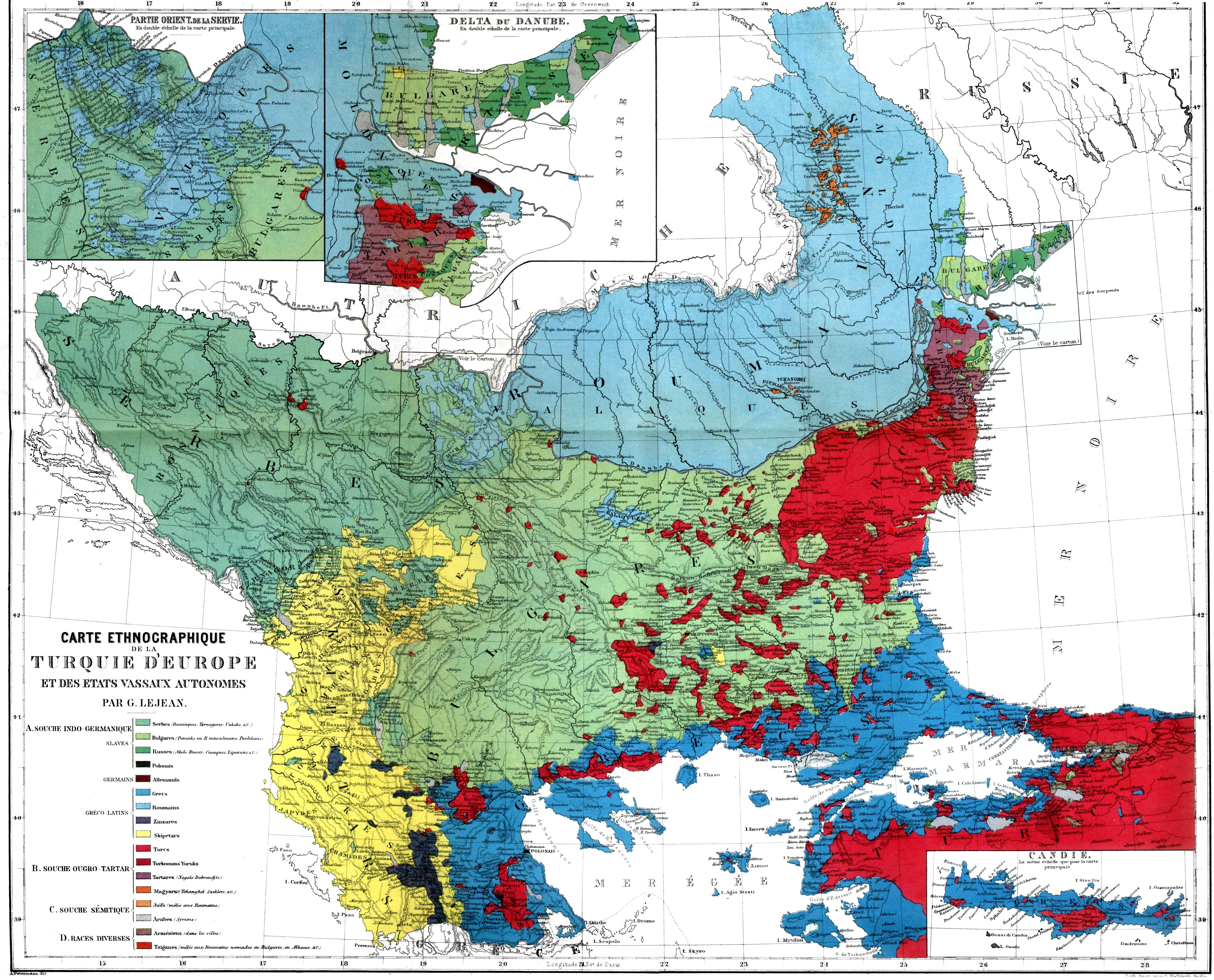
Ethnic map of Rumelia in 1861. East Thrace was inhabited predominantly by Greeks.

Prior to that the distribution of ethnoreligious groups in the local sanjaks was as follows:

Ottoman Official Statistics, 1910
Sanjak	Turks	Greeks	Bulgarians	Others	Total
Edirne	128,000	113,500	31,500	14,700	287,700
Kırk Kilise	53,000	77,000	28,500	1,150	159,650
Tekirdağ	63,500	56,000	3,000	21,800	144,300
Gelibolu	31,500	70,500	2,000	3,200	107,200
Çatalca	18,000	48,500	—N/a	2,340	68,840
Istanbul	450,000	260,000	6,000	130,000	846,000
Total %	744,000; 46.11%	625,500; 38.76%	71,000; 4.40%	173,190; 10.74%	1,613,690
Ecumenical Patriarchate Statistics, 1912
Total %	604,500; 36.20%	655,600; 39.27%	71,800; 4.30%	337,600; 20.22%	1,669,500

The Muslim millet was recorded as Turkish, while the church members of the Ecumenical Patriarchate were recorded as Greek.

In the past century, modern East Thrace was the main component of the territory of the Adrianople Vilayet, which excluded the Constantinople Vilayet, but included West Thrace and parts of the Rhodopes and Sakar. A publication from December 21, 1912, in the Belgian magazine Ons Volk Ontwaakt (‘Our Nation Awakes’) estimated 1,006,500 inhabitants in the vilayet:

- Orthodox Bulgarians – 370,000
- Orthodox Greeks – 220,000
- Orthodox Armenians – 30,000
- Orthodox Albanians – 3,500
- Orthodox Turks – 3,000
- Muslim Turks – 250,000
- Pomaks – 115,000
- Muslim Romani – 15,000

21st century East Thrace constitutes what remains of Turkish Rumelia, which once stretched as far north as Hungary and as far west as Bosnia. Rumelia was lost piecemeal from 1699 onwards, until in 1912 the bulk of it was lost in the First Balkan War. Some small regains were made during the Second Balkan War. The current borders were set forth in the Treaty of Constantinople (1913) and the Bulgarian–Ottoman convention (1915), and were reaffirmed in the Treaty of Lausanne.

== Demographics ==
A large portion of the population are descendants of the Muhacir, such as Balkan Turks, Bulgarian Turks in Turkey, Amuca tribe, Albanians in Turkey, Bosniaks in Turkey, Gajal, Pomaks in Turkey, Megleno-Romanians, Vallahades, Crimean Tatars in Turkey, Circassians in Turkey, and Romani people in Turkey live there.

== Attractions and festivals ==
Some tourist attractions are the Edirne Museum, Complex of Sultan Bayezid II Health Museum, Treaty of Lausanne Monument and Museum, Kırklareli Museum, and the Edirne Palace. There are several historical religious buildings, such as the Selimiye Mosque, Üç Şerefeli Mosque, Old Mosque, Muradiye Mosque, and the Grand Synagogue of Edirne. There are also historical bridges, such as the Fatih Bridge, Meriç Bridge, and Uzunköprü Bridge.

Natural attractions include the Lake Gala National Park, İğneada Floodplain Forests National Park, Lake Saka Nature Reserve, and Dupnisa Cave.

Since 1360, the oil wrestling tournament Kırkpınar is held annually near Edirne; usually in late June. The Romani festival Kakava is held annually in Edirne and Kırklareli.

== Politics ==
In Eastern Thrace the Republican People's Party and Kemalism traditionally dominate. A scandal in Turkey was triggered by the statement of CHP Büyükçekmece Council Member Eren Savaş in May 2023 that Eastern Thrace should be separated from Turkey.

== Gallery ==
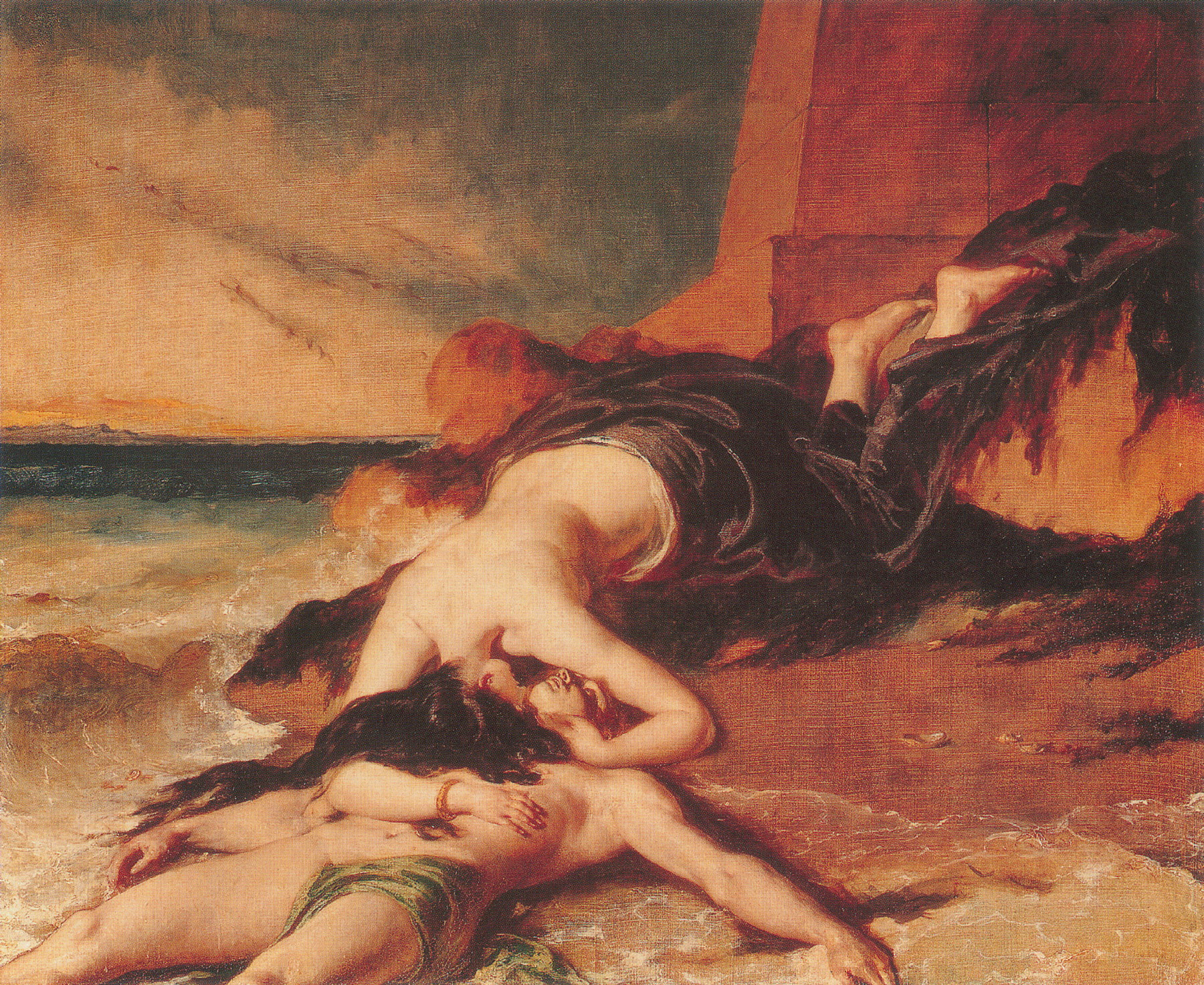
Hero and Leander

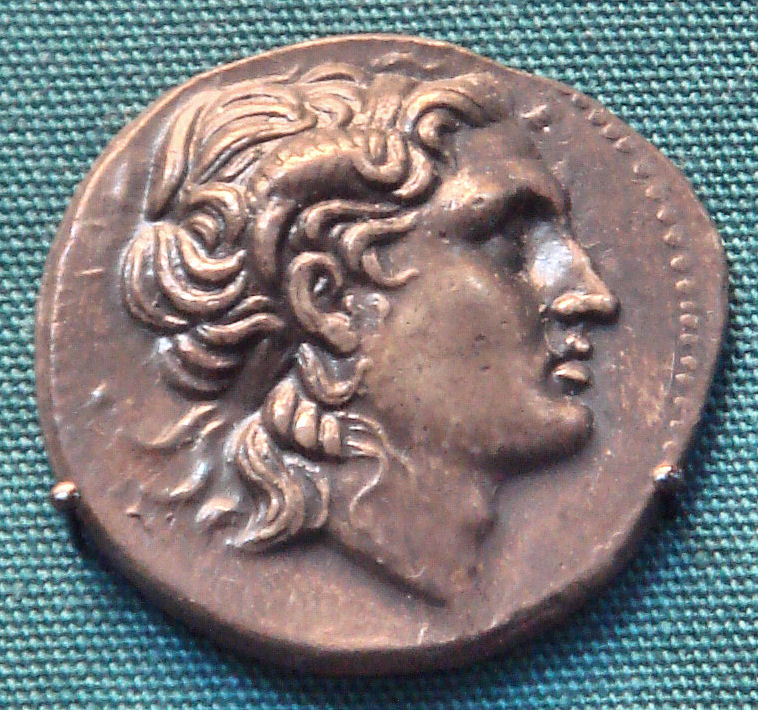
Coin of Lysimachus

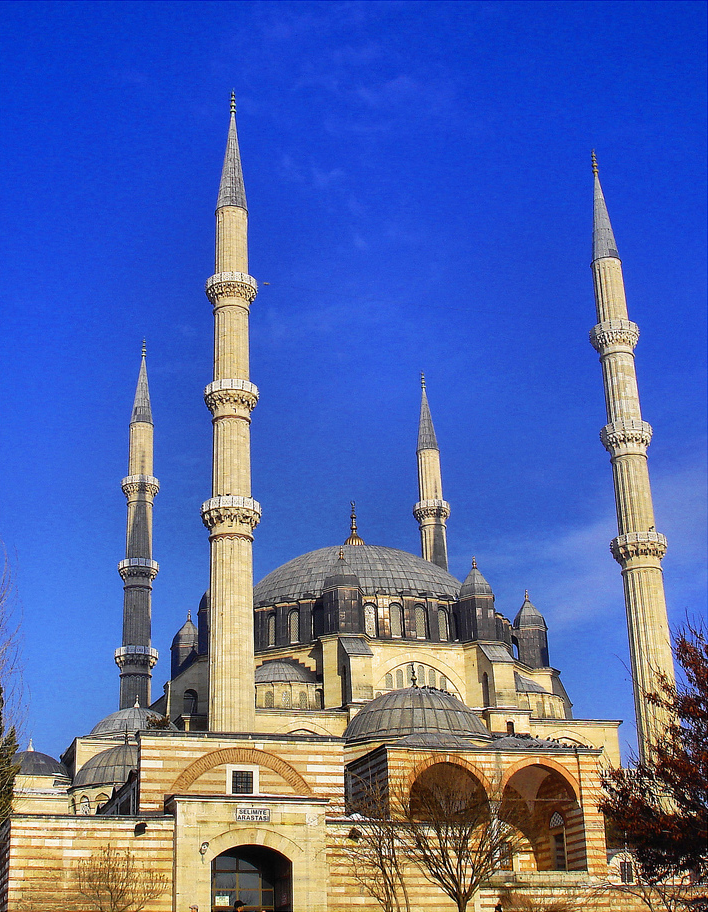
Selimiye Mosque, Edirne

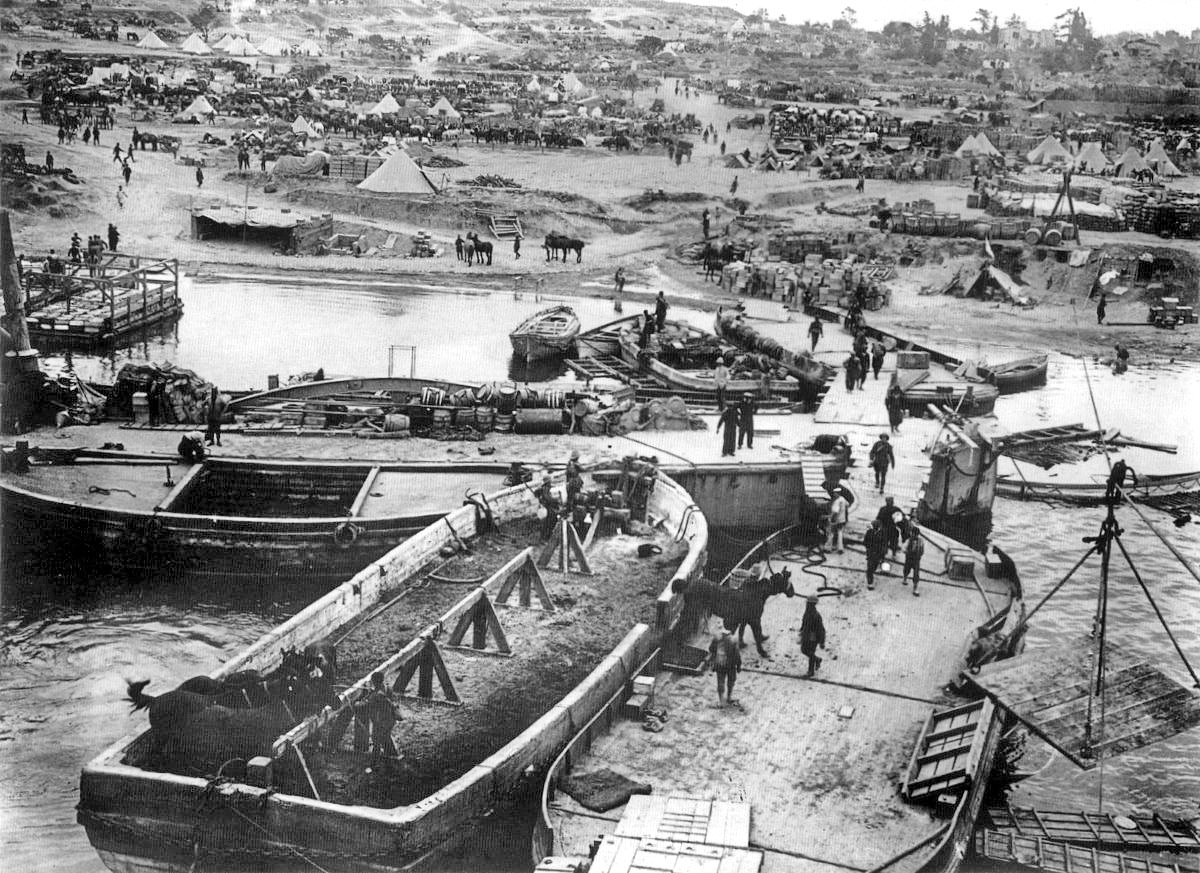
Cape Helles during the Gallipoli Campaign

== See also ==
- List of cities of Thrace, with detailed list for Eastern Thrace
- Geography of Turkey
- Northern Thrace
- Upper Thracian Plain
- Western Thrace
