= Thynias =

Town of ancient Thrace

Coordinates: 41°53′23″N 28°01′39″E

Thynias (Ancient Greek: Θυνιάς) was a town of ancient Thrace on the coast of the Pontus Euxinus on a promontory of the same name (modern İğneada Burnu), mentioned by numerous ancient authors. It was located north of Salmydessus, which was probably at one time in the territories of the Thyni, although Strabo speaks of the district as belonging to the people of Apollonia. According to Pliny the Elder, the town was placed a little to the south of the promontory.

Its site is located near İğneada in European Turkey.
