= Acarlar floodplain forest =

Floodplain forest in Kaynarca, Sakarya, Turkey

Acarlar floodplain forest Acarlar Gölü Longozu
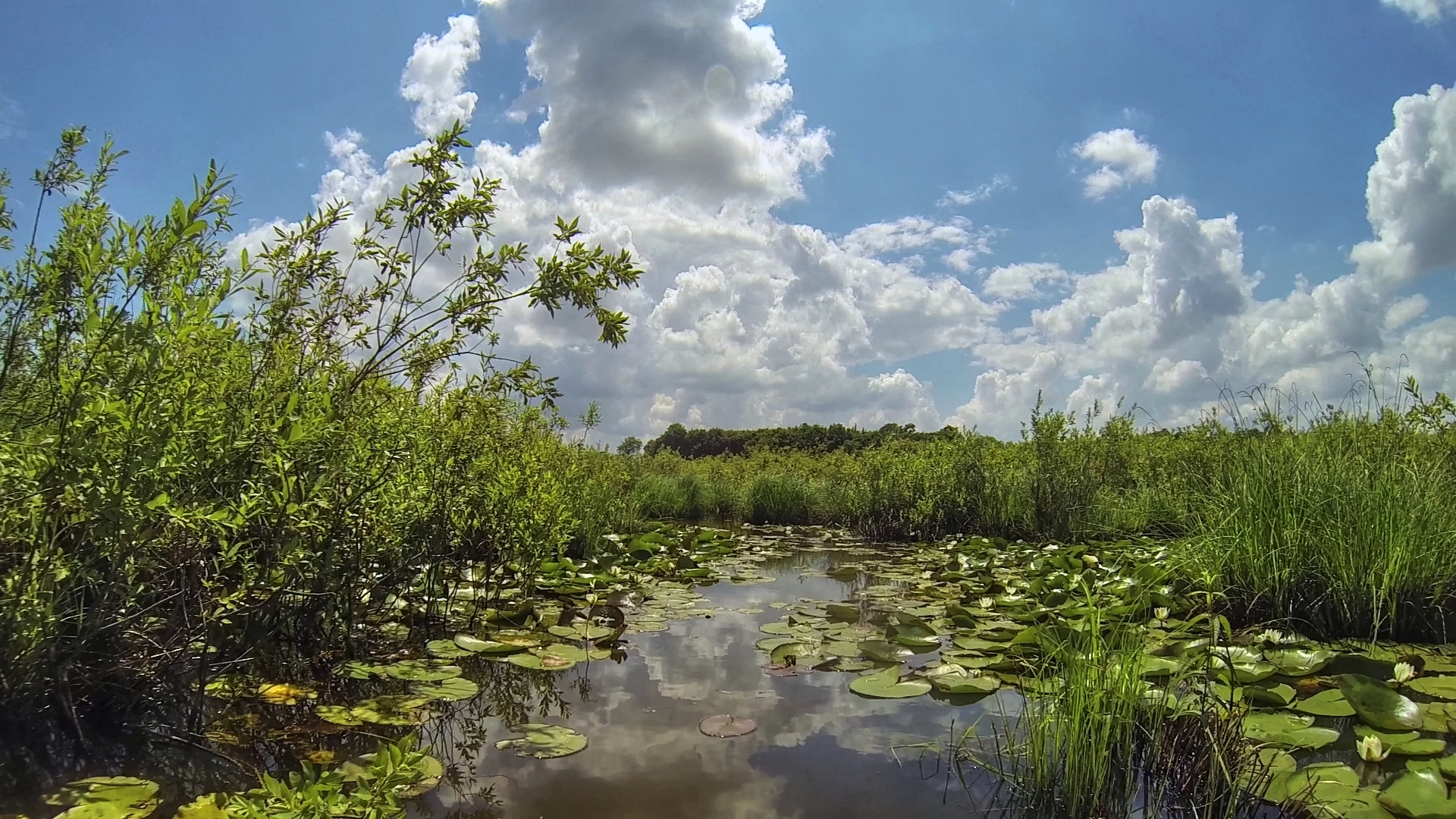
- Acarlar Floodplain Forest.

- Location within Turkey

Geography
- Location: Turkey
- Coordinates: 41°07′44″N 30°26′14″E

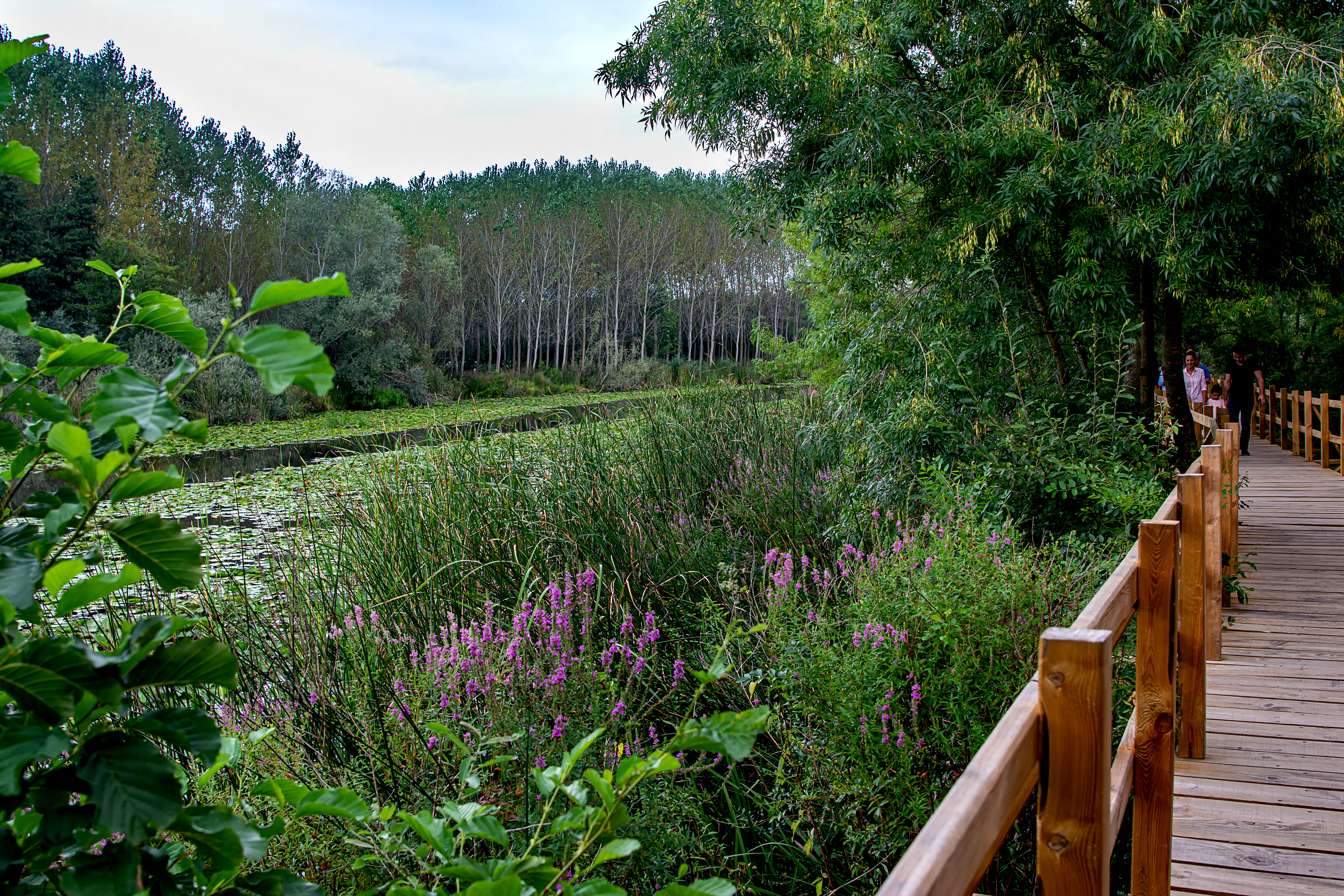
Lagoon and forest.

The Acarlar floodplain forest (Turkish: Acarlar Gölü Longozu) is a floodplain forest located in Sakarya Province, northwestern Turkey. It is a combination of seaside, lagoon, dunes and forest.

== Location and access ==
Situated between Karasu and Kaynarca north of Sakarya on the coast of Black Sea, it is Turkey's biggest and only mono-bloc floodplain forest. It is around 26 km (16 mi) from Karasu and around 50 km (31 mi) from Sakarya. Around the area, there are five villages of Karasu district and three of Kaynarca district.

At a distance of 2 km (1.2 mi) from Black Sea, the floodplain forest stretches over 12 km (7.5 mi) in length and a width of 1.0–1.5 km (0.62–0.93 mi).

The lagoon is accessible on the road İhsaniye-Denizköy.

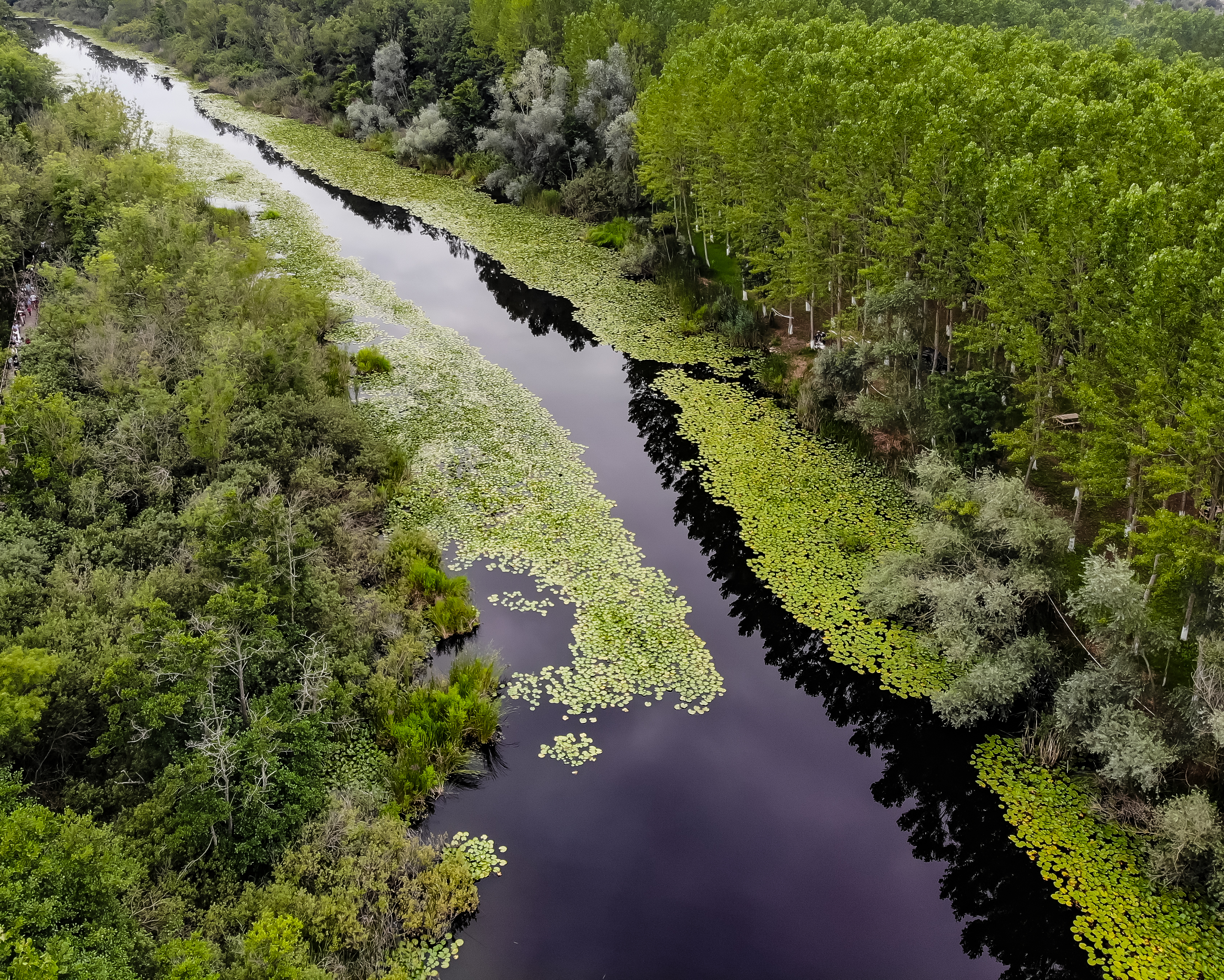
Areal view of the Lagoon and forest.

== Floodplain ==
The area is a typical lagoon, an inundated coastal terrain formed by separation from the sea by sandy barrier. Situated on the district border of Karasu-Kaynarca, and about 700 m (2,300 ft) far from the sea, the lagoon covers 1,562 ha (3,860 acres) extending parallel to the coast. It can be up to around 1.50 m (4.9 ft) deep. The land, which emerges due to dried-up floodplain during the summer months, is used by villagers for agriculture.

The floodplain is bordered in the north by 30–25 m (98–82 ft)-high dunes at Black Sea, and in the south by low hills of 100 m (330 ft) height in average. Excess water over flood stage flows into Okçu Creek, which joins Sakarya River in 6 km (3.7 mi) distance in the east.

== Background ==
On June 25, 1998, Acarlar Floodplain Forest was registered as a protected natural area by the Committee on Conservation of Cultural and Natural Assets in Bursa on its all coverage of 2,800 ha (6,900 acres). The lagoon's area decreased about 40%, 9,443 km^{2} (3,646 sq mi), after the discharge stream Okçu Creek was widened and turned into a canal by the local authority for soil and water in 1971. To protect pheasant and water birds, a partial area covering 1,576 ha (3,890 acres) was registered a wildlife conservation area in 1976 that is the only one of its sort in Sakarya Province. It was enlarged to 2,517 ha (6,220 acres) in 2004, and its status was improved to wildlife development area. The area was designated as a wetland of special importance in accordance with Ramsar Convention on April 2, 2009.

== Ecosystem ==
Acarlar Floodplain Forest is habitat for some endemic flora and fauna. The area is particularly a breeding and overwintering place for migratory birds.

=== Flora ===
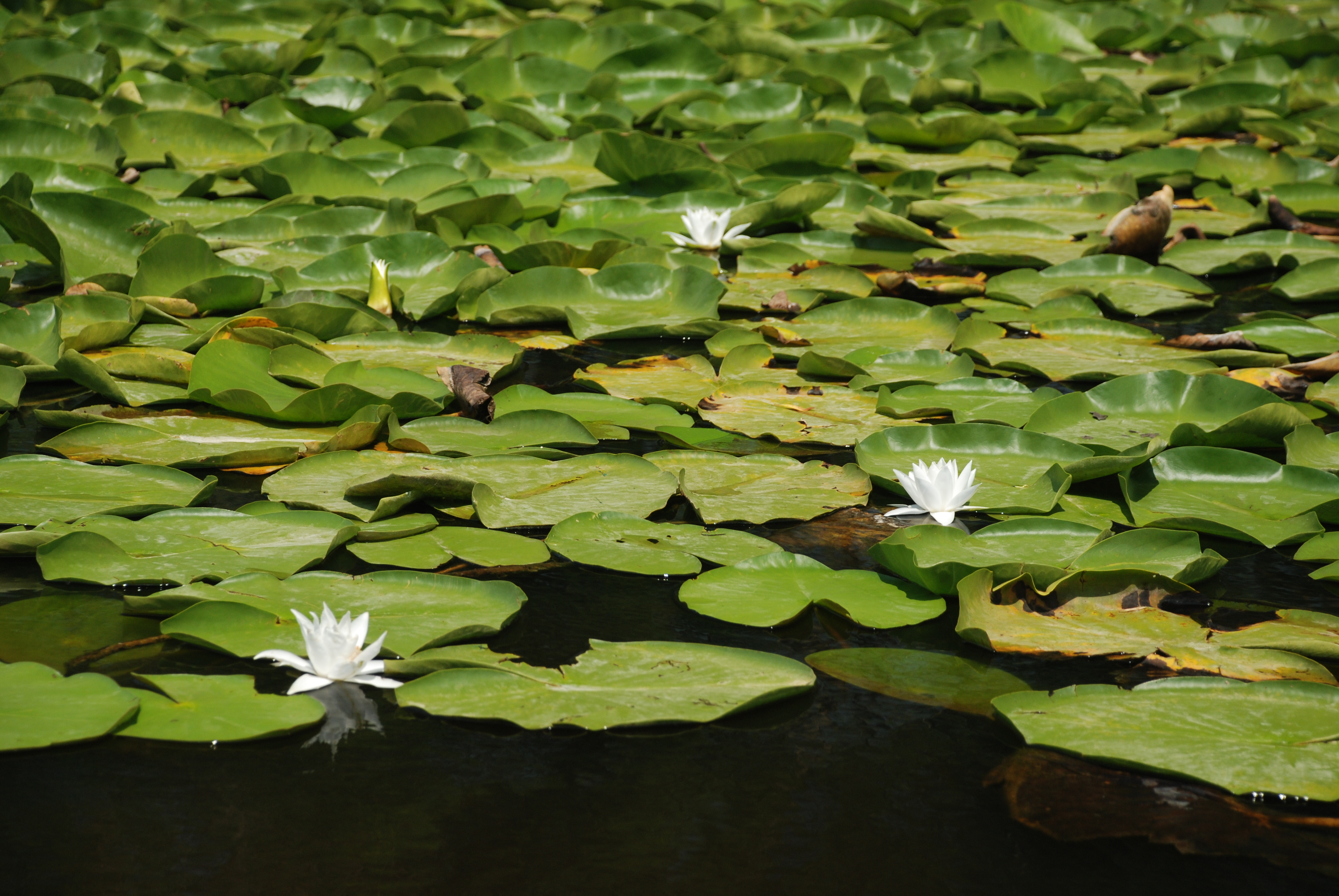
Water violet (Hottonia palustris) on the lagoon.

The aquatic plant water violet (Hottonia palustris) is endemic to Acarlar Floodplain. The rare plant species loddon lily or summer snowflake (Leucojum aestivum), which is used for treatment of polio, is traded by the villagers of Kaynarca.

The floodplain is habitat for more than 150 tree species. It is surrounded by forests of mainly common ash (Fraxinus excelsior). Widespread trees in the forest area are common alder (Alnus glutinosa), willow (Salix), common beech (Fagus sylvatica) and elm.

=== Fauna ===
Catfish, roach, carp and pike are some freshwater species found in the lagoon. Common mammals are hare, fox, wild boar, weasel and squirrel. A total of 235 bird species were observed in the protected area, including pheasant, Eurasian woodcock, wild duck, and as bird of prey, hawk.

=== Environmental threats ===
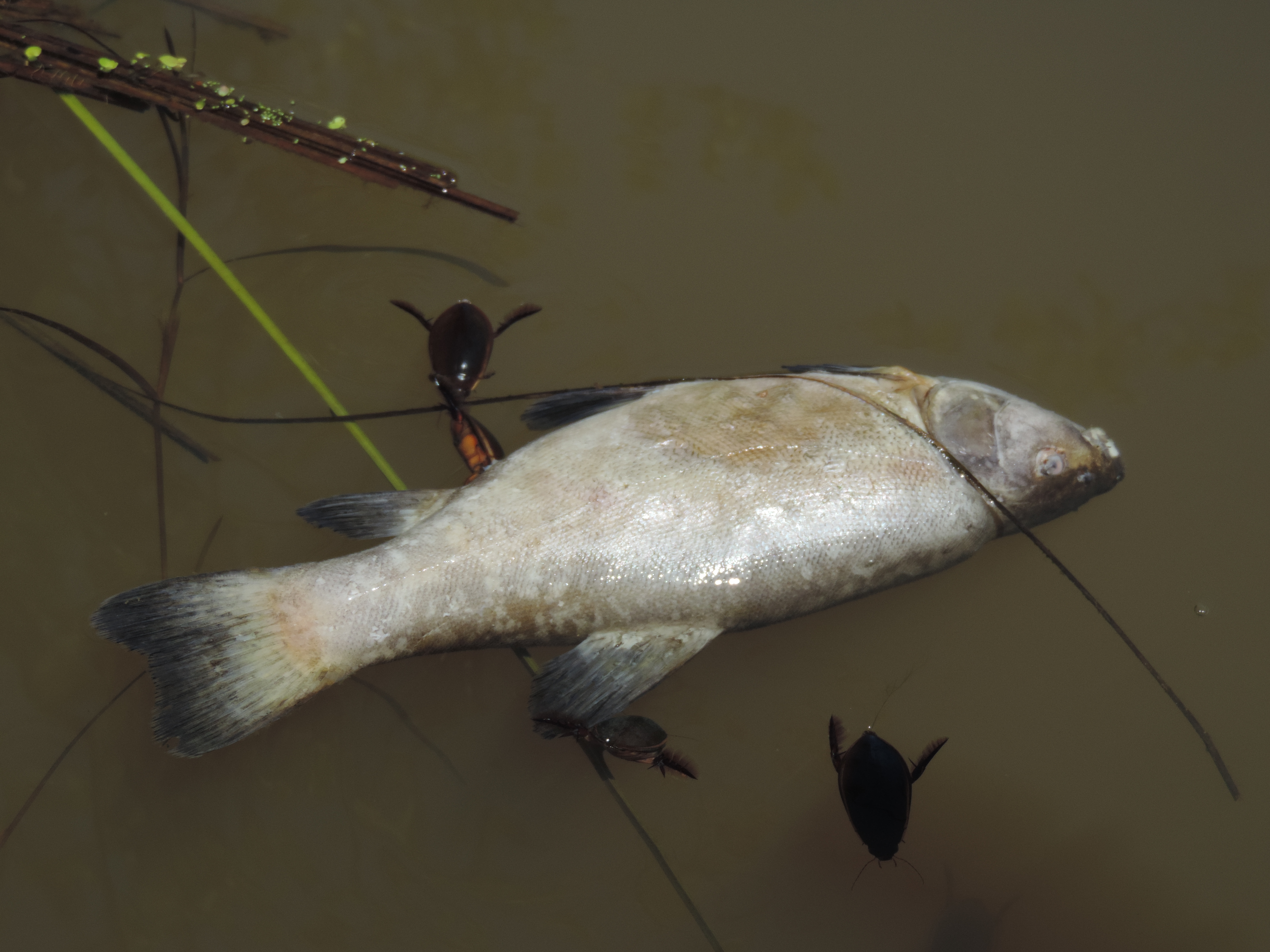
Fish death due to pollution in the floodplain.

Waste water from the eight villages around the floodplain may flow into the lagoon. The excessive use of fertilizer and pesticides in agriculture around the area increases the chemical inlet. Efforts are made to clear a piece of land around for doing agriculture. Illegal logging and poaching has to be prevented. The water flow from the lagoon to Sakarya needs to be monitored, and any hindrance has to be removed. The area experience dense visitor traffic after its opening to tourism. Motorboat tours on the lagoon has to be banned as it harm the migratory birds during their brooding period.

In February 2015, the province governor of Sakarya forbid boating on the coastal sea, the lagoon and the canals by any type of watercraft including pedalo.

By November 2015, an environmental disaster occurred when one of the feeder streams to the floodplain was contaminated carrying red-colored foamed water. It was reported that fish died and the crop planted by villagers got poisoned.

The local Directorate of Forest and Water Management set a drone into service in 2016 to fight poachers by monitoring the protected area from the air.

== See also ==
- İğneada Floodplain Forests National Park
