= Demirköy, Kırklareli =

Demirköy
- Municipality
- Location within Turkey Location within Marmara
- Coordinates: 41°49′21″N 27°45′47″E
- Country: Turkey
- Province: Kırklareli
- District: Demirköy

Government
  - Mayor: Recep Gün (AKP)
- Elevation: 300 m (980 ft)
- Population (2022): 3,489
- Time zone: UTC+3 (TRT)
- Area code: 0288
- Climate: Cfb
- Website: www.demirkoy.bel.tr

Demirköy (Turkish: Demirköy, "iron village"; known as Малък Самоков, Malak Samokov in Bulgarian) is a town in Kırklareli Province, in the Marmara region of Turkey. It is the seat of Demirköy District. Its population is 3,489 (2022). The inhabitants are mainly descendants of Pomak Muslims from the village of Tisovo and other villages from the Greek side of the Chech region who were settled in Demirköy during the population exchange between Greece and Turkey in 1923/1924. Prior to that, the village was known as Samokov (Bulgarian: Самоков).

The mayor is Recep Gün, elected in 2019.

== Visitor attractions ==
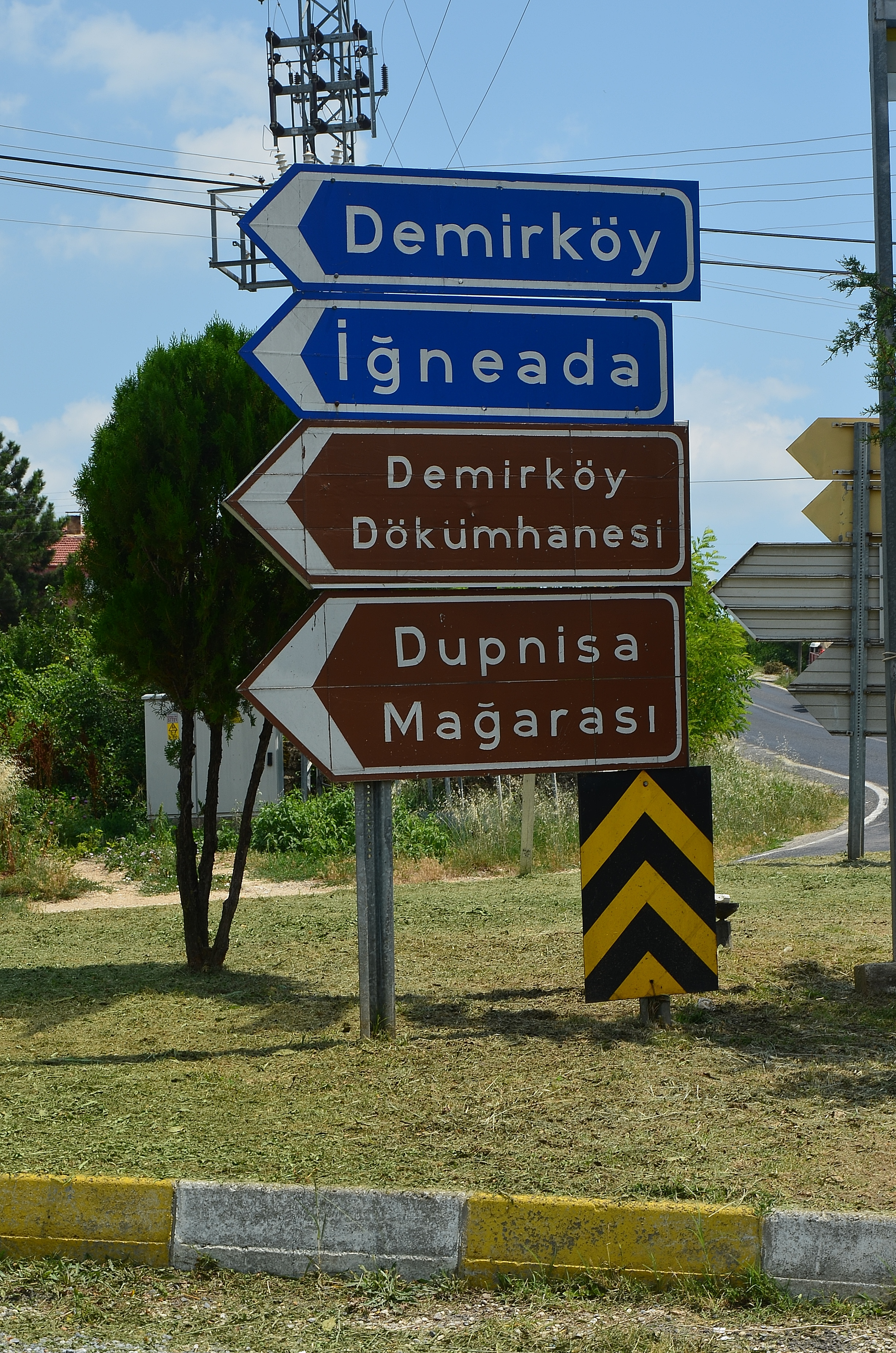
Directional road sign to visitor attractions in Demirköy.

A historic metalworking facility dating back to the 15th century, the Demirköy Foundry (Turkish: Demirköy Dökümhanesi), currently an archaeological site, is located 3.8 km (2.4 mi) southeast of Demirköy.

The Dupnisa Cave (Turkish: Dupnisa Mağarası) is a show cave located deep in the Strandzha forests 25 km (16 mi) southwest of the town.

The İğneada Floodplain Forests National Park (Turkish: İğneada Longoz Ormanları Milli Parkı) is at 25 km (16 mi) east of Demirköy near İğneada. The Lake Saka Nature Reserve is situated inside the national park.
