= Beğendik =

Beğendik is a Turkish place name and may refer to the following places in Turkey:

== Places ==
- Beğendik, Keşan, a town in the Keşan district of Edirne Province
- Beğendik, Demirköy, a village in the Demirköy district of Kırklareli Province
- Beğendik, Tercan
- Begendik, Olur

== Others ==
- Beğendik Bridge, a road bridge in southeastern Turkey
