= Beğendik, Demirköy =

Beğendik
- Village
- Location in Turkey Beğendik (Marmara)
- Coordinates: 41°58′N 28°01′E
- Country: Turkey
- Province: Kırklareli
- District: Demirköy
- Elevation: 20 m (66 ft)
- Population (2022): 255
- Time zone: UTC+3 (TRT)
- Postal code: 39500
- Area code: 0288

Beğendik (Greek: Άγιος Στέφανος, Bulgarian: Свети Стефан, romanized: Sveti Stefan, formerly Ayastefanos) is a village on the shore of the Yildiz Mountains in Demirköy District of Kırklareli Province, Turkey. Its population is 255 (2022). The village is situated close to the Black Sea shore and the Bulgarian border. The village was inhabited by Thracian Bulgarians until 1913, then re-settled by Balkan Turks. The village's distance to Demirköy is 39 kilometres (24 mi) and to Kırklareli is 113 kilometres (70 mi).

== Name ==
The name of the village Beğendik means "We liked it". According to tradition the village was in ruins. A high ranking man had visited the village and ordered to reconstruct it. Later during his second visit, the villagers asked his impression about the renewed village and the man said Beğendik ("We liked it").
