= İğneada Floodplain Forests National Park =

National park in Kırklareli, Turkey

- İğneada Longoz Ormanları Milli Parkı
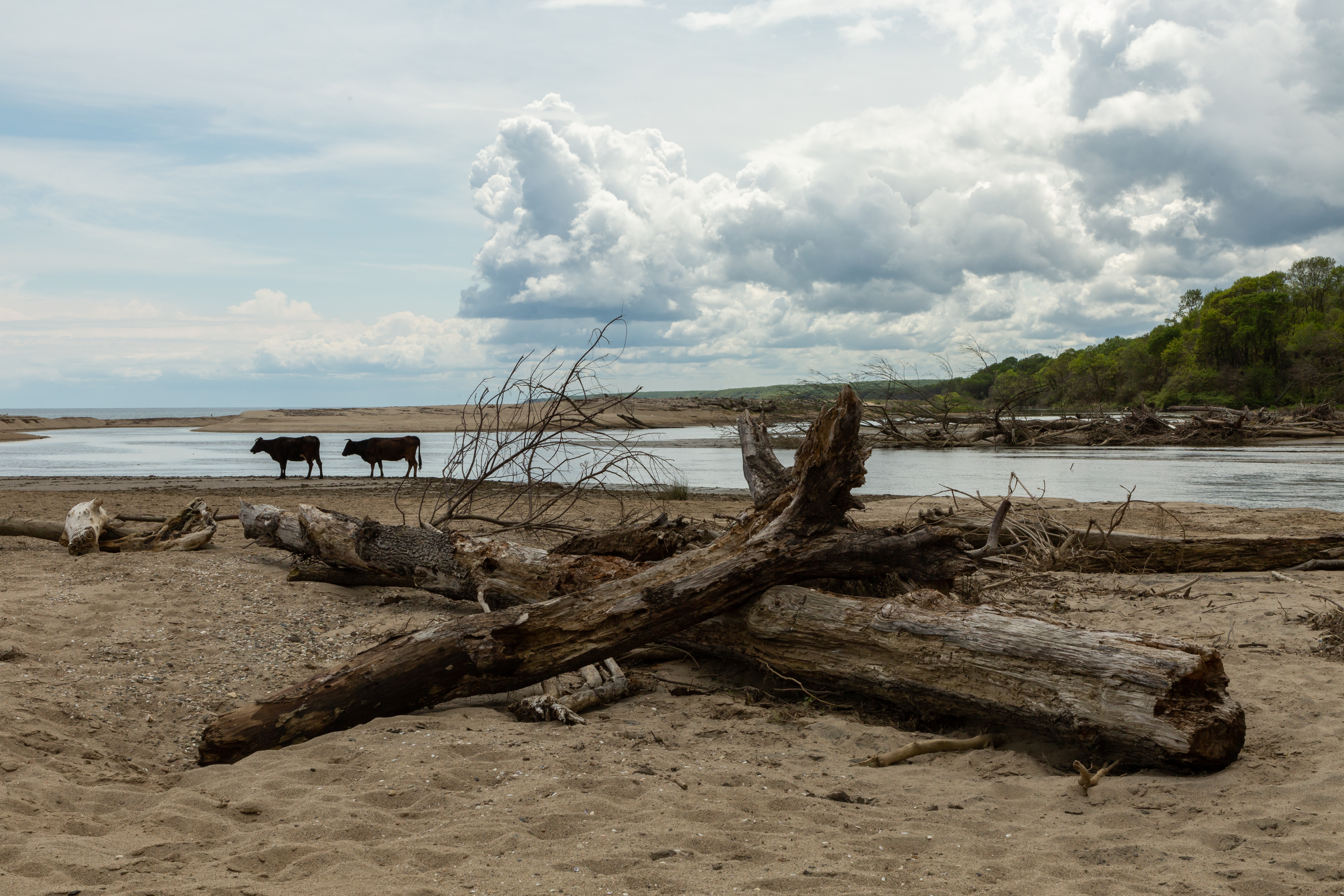

- Location within Turkey
- Location: Kırklareli Province, Turkey
- Nearest city: İğneada, Demirköy
- Coordinates: 41°49′10″N 27°57′14″E
- Area: 3,155 ha (7,800 acres)
- Established: November 13, 2007; 18 years ago
- Governing body: Directorate-General of Nature Protection and National Parks; Ministry of Environment and Forest

The İğneada Floodplain Forests National Park (Turkish: İğneada Longoz Ormanları Milli Parkı), established on November 13, 2007, is a national park located within Kırklareli Province in Marmara region at East Thrace, the European part of Turkey.

The national park covers an area of 3,155 ha (7,800 acres) and is located at İğneada town on the Turkish-Bulgarian border at 25 km (16 mi) far from Demirköy District of Kırklareli Province.

Streams running down from the Strandzha mountain range towards Black Sea formed alluvium on the shore, where floodplain (Turkish: longoz) occurred due to seasonal floodings.

The protected area is administered by the Directorate-General of Nature Protection and National Parks (Turkish: Doğa Koruma ve Milli Parklar Genel Müdürlüğü) of the Ministry of Environment and Forest.

The national park is a rare ecosystem, which consists of marsh, swamp, lakes and coastal sand dunes. The Strandzha mountain range is situated in the south and west. There are five lakes with aquatic plant. Lake Erikli covering 43 ha (110 acres) is a lagoon, which gets separated from the sea in the summer months as a result of drought. Lake Mert of 266 ha (660 acres) area is formed by Çavuşdere creek at its mouth. Lake Saka is a small lake of 5 ha (12 acres) situated in the south of the national park between the floodplain and the dunes. The two other lakes are Lake Hamam of size 19 ha (47 acres) and Lake Pedina of 10 ha (25 acres). The sand dunes are situated on both sides of İğneada town. The dunes in the north stretch out from east of Lake Erikli to İğneada. The southern dunes run from the Lake Mert's sea connection to the south of Lake Saka, reaching a width of 50–60 m (160–200 ft) at some places.

== Ecosystem ==
=== Flora ===
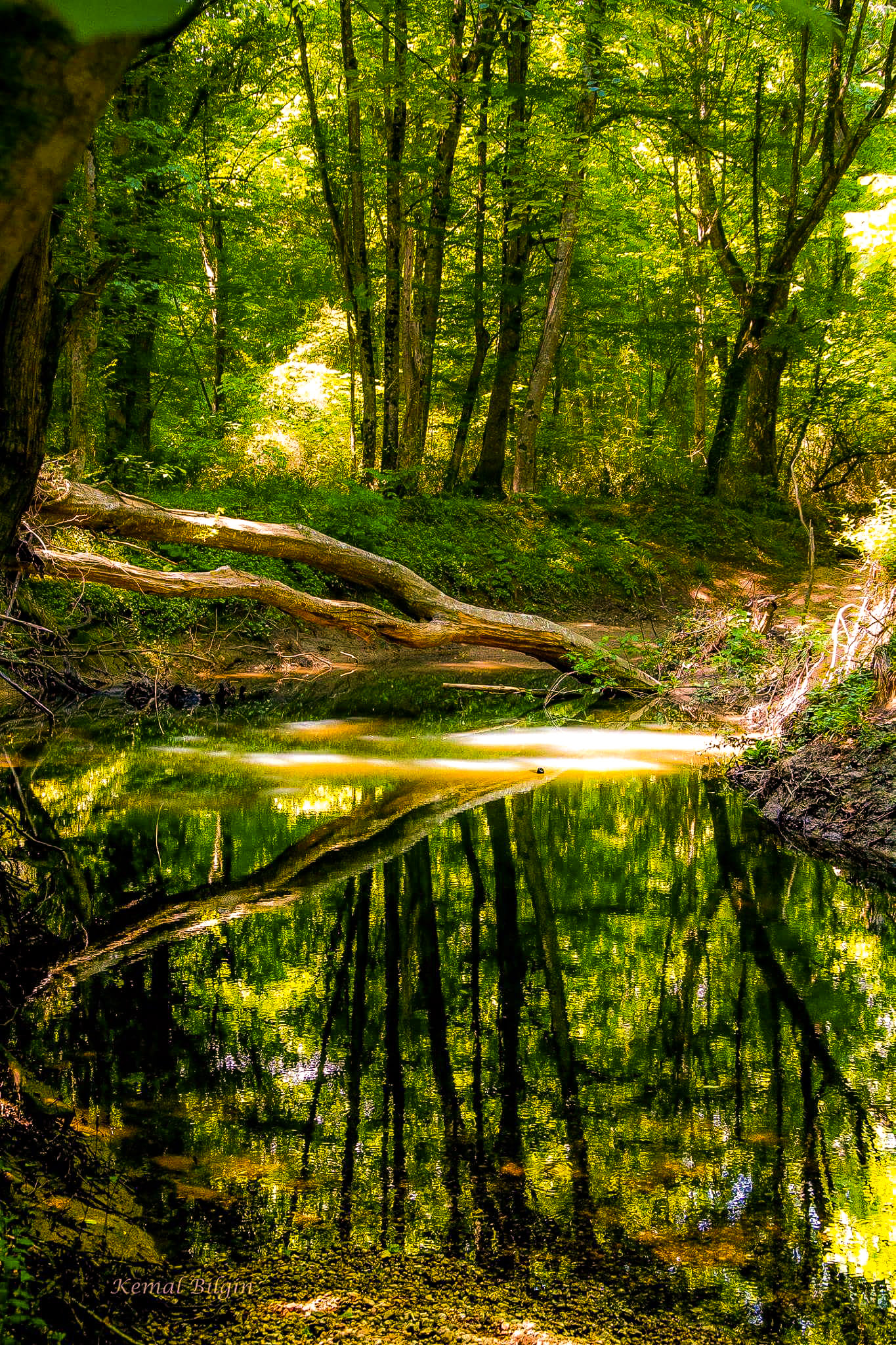
A view from the national park.

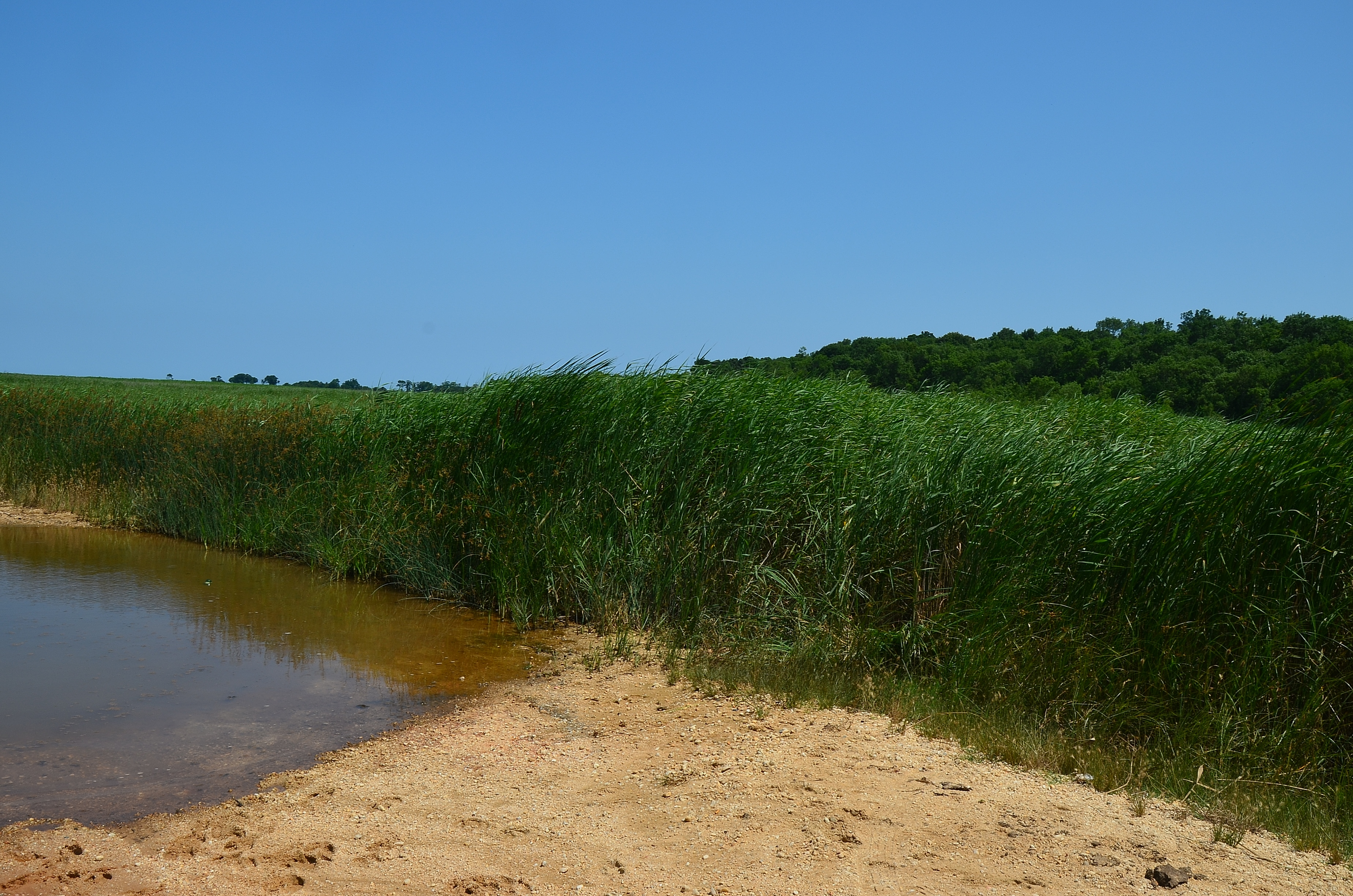
Sandy lakeshore, typha and wood in the background in the national park.

The 10 km (6.2 mi) long dunes with the plant species, unique to the southwestern Black Sea region, are of great importance. The flora of dunes in the belt between the lakes, marsh and the sea are under protection by international agreement. The national park is also habitat for swamp and non-evergreen mixed wood. Vine species are the most distinct plants of the forest. Sprecies of European ash (Fraxinus excelsior), oak (Quercus), alder (Alnus), beech (Fagaceae) and maple (Aceraceae) are trees found in the national park forest.

=== Fauna ===
Trout (Oncorhynchus), smelt (Osmeridae), grey mullet (Mugilidae) are fish species of the national park.

Birds like white-tailed eagle (Haliaeetus albicilla), European green woodpecker (Picus viridis), owl (Strigiformes), grey heron (Ardea cinerea), European cuckoo (Cuculus canorus), kingfisher (Coraciiformes), black stork (Ciconia nigra)) and hoopoe (Upupa epops) are observed in the area.

Among the mammals are wildcat (Felis silvestris), wild boar (Sus scrofa), hare (Lepus), European pine marten (Martes martes), European badger (Meles meles), grey wolf (Canis lupus), deer (Cervidae), fox (Vulpes vulpes), European otter (Lutra lutra), yellow-necked mouse (Apodemus flavicollis), weasel (Mustela), big-eared bat (Micronycteris), and variegated skunk (Mephitis mephitis).

As reptiles Hermann's tortoise (Testudo hermanni), southern crested newt (Triturus karelinii), lizard (Lacertilia), asp (Vipera aspis), earringed water snake (Acrochordidae) are found in the area.

== Access ==
İğneada Floodplain Forests National Park can be reached by public transportation from Istanbul via Silivri, Çorlu, Lüleburgaz, Pınarhisar, Demirköy and İğneada. It is convenient to go from Istanbul over the motorway O.3 via Saray, Vize and then Poyralı, Demirköy and İğneada by car.

== See also ==
- Lake Saka Nature Reserve
- Acarlar Floodplain Forest
