= Hacıosman Wood Nature Reserve =

Nature reserve in Samsun Province, Turkey

- Location within Turkey
- Location: Çarşamba, Samsun Province, Turkey
- Coordinates: 41°15′10″N 36°31′41″E
- Area: 127 ha (310 acres)

Hacıosman Wood is a nature reserve in Çarşamba in Turkey. It was the first nature reserve in Turkey, notable for being rare bottomland forest. It is closed to the public, but studied by scientists.
