= Pomaks in Turkey =

Türkiye'deki Pomaklar

Total population
- 750,000

Regions with significant populations
- Eastern Thrace

Languages
- Bulgarian, Pomak, Turkish

Religion
- Sunni Islam

Related ethnic groups
- South Slavic Muslims (mainly Gorani and Torbeshi)

The Pomaks in Turkey refers to a Slavic Muslims, who speak Bulgarian language. They mostly live in Eastern Thrace, though some are also present in Anatolia.

== Numbers ==
Pomak-speaking population in Turkey
Year	As first language	As second language	Total	Turkey's population	% of total speakers
1935	32,661	8,380	41,041	16,157,450	0.25
1945	10,287	5,594	15,881	18,790,174	0.08
1950	36,612	0	36,612	20,947,188	0.17
1955	16,163	22,816	38,979	24,064,763	0.16
1960	24,098	28,602	52,700	27,754,820	0.19
1965	23,138	34,234	57,372	31,391,421	0.18

In the census of 1965, those who spoke Pomak as first language were proportionally numerous in Edirne (3.4%), Kırklareli (1.3%) and Çanakkale (1.0%).

== Language ==
The Pomaks of Turkey speak a Bulgarian dialect. According to Ethnologue at present 300,000 Pomaks in European Turkey speak Bulgarian as mother tongue. It is very hard to estimate the number of Pomaks along with the Turkified Pomaks who live in Turkey, as they have blended into the Turkish society and have been often linguistically and culturally assimilated. According to Milliyet and Turkish Daily News reports, the number of the Pomaks along with the Turkified Pomaks in the country is about 600,000.
