= Demirköy District =

District of Kırklareli Province, Turkey

- District
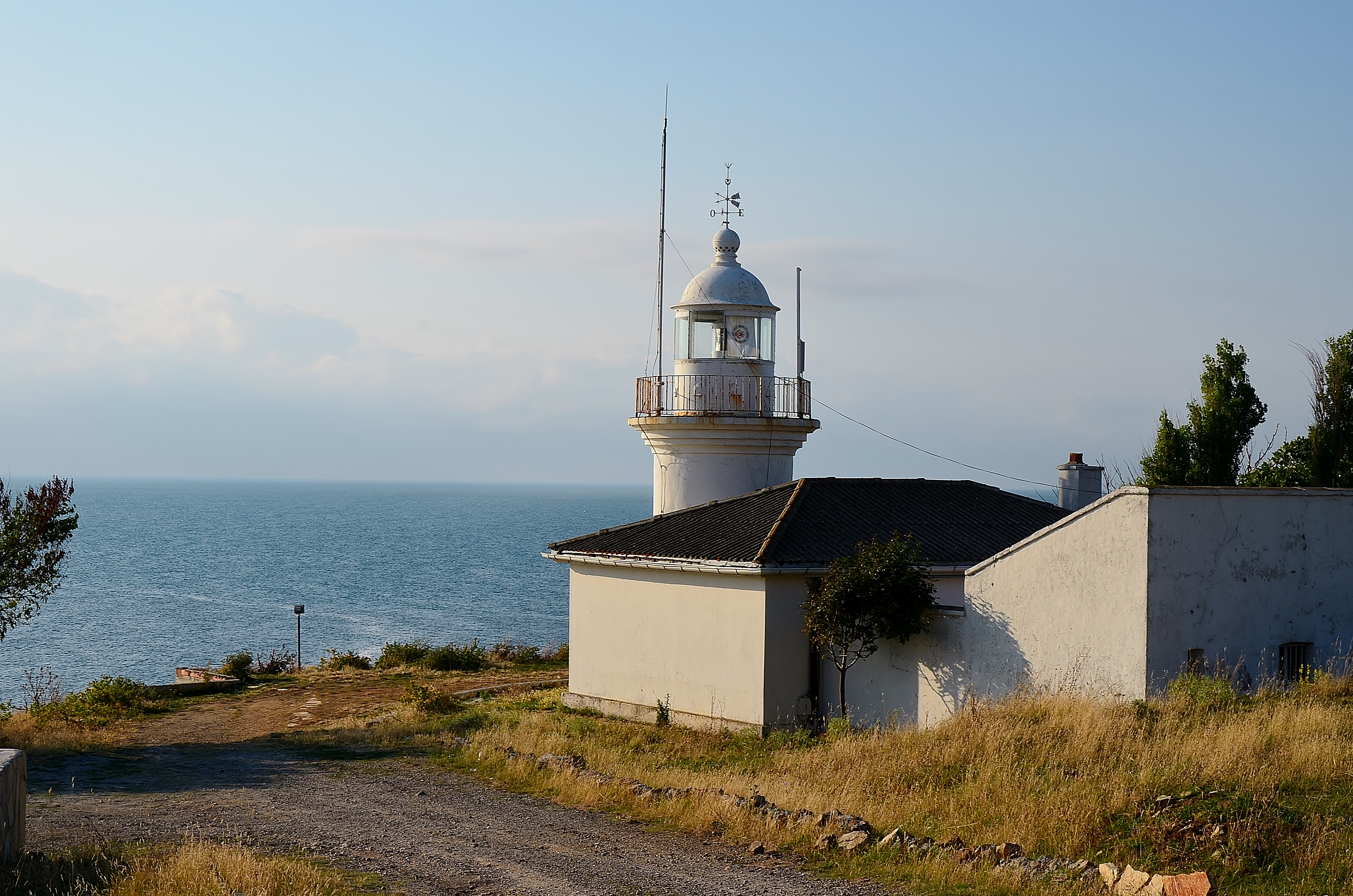
- Limanköy Lighthouse

- Map showing Demirköy District in Kırklareli Province

- Location within Turkey Location within Marmara
- Coordinates: 41°49′N 27°46′E
- Country: Turkey
- Province: Kırklareli
- Seat: Demirköy

Government
  - Kaymakam: Yaşar Şimşek
- Area: 893 km^{2} (345 sq mi)
- Population (2022): 8,961
  - Density: 10.0/km^{2} (26.0/sq mi)
- Time zone: UTC+3 (TRT)
- Website: www.demirkoy.gov.tr

Demirköy District is a district of the Kırklareli Province of Turkey. Its seat is the town of Demirköy at the Istranca/Yildiz Mountains at the foot of the Mahya Dağı. Its area is 893 km^{2}, and its population is 8,961 (2022). The population of different background merged, and are now called simple Hill people (Dağlılar). It was a significant industrial hub in the 15th century due to its iron and copper ore processing, with the Demirköy foundry supplying cannonballs for the ottoman conquest of Istanbul in 1453.

== Demirköy Mountains ==
- Mahya Dağı (1031 m) is the Highest mountain, followed by:
- Karamanbayır Tepesi (995 m)
- Boyunduruk Tepesi (973 m)
- Fatmakaya Tepesi (901 m)
- Kaynak Tepesi (898 m)
- Paraşüt Tepesi (883 m)
- Meşe Tepesi (872 m)
- Haydut Tepesi (860 m)
- Sivritepe (851 m)
- Kaletepe (846 m)
- Bıçkı Tepesi (726 m)
- Çavuştepe (726 m)
- Dalyantepe (725 m)
- Karakoltepe (719 m)
- Bocalar Tepe (680 m)
- Ceviz Tepe (675 m)
- Yangınkulesi Tepe (629 m)
- Yeltepe (618 m)
- Topkoru Tepe (592 m)
- Soğuksu Tepesi (567 m)
- Büyükbezirgan Tepe (412 m)
- Kocataş Tepesi (281 m)
- Koca Tepe (207 m)
