= Edirne Museum =

Museum in Edirne, Turkey

- Edirne Müzesi
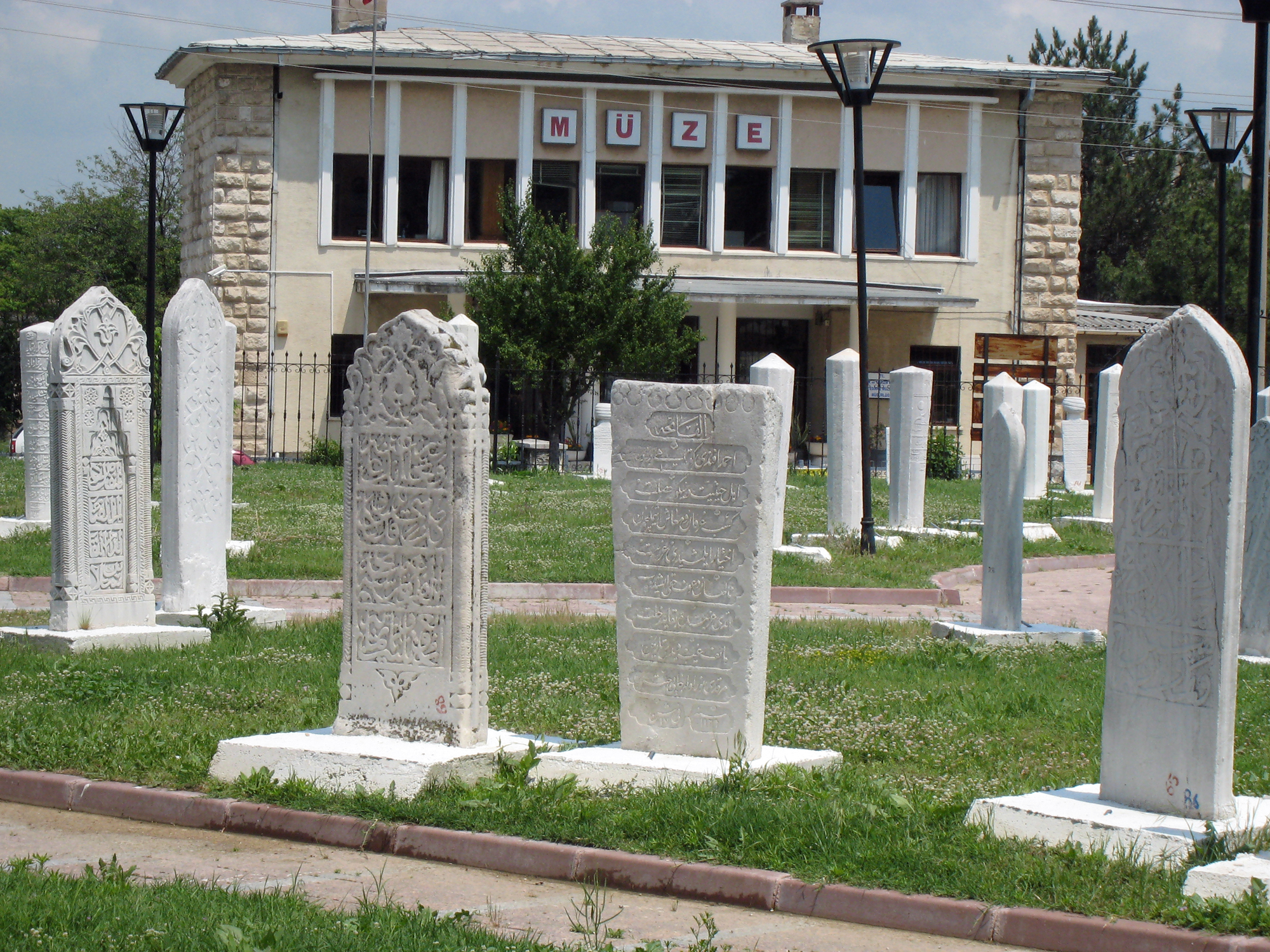
- Graveyards and the museum building

- Edirne Museum
- Established: 1971; 55 years ago
- Location: Kadir Paşa mektep sok, Edirne, Turkey
- Coordinates: 41°40′44″N 26°33′38″E
- Type: Archaeology, Ethnography
- Collections: Chalcolithic Age, Hellenistic period, Roman Empire, Byzantine Empire, Ottoman Empire
- Owner: Ministry of Culture and Tourism
- Website: Edirne Museum page (in Turkish)

Edirne Museum is in Edirne, Turkey

== Location ==
The museum is in the center of Edirne on Kadirpaşa Mektep street. It is next to the famous Selimiye Mosque at 41°40′44″N 26°33′38″E.

== History ==
The museum was established in 1925 in a medrese of the Selimiye Mosque with instruction of Atatürk by Dr. Rifat Osman, Arif Dağdeviren and Necmi İğe. Although it was originally planned as an archaeology museum, it also contained many ethnographic items. On 25 November 1936 (the 13th anniversary of the liberation of Edirne following the Turkish War of Independence) a second medrese building was added to the museum. On 13 June 1971 the museum was moved to the new museum building which was built next to former building. The architect of the new building was İhsan Kıygı. (The medrese building was redesigned as an Islamic art museum.)

== The archaeology section ==
The first displays are about the Paleontology. Bones of elephant, rhinoceros and horse are displayed (currently elephant and rhinoceros are extinct from Turkey). Among the archaeological displays there are some remains from the Chalcolithic age. But the Majority of the items are from the Hellenistic, Roman and Byzantine Empire ages. Especially the terra-cotta Aphrodite figurines are notable. There are also funerary steles of Thracians

== The ethnography section ==
This section includes mostly items from the Turkish age, including the carpets in the bride and circumcision rooms, closets and various clothing. There are special sections for the hamam ("Turkish bath") and the living room of a typical old Edirne house.
