= Mount Mahya =

Mountain in Turkey

- Mahya Dağı, Махиада
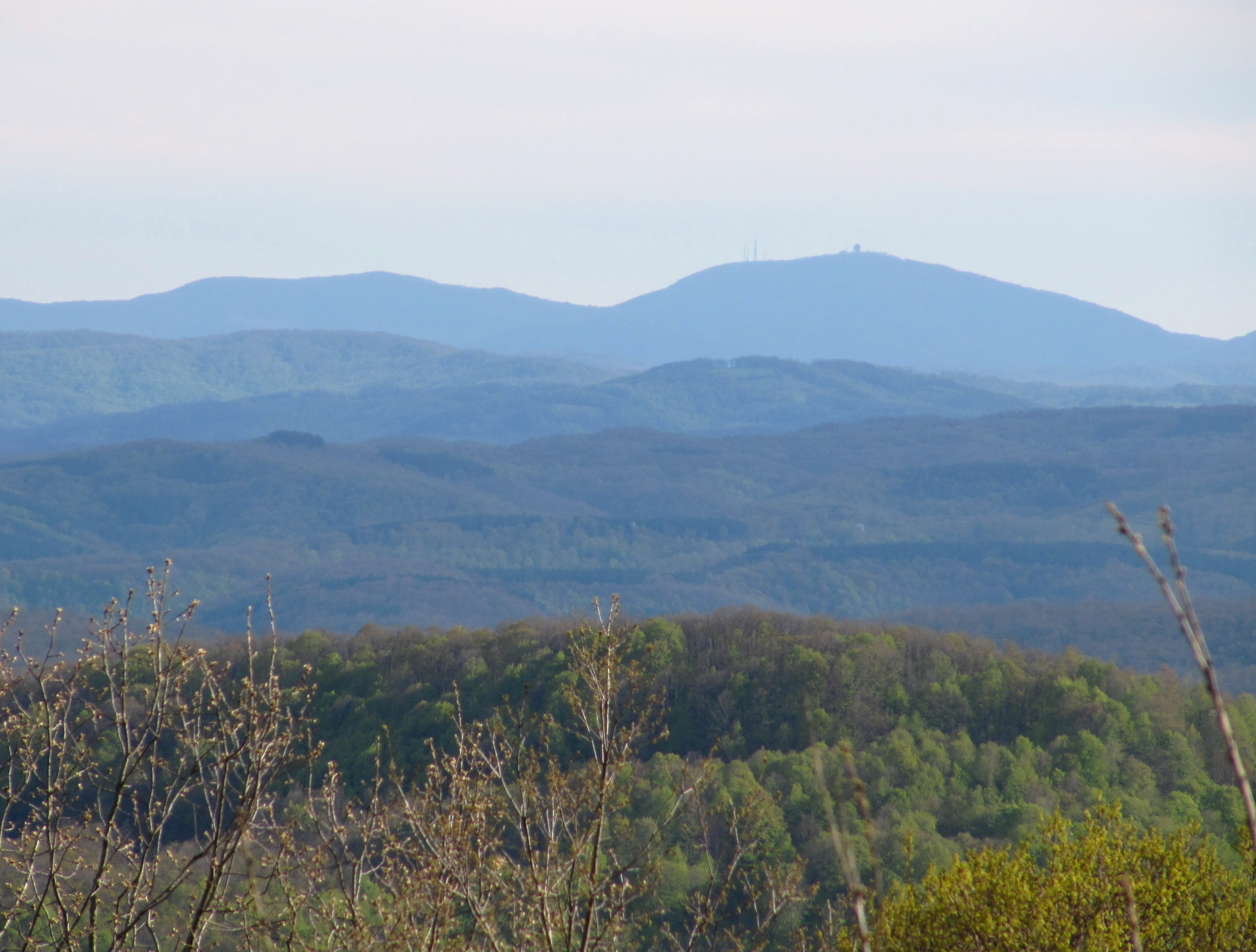
- View of Mount Mahya from Bulgaria. Picture taken at about 34.9 km (21.7 mi) from almost straight northern direction.

Highest point
- Elevation: 1,031 m (3,383 ft)
- Coordinates: 41°47′N 27°37′E

Geography
- Location within Turkey
- Location: Turkey
- Parent range: Strandzha (Yıldız Mountains)

Mount Mahya (Turkish: Mahya Dağı; Bulgarian: Махиада, romanized: Mahiada) (1031 m) is a mountain peak in Turkey. It is the highest peak of the Strandzha Massif (Yıldız Mountains) and also the European part of Turkey.

Mount Ararat is the highest point in Turkey as a whole.
