= Committee on Conservation of Cultural Assets in Turkey =

Turkish governmental committee

The Committee on Conservation of Cultural Assets in Turkey (Turkish: Kültür Varlıkları Koruma Kurulu) is a province-based governmental committee responsible for the conservation of cultural heritage in Turkey.

== History ==
In 1933, a department was founded within the Ministry of National Education for the conservation of the ruins of antiquity. After the establishment of the Ministry of Culture and Tourism in 1971, the department became an office of this new ministry. Following a series of name changes, finally in 2003, it was renamed "Cultural Assets and Museums Department" (Turkish: Kültür Varlıkları ve Müzeler Genel Müdürlüğü). The Committees on Conservation of Cultural Assets are province-based subdivisions of this department at the ministry.

== List of committees ==
Currently, there are 34 provincial committees:

- Adana
- Ankara (1-2)
- Antalya
- Aydın
- Balıkesir
- Bursa
- Çanakkale
- Diyarbakır
- Edirne
- Erzurum
- Eskişehir
- Gaziantep
- İstanbul (1-6)
- İzmir (1-2)
- Karabük
- Kars
- Kayseri
- Kocaeli
- Konya
- Kütahya
- Muğla
- Nevşehir
- Samsun
- Sivas
- Şanlıurfa
- Trabzon
- Van
