= Amuca tribe =

The Amuca tribe (Turkish: Amuca Kabilesi) is one of the nomadic Yörüks who belong to the Oghuz Turks tribes of the Ottoman Empire, which moved from Anatolia to the Balkans. At the end of 14th century, the tribe established a settled life in Ottoman Thrace. The first village they founded, was Keşirlik, located in the Mahya Dağı.

Today some of the Amuca tribe live in Kırklareli Province.
