= Lake Saka Nature Reserve =

Nature reserve in Kırklareli Province, Turkey

- Location within Turkey
- Location: Sivriler, Demirköy, Kırklareli, Turkey
- Nearest city: İğneada
- Coordinates: 41°47′55″N 27°59′25″E
- Area: 1,345 ha (3,320 acres)

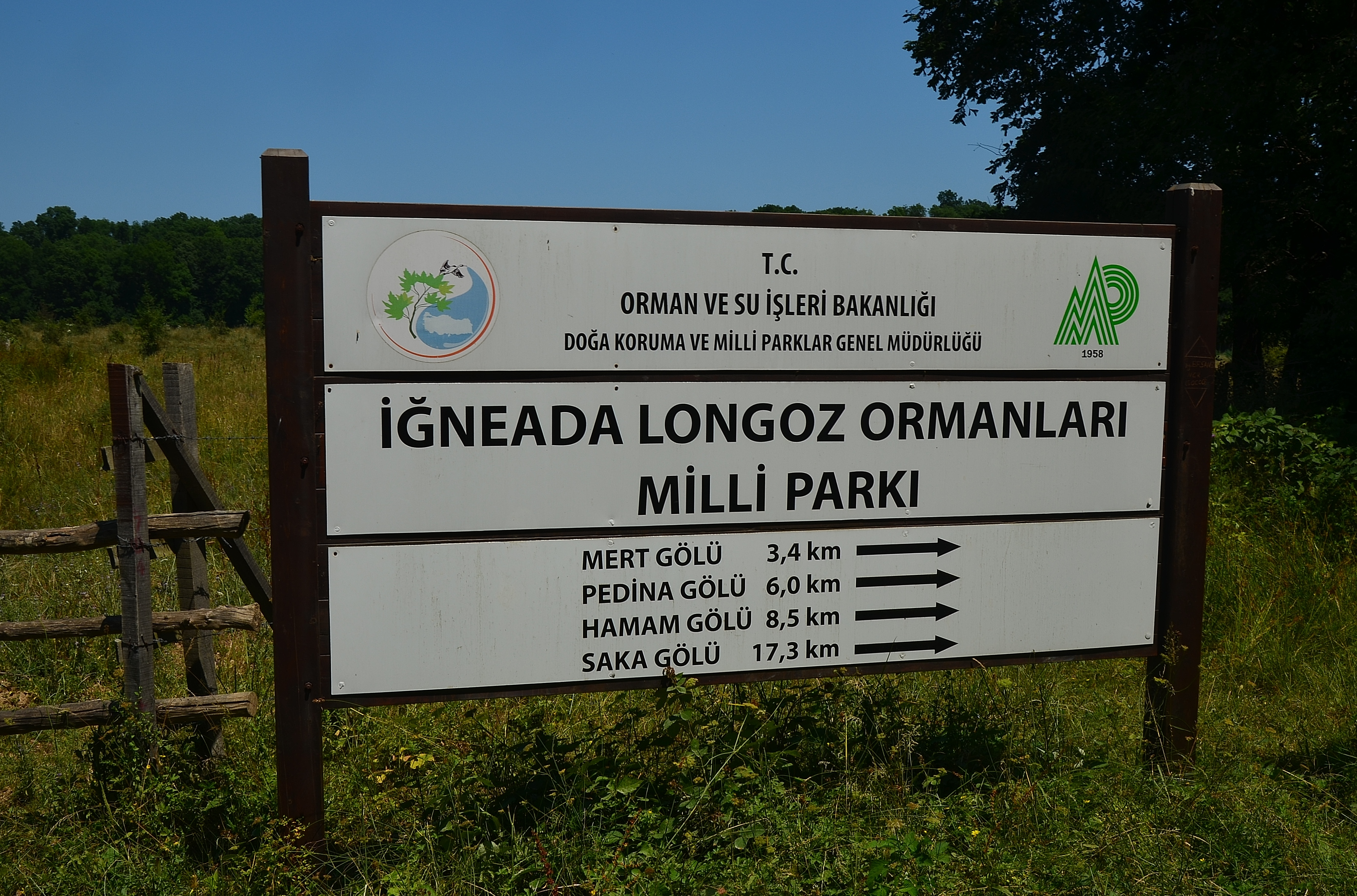
Directional road sign for Lake Saka at the entrance of İğneada Floodplain Forests National Park near İğneada.

The Lake Saka Nature Reserve (Turkish: Saka Gölü Tabiatı Koruma Alanı) is a nature reserve at Sivriler village of Demirköy district in Kırklareli Province of Turkey close to İğneada on the Black Sea coast. It gets its name from the Lake Saka (Turkish: Saka Gölü), which is in the boundaries of the İğneada Floodplain Forests National Park. It is 26 km (16 mi) from Demirköy, and 19 km (12 mi) from İğneada.

It covers an area of 1,345 ha (3,320 acres). The sits is on a floodplain of a river that flows into the Black Sea, and seasonally floods thus rendering it a unique and one of the very few remaining floodplain forests in all of Europe.

== Flora ==
In addition to the main flora of alder (Alnus), elm (Ulmus) and ash (Fraxinus), trees such as oak (Quercus), hornbeam (Carpinus), beech (Fagaceae), black poplar (Populus nigra), white poplar (Populus alba), willow (Salix), linden (Tilia) and walnut (Juglans) are found in the nature reserve.

== Fauna ==
The fauna of the protected area consists of the mammals: deer (Cervidae), roe deer (Capreolus capreolus), fox (Canidae), gray wolf ((Canis lupus), hare (Lepus), wild boar (Sus scrofa), wildcat (Felis silvestris) and the birds swan (Cygnus), mallard (Anas platyrhynchos), greylag goose (Anser anser), woodcock (Scolopax) and common wood pigeon (Columba palumbus). The nature reserve is habitat for the reptiles such as viper (Viperidae), slow-worm (Anguis fragilis) and water snake. The lake is home to the fish species of carp (Cyprinidae), red seabream, bass (Perciformes) as well as to crustaceans like crayfish.
