= Crimean Tatars in Turkey =

Crimean Tatars in Turkey Türkiyedeki Qırımtatarlar Türkiye'deki Kırım Tatarları
Total population
- Estimates greatly vary, up to 6,000,000.

Languages
- Crimean Tatar, Turkish

Religion
- Sunni Islam (Hanafi)

Crimean Tatars in Turkey refers to citizens and denizens of Turkey who are, or descend from, the Tatars of Crimea.

== Numbers ==
Crimean Tatar-speaking population in Turkey
Year	As first language	As second language	Total	Turkey's population	% of total speakers
1927	11,465	0	11,465	13,629,488	0.08
1935	15,615	4,106	19,721	16,157,450	0.12
1945	10,047	2,255	12,302	18,790,174	0.07

== History ==
Before the 20th century, Crimean Tatars had immigrated from Crimea to Turkey in three waves: First, after the Russian annexation of Crimea in 1783; second, after the Crimean War of 1853–56; third, after the Russo-Turkish War of 1877–78.
