= Kırklareli Museum =

National museum in Turkey

- Kırklareli Müzesi
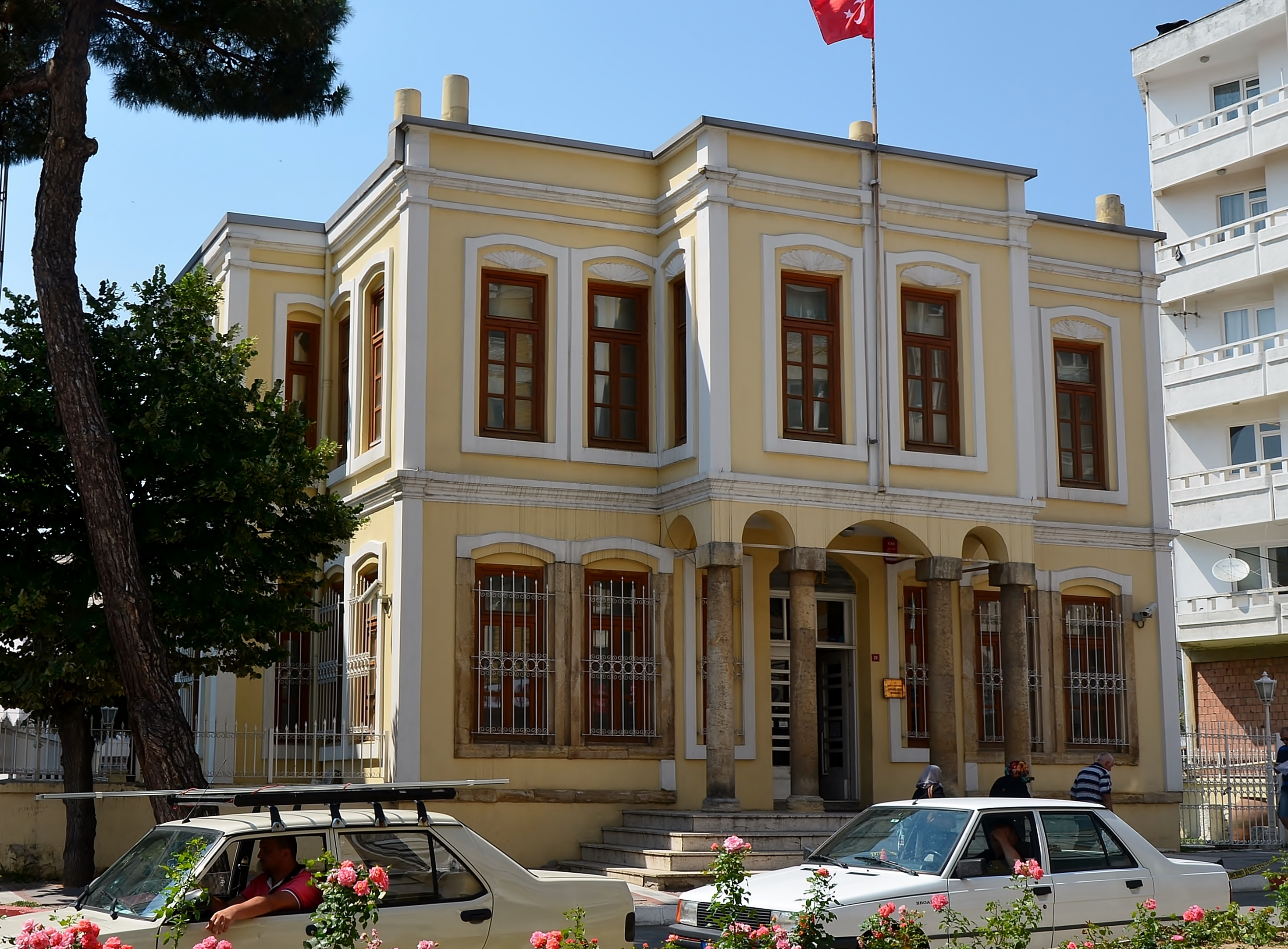
- Kırklareli Museum building

- Location in Turkey
- Established: 1993; 33 years ago
- Location: Mustafa Kemal Bulvarı 26, Kırklareli
- Coordinates: 41°44′01″N 27°13′29″E
- Type: Natural history museum, Archaeology museum, Ethnographic museum
- Collection size: 3,507
- Visitors: 2013: 9,362 (417 foreigners); 2014: 9,066 (535 foreigners)
- Director: Derya Balkan
- Website: Museum Facebook page

Kırklareli Museum (Turkish: Kırklareli Müzesi) is a national museum in Kırklareli, Turkey, exhibiting natural history specimens, ethnographical items related to the region's history of cultural life, and archaeological artifacts found in and around the city. The director of the museum is Derya Balkan.

== Description ==
The museum's building was constructed for Mutasarrıf (Governor) Neşet Pasha and mayor Hacı Mestan Efendi in 1894. It was used as the municipality office until 1962. In the 1970s, the building was vacated and left to decay. In 1983, restoration of the building began and continued with interruptions, until it was completed in 1993 and opened as a museum.

The museum is a two-story building with a basement. The reinforced concrete building has arch-like windows on all four sides. A bay window on the first floor, in the center of the building front, is supported by four columns flanking the main entrance. The museum consists of three sections for "culture and nature", "ethnography", and "archaeology". The museum has a total of 3,507 registered items, including 1,882 coins, 1,110 archaeological artifacts, and 515 items related to ethnography.

The museum serves as a center for historic research of the region, as well as collaboration with scientific institutions, assisting and guiding them. Its main duty is to register the natural and cultural properties in the region. Currently, the register lists a total of 269 preservations, including 98 archaeological sites, 3 urban sites, 13 natural reserve areas, and 155 single-building historic sites.

The museum is open seven days a week from 9:00–18:00 local time between April 15 and October 26. It is closed on Mondays. Access to the museum is free of charge. In 2013, a total of 9,362 people, including 417 foreign tourists, visited the museum. In 2014, the number of visitors was 9,066, of which 535 came from abroad.

Natural history section

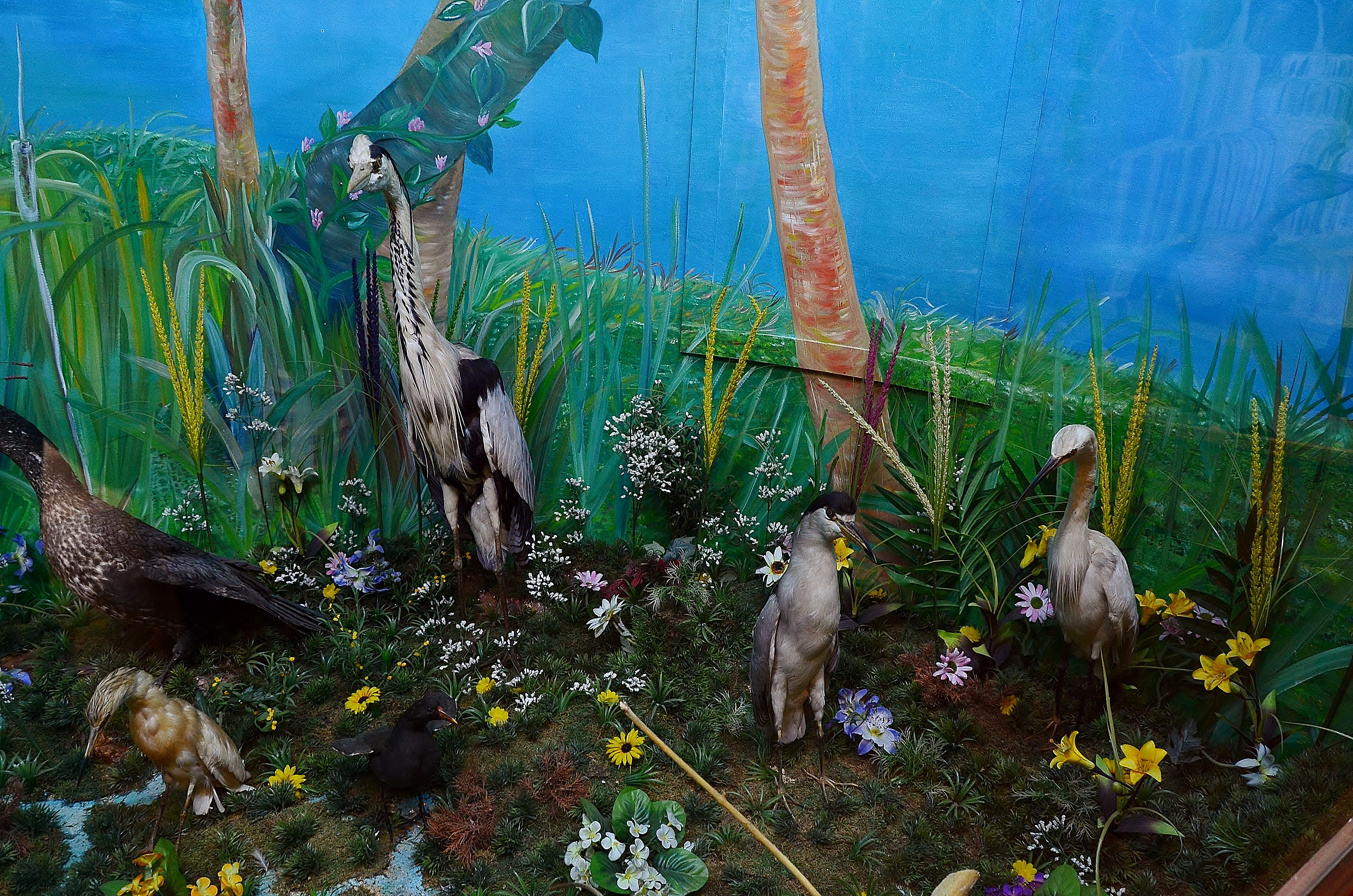
Some taxidermized bird species in the Natural history section

A large room on the first floor is reserved for the collection of natural history. A total of 102 species native to the region, including 76 taxidermized bird and mammal species, are on display in their natural environment. Some of the animals exhibited are extinct and some are endangered species. This section draws the interest of high school students, university biology students, and researchers.

Ethnography section

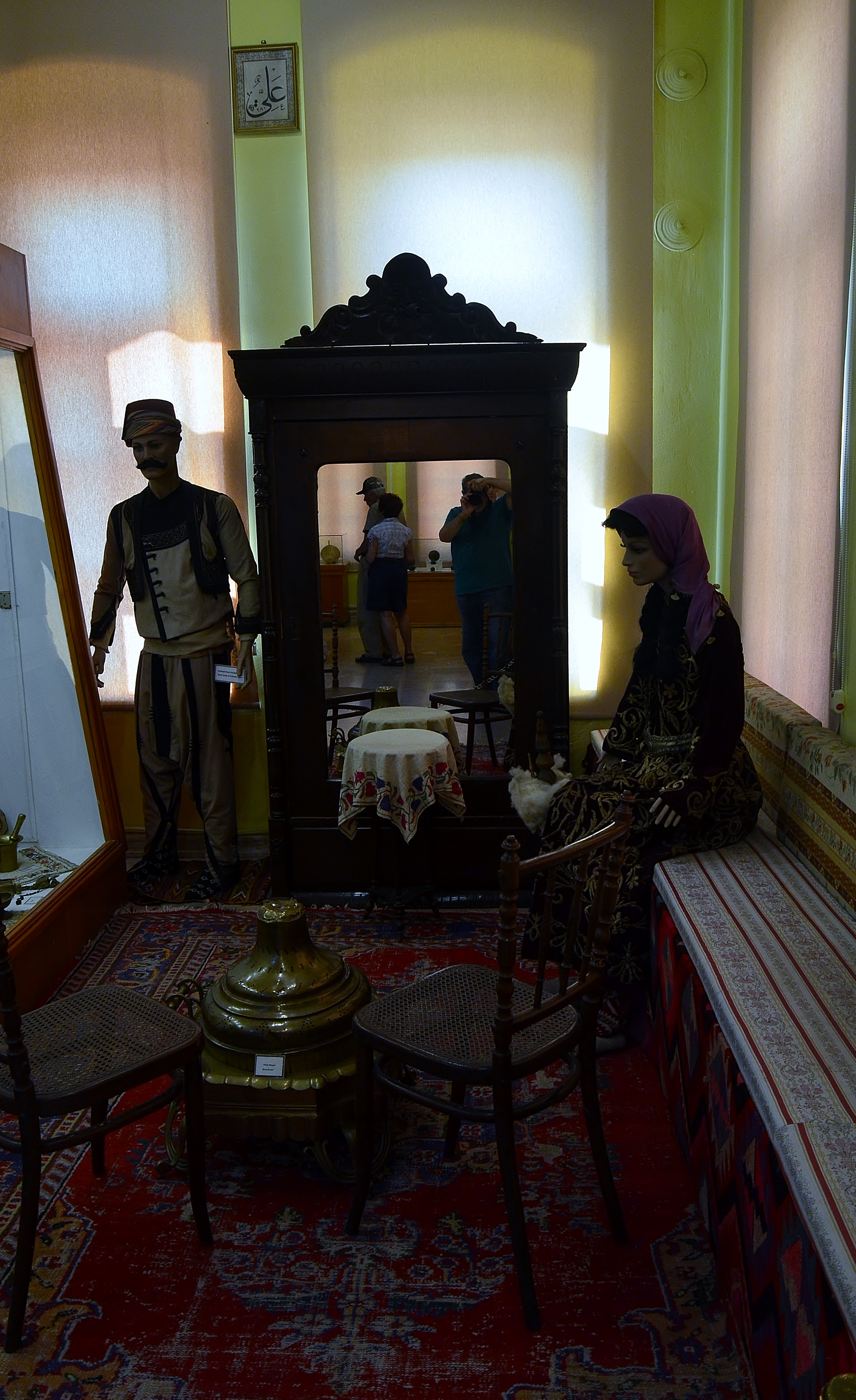
A typical household in the region

The exhibits of the ethnography section share the upper floor with the archaeology section. This section consists of 188 items depicting rural area life in the 19th and early 20th centuries, and of city life in Kırklareli in the same period. Carpets, clothes, jewellery, and household objects are on display.

Archaeology section

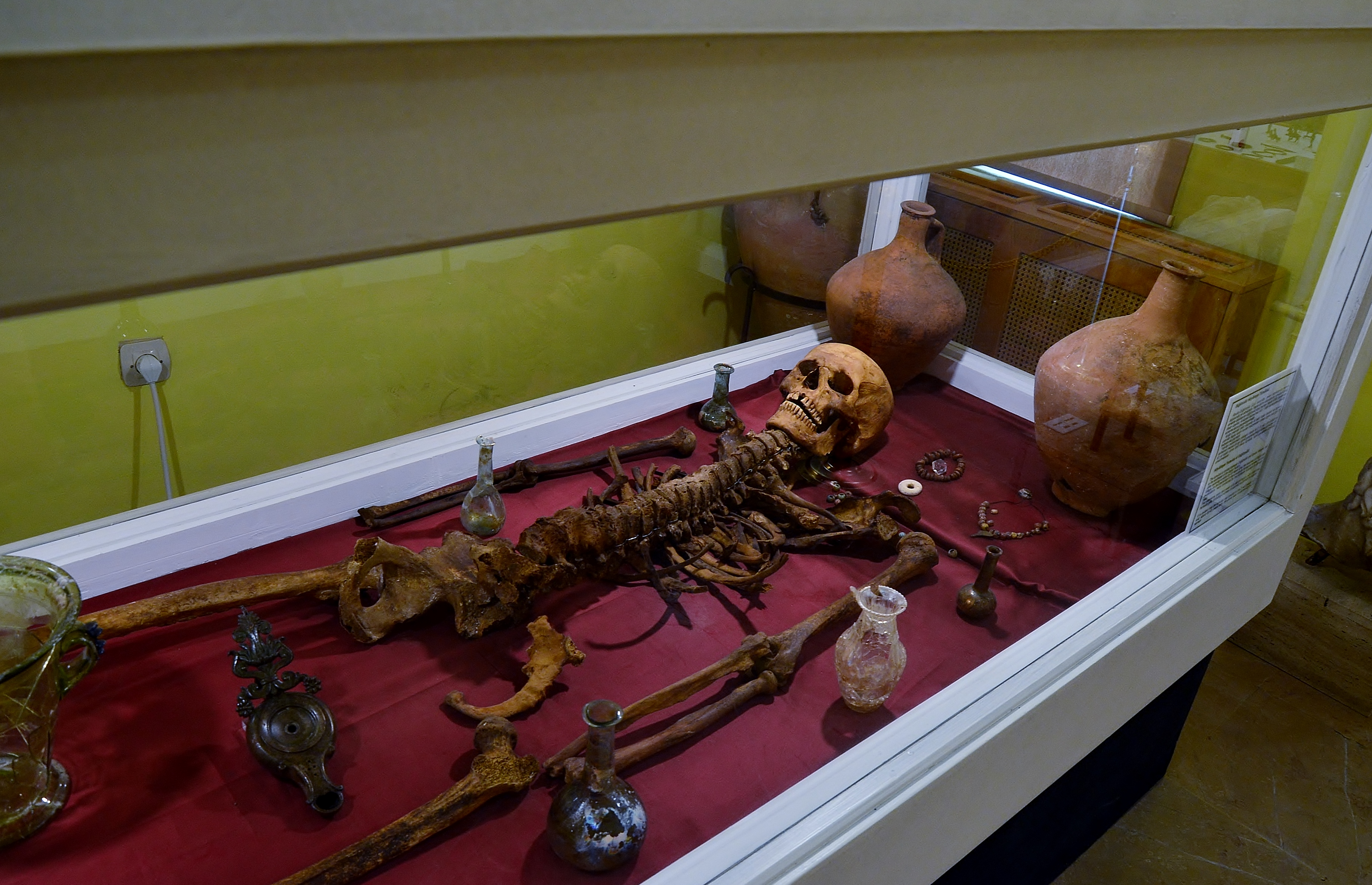
A human skeleton and grave goods, as found in a sarcophagus

The 236 archaeological artifacts are all excavated finds from sites around Kırklareli: in the settlements of Aşağıpınar, Kanlıgeçit, and Tilkiburnu; and in the tumuli of İslambeyli, Pınarhisar, Alpullu Höyüktepe, and Dolhan. There are fossils of marine and land species, and trees, spanning the time from the Holocene geological epoch to the era of Ancient Rome. There are archaeological artifacts from the Neolithic (New Stone Age), Chalcolithic (Copper Age), and Iron Age, as well as from the eras of Ancient Greece, Ancient Rome, Byzantine Empire, and Ottoman Empire.

A sample collection of 72 coins from Ancient Greece, Ancient Rome, Byzantine Empire, and Ottoman Empire is on exhibition. A life-size sculpture of a female human torso stands in the entrance hall on the ground floor. Marble reliefs from an amphitheatre of the Late Roman Empire (2nd century), unearthed between 1995 and 1997 in Vize, are exhibited on the staircase wall. Due to new archaeological finds unearthed at ongoing excavations and limited space in the museum, some archaeological items are interchanged from time to time.
