= Strandzha =

Mountain in Bulgaria and Turkey

Coordinates: 42°0′45″N 27°36′31″E

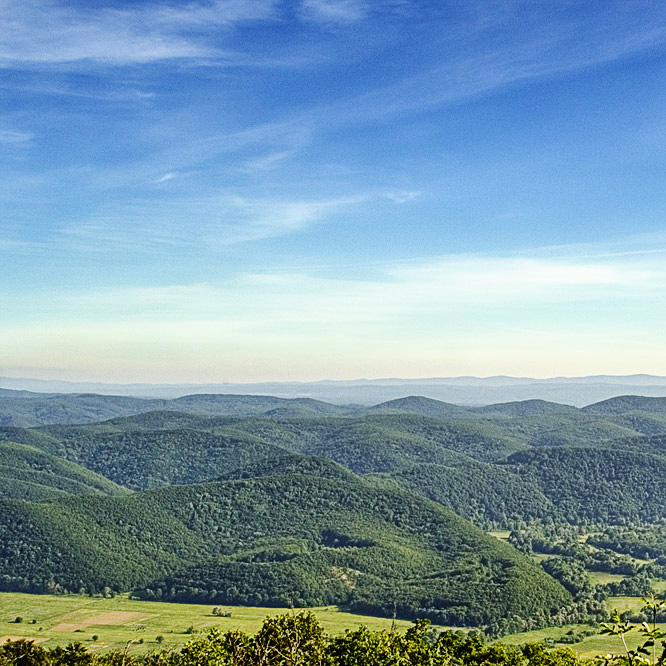
View from Papiya Peak (502 m or 1,647 ft) in Bulgarian Strandzha.

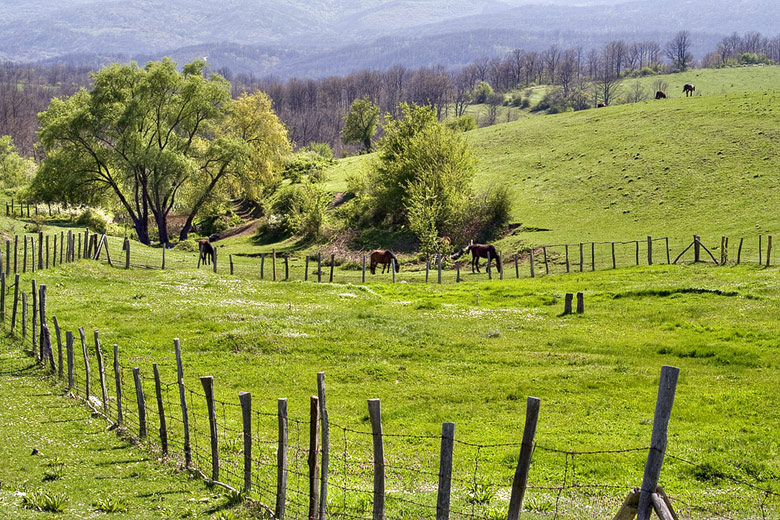
A landscape from the Bulgarian part of Strandzha.

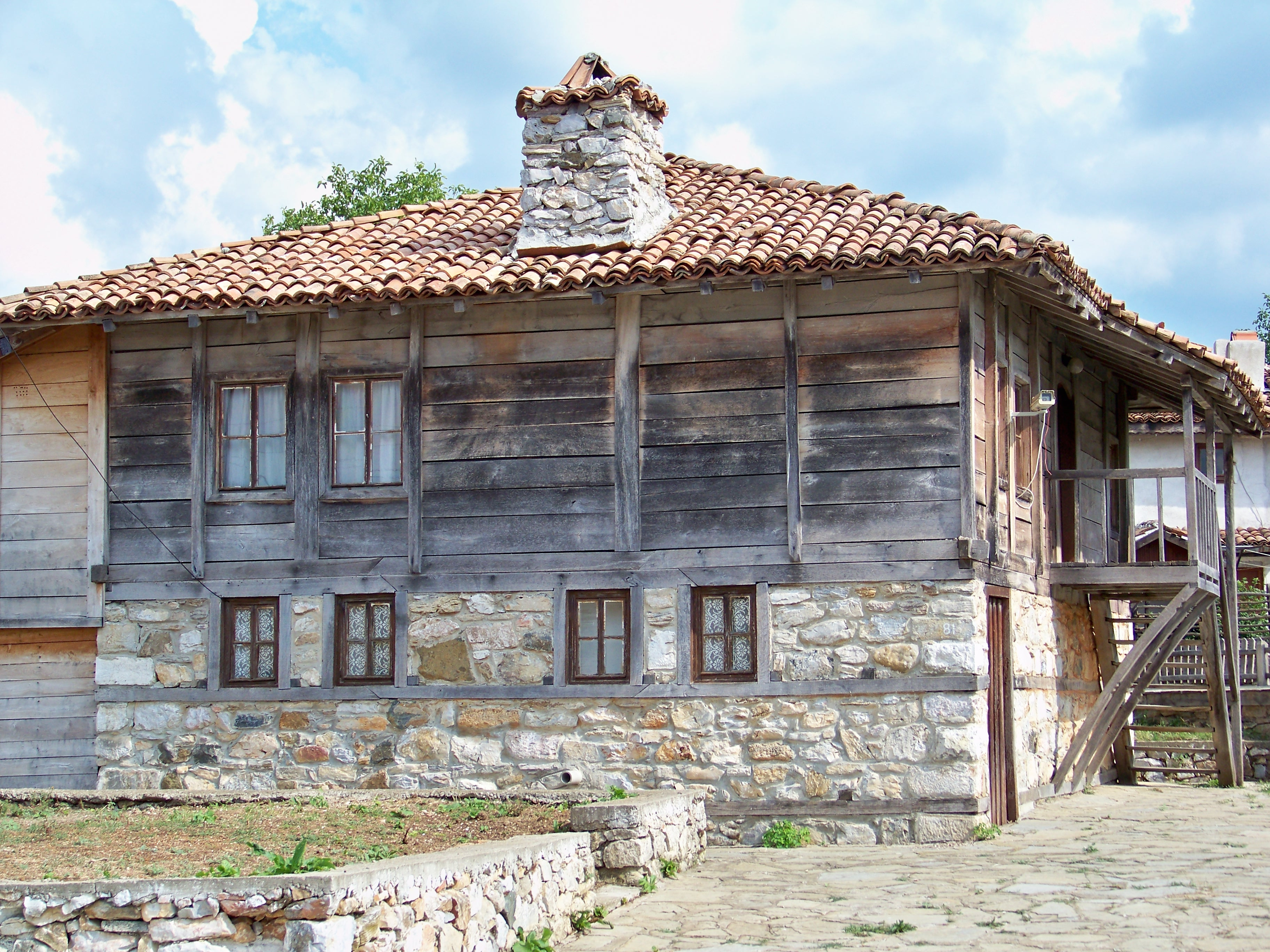
Typical wooden architecture of inland Bulgarian Strandzha

Strandzha (Bulgarian: Странджа, also transliterated as Strandja, pronounced [ˈstrand͡ʒɐ]; Turkish: Istranca [ɯstɾand͡ʒa], or Yıldız [jɯɫdɯz]) is a mountain massif in southeastern Bulgaria and East Thrace, the European part of Turkey. It is in the southeastern part of the Balkans between the plains of Thrace to the west, the lowlands near Burgas to the north, and the Black Sea to the east. Its highest peak is Mahya Dağı (Bulgarian: Махиада, Mahiada) (1,031 m or 3,383 ft) in Turkey, while the highest point on Bulgarian territory is Golyamo Gradishte (Bulgarian: Голямо Градище) (710 m or 2,329 ft). The total area is approximately 10,000 km^{2} (3,861 sq mi).

== Geography and climate ==
Topographic map of Strandzha and Sakar

The climate of the area is considerably influenced by the Black Sea and is predominantly humid continental in the mountains and humid subtropical at the coast. Major rivers in the area are the Veleka (147 km or 91 mi long) and the border river Rezovska (112 km or 70 mi long).

== Strandzha Nature Park ==
Strandzha Nature Park, established in 1995 in the Bulgarian part of the massif, is the largest protected area in Bulgaria. In size it is 1,161 km^{2} (448 sq mi), or about 1% of Bulgaria's total territory. The İğneada Floodplain Forests National Park was established in 2007 at Turkey's Strandzha park.

== History and culture ==
Inhabited by the Thracians in antiquity, Strandzha is an area with a large concentration of ruins of Thracian sanctuaries, sacrificial altars, dolmens, and other archaeological objects.

The mountains were the site of the Bulgarian Preobrazhenie Uprising of 1903 that was crushed by Ottoman troops. The current Bulgarian-Turkish border in the region was established after the Balkan Wars of 1912–1913, when the southeastern part of Strandzha became part of Turkey and the northern part became a part of Bulgaria. After the expulsion of Thracian Bulgarians in 1913, Muslims from Bulgaria were settled in the Turkish part. During the Population exchange between Greece and Turkey, Greeks were expelled to Greece, while Muslims from Greece were settled in the Turkish part of Strandzha mountains. Muslim immigrants to Turkey from former Yugoslavia also settled in the Turkish part of Strandzha Mountains.

Culturally, the Bulgarian part of Strandzha is known for the specific architecture that can be observed in Malko Tarnovo, Brashlyan, and most other villages, the rich folklore and distinctive rituals, such as nestinarstvo (barefoot dancing on live embers), that preserve pagan elements. The Turkish part is well known for its charcoal burning, goat farming and cheesemaking.

== Flora and fauna ==
The Strandzha Mountains have a rich and diverse flora and fauna, unique within Europe. The eastern part of Strandzha is covered by the most northwestern extent of the Euxine–Colchic deciduous forests ecoregion. 50% of Bulgaria's flora can be observed in Strandzha Nature Park and the area has 121 habitat types. In Strandzha over 600 species of invertebrates are found, as well as over 400 species of vertebrates, 41 species of freshwater fish, 10 species of amphibians, over 20 species of reptile, more than 130 species of breeding birds, and over 60 species of mammals.

One of the reasons for the abundance of flora and fauna is the area's location at a bio-geographical crossroad between the European and Asian continents.

The plant communities in Strandzha developed before Europe was separated from Asia by the formation of the Bosporus Strait that now connects the Black Sea with the Mediterranean Sea. Land-ice never reached Strandzha during the ice-ages of the Pleistocene and the Holocene. This lack of glaciations helped create the circumstances in which flora characteristic for the Tertiary period on the European continent has been preserved in Strandzha.

== Honour ==
Strandzha Glacier on Livingston Island in the South Shetland Islands, Antarctica is named after Strandzha Mountain.
