= List of populated places in Kırklareli Province =

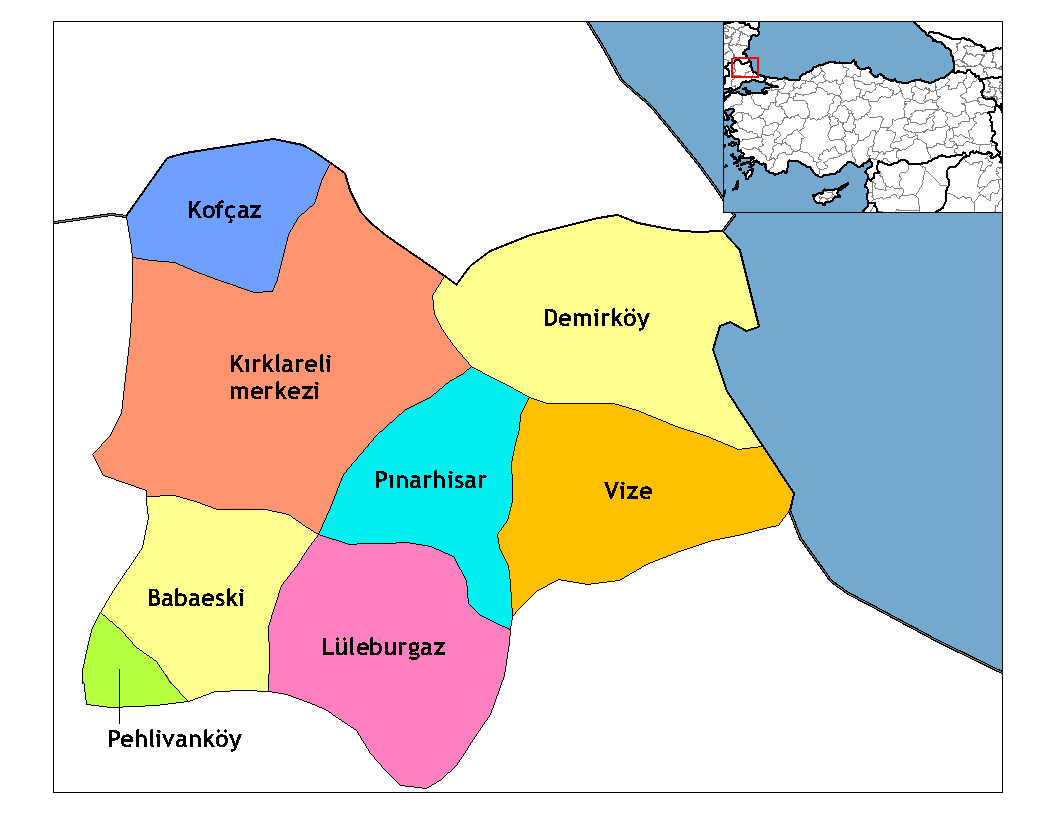
Kırklareli Province

Below is the list of populated places in Kırklareli Province, Turkey by the districts. In the following lists first place in each list is the administrative center of the district.

== Kırklareli ==
- Kırklareli
- Ahmetçe, Kırklareli
- Armağan, Kırklareli
- Asılbeyli, Kırklareli
- Azizbaba, Kırklareli
- Bayramdere, Kırklareli
- Beypınar, Kırklareli
- Çağalayık, Kırklareli
- Çayırlı, Kırklareli
- Çeşmeköy, Kırklareli
- Çukurpınar, Kırklareli
- Değirmencik, Kırklareli
- Demircihalil, Kırklareli
- Dereköy Bucak, Kırklareli
- Deveçatağı, Kırklareli
- Dokuzhüyük, Kırklareli
- Dolhan, Kırklareli
- Düzorman, Kırklareli
- Erikler, Kırklareli
- Eriklice, Kırklareli
- Geçitağzı, Kırklareli
- İnece, Kırklareli
- Kadıköy, Kırklareli
- Kapaklı, Kırklareli
- Karadere, Kırklareli
- Karahamza, Kırklareli
- Karakoç, Kırklareli
- Karıncak, Kırklareli
- Kavakdere, Kırklareli
- Kavaklı, Kırklareli
- Kayalı, Kırklareli
- Kızılcıkdere, Kırklareli
- Kocahıdır, Kırklareli
- Koruköy, Kırklareli
- Koyunbaba, Kırklareli
- Kuzulu, Kırklareli
- Paşayeri, Kırklareli
- Şükrüpaşa, Kırklareli
- Ürünlü, Kırklareli
- Üsküp, Kırklareli
- Üsküpdere, Kırklareli
- Yoğuntaş, Kırklareli
- Yündalan, Kırklareli
- Yürükbayırı, Kırklareli

== Babaeski ==
- Babaeski
- Ağayeri, Babaeski
- Alpullu, Babaeski
- Büyükmandıra, Babaeski
- Çavuşköy, Babaeski
- Çengerli, Babaeski
- Çiğdemli, Babaeski
- Düğüncülü, Babaeski
- Erikleryurdu, Babaeski
- Ertuğrulköy, Babaeski
- Kadıköy, Babaeski
- Karabayır, Babaeski
- Karacaoğlan, Babaeski
- Karahalil, Babaeski
- Karamesutlu, Babaeski
- Katranca, Babaeski
- Kuleli, Babaeski
- Kumrular, Babaeski
- Kuzuçardağı, Babaeski
- Minnetler, Babaeski
- Mutlu, Babaeski
- Müsellim, Babaeski
- Nacak, Babaeski
- Nadırlı, Babaeski
- Oruçlu, Babaeski
- Osmaniye, Babaeski
- Pancarköy, Babaeski
- Sinanlı, Babaeski
- Sofuhalil, Babaeski
- Taşağıl, Babaeski
- Taşköprü, Babaeski
- Terzili, Babaeski
- Yeniköy, Babaeski
- Yenimahalle, Babaeski

== Demirköy ==
- Demirköy
- Armutveren, Demirköy
- Avcılar, Demirköy
- Balaban, Demirköy
- Beğendik, Demirköy
- Boztaş, Demirköy
- Gökyaka, Demirköy
- Hamdibey, Demirköy
- İğneada, Demirköy
- İncesırt, Demirköy
- Karacadağ, Demirköy
- Limanköy, Demirköy
- Sarpdere, Demirköy
- Sislioba, Demirköy
- Sivriler, Demirköy
- Yeşilce, Demirköy
- Yiğitbaşı, Demirköy

== Köfçaz ==
- Kofçaz
- Ahlatlı, Kofçaz
- Ahmetler, Kofçaz
- Aşağıkanara, Kofçaz
- Beyci, Kofçaz
- Devletliağaç, Kofçaz
- Elmacık, Kofçaz
- Karaabalar, Kofçaz
- Kocatarla, Kofçaz
- Kocayazı, Kofçaz
- Kula, Kofçaz
- Malkoçlar, Kofçaz
- Tastepe, Kofçaz
- Tatlıpınar, Kofçaz
- Terzidere, Kofçaz
- Topçular, Kofçaz
- Yukarıkanara, Kofçaz

== Lüleburgaz ==
- Lüleburgaz
- Ahmetbey, Lüleburgaz
- Akçaköy, Lüleburgaz
- Alacaoğlu, Lüleburgaz
- Ayvalı, Lüleburgaz
- Büyükkarıştıran, Lüleburgaz
- Celaliye, Lüleburgaz
- Ceylanköy, Lüleburgaz
- Çengelli, Lüleburgaz
- Çeşmekolu, Lüleburgaz
- Çiftlikköy, Lüleburgaz
- Davutlu, Lüleburgaz
- Düğüncübaşı, Lüleburgaz
- Emirali, Lüleburgaz
- Ertuğrul, Lüleburgaz
- Eskibedir, Lüleburgaz
- Eskitaşlı, Lüleburgaz
- Evrensekiz, Lüleburgaz
- Hamitabat, Lüleburgaz
- Hamzabey, Lüleburgaz
- Karaağaç, Lüleburgaz
- Karamusul, Lüleburgaz
- Kayabeyli, Lüleburgaz
- Kırıkköy, Lüleburgaz
- Müsellim, Lüleburgaz
- Oklalı, Lüleburgaz
- Ovacık, Lüleburgaz
- Sakızköy, Lüleburgaz
- Sarıcaali, Lüleburgaz
- Seyitler, Lüleburgaz
- Tatarköy, Lüleburgaz
- Turgutbey, Lüleburgaz
- Umurca, Lüleburgaz
- Yenibedir, Lüleburgaz
- Yenitaşlı, Lüleburgaz

== Pehlivanköy ==
- Pehlivanköy
- Akarca, Pehlivanköy
- Doğanca, Pehlivanköy
- Hıdırca, Pehlivanköy
- İmampazarı, Pehlivanköy
- Kumköy, Pehlivanköy
- Kuştepe, Pehlivanköy
- Yeşilova, Pehlivanköy
- Yeşilpınar, Pehlivanköy

== Pınarhisar ==
- Pınarhisar
- Akören, Pınarhisar
- Ataköy, Pınarhisar
- Cevizköy, Pınarhisar
- Çayırdere, Pınarhisar
- Erenler, Pınarhisar
- Evciler, Pınarhisar
- Hacıfakılı, Pınarhisar
- İslambeyli, Pınarhisar
- Kaynarca, Pınarhisar
- Kurudere, Pınarhisar
- Osmancık, Pınarhisar
- Poyralı, Pınarhisar
- Sütlüce, Pınarhisar
- Tozaklı, Pınarhisar
- Yenice, Pınarhisar

== Vize ==
- Vize
- Akıncılar
- Akpınar
- Aksicim
- Balkaya
- Çakıllı
- Çavuşköy
- Çüvenli
- Develi
- Doğanca
- Düzova
- Evrenli
- Hamidiye
- Hasbuğa
- Kışlacık
- Kıyıköy
- Kızılağaç
- Kömürköy
- Küçükyayla
- Müsellim
- Okçular
- Pazarlı
- Topçuköy
