= List of municipalities in Kırklareli Province =

This is the List of municipalities in Kırklareli Province, Turkey as of March 2023.

District	Municipality
Babaeski	Alpullu
Babaeski	Babaeski
Babaeski	Büyükmandıra
Babaeski	Karahalil
Demirköy	Demirköy
Demirköy	İğneada
Kırklareli	İnece
Kırklareli	Kavaklı
Kırklareli	Kırklareli
Kırklareli	Üsküp
Kofçaz	Kofçaz
Lüleburgaz	Ahmetbey
Lüleburgaz	Büyükkarıştıran
Lüleburgaz	Evrensekiz
Lüleburgaz	Lüleburgaz
Pehlivanköy	Pehlivanköy
Pınarhisar	Kaynarca
Pınarhisar	Pınarhisar
Vize	Çakıllı
Vize	Kıyıköy
Vize	Vize
