= List of extreme points of Turkey =

The geographically extreme points of the Republic of Turkey are:

- Northernmost: The point is on the Turkish-Bulgarian border in Kofçaz, Kırklareli Province – (42°06′21″N 27°14′27″E)
- Southernmost: The spring of Kale Stream, Yayladağı, Hatay Province – (35°48′46″N 36°09′08″E)
- Westernmost: Cape Avlaka, Gökçeada(İmbros Island), Çanakkale – (40°07′30″N 25°39′56″E)
- Easternmost: Dilucu Bordergate, Aralık/Iğdır – (39°39′03″N 44°49′04″E)
- Center (according to the rectangle made by the parallels and meridians that pass through the most eastern, western, northern and southern points): Point near Yukarıhasinli Village and Karakimse Village, Kocasinan, Kayseri – (38°57′32″N 35°11′12″E)

Note: The westernmost point connected to land is Cape Baba/Ayvacık/Çanakkale. Cape Baba is also the westernmost point of the Asian mainland. The southernmost point of Anatolia is Cape Anamur, Anamur, Mersin.

== City Centers ==
- Northernmost: Sinop
- Southernmost: Antakya
- Westernmost: Çanakkale
- Easternmost: Iğdır

== Towns (>2000) ==
- Northernmost: Sinop (for "not a city", it's Doğanyurt/Kastamonu)
- Southernmost: Yayladağı/Hatay Province
- Westernmost: Gökçeada (İmroz)/Çanakkale
- Easternmost: Aralık/Iğdır

== Villages ==
- Northernmost: Ahlatlı/Kofçaz/Kırklareli
- Southernmost: Aşağıpulluyazı/Yayladağı/Hatay Province
- Westernmost: Uğurlu/Gökçeada (İmroz)/Çanakkale
- Easternmost: Alan/Şemdinli/Hakkari

== Altitude ==
- Highest: Mount Ararat (Ağrı), Iğdır — 5,165 metres (16,946 ft)

== See also ==
- Extreme points of Earth
- Geography of Turkey
