= Emirali, Lüleburgaz =

Emirali
- Village
- Location within Turkey Location within Marmara
- Country: Turkey
- Province: Kırklareli
- District: Lüleburgaz
- Population (2022): 618
- Time zone: UTC+3 (TRT)

Emirali is a village in Lüleburgaz District of Kırklareli Province, Turkey. Its population is 618 (2022).

The history of Emirali is shrouded in mystery, but it is known that in 1877–1878, during the Ottoman-Russian War, immigrants came to the area from Romania, Bulgaria, and Greece to the area of Thrace. Before the village was formally established, the area saw a great deal of conflict related to the war. Ethnic Albanian and Gagauz people are recorded as having defended the town.

Farming and agriculture are the main industries in Emirali. Some work in the fabric industry in nearby cities. Traditional Thracian culture continues in Emirali. The village has a primary school, a water system, and hosts a local soccer team. Twice a day there is bus service to Istanbul.

The village is northeast of Lüleburgaz, and covers an area of about 20,000 hectares (49,000 acres). Kırklareli is 78 kilometres (48 mi) distant; Lüleburgaz, 17 km (11 mi), Ahmetbey 3 km (1.9 mi), and Sakızköy 7 km (4.3 mi).

In winter, the climate is cold and rainy. Summers are generally hot.

== Population ==
Historical population
Year	Pop.	±% p.a.
1997	1,063	—
2007	920	−1.43%
2012	850	−1.57%
2017	730	−3.00%
2022	618	−3.28%
Source: 1997 census and TÜIK (2007-2022)
