= Karamesutlu, Babaeski =

Karamesutlu
- Village
- Location within Turkey Location within Marmara
- Coordinates: 41°29′N 27°06′E
- Country: Turkey
- Province: Kırklareli
- District: Babaeski
- Population (2022): 345
- Time zone: UTC+3 (TRT)

Karamesutlu is a village in the Babaeski District in the Kırklareli Province in Thracian Turkey. Its population is 345 (2022). It lies on the highway that connects Babaeski to Kırklareli and further extends to Dereköy, the border crossing with Bulgaria. It is 7 km from Babaeski and 30 km from Kırklareli. It is also 2 km from the ramp of the Trans-European Motorway, which goes from Ankara (in central Turkey) to Europe.

It lies on a flat landscape where the highest elevation does not exceed 100 m. Agricultural farming is the primary source of income. Sunflower and wheat are the main crops. Cattle is also raised. The Şeytan ("devil" in Turkish) Stream flows through the land of the village and provides an important source for irrigation.
