= Mutlu, Babaeski =

Mutlu
- Village
- Location within Turkey Location within Marmara
- Country: Turkey
- Province: Kırklareli
- District: Babaeski
- Population (2022): 354
- Time zone: UTC+3 (TRT)

Mutlu is a village in Babaeski District of Kırklareli Province, Turkey. Its population is 354 (2022). The distance to Babaeski is 13 kilometres (8.1 mi).
