= Kofçaz District =

District of Kırklareli Province, Turkey

- District
- Map showing Kofçaz District in Kırklareli Province

- Location in Turkey Kofçaz District (Marmara)
- Coordinates: 41°56′N 27°10′E
- Country: Turkey
- Province: Kırklareli
- Seat: Kofçaz

Government
  - Kaymakam: Onur Bektaş
- Area: 545 km^{2} (210 sq mi)
- Population (2022): 2,125
  - Density: 3.9/km^{2} (10/sq mi)
- Time zone: UTC+3 (TRT)
- Website: www.kofcaz.gov.tr

Kofçaz District is a district of the Kırklareli Province of Turkey. Its seat is the town of Kofçaz. Its area is 545 km^{2}, and its population is 2,125 (2022).

Kofçaz District borders Bulgaria. It is situated in a mountainous area in the outskirts of Yıldız (Istranca) mountains at an elevation of 640 m and has one of the lowest population densities in all of Turkey. The population of the district consists of the local Turkish population who call themselves Gacal and the Turkish communities who came after the Balkan defeat. The climate is typical continental with cold, snowy winters and hot, dry summers. There is no industry. Forestry, agriculture, and cattle raising are the major ways of living.

== Composition ==
There is one municipality in Kofçaz District:

- Kofçaz

There are 15 villages in Kofçaz District:

- Ahlatlı
- Ahmetler
- Aşağıkanara
- Beyci
- Devletliağaç
- Elmacık
- Karaabalar
- Kocatarla
- Kocayazı
- Malkoçlar
- Tastepe
- Tatlıpınar
- Terzidere
- Topçular
- Yukarıkanara
