= Lüleburgaz District =

District of Kırklareli Province, Turkey

- District
- Map showing Lüleburgaz District in Kırklareli Province

- Location in Turkey Lüleburgaz District (Marmara)
- Coordinates: 41°24′N 27°21′E
- Country: Turkey
- Province: Kırklareli
- Seat: Lüleburgaz

Government
  - Kaymakam: Salih Yüce
- Area: 1,016 km^{2} (392 sq mi)
- Population (2022): 153,903
  - Density: 150/km^{2} (390/sq mi)
- Time zone: UTC+3 (TRT)
- Website: www.luleburgaz.gov.tr

Lüleburgaz District is a district of the Kırklareli Province of Turkey. Its seat is the city of Lüleburgaz. Its area is 1,016 km^{2}, and its population is 153,903 (2022).

== Composition ==
There are four municipalities in Lüleburgaz District:

- Ahmetbey
- Büyükkarıştıran
- Evrensekiz
- Lüleburgaz

There are 31 villages in Lüleburgaz District:

- Akçaköy
- Alacaoğlu
- Ayvalı
- Celaliye
- Çengelli
- Çeşmekolu
- Ceylanköy
- Çiftlikköy
- Davutlu
- Düğüncübaşı
- Emirali
- Ertuğrul
- Eskibedir
- Eskitaşlı
- Hamitabat
- Hamzabey
- Karaağaç
- Karamusul
- Kayabeyli
- Kırıkköy
- Müsellim
- Oklalı
- Ovacık
- Sakızköy
- Sarıcaali
- Seyitler
- Tatarköy
- Turgutbey
- Umurca
- Yenibedir
- Yenitaşlı
