= Davutlu, Lüleburgaz =

Village in Lüleburgaz, Turkey

Davutlu
- Village
- Location in Turkey Davutlu (Marmara)
- Coordinates: 41°14′N 27°25′E
- Country: Turkey
- Province: Kırklareli
- District: Lüleburgaz
- Population (2023): 100
- Time zone: UTC+3 (TRT)

Davutlu is a village in Turkey, in the Lüleburgaz District in Kırklareli Province. Its population is 100 (2023). The village has had the same name since 1928.

== Geography ==
The village is 93 km from the center of Kırklareli, 33 km from the center of Lüleburgaz. The village is to the south of Lüleburgaz, on the border of Tekirdağ Province.

== Population ==
Historical population
Year	Pop.	±% p.a.
1965	311	—
1985	193	−2.36%
1990	168	−2.74%
1997	132	−3.39%
2007	164	+2.19%
2012	157	−0.87%
2017	123	−4.76%
2023	100	−3.39%
Source: Population censuses (1965-1997) and TÜİK (2007-2023)
