= Kurudere, Pınarhisar =

Kurudere
- Village
- Location within Turkey Location within Marmara
- Coordinates: 41°45′N 27°33′E
- Country: Turkey
- Province: Kırklareli
- District: Pınarhisar
- Elevation: 485 m (1,591 ft)
- Population (2022): 305
- Time zone: UTC+3 (TRT)
- Postal code: 39300
- Area code: 0288

Kurudere is a village in Pınarhisar District of Kırklareli Province, Turkey. Its population is 305 (2022). It is situated in the eastern Trakya (Thrace) plains. The distance to Pınarhisar is 20 kilometres (12 mi). In the 19th century most of the population was composed of ethnic Bulgarians. But after the Second Balkan War the Bulgarian population was forced to leave the settlement.
