= Alpullu =

- Municipality
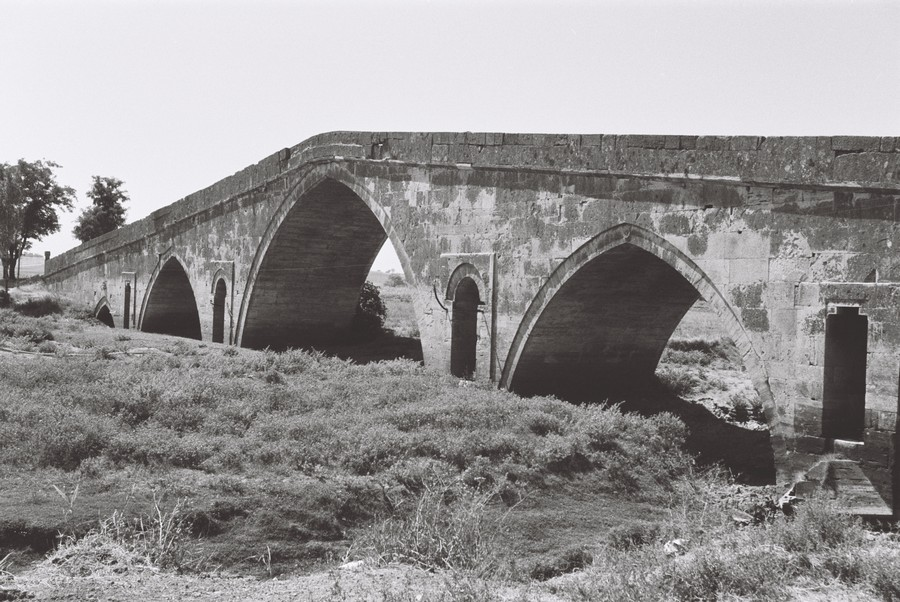
- Alpullu Bridge (Ottoman bridge over the Ergene River)

- Location within Turkey Location within Marmara
- Coordinates: 41°22′N 27°09′E
- Country: Turkey
- Province: Kırklareli
- District: Babaeski
- Elevation: 40 m (130 ft)
- Population (2022): 2,070
- Time zone: UTC+3 (TRT)
- Postal code: 39570
- Area code: 0288

Alpullu is a town (belde) in the Babaeski District, Kırklareli Province, Turkey. Its population is 2,070 (2022).

== Geography ==
The distance from Alpullu to Babaeski is 10 kilometres (6.2 mi) and the distance to Kırklareli is 45 kilometres (28 mi). Alpullu is at the junction of the main railroad connecting Istanbul to Edirne and the tail line to Kırklareli.

== History ==
The ancient name of the town was probably Alpiya meaning "Shining Water country". But during the Turkish era the name was Şekerköy meaning "Sugar village" referring to the importance of sugar beet to the town's economy. There is an ancient tumulus near the town and an Ottoman bridge named Sinanlı Mehmet köprüsü around the town. The Greek population called the town Alepli (Greek: Αλεπλή).

During the First Balkan War the retreating Turkish army burnt 250 houses of the Greek population and murdered 109 Greek inhabitants of both sexes and of all ages. Also, the Turks burned the food of the inhabitants and stole fifty pairs of oxen, with carts and 2,000 sheep. Under Bulgarian rule the villagers reconstructed their buildings. When Turks recaptured the town new persecutions broke out, some Greeks murdered by the Turks and the inhabitants were expelled and fled to Greece.

But during the Russo-Turkish War (1877-1878) Muslim people from Bulgaria, the Pomaks who escaped from the Russian armies were settled in the farm to form the core of the town.

Alpullu was declared a seat of township in 1964.

== Economy ==
Alpullu's economy depends on sugar beet, and the first sugar refinery of Turkey was founded in Alpullu in 1925 as one of the earliest industrial projects of the newly founded Turkish Republic. Now Alpullu is one of the most flourishing towns of Turkey. In 2007 a natural gas source was found in Alpullu
