= Karamusul, Lüleburgaz =

Karamusul
- Village
- Location within Turkey Location within Marmara
- Coordinates: 41°18′N 27°27′E
- Country: Turkey
- Province: Kırklareli
- District: Lüleburgaz
- Population (2022): 429
- Time zone: UTC+3 (TRT)

Karamusul is a village in Lüleburgaz District of Kırklareli Province, Turkey and lies on the Ergene River. Its population is 429 (2022).
