= Burtudizon =

Town of ancient Thrace

Coordinates: 41°25′41″N 27°05′33″E

Burtudizon was a town of ancient Thrace, inhabited during Roman and Byzantine times.

Its site is located near Babaeski in European Turkey.
