= Pınarhisar District =

District of Kırklareli Province, Turkey

- District
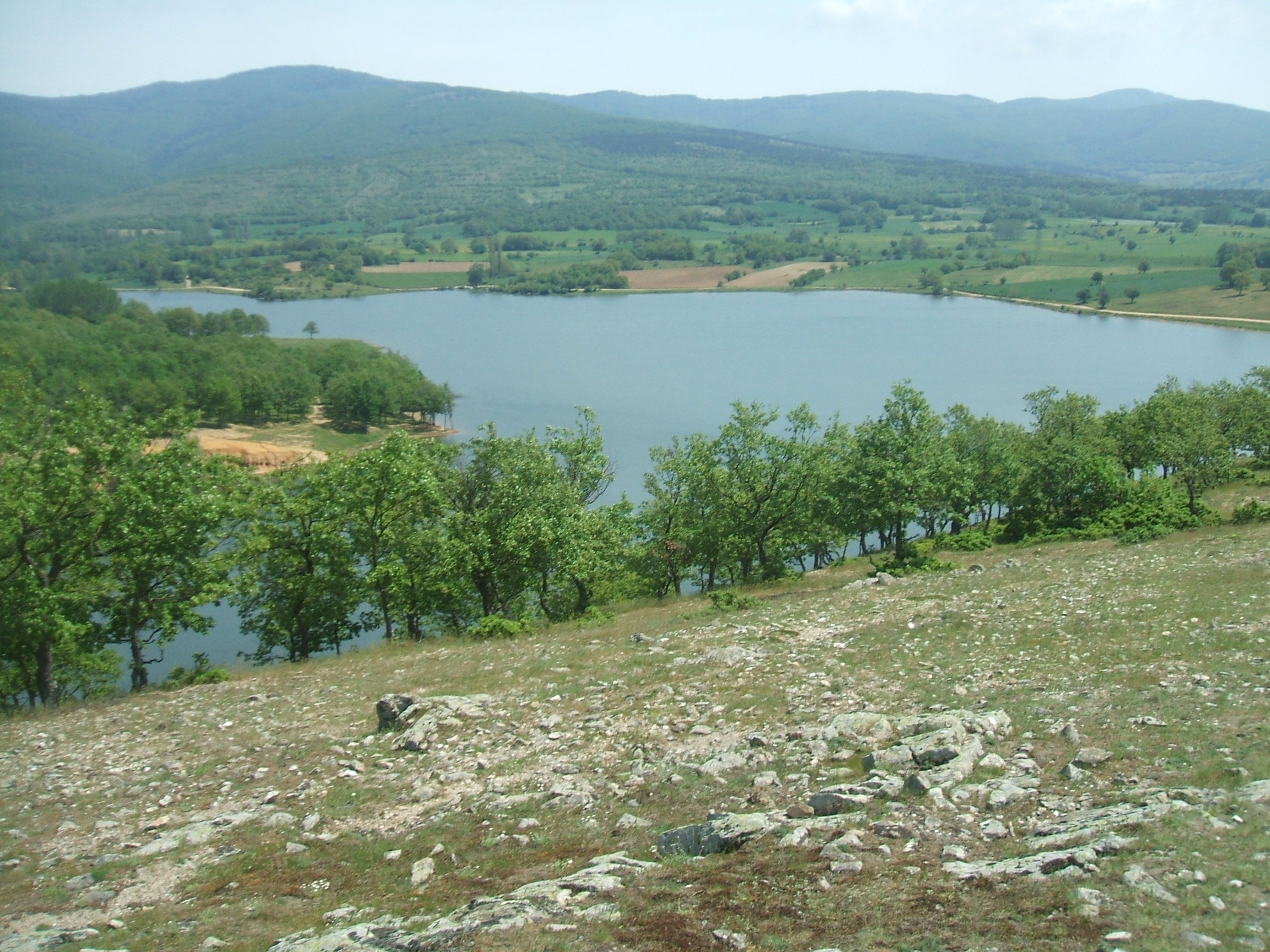
- Evciler Pond, Pınarhisar District

- Map showing Pınarhisar District in Kırklareli Province

- Location within Turkey Location within Marmara
- Coordinates: 41°38′N 27°31′E
- Country: Turkey
- Province: Kırklareli
- Seat: Pınarhisar

Government
  - Kaymakam: Betül Büyükkılıç
- Area: 518 km^{2} (200 sq mi)
- Population (2022): 17,402
  - Density: 33.6/km^{2} (87.0/sq mi)
- Time zone: UTC+3 (TRT)
- Website: www.pinarhisar.gov.tr

Pınarhisar District is a district of the Kırklareli Province of Turkey. Its seat is the town of Pınarhisar. Its area is 518 km^{2}, and its population is 17,402 (2022).

== Composition ==
There are two municipalities in Pınarhisar District:

- Kaynarca
- Pınarhisar

There are 14 villages in Pınarhisar District:

- Akören
- Ataköy
- Çayırdere
- Cevizköy
- Erenler
- Evciler
- Hacıfakılı
- İslambeyli
- Kurudere
- Osmancık
- Poyralı
- Sütlüce
- Tozaklı
- Yenice
