= İslambeyli, Pınarhisar =

İslambeyli Urummbeyli
- Village
- Location within Turkey Location within Marmara
- Coordinates: 41°42′N 27°37′E
- Country: Turkey
- Province: Kırklareli
- District: Pınarhisar
- Elevation: 412 m (1,352 ft)
- Population (2022): 243
- Time zone: UTC+3 (TRT)
- Postal code: 39300
- Area code: 0288

İslambeyli is a village in Pınarhisar District of Kırklareli Province, Turkey. Its population was 243, as of 2022. It is situated in the Eastern Thrace plains. It is located 17 kilometres (11 mi) from Pınarhisar. The village was formerly known as Urumbeyli. It was a Bulgarian village during the Ottoman Empire era. However, after the Second Balkan War, the Bulgarian population was forced to leave the settlement.
