= Ovacık, Lüleburgaz =

Ovacık
- Village
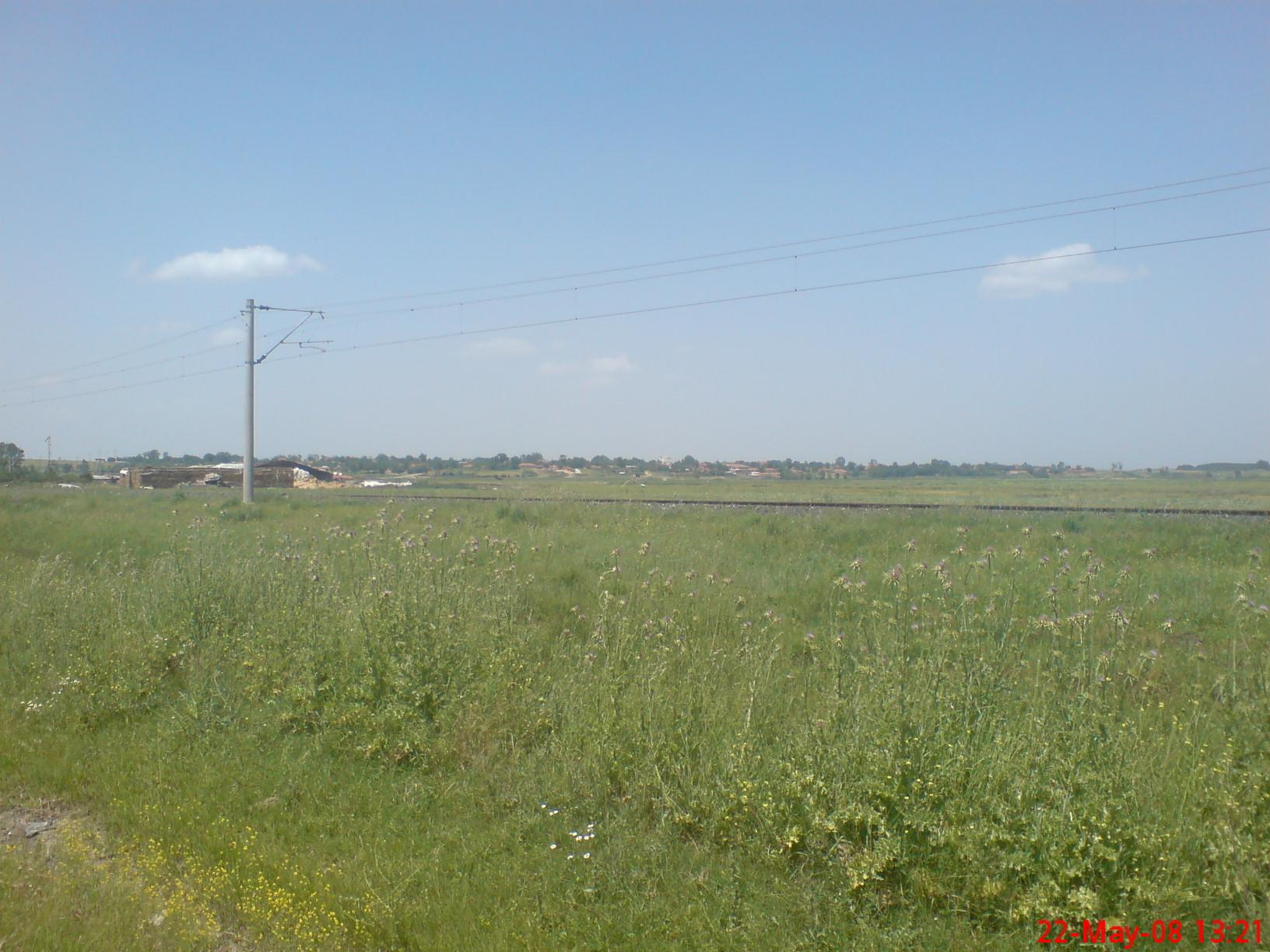

- Location within Turkey Location within Marmara
- Coordinates: 41°19′18″N 27°23′59″E
- Country: Turkey
- Province: Kırklareli
- District: Lüleburgaz

Government
  - Muhtar: Ahmet Tokatlı
- Area: 36 km^{2} (14 sq mi)
- Population (2022): 521
  - Density: 14/km^{2} (37/sq mi)
- Time zone: UTC+3 (TRT)
- Postal code: 39750
- Area code: 0288

Ovacık is a village in Lüleburgaz District of Kırklareli Province, in the Marmara region of Turkey. Its population is 521 (2022).

== Population ==
Historical population
| Year | Pop. | ±% p.a. |
|---|---|---|
| 1997 | 903 | — |
| 2007 | 769 | −1.59% |
| 2012 | 648 | −3.37% |
| 2017 | 566 | −2.67% |
| 2022 | 521 | −1.64% |
Source: 1997 census and TÜIK (2007-2022)
