= Hamzabey, Lüleburgaz =

Hamzabey Kolibite
- Village
- Location within Turkey Location within Marmara
- Coordinates: 41°31′N 27°25′E
- Country: Turkey
- Province: Kırklareli
- District: Lüleburgaz
- Elevation: 133 m (436 ft)
- Population (2022): 317
- Time zone: UTC+3 (TRT)
- Postal code: 39750
- Area code: 0288

Hamzabey is a village in Lüleburgaz District of Kırklareli Province, Turkey. Its population is 317 (2022). The village is located in the eastern part of the Thrace region. The distance to Lüleburgaz is 12 kilometres (7.5 mi). The old name of this village is Koliba. It was a Bulgarian village during the Ottoman Empire era. But after the Second Balkan War the Bulgarian population was forced to leave the settlement.
