= Babaeski District =

District of Kırklareli Province, Turkey

- District
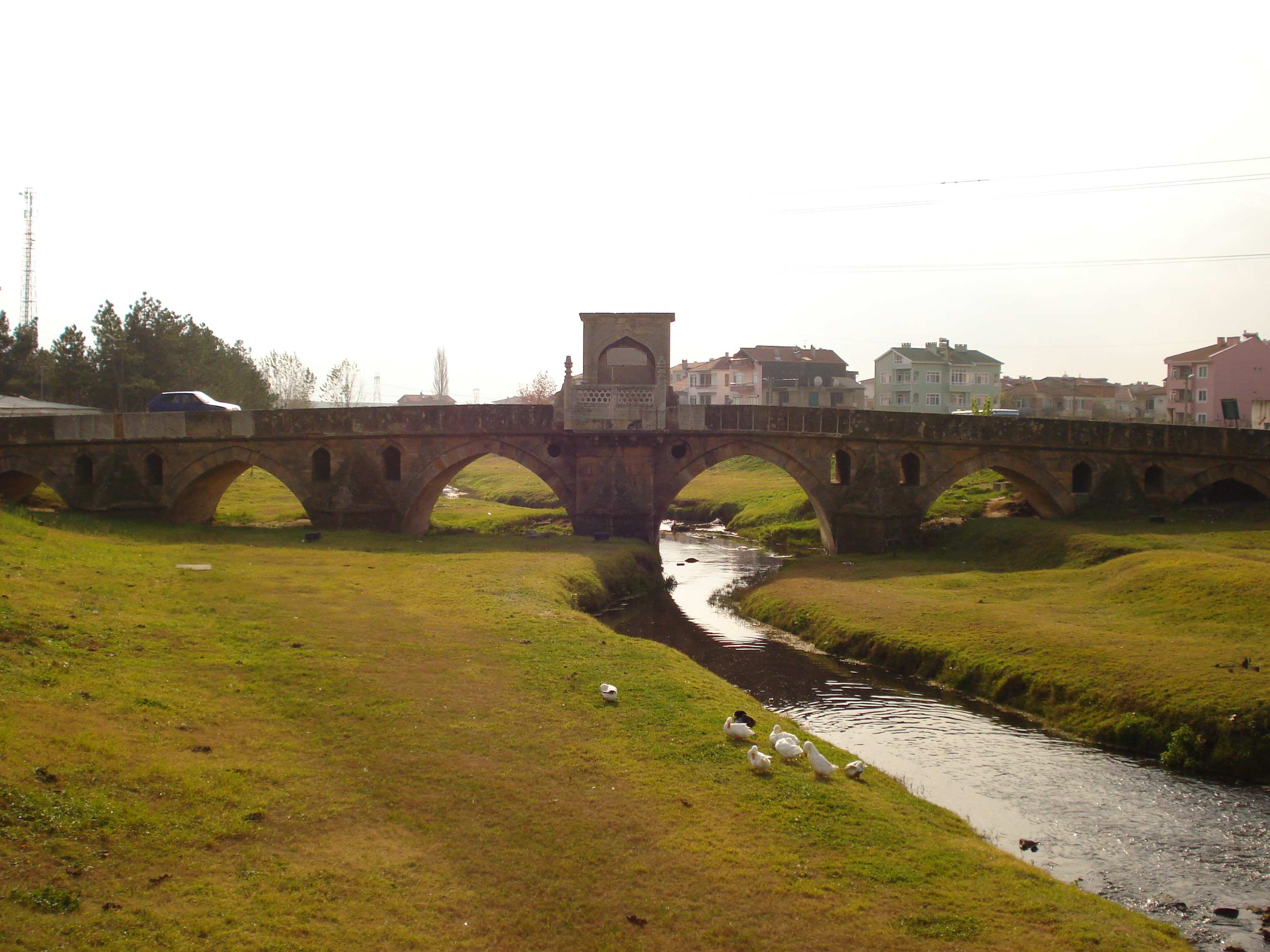
- Babaeski Bridge

- Map showing Babaeski District in Kırklareli Province

- Location within Turkey Location within Marmara
- Coordinates: 41°26′N 27°06′E
- Country: Turkey
- Province: Kırklareli
- Seat: Babaeski

Government
  - Kaymakam: Şenol Levent Elmacıoğlu
- Area: 670 km^{2} (260 sq mi)
- Population (2022): 46,357
  - Density: 69/km^{2} (180/sq mi)
- Time zone: UTC+3 (TRT)
- Website: www.babaeski.gov.tr

Babaeski District is a district of the Kırklareli Province of Turkey. Its seat is the town of Babaeski. Its area is 670 km^{2}, and its population is 46,357 (2022).

== Composition ==
There are four municipalities in Babaeski District:

- Alpullu
- Babaeski
- Büyükmandıra
- Karahalil

There are 31 villages in Babaeski District:

- Ağayeri
- Çavuşköy
- Çengerli
- Çiğdemli
- Düğüncülü
- Erikleryurdu
- Ertuğrulköy
- Hazinedar
- Kadıköy
- Karabayır
- Karacaoğlan
- Karamesutlu
- Katranca
- Kuleli
- Kumrular
- Kuzuçardağı
- Minnetler
- Müsellim
- Mutlu
- Nacak
- Nadırlı
- Oruçlu
- Osmaniye
- Pancarköy
- Sinanlı
- Sofuhalil
- Taşağıl
- Taşköprü
- Terzili
- Yeniköy
- Yenimahalle
