= Hızırbey Mosque Fountain =

Historical drinking fountain in Kırklareli

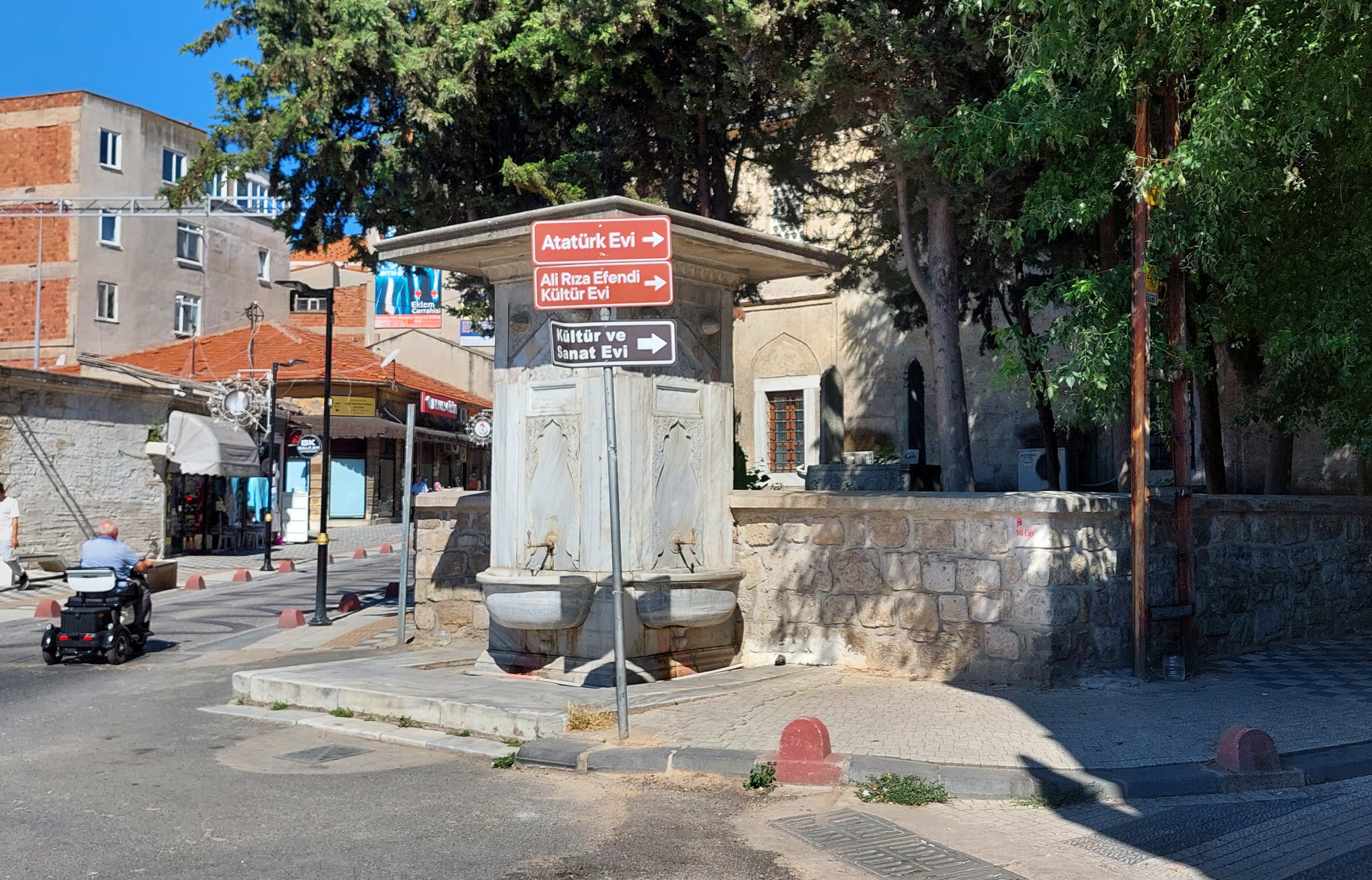
- Hızırbey Mosque Fountain, 2024
- Interactive map of the Hızırbey Mosque Fountain area
- Alternative names: Great Mosque Fountain, German Fountain, Çarşı Fountain

General information
- Location: Kırklareli, Turkey
- Completed: 1913 or 1914

Hızırbey Mosque Fountain, Great Mosque Fountain, German Fountain, or Çarşı Fountain, is a historical fountain located in the central district of Kırklareli, Turkey.

== History ==
Since the inscription of the Hızırbey Mosque Fountain was effaced, there are differing accounts regarding its construction date and its benefactor. While publications on Kırklareli generally state that it was commissioned by Hacı Adil Bey in the late 19th century, Ottoman archival documents demonstrate that this information is inaccurate. Another view suggests that after the destruction of the Serdar Ali Pasha Mosque—referred to locate near “Old Mosque”—during the Balkan Wars, it was not rebuilt due to its proximity to the Hızırbey Mosque, and instead a four-spouted fountain was erected from the Hacı Hasan Ağa wakf. According to the statements of Fitnat Özdil and Melek Özdil, among the last trustees of the Hacı Hasan Ağa Wakf, the fountain belonged to this foundation. It is further recorded that construction began in Hijri 1332 (1913–1914) under the governorship of Kırklareli Sanjak-bey B. Haydar Vaneri, and was later completed by his successor İbrahim Süreyya Yiğit. Subsequently, the fountain was relocated from its original site to the corner of the courtyard wall of the Hızırbey Mosque.

In 2020, within the framework of the project Civilization Brought by Water – Restoration of Historical Fountains (Turkish: Su ile Gelen Medeniyet - Tarihi Çeşmelerin Restorasyonu Projesi), the fountain was not restored along with nine other fountains in the central district of Kırklareli. It was stated that the fountain would first be returned to its original location through a new square arrangement, after which its restoration would be carried out.

== Architecture ==
The fountain has a square plan, four façades, and pointed arches, and was constructed of marble. The pointed arches, built of red and white marble, contain rectangular panels (aynalık) within them. The inscription above the fountain’s mirror stone (aynalık) is defaced and illegible. At the center of the spandrels of the pointed arches are decorative bosses. These architectural features are repeated on all façades; however, since the northern side adjoins the courtyard wall of the Hızırbey Mosque, the trough and faucet elements on that façade were removed. According to information obtained from early photographs of the structure, the original covering of the fountain consisted of a small onion-shaped dome. At present, the fountain is covered with a flat concrete slab.

== See also ==
Geographic data related to Hızırbey Mosque Fountain at OpenStreetMap
