= Pehlivanköy District =

District of Kırklareli Province, Turkey

- District
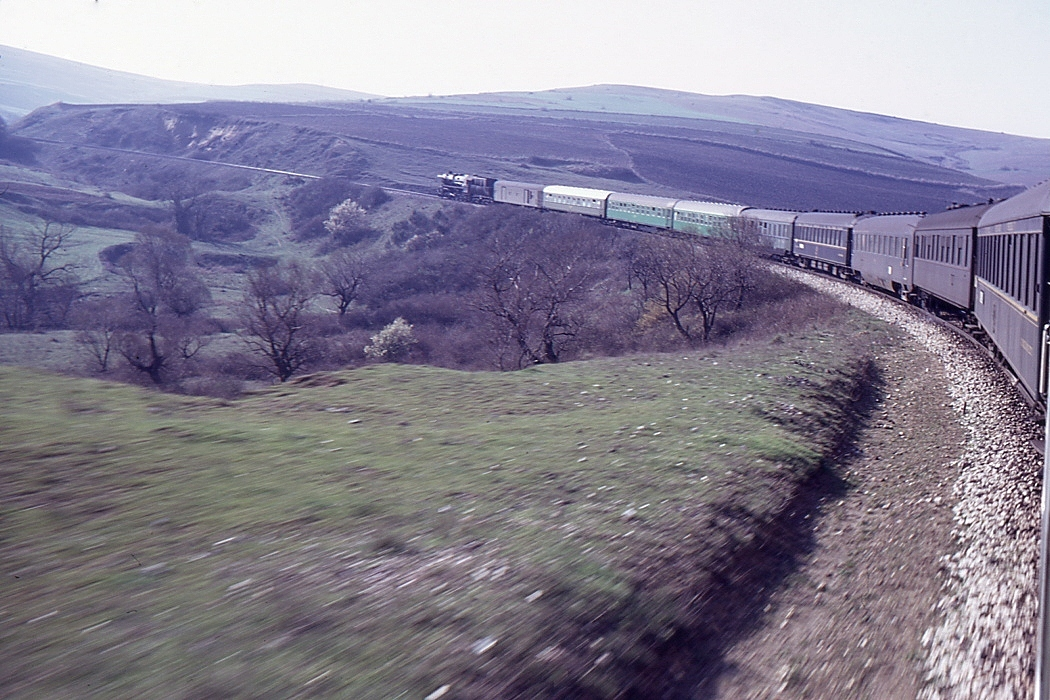
- train between Pehlivanköy and Istanbul

- Map showing Pehlivanköy District in Kırklareli Province

- Location within Turkey Location within Marmara
- Coordinates: 41°21′N 26°55′E
- Country: Turkey
- Province: Kırklareli
- Seat: Pehlivanköy

Government
  - Kaymakam: Erdoğan Beypınar
- Area: 104 km^{2} (40 sq mi)
- Population (2022): 3,380
  - Density: 32.5/km^{2} (84.2/sq mi)
- Time zone: UTC+3 (TRT)
- Website: www.pehlivankoy.gov.tr

Pehlivanköy District is a district of the Kırklareli Province of Turkey. Its seat is the town of Pehlivanköy. Its area is 104 km^{2}, and its population is 3,380 (2022).

== Composition ==
There is one municipality in Pehlivanköy District:

- Pehlivanköy

There are 8 villages in Pehlivanköy District:

- Akarca
- Doğanca
- Hıdırca
- İmampazarı
- Kumköy
- Kuştepe
- Yeşilova
- Yeşilpınar
