= Cevizköy, Pınarhisar =

Cevizköy Çongara
- Village
- Location within Turkey Location within Marmara
- Coordinates: 41°33′N 27°35′E
- Country: Turkey
- Province: Kırklareli
- District: Pınarhisar
- Elevation: 225 m (738 ft)
- Population (2022): 712
- Time zone: UTC+3 (TRT)
- Postal code: 39300
- Area code: 0288

Cevizköy (Greek: Τσόγγαρα) is a village in Pınarhisar District of Kırklareli Province, Turkey. Its population is 712 (2022). It is situated in the eastern Thrace (Trakya) plains. The distance to Pınarhisar is 11 kilometres (6.8 mi). The old name of this village is Çongara. It was a Bulgarian village during the Ottoman Empire era. But after the Second Balkan War the Bulgarian population was forced to leave the settlement.
