= Karahalil =

- Municipality
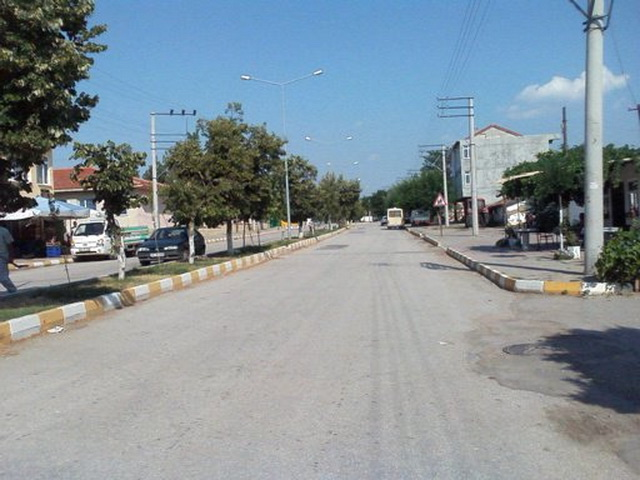
- main road through Karahalil

- Location within Turkey Location within Marmara
- Coordinates: 41°35′58″N 27°02′26″E
- Country: Turkey
- Province: Kırklareli
- District: Babaeski
- Population (2022): 1,298
- Time zone: UTC+3 (TRT)

Karahalil is a town (belde) in the Babaeski District, Kırklareli Province, Turkey. Its population is 1,298 (2022).
