= Büyükkarıştıran =

- Municipality
- Büyükkarıştıran Bridge

- Location within Turkey Location within Marmara
- Coordinates: 41°17′56″N 27°32′40″E
- Country: Turkey
- Province: Kırklareli
- District: Lüleburgaz
- Population (2022): 6,309
- Time zone: UTC+3 (TRT)

Büyükkarıştıran, formerly Drizipara (Greek: Δριζιπάρα), is a town (belde) in the Lüleburgaz District, Kırklareli Province, Turkey. Its population is 6,309 (2022).

== Gallery ==
The ruins of a historical masonry water tower

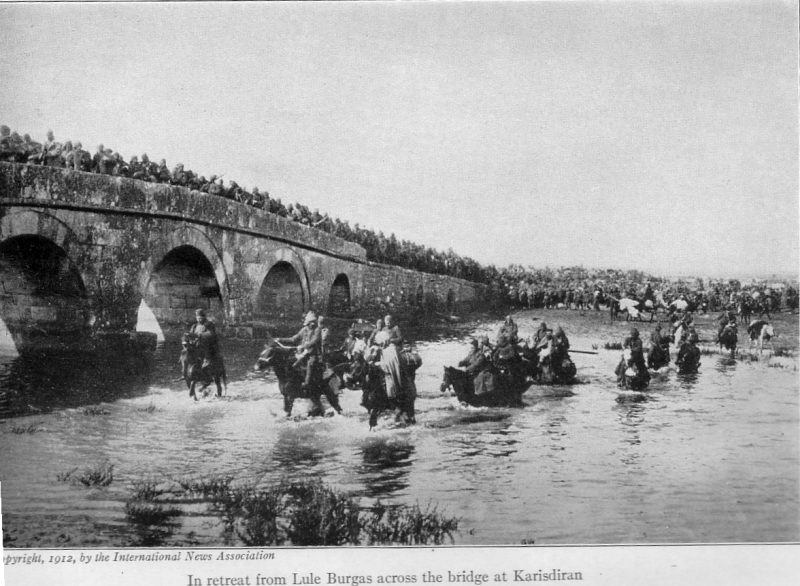
Ottoman troops at Karisdiran (Büyükkarıştıran), 1912
