= Kaynarca, Pınarhisar =

Kaynarca
- Municipality
- Location in Turkey Kaynarca (Marmara)
- Coordinates: 41°39′46″N 27°28′19″E
- Country: Turkey
- Province: Kırklareli
- District: Pınarhisar
- Population (2022): 1,997
- Time zone: UTC+3 (TRT)

Kaynarca is a town (belde) in the Pınarhisar District, Kırklareli Province, Turkey. Its population was 1,997, as of the 2022 census.
