= Büyükmandıra =

- Municipality
- Location in Turkey Büyükmandıra (Marmara)
- Coordinates: 41°21′N 27°06′E
- Country: Turkey
- Province: Kırklareli
- District: Babaeski
- Elevation: 40 m (130 ft)
- Population (2022): 3,305
- Time zone: UTC+3 (TRT)
- Postal code: 39580
- Area code: 0288

Büyükmandıra (or Mandıra for short) is a town (belde) in the Babaeski District, Kırklareli Province, Turkey. Its population is 3,305 (2022). The distance to Babaeski is 10 kilometres (6.2 mi) and the distance to Kırklareli is 50 kilometres (31 mi).

Up to 1877 there was an Ottoman royal farm in place of the town. But during the Russo-Turkish War (1877-1878) Muslim people from Bulgaria Pomaks who escaped from the Russian armies were settled in the farm to form the core of the town. According to the mayor's page, a well known wrestler named Kavasoğlu İbrahim arranged this allocation. The settlement was declared a seat of township in 1955. The name of the town means "great dairy" and it refers to the main activity of town residents.
