= Pınarhisar =

- Municipality
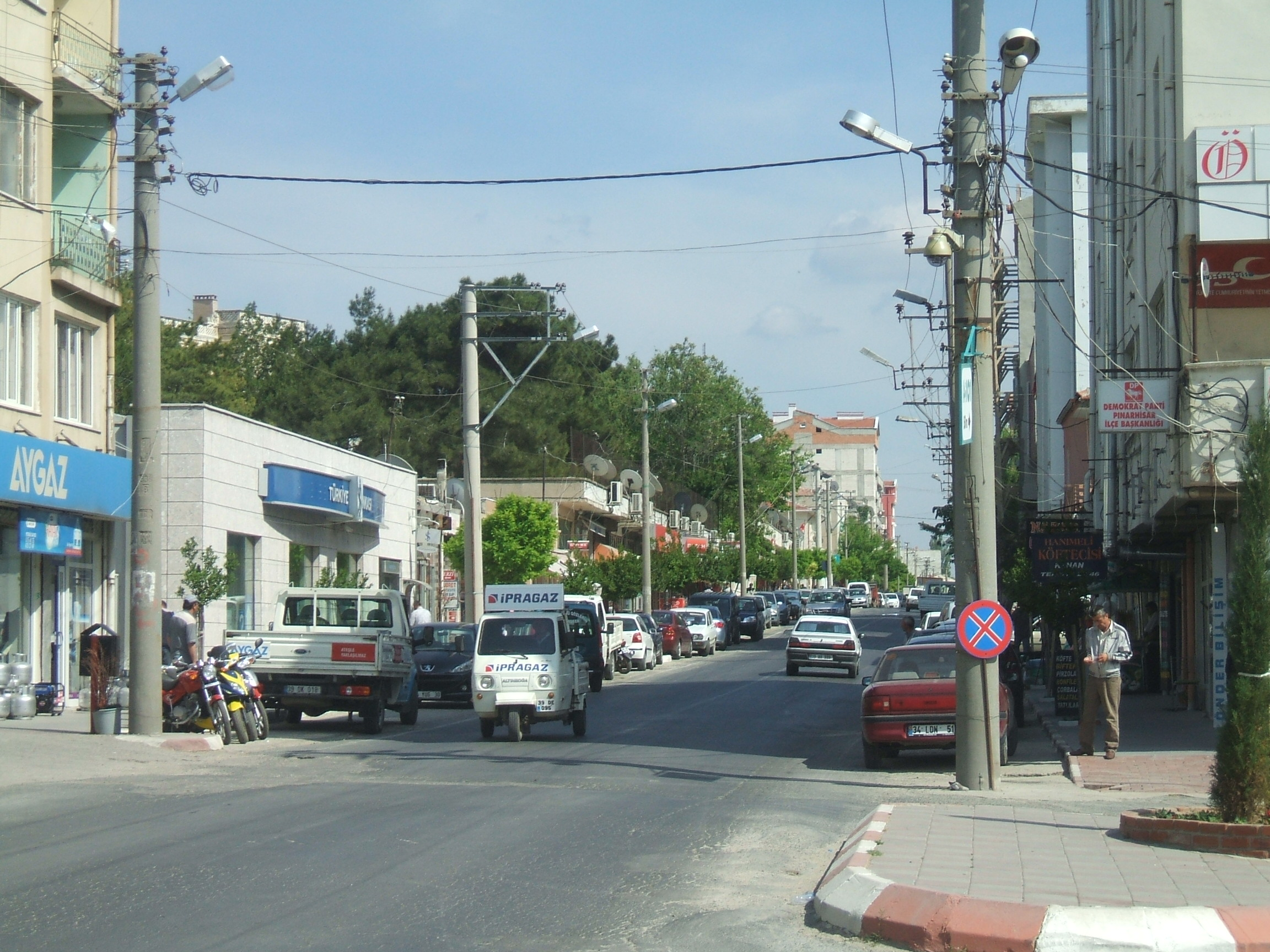

- Location within Turkey Location within Marmara
- Coordinates: 41°37′41″N 27°30′44″E
- Country: Turkey
- Province: Kırklareli
- District: Pınarhisar

Government
  - Mayor: İhsan Talay (AKP)
- Elevation: 189 m (620 ft)
- Population (2022): 10,497
- Time zone: UTC+3 (TRT)
- Postal code: 39300
- Area code: 0288
- Website: www.pinarhisar.bel.tr

Pınarhisar, ancient Bryses or Brysis (Βρύσις in Ancient Greek), is a town in Kırklareli Province in the Marmara region of Turkey. It is the seat of Pınarhisar District. Its population is 10,497 (2022). The mayor is İhsan Talay (AKP).

The town was a part of the defensive line Lüleburgaz - Karaağaç - Bunarhisar during the First Balkan War. The former spelling of its name was Bunarhisar. The settlement was captured by Bulgarians in the First Balkan War but was taken back by the Ottoman Empire in the course of the Second Balkan War.

== History ==
According to Turkish government resources, Pınarhisar was founded during the reign of Theodosius II, by c. 425, under the name "Brysis" meaning "spring" in Greek. The town's fortress was built during the Byzantine era. In 1190, the town was significantly damaged by Crusader occupation. It was attacked by Tatars in 1264.

The town was captured by the Ottomans in 1368, by the forces under the command of Ghazi Mihal, as a part of a campaign led by Murad I.

=== Christian bishopric ===
The first mention of the archdiocese of Brysis is in an early 10th-century Notitia Episcopatuum associated with Emperor Leo VI the Wise. Extant documents record the names of three of its ancient archbishops: John took part in the Second Council of Nicaea in 787; Nicetas was at the Photian Council of Constantinople (879) dell'879; Leo was one of the signatories of a decree of Patriarch Alexius of Constantinople in 1027.

During the Fourth Crusade Brysis became a Latin Church archbishopric under the name Verissa (of Thrace). By 1315 a man named Gerasimos acted as its archbishop, until his death soon after 1331. The metropolitan Matthew of Ephesus exercised his duties following Gerasimos' death, until he left for Ephesus in late 1339.

No longer a residential bishopric, Brysis is today listed by the Catholic Church as a titular see.

== Sources ==
- Soustal, Peter (1991). Tabula Imperii Byzantini, Band 6: Thrakien (Thrakē, Rodopē und Haimimontos) (in German). Vienna: Verlag der Österreichischen Akademie der Wissenschaften. pp. 220–221. ISBN 3-7001-1898-8.
- Treu, M. (1901). Matthaios metropolit von Ephesos: Uebcr sein leben und seine schriften. Potsdam.
