= Sakızköy =

- Village
- Location within Turkey Location within Marmara
- Coordinates: 41°26′N 27°28′E
- Country: Turkey
- Province: Kırklareli
- District: Lüleburgaz
- Elevation: 90 m (300 ft)
- Population (2022): 1,042
- Time zone: UTC+3 (TRT)
- Postal code: 39750
- Area code: 0288

Sakızköy is a village in Lüleburgaz District of Kırklareli Province, Turkey. Its population is 1,042 (2022). Before the 2013 reorganisation, it was a town (belde). It is situated to the east of Turkish motorway O.3. Distance to Lüleburgaz is 10 kilometres (6.2 mi) and to Kırklareli is 66 kilometres (41 mi).

In the early 18th century it was a property of Zeliha Hanım who was the daughter of Merzifonlu Kara Mustafa Pasha a grand vizier of the Ottoman Empire known for his defeat in the Battle of Vienna. Zeliha Hanım sold the property to people from Ivaylovgrad, Bulgaria (then Ortaköy, a part of the Ottoman Empire) and the settlement began to be called Satık köy ("Sold village") In time, the name Satık was replaced with Sakız ("gum"). It's believed to be named Sakız due to its soil being very sticky and gummy. In 1999 it was declared a seat of the township. It was divided into two neighbourhoods; Merkez ( central ) and Hürriyet (Liberty). However, in 2014 in local elections, it was given a village status due to its declining population. The main economic sectors of the town are irrigated agriculture and animal breeding. Cereals, sunflower and sugar beet are among the crops.

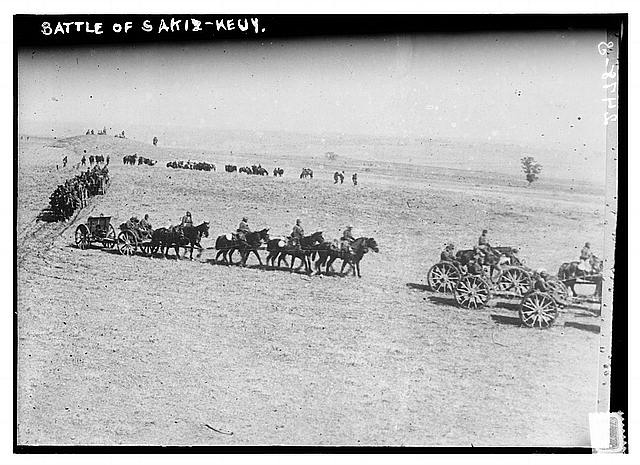
artillery near Sakızköy, during the Battle of Lüleburgaz, 1912
