= Ahmetbey, Lüleburgaz =

Ahmetbey
- Municipality
- Location in Turkey Ahmetbey (Marmara)
- Coordinates: 41°26′25″N 27°35′3″E
- Country: Turkey
- Province: Kırklareli
- District: Lüleburgaz
- Population (2022): 3,628
- Time zone: UTC+3 (TRT)

Ahmetbey is a town (belde) in the Lüleburgaz District, Kırklareli Province, Turkey. Its population is 3,628 (2022).
