= Evrensekiz =

- Municipality
- Location in Turkey Evrensekiz (Marmara)
- Coordinates: 41°22′20″N 27°29′23″E
- Country: Turkey
- Province: Kırklareli
- District: Lüleburgaz
- Population (2022): 2,666
- Time zone: UTC+3 (TRT)

Evrensekiz is a town (belde) in the Lüleburgaz District, Kırklareli Province, Turkey. Its population was 2,666 as of 2022.
