= Pehlivanköy =

- Municipality
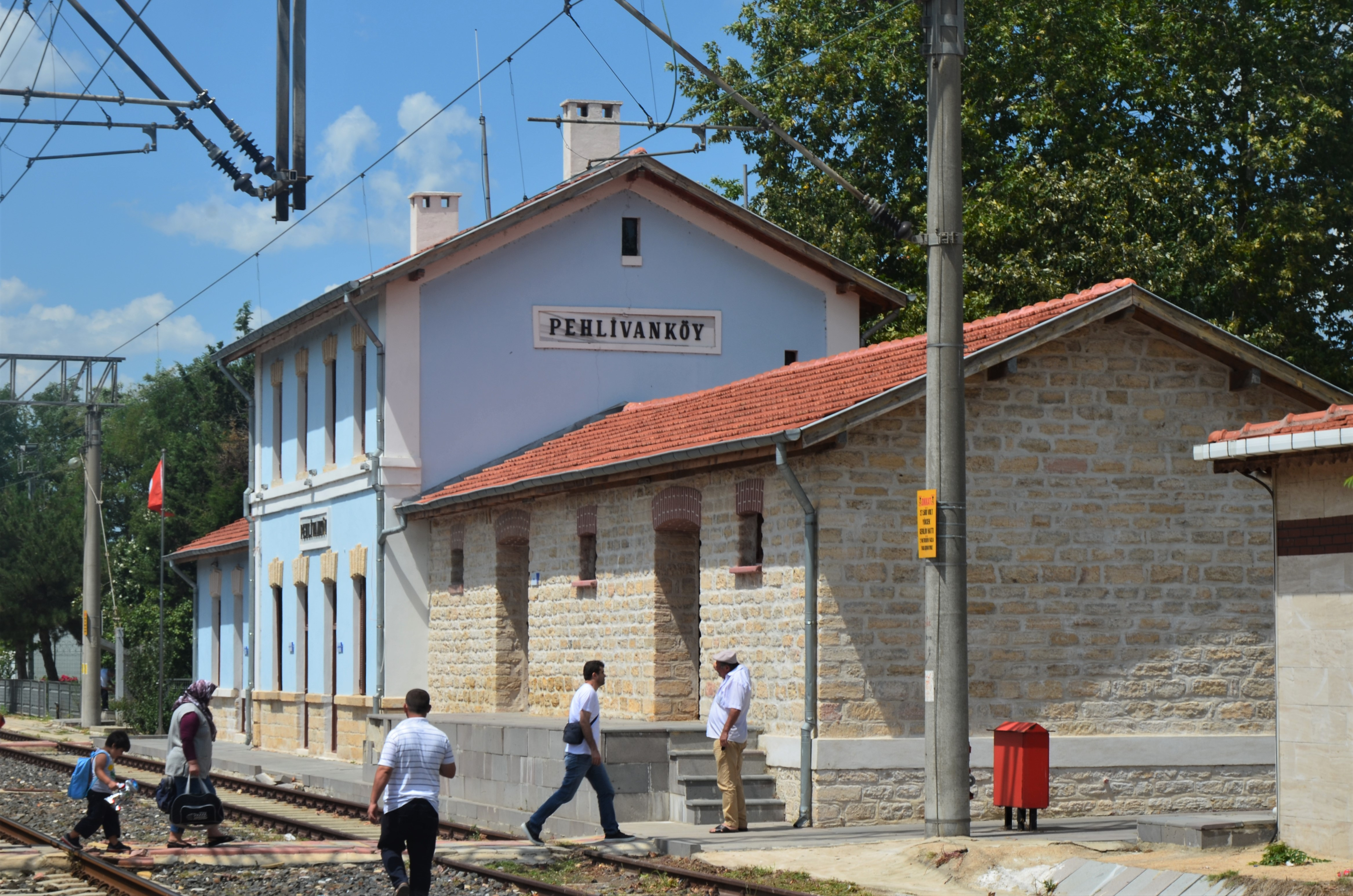
- Pehlivanköy Train Station

- Location within Turkey Location within Marmara
- Coordinates: 41°20′53″N 26°55′11″E
- Country: Turkey
- Province: Kırklareli
- District: Pehlivanköy

Government
  - Mayor: Gündüz Hoşgör (AKP)
- Elevation: 25 m (82 ft)
- Population (2022): 1,654
- Time zone: UTC+3 (TRT)
- Postal code: 39600
- Area code: 0288
- Website: www.pehlivankoy.bel.tr

Pehlivanköy is a town in Kırklareli Province in the Marmara region of Turkey. It is the seat of Pehlivanköy District. Its population is 1,654 (2022).
