= Kofçaz =

- Municipality
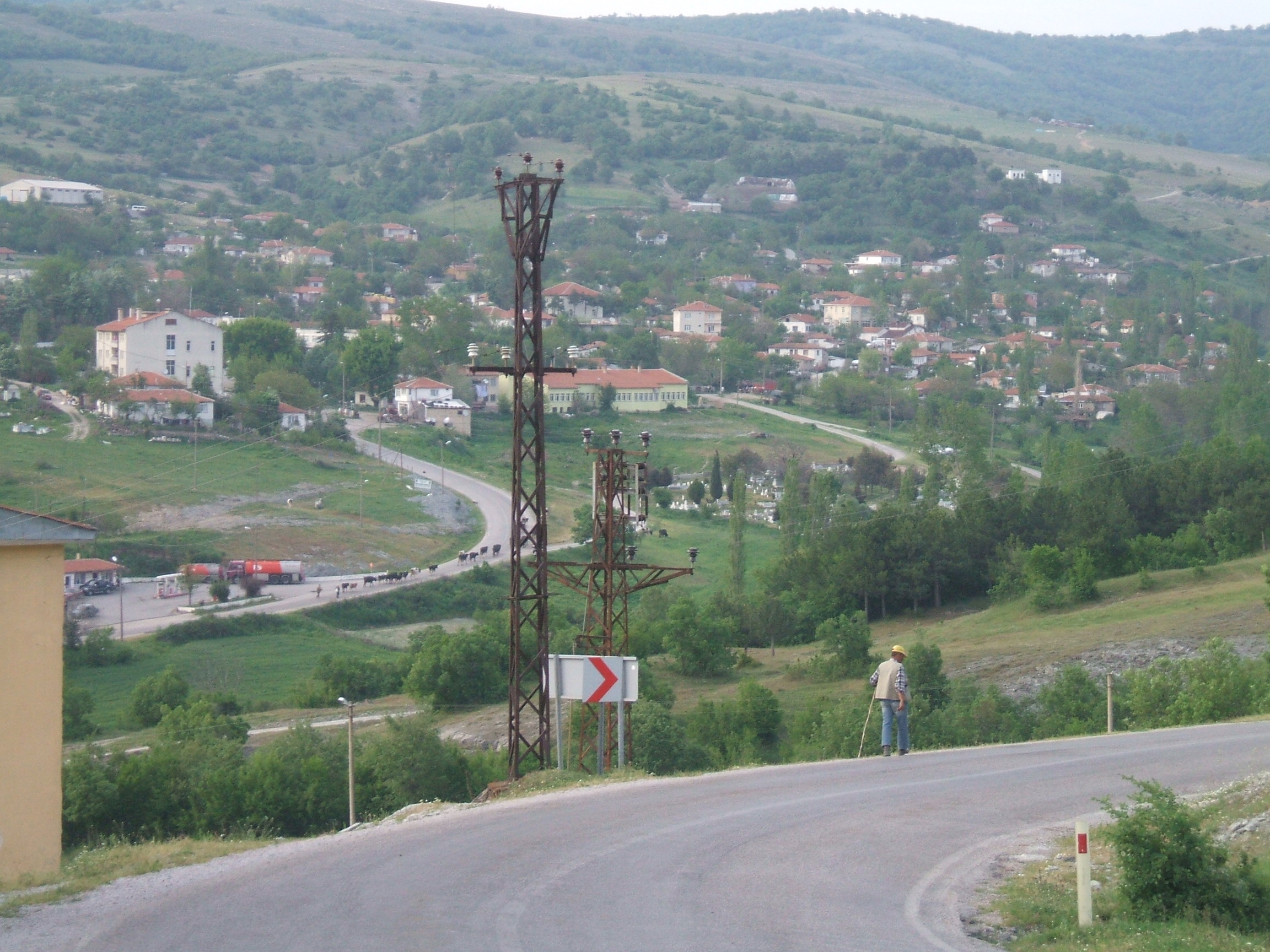

- Location within Turkey Location within Marmara
- Coordinates: 41°56′24″N 27°09′43″E
- Country: Turkey
- Province: Kırklareli
- District: Kofçaz

Government
  - Mayor: Levent Şenol (MHP)
- Elevation: 455 m (1,493 ft)
- Population (2022): 603
- Time zone: UTC+3 (TRT)
- Postal code: 39700
- Area code: 0288
- Climate: Cfb
- Website: www.kofcaz.bel.tr

Kofçaz is a town in Kırklareli Province in the Marmara region of Turkey. It is the seat of Kofçaz District. Its population is 603 (2022). The mayor is Levent Şenol (MHP). The nearby village of Ahlatlı, 30 km away, is the northernmost settlement in the country.

== History ==
Kofçaz became part of the Ottoman Empire in 1369 and became a district in 1953 with the appointment of a sub-governor (kaymakam).

== Geography ==
=== Climate ===
Climate data for Kofçaz
Month	Jan	Feb	Mar	Apr	May	Jun	Jul	Aug	Sep	Oct	Nov	Dec	Year
Mean daily maximum °C (°F)	4.4 (39.9)	6.3 (43.3)	9.7 (49.5)	15.7 (60.3)	21.0 (69.8)	25.3 (77.5)	28.2 (82.8)	27.8 (82.0)	24.1 (75.4)	17.6 (63.7)	12.0 (53.6)	6.7 (44.1)	16.6 (61.8)
Daily mean °C (°F)	1.1 (34.0)	2.7 (36.9)	5.2 (41.4)	10.3 (50.5)	15.1 (59.2)	19.2 (66.6)	21.6 (70.9)	21.3 (70.3)	17.9 (64.2)	12.7 (54.9)	8.0 (46.4)	3.4 (38.1)	11.5 (52.8)
Mean daily minimum °C (°F)	−2.1 (28.2)	−0.8 (30.6)	0.8 (33.4)	5.0 (41.0)	9.3 (48.7)	13.1 (55.6)	15.1 (59.2)	14.9 (58.8)	11.7 (53.1)	7.9 (46.2)	4.0 (39.2)	0.2 (32.4)	6.6 (43.9)
Average precipitation mm (inches)	64 (2.5)	56 (2.2)	51 (2.0)	56 (2.2)	60 (2.4)	53 (2.1)	33 (1.3)	30 (1.2)	44 (1.7)	50 (2.0)	80 (3.1)	78 (3.1)	655 (25.8)
Source: Climate-data.org
