= Babaeski =

- Municipality
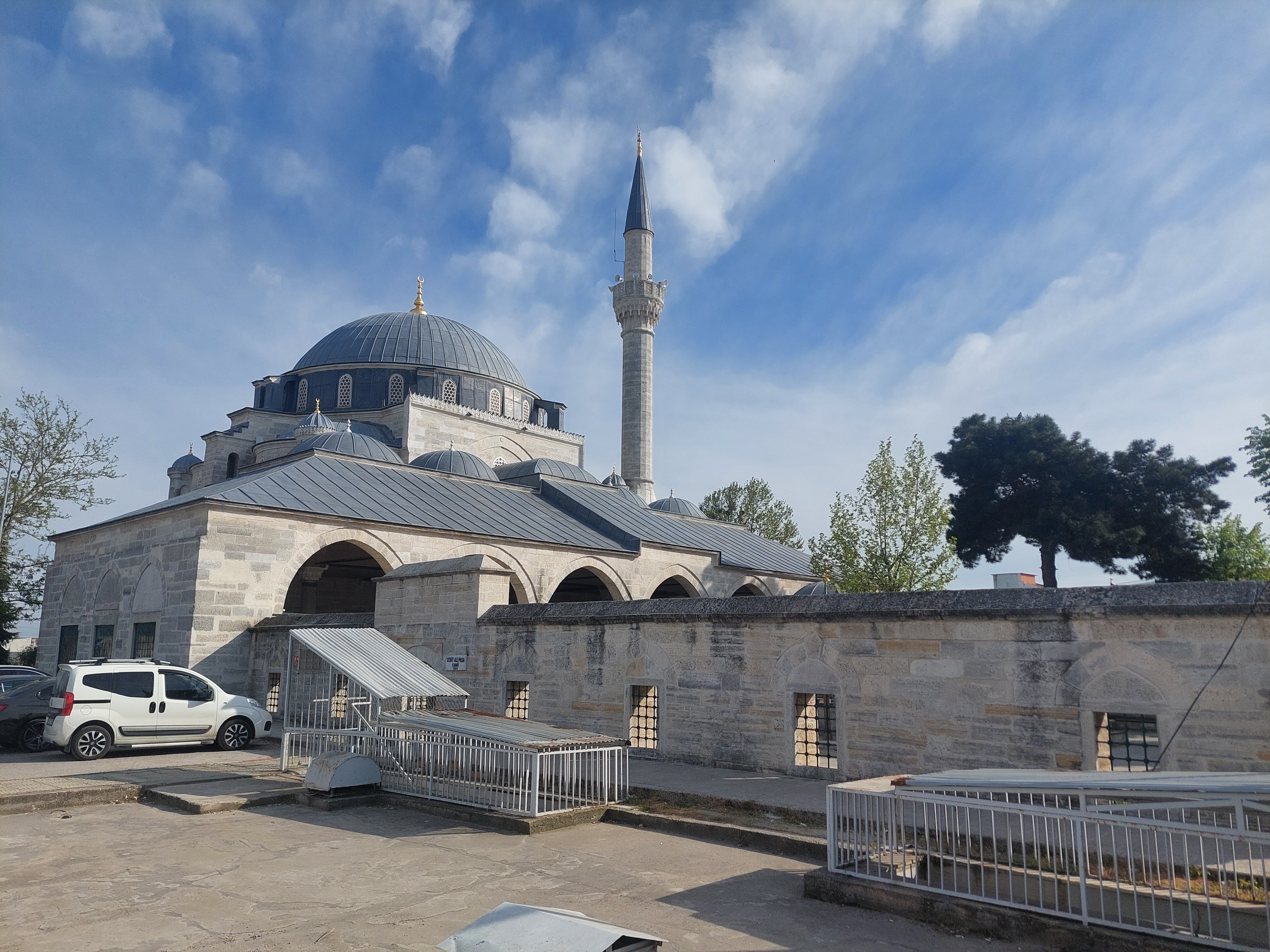
- Cedid Ali Pasha Mosque

- Location within Turkey Location within Marmara
- Coordinates: 41°25′57″N 27°05′35″E
- Country: Turkey
- Province: Kırklareli
- District: Babaeski

Government
  - Mayor: Firat Yayla (AKP)
- Elevation: 55 m (180 ft)
- Population (2022): 29,215
- Time zone: UTC+3 (TRT)
- Area code: 0288
- Climate: Csa
- Website: babaeski-bld.gov.tr

Babaeski (Greek: Αρτεσκός) is a town in Kırklareli Province in the Marmara region of Turkey. It is the seat of Babaeski District. Its population is 29,215 (2022).

== Name ==
The name Babaeski is believed to have originated according to the following legend: the Ottoman Sultan, Mehmet the Conqueror, stopped in town on his way to Constantinople before the final siege of the city. He happened to meet an old man in front of the old mosque which is nowadays called Small Mosque (Küçük Cami) and asked him when the town was established. The man replied "Eskidir, eski," meaning "It is old, old." When the Sultan asked the man's age, he replied again, "Baba... eski," which means "The father is old." From then on, the name Babaeski has been used for the town.

== History ==
In Byzantine times, the area was known as Boulgarophygon (Βουλγαρόφυγον in Byzantine Greek), and was the site of a major Byzantine defeat by the Bulgarians in 896. In Greek is known as Arteskos (Αρτεσκός). In Ancient times, the city was also called Burtudizon, latinized as Burdidizum.

== Facts ==
Babaeski lies on a relatively flat landscape where the highest point does not exceed 150 m. The Devil Stream (Şeytan Deresi) flows through the land of the district. Agriculture is the main industry. Sunflowers, wheat are the main crops grown along with some vegetables. Industrial development has sped up in the last decade mainly in the form of textile factories.

Babaeski hosts the annual Babaeski Agricultural Festival in late July to early August where national singers perform.

== Population ==
The population in Babaeski and villages who belong to Babaeski District, are of different background, like Anatolian Turks, Balkan Turks-Muhacir, Yörüks, Amuca tribe, Muslim Megleno-Romanians, Pomaks, Romani people in Turkey and Crimean Tatars, are Cultural Muslims, who belong to the Hanafi school of Sunni Islam.

== Sights ==
Some historical sites in Babaeski are:

- Eski Cami (The Old Mosque), built during the Mehmet the Conqueror period in 1467. It is still in use.
- Cedid Ali Paşa Camii, built by the great architect, Sinan, during the period of Süleyman the Magnificent in 1555. It is built in the style of the great Selimiye Mosque in Edirne which is also designed by Sinan. It was destroyed by the Bulgarian army during the Balkan Wars and was later reconstructed. It is also still open for worship.
- Dördüzlü Çeşme (The Tetrahedral Fountain), built in the 17th century. It has four sides and a dome centered in a square.

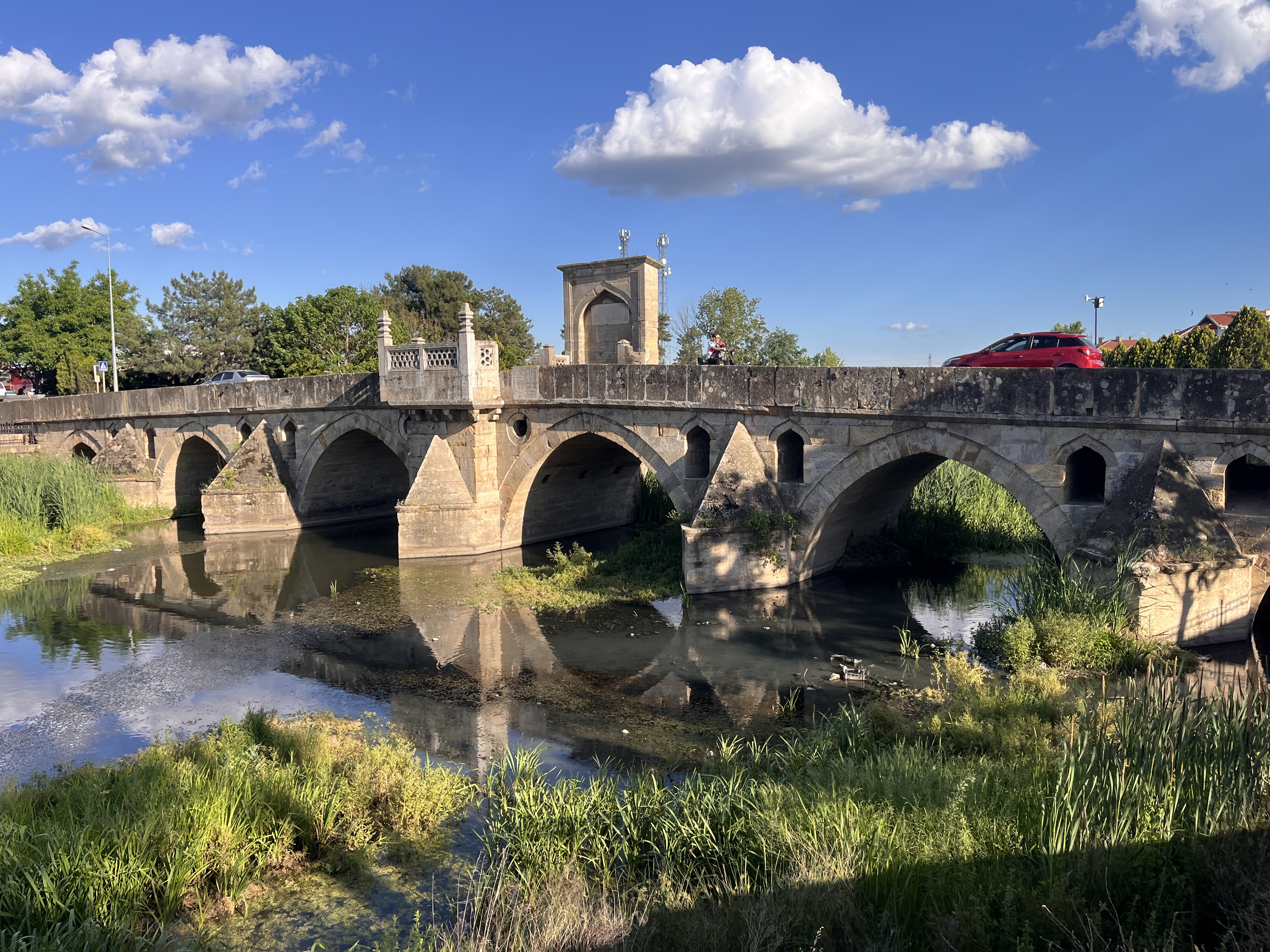
Babaeski Bridge

- Babaeski Bridge, built in 1633 during the period of Murad IV. It is part of D-100 international highway and is still in use.
- The Bath, built in the classical single dome style. It is also still in use.
- Atatürk Elementary School, built by the then sub-governor (kaymakam) Tevfik Gür in 1914. It is a one-story building with wooden roof and Ottoman Turkish style eaves. It now serves as the vocational school of the University of Thrace.

== Gallery ==
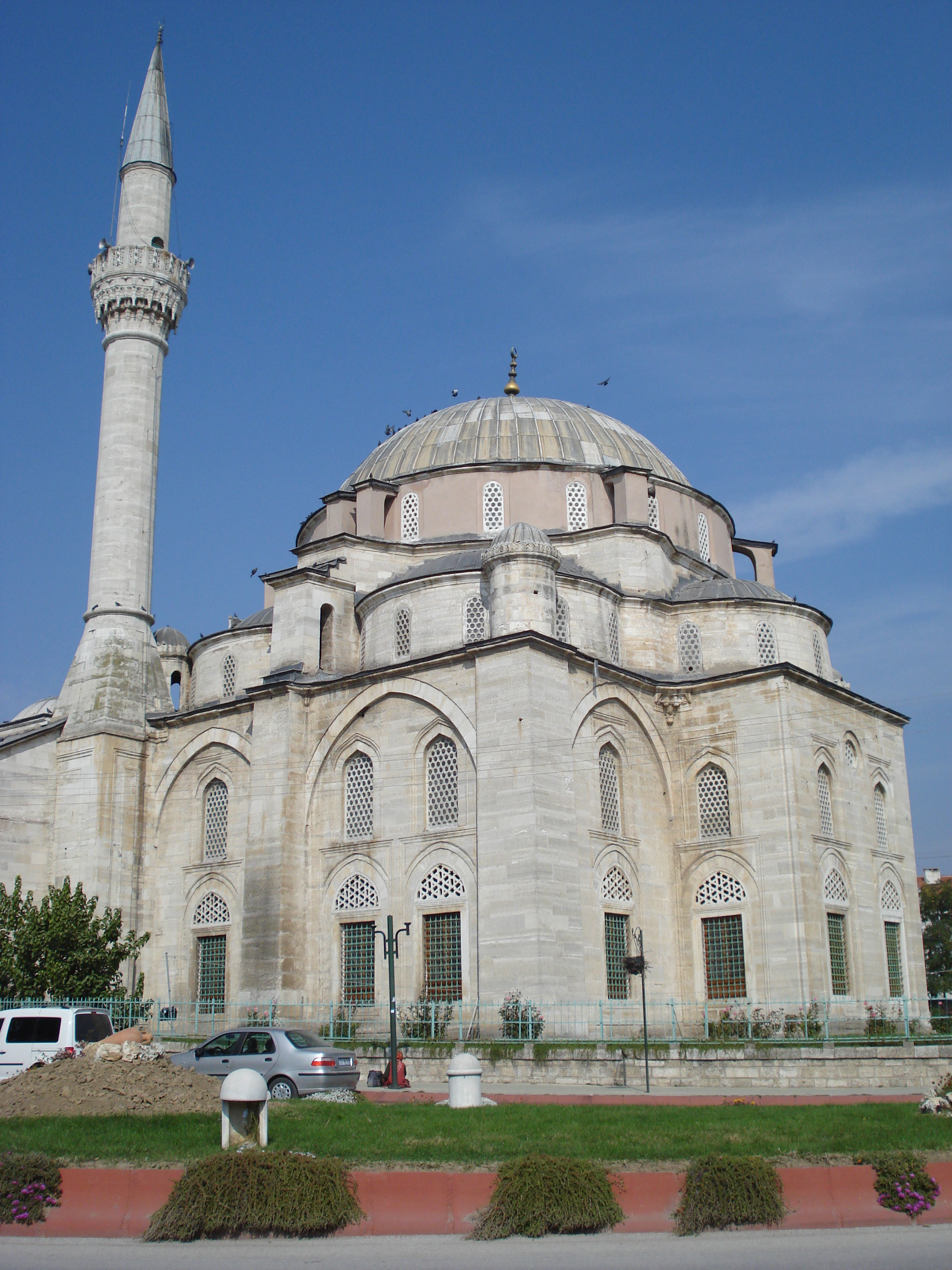
Cedid Ali Paşa Mosque before restoration

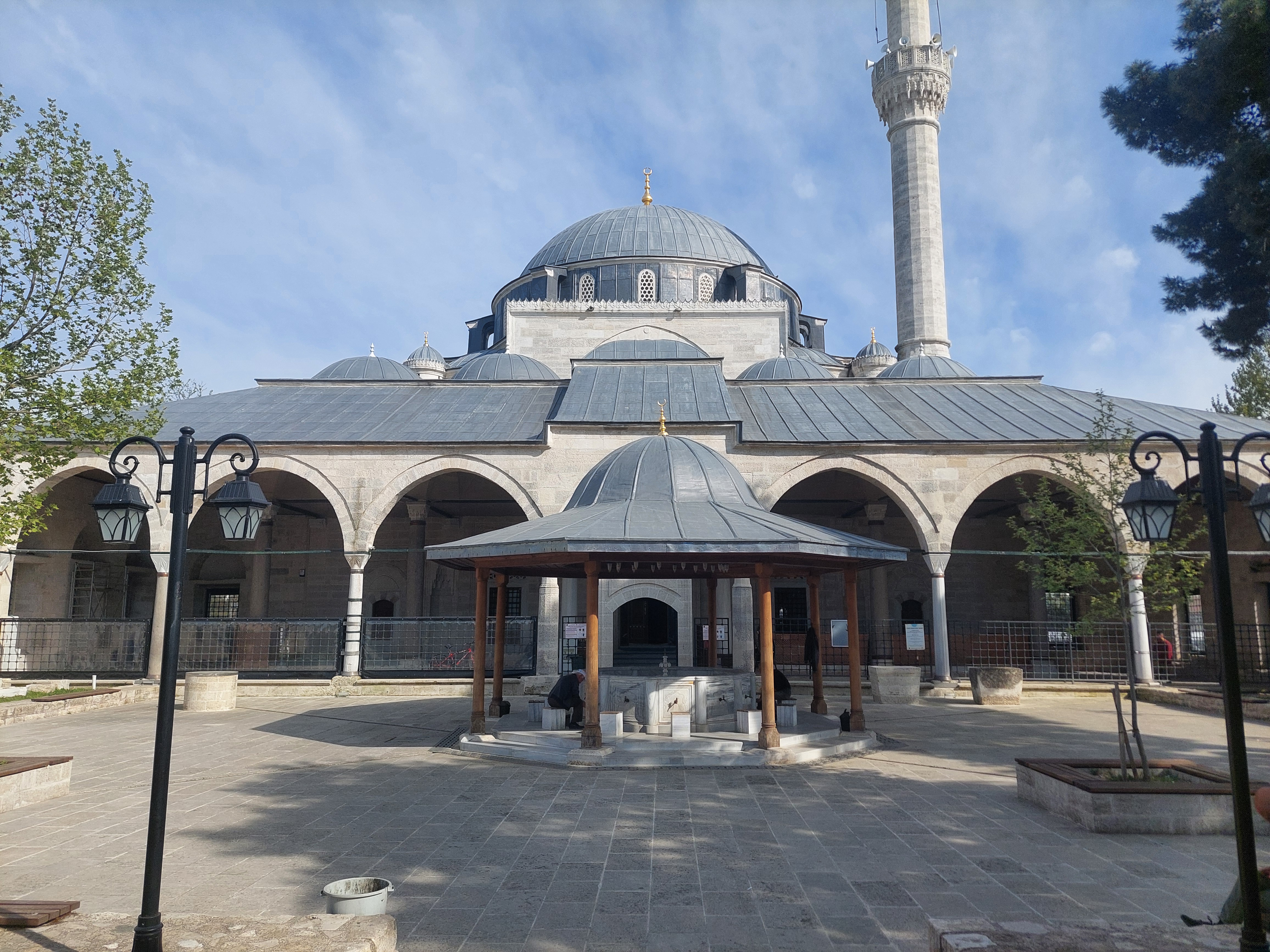
Front view of Cedid Ali Paşa Mosque after restoration

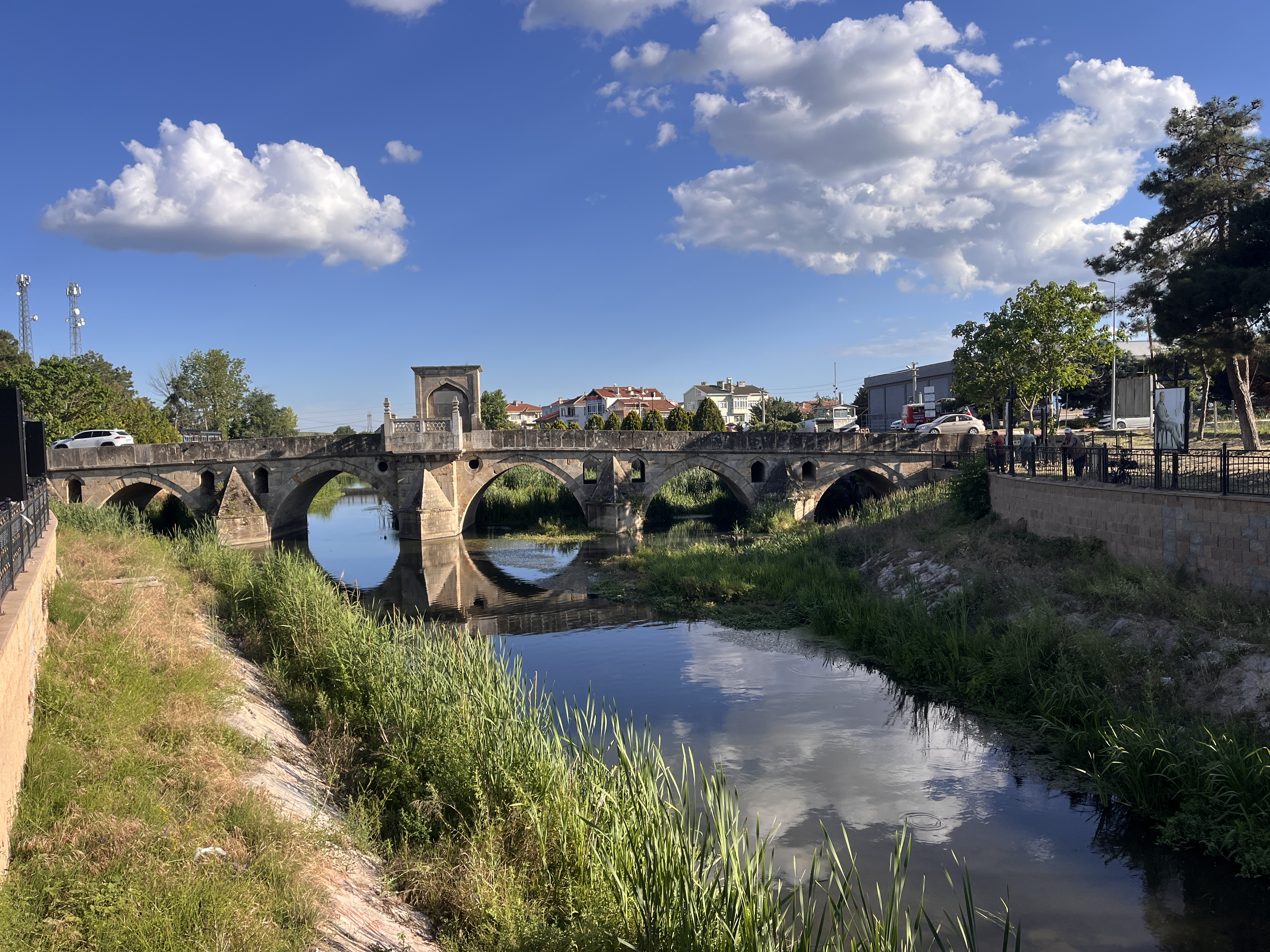
Babaeski Bridge

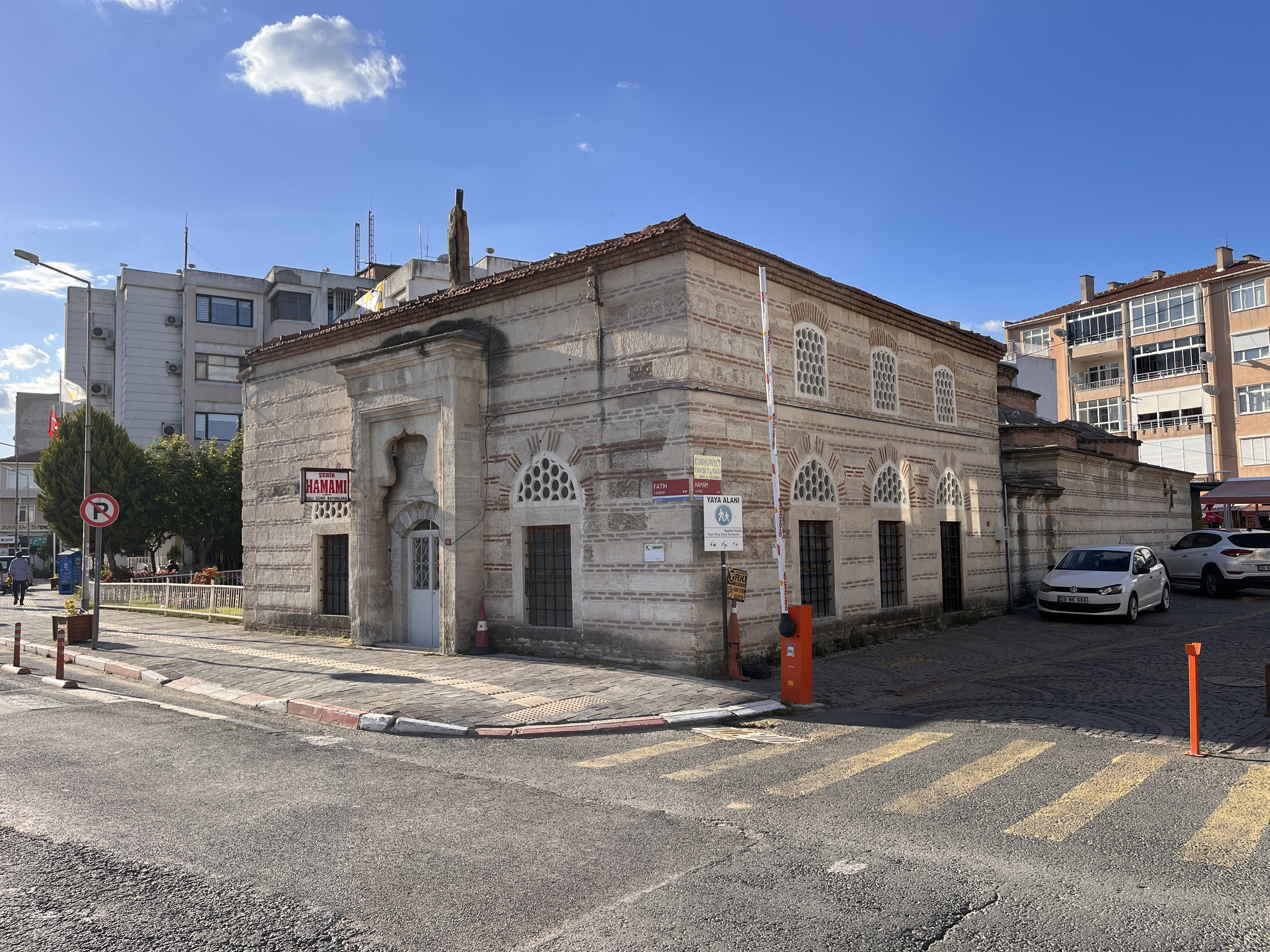
Babaeski Hamam

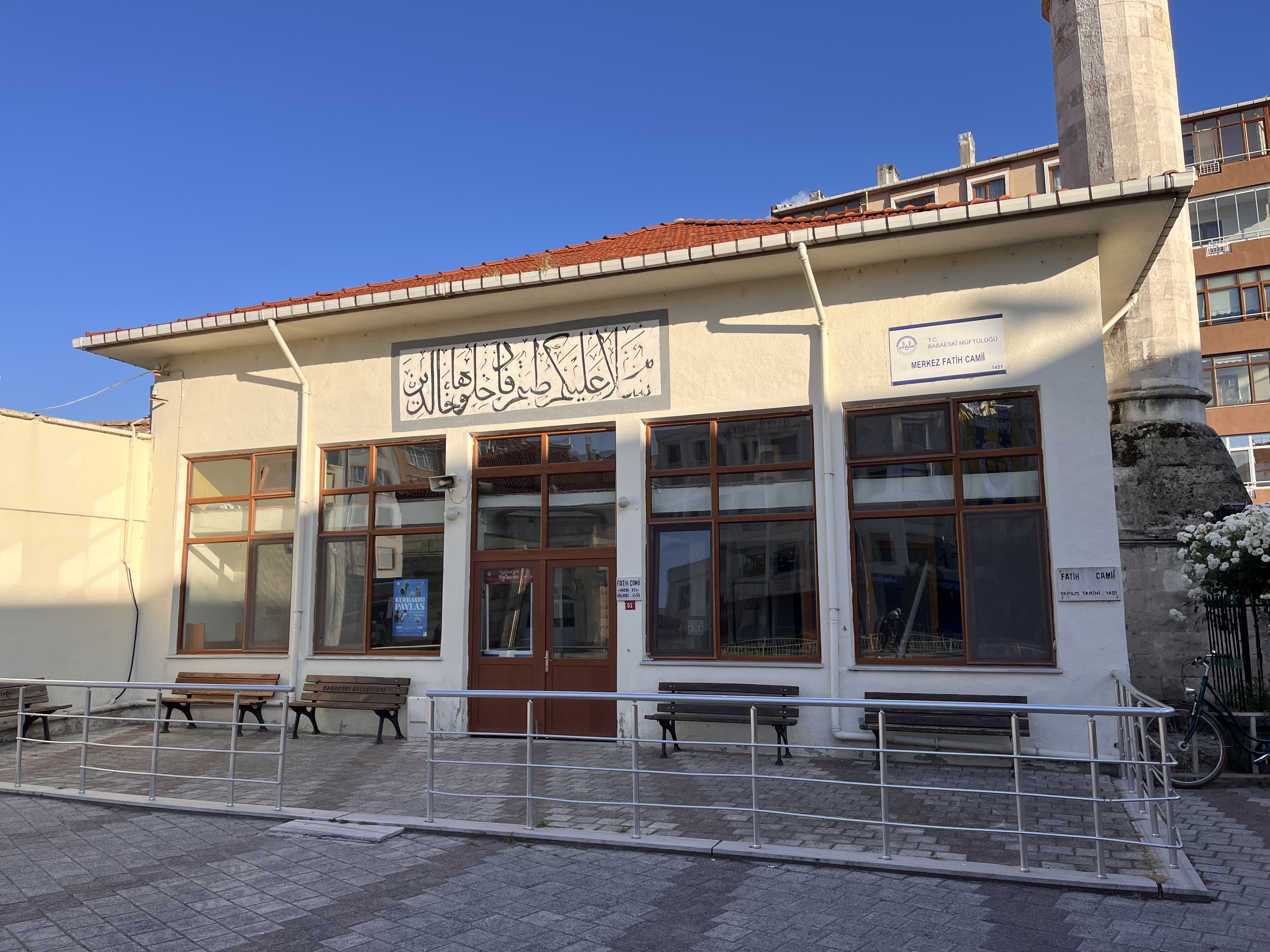
Babaeski Fatih Mosque

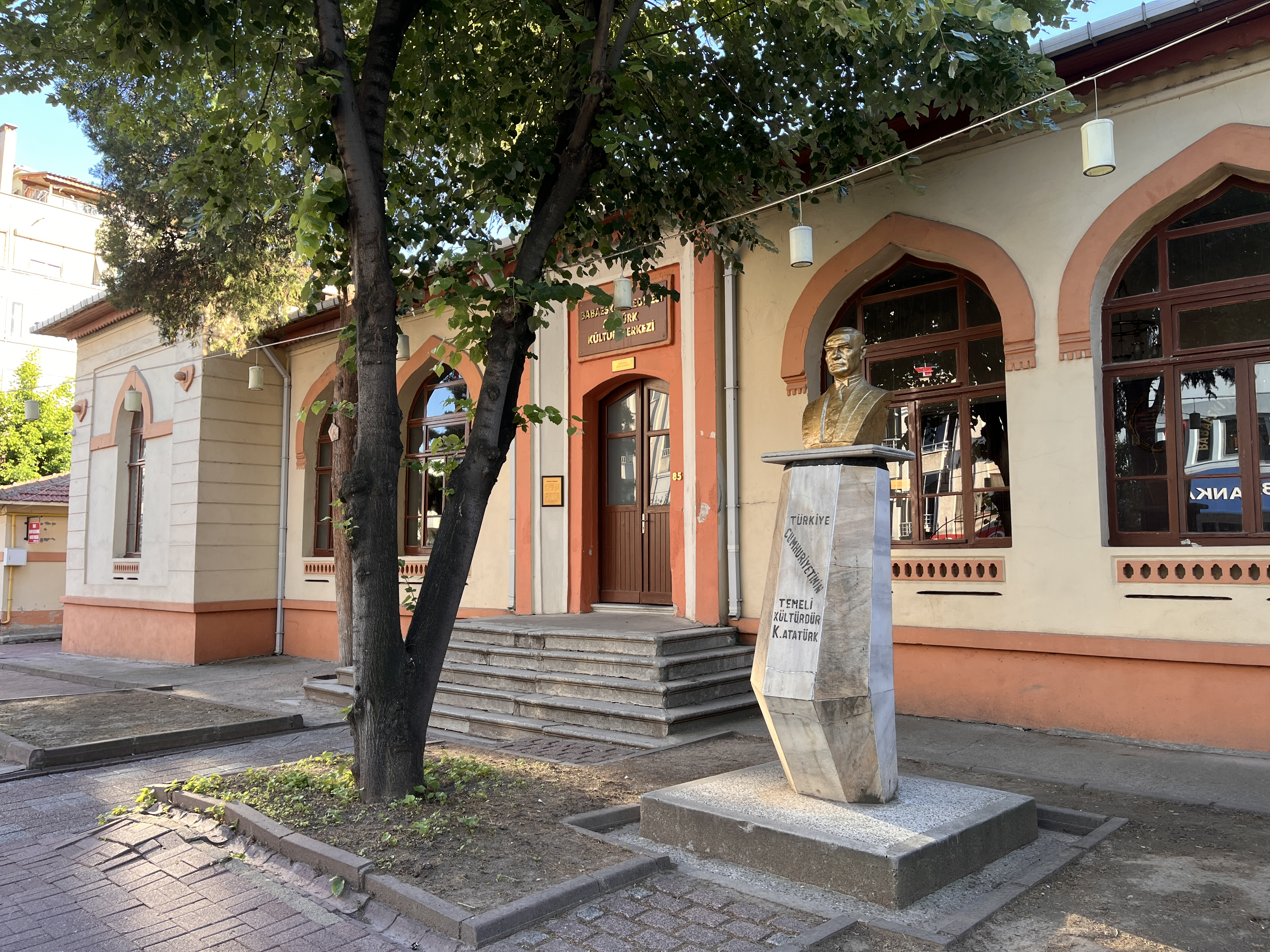
Babaeski old school building

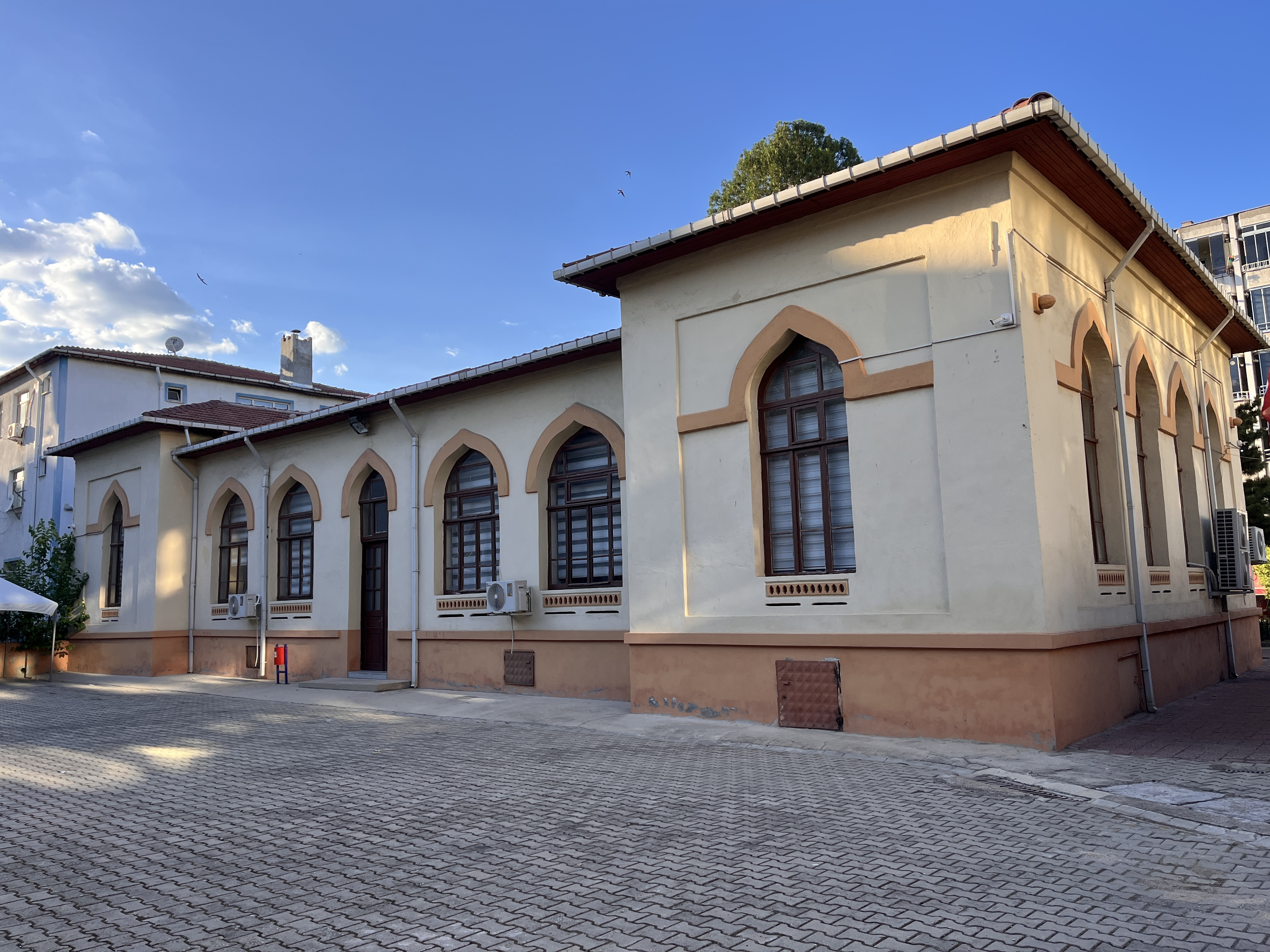
Babaeski old school building exterior

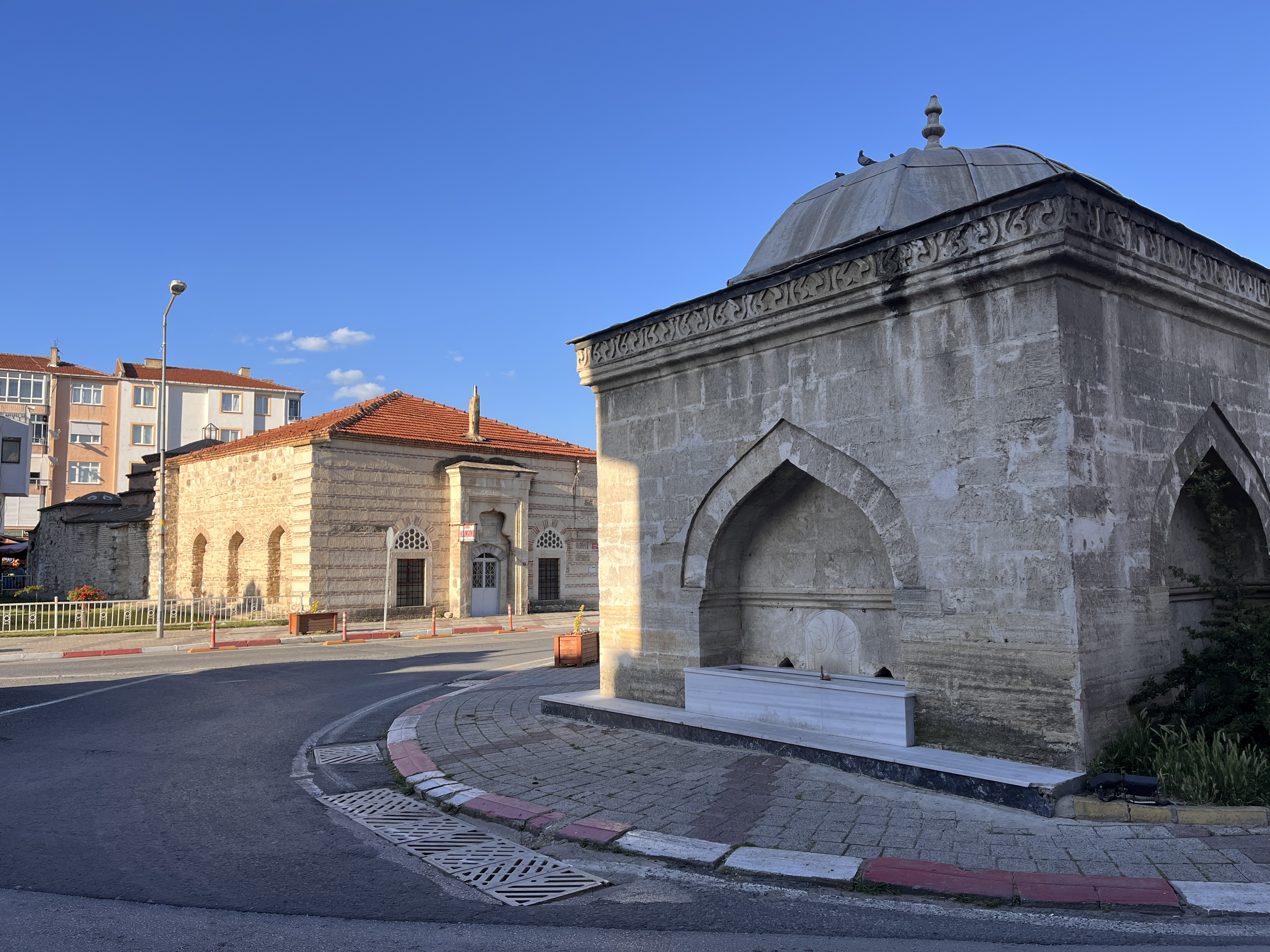
Babaeski Dört Yüzlü Fountain

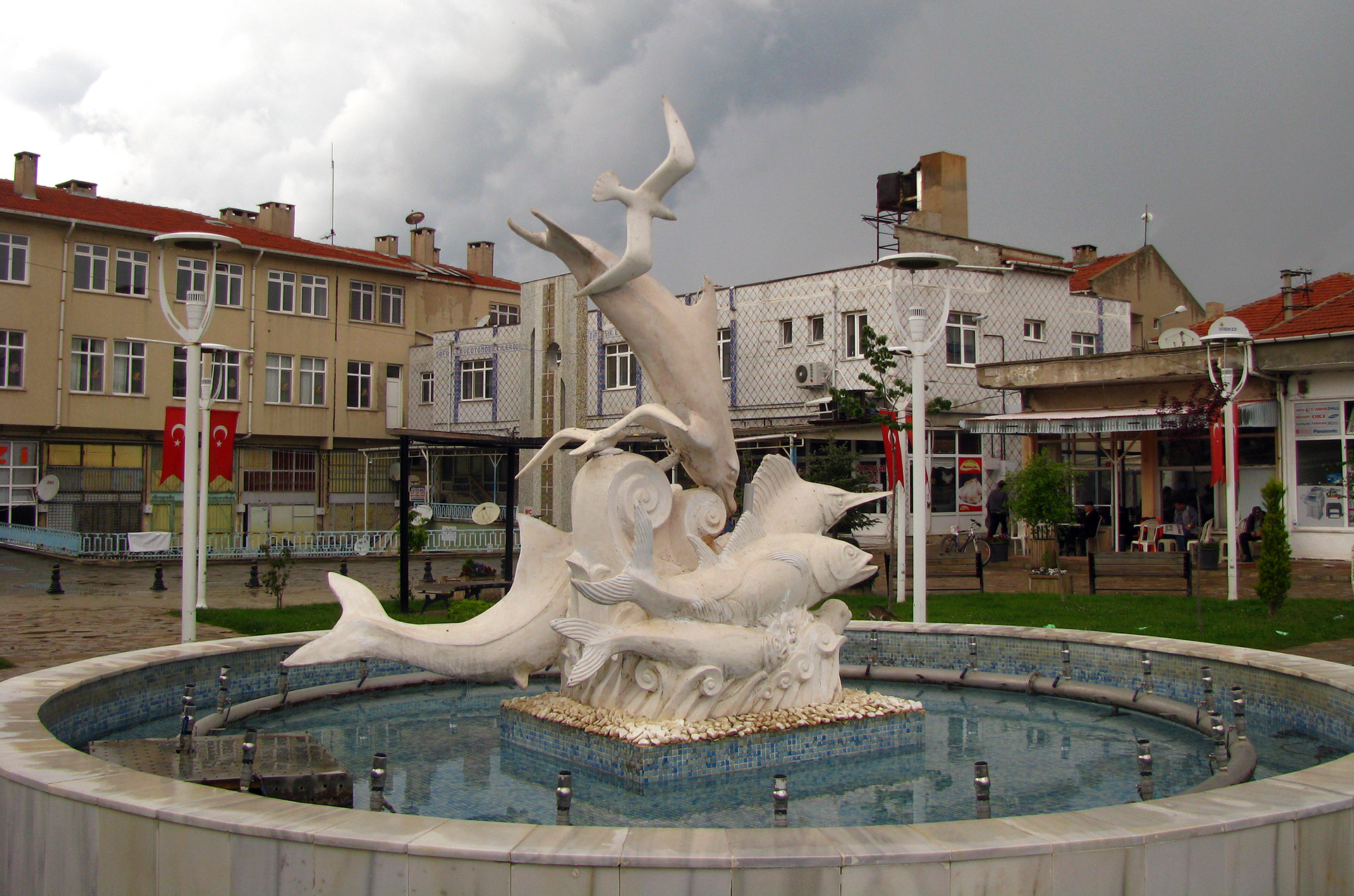
A fountain in Babaeski

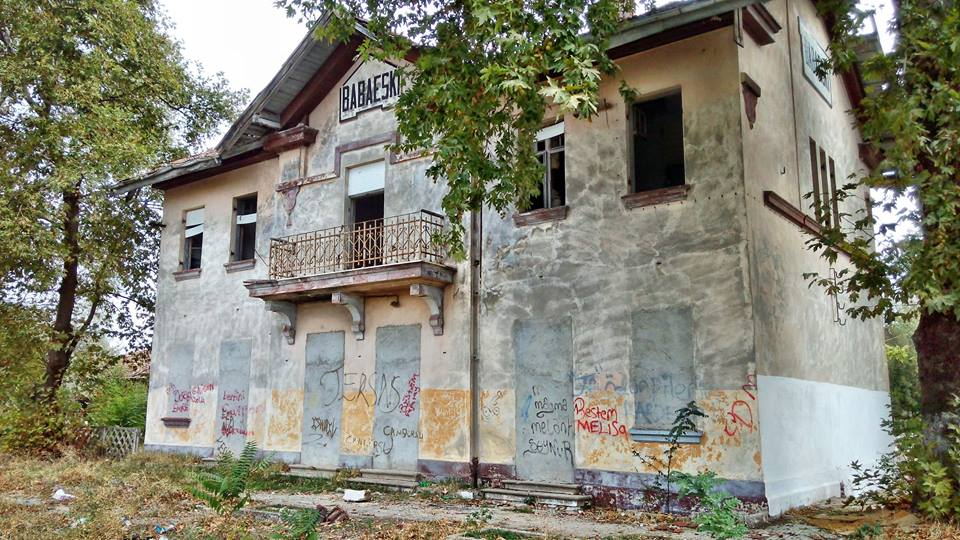
Abandoned train station in Babaeski

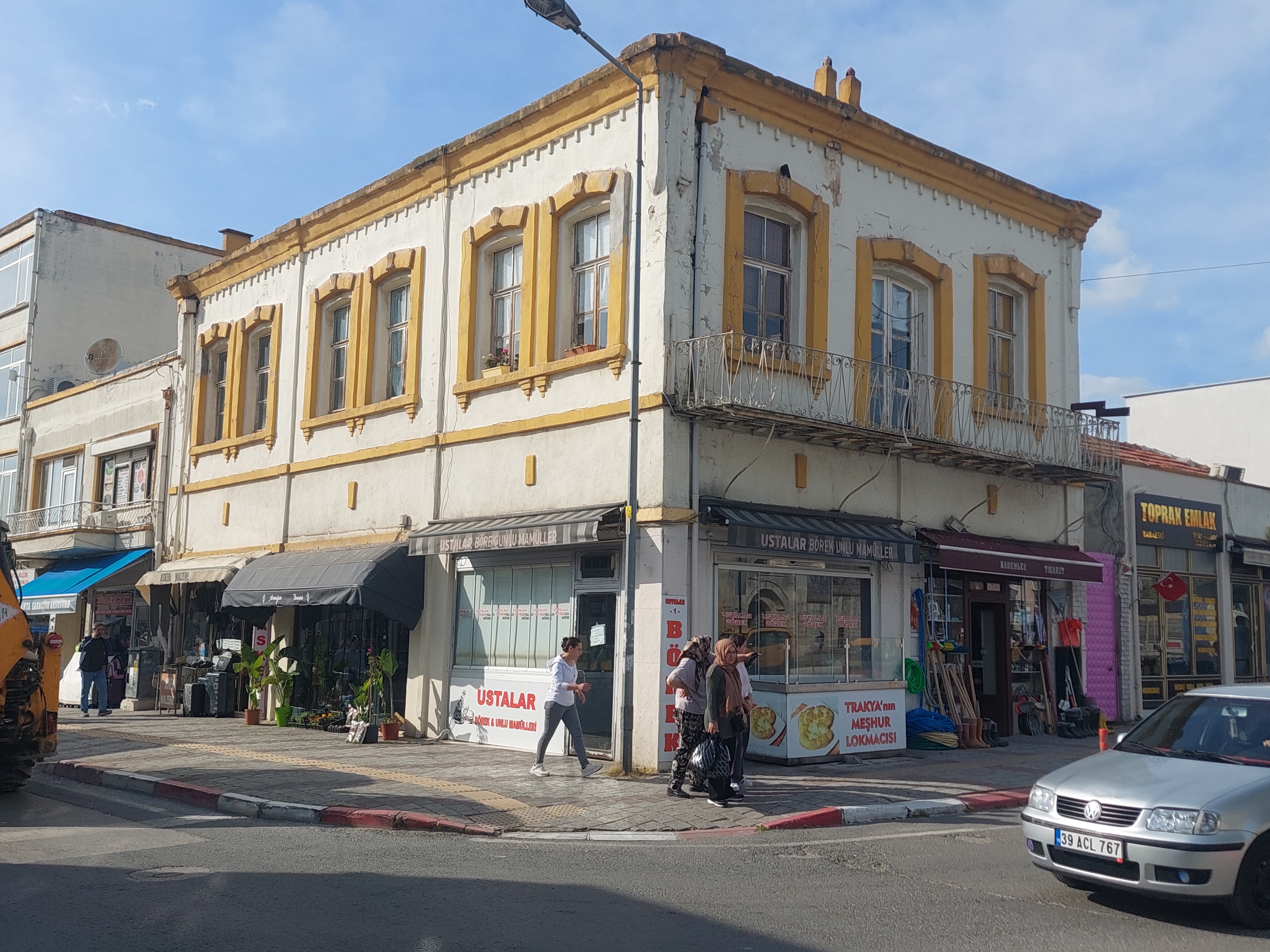
Konak — Hacıhasan, Fatih Street in Babaeski
