= Kırklareli Province =

Province of Turkey

Coordinates: 41°40′52″N 27°28′17″E

Kırklareli Province Kırklareli ili
- Province
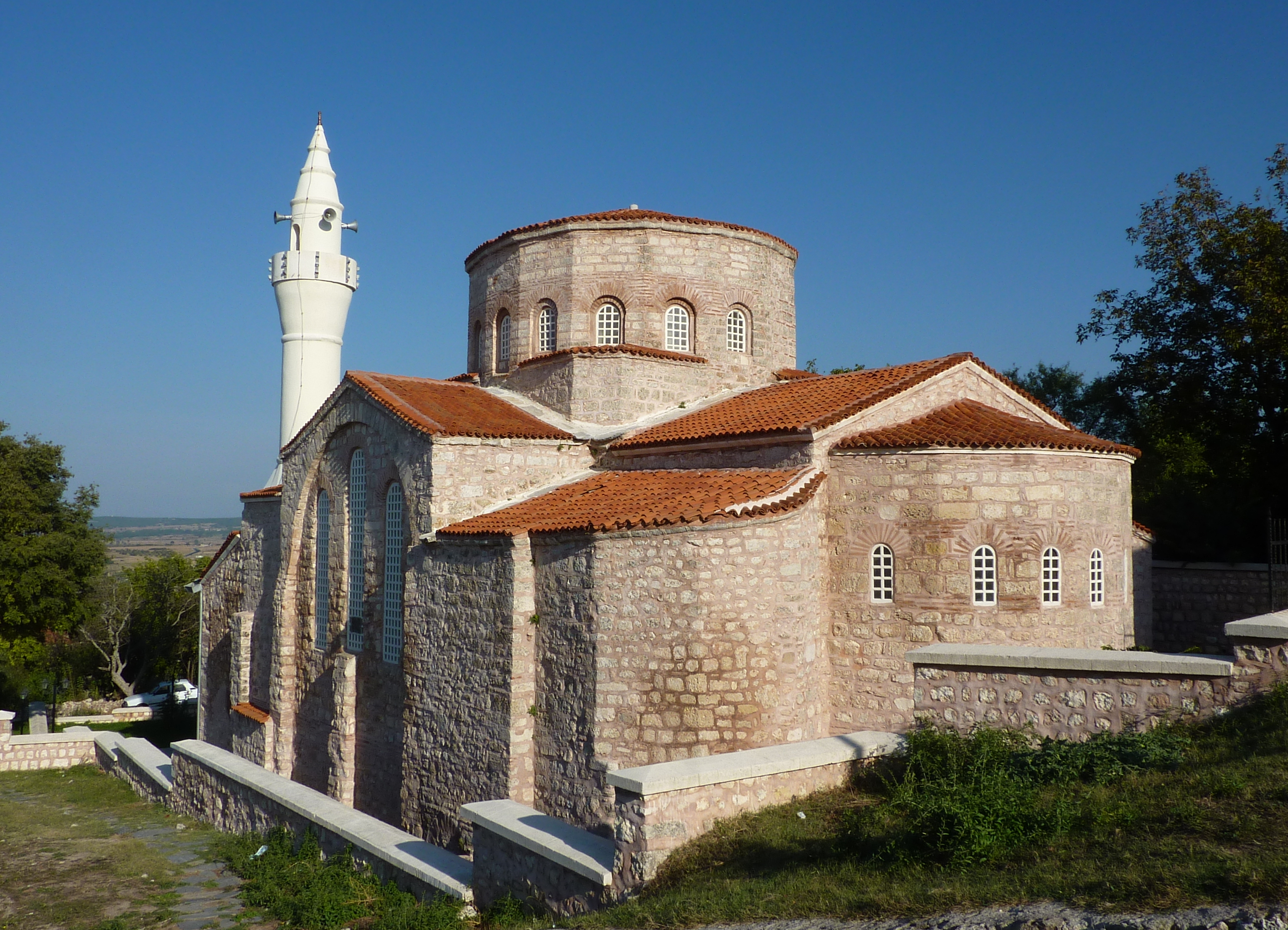
- Little Hagia Sophia of Vize

- Location of the province within Turkey
- Country: Turkey
- Seat: Kırklareli

Government
  - Governor: Ugur Turan
- Area: 6,459 km^{2} (2,494 sq mi)
- Population (2022): 369,347
  - Density: 57.18/km^{2} (148.1/sq mi)
- Time zone: UTC+3 (TRT)
- Area code: 0288
- Website: www.kirklareli.gov.tr

Kırklareli Province (Turkish: Kırklareli ili) is a province in northwestern Turkey on the west coast of the Black Sea. The province neighbours Bulgaria to the north along a 180-kilometre (110 mi) long border. It borders the province of Edirne to the west, the province of Tekirdağ to the south, and the province of Istanbul to the southeast. Kırklareli is the capital city of the province. Its area is 6,459 km^{2}, and its population is 369,347 (2022).

The province's and its central city's name means "the land of the forties" in Turkish and it may refer either to the forty Ottoman ghazis sent by the sultan Murad I to conquer the city for the Ottoman Empire in the 14th century or to the forty churches reported to be situated in the region before the Ottoman conquest, as attested by the former name of Kırklareli (Kırk Kilise in Turkish; Σαράντα Εκκλησιές). There is a memorial on a hilltop in Kırklareli city, called "Kırklar Anıtı" (the Memorial of the Forties in Turkish) to honor the Ottoman conquerors (For more on the name's origins, see Kırklareli). The province is bisected by the Yıldız (Istranca) mountain range. The north and northeastern parts of the province are among the least populated and under developed parts of Turkey. The districts to the south and west are more populated because the land is better suited for agriculture and industrial development. The north and eastern parts of the province are dominated by forests. Therefore, forestry is an important means of living in these areas. Fishing is done along the Black Sea coast.

== History ==
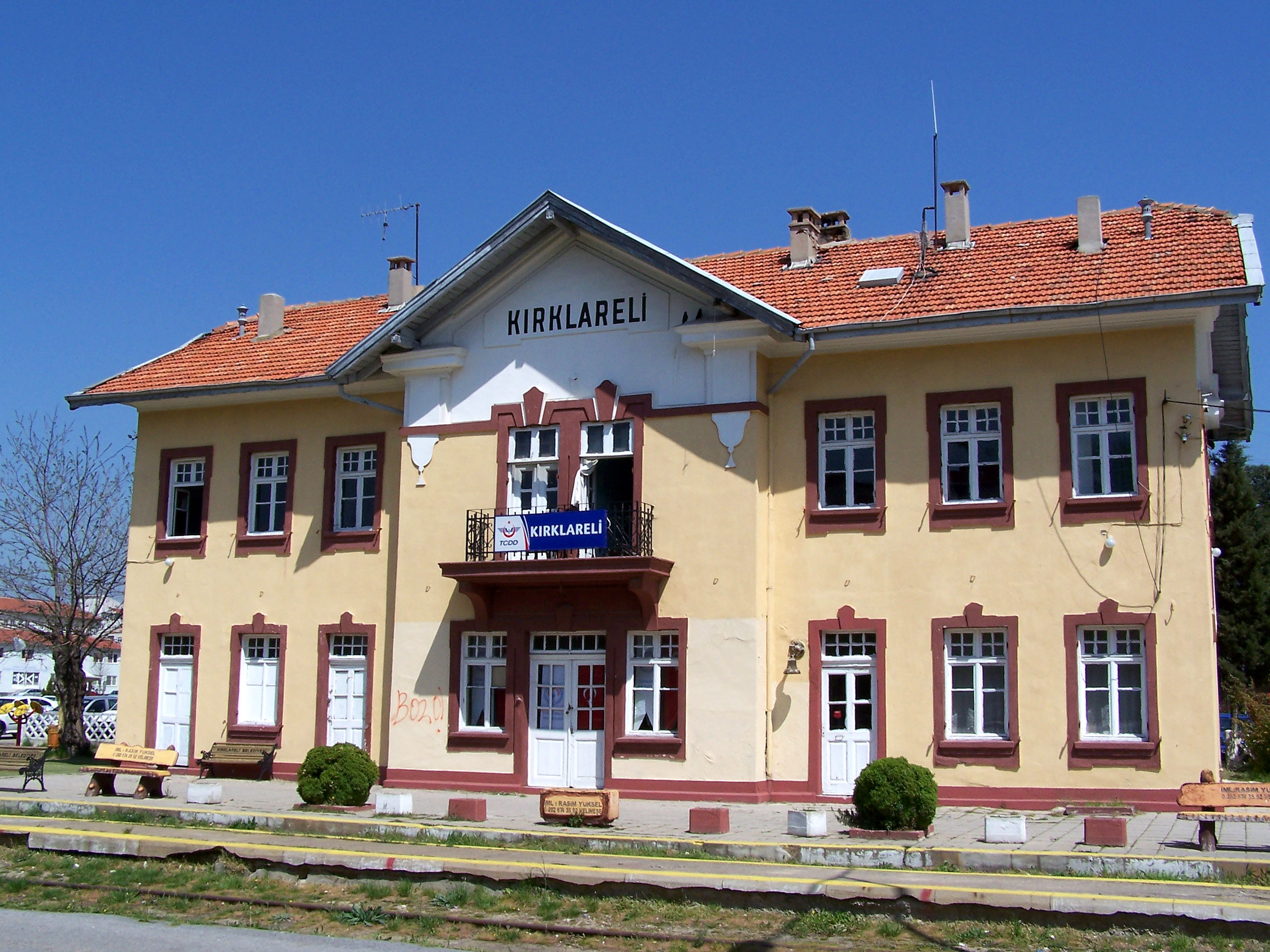
Kırklareli Train Station

The province was included in the Second Inspectorate General, which established on the 19 February 1934 and extended over the provinces of Edirne, Çanakkale, Kırklareli, Tekirdağ. It was governed by an Inspector General, who had extensive authorities over civilian, military and educational matters. The office of the Inspectorate-General was abandoned in 1948 but the legal framework of the Inspectorate-Generals was only abolished in 1952, under the Government of the Democrat Party.

== Agriculture ==
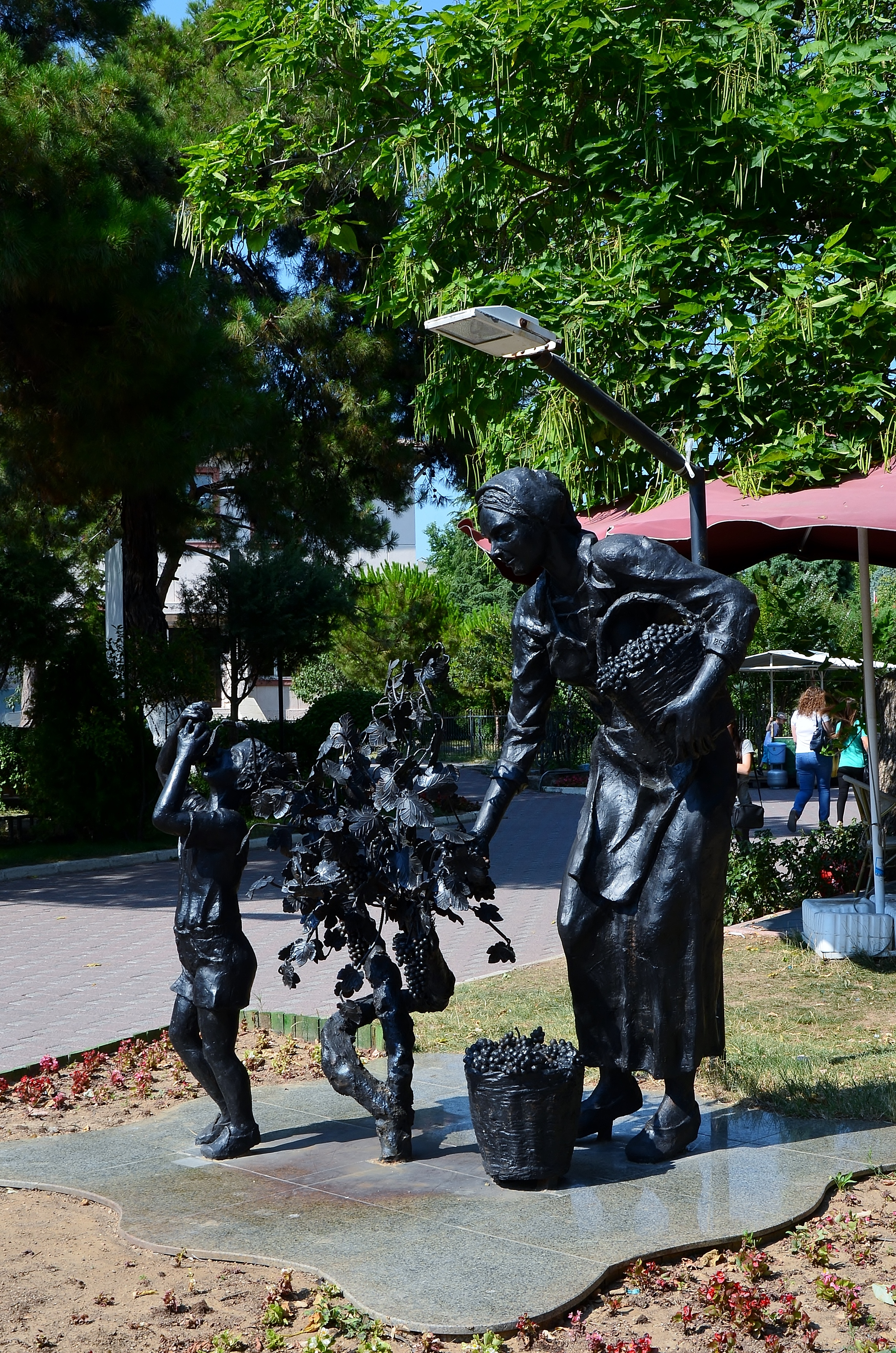
Statue of wine grape harvesting woman with child in downtown Kırklareli.

The province of Kırklareli is an important region for viticulture and winemaking. A syrup called "Hardaliye", made of grape, cherry leaves and mustard seeds, is a non-alcoholic beverage special to the region.

== Districts ==
Districts of Kırklareli province

Kırklareli province is divided into eight districts (capital district in bold):

- Babaeski
- Demirköy
- **Kırklareli**
- Kofçaz
- Lüleburgaz
- Pehlivanköy
- Pınarhisar
- Vize

== Local attractions ==
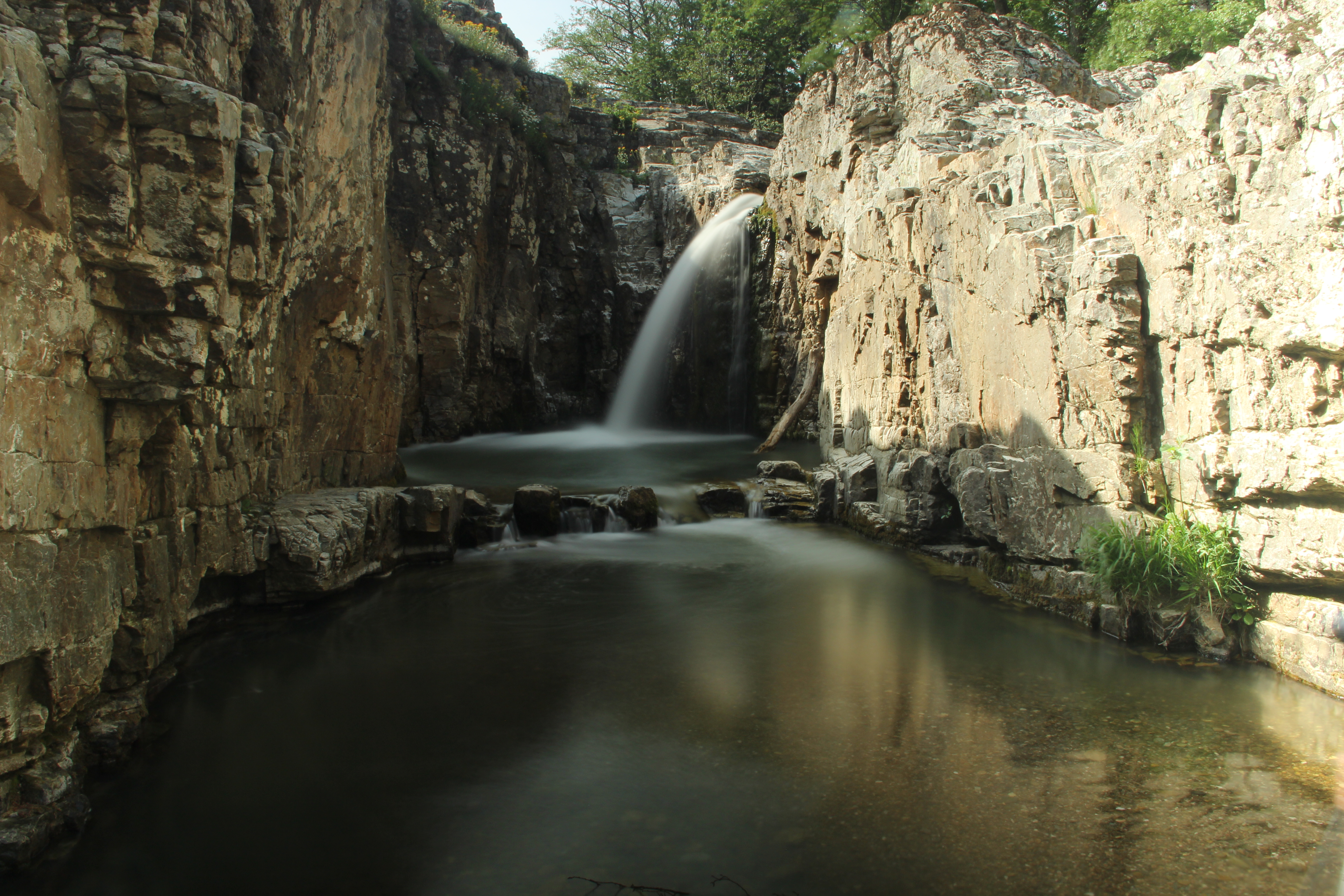
Cehennem Şelaleleri, "Hell Waterfalls", Vize, Kırklareli.

- **Dupnisa Cave** is a famous natural attraction and a unique geological formation within the borders of the province in the north. The 60 km long coast along the Black Sea harbors one of the most pristine and undeveloped beaches in all of Turkey. There are two Nature Reserve Areas along the coast namely Saka Gölü (Saka Lake) Nature Reserve Area to the north and Kasatura Körfezi (Kasatura Bay) Nature Reserve Area to the south. These sites are unique with their undisturbed ecosystems harboring several endangered and endemic plant and animal species.
- **Little Hagia Sophia Church of Vize**, also known as Gazi Suleyman Pasha Mosque.
- **Koyunbaba Köyü Kilisesi**
- **Hızırbey Mosque Fountain**

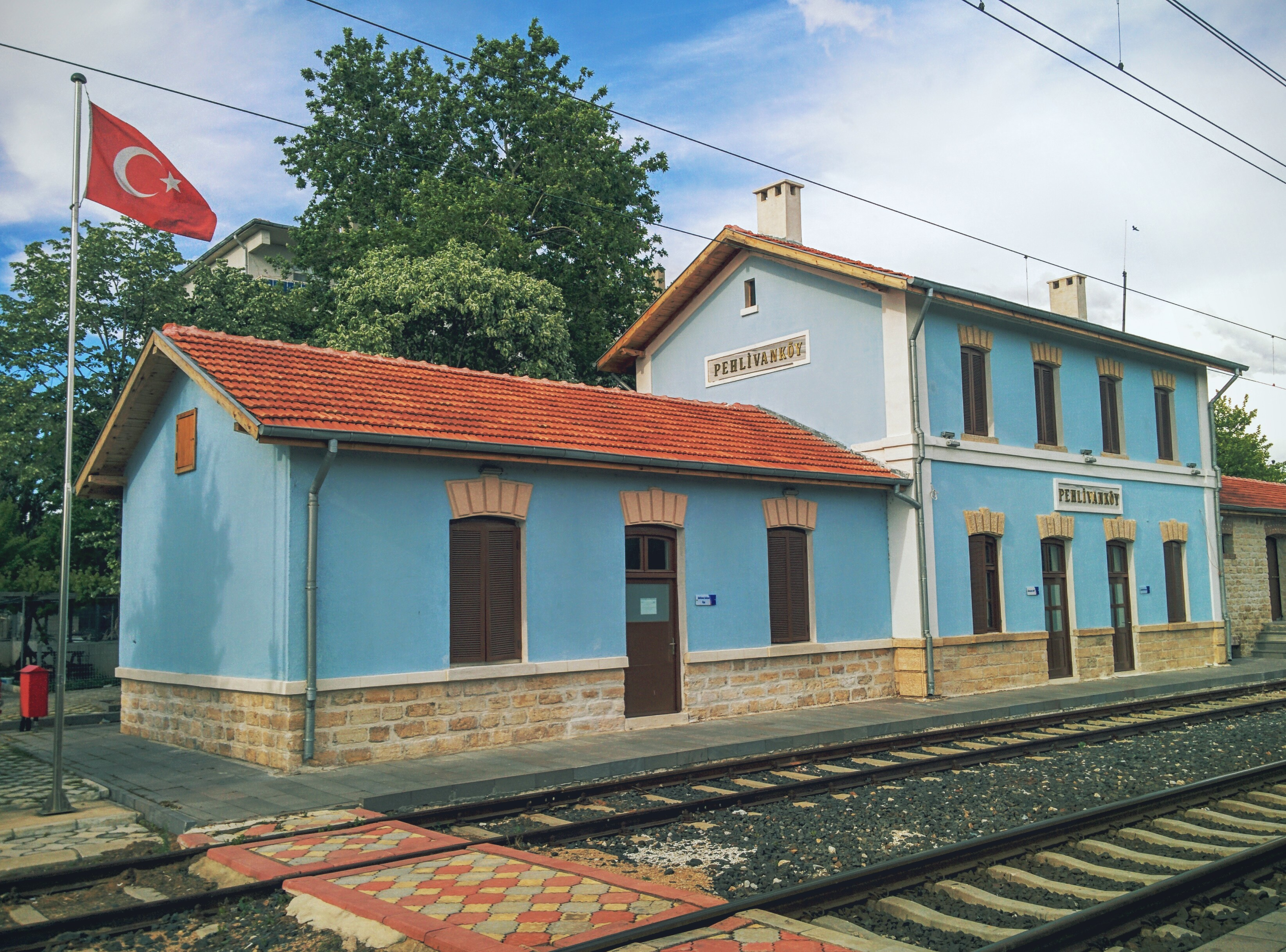
Pehlivanköy Train Station

== Sister cities ==
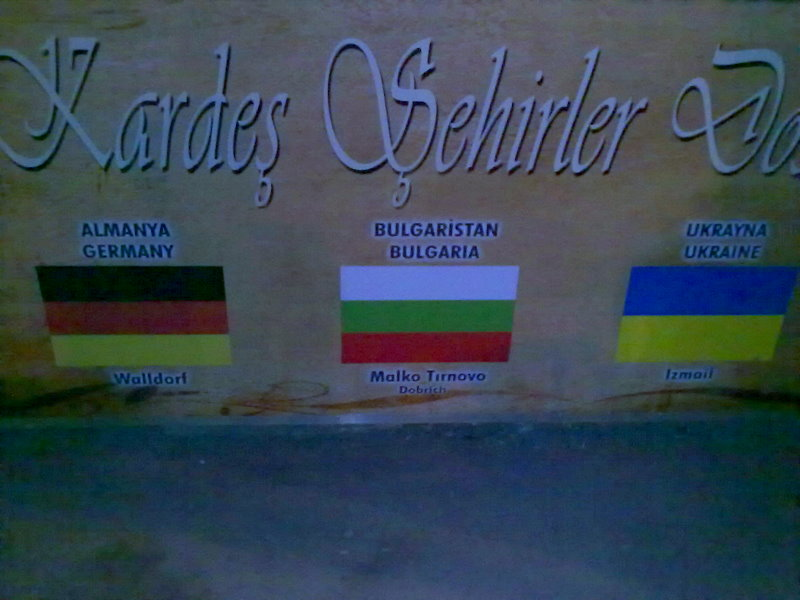
Sister cities (Kardeş şehirler)

Kırklareli is twinned with:

- Walldorf, Germany
- Dobrich, Bulgaria
- Izmail, Ukraine

== See also ==
- List of populated places in Kırklareli Province
