= Dupnisa Cave =

Show cave in Kırklareli Province, Turkey

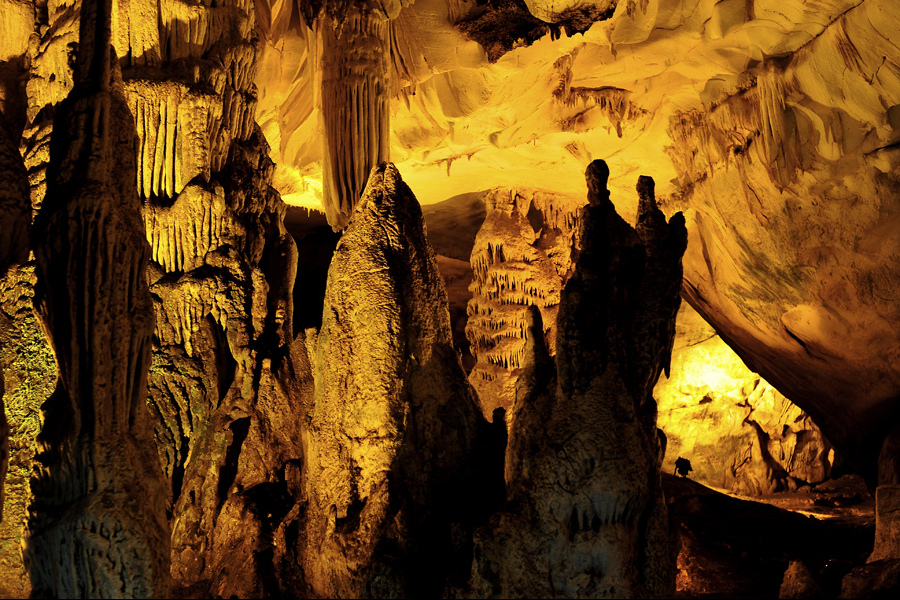
- A view from the inside Dupnisa Cave

- Location within Turkey
- Location: Sarpdere, Demirköy, Kırklareli
- Coordinates: 41°50′26″N 27°33′22″E
- Length: 3,200 m (10,500 ft)
- Elevation: 345–405 m (1,132–1,329 ft)
- Show cave opened: 2005; 21 years ago
- Visitors: 120,000 (2013)

The Dupnisa Cave (Turkish: Dupnisa Mağarası), aka Dupnisa Caves, is a show cave located in Kırklareli Province, northwestern Turkey, close to Bulgarian-Turkish border. The cave itself, unlike what the original name suggests, is actually three, interconnected caves divided into two separate floors. Its name is derived from the Bulgarian word Dupnitsa (Дупница), related to the word for "hole".

== Location ==
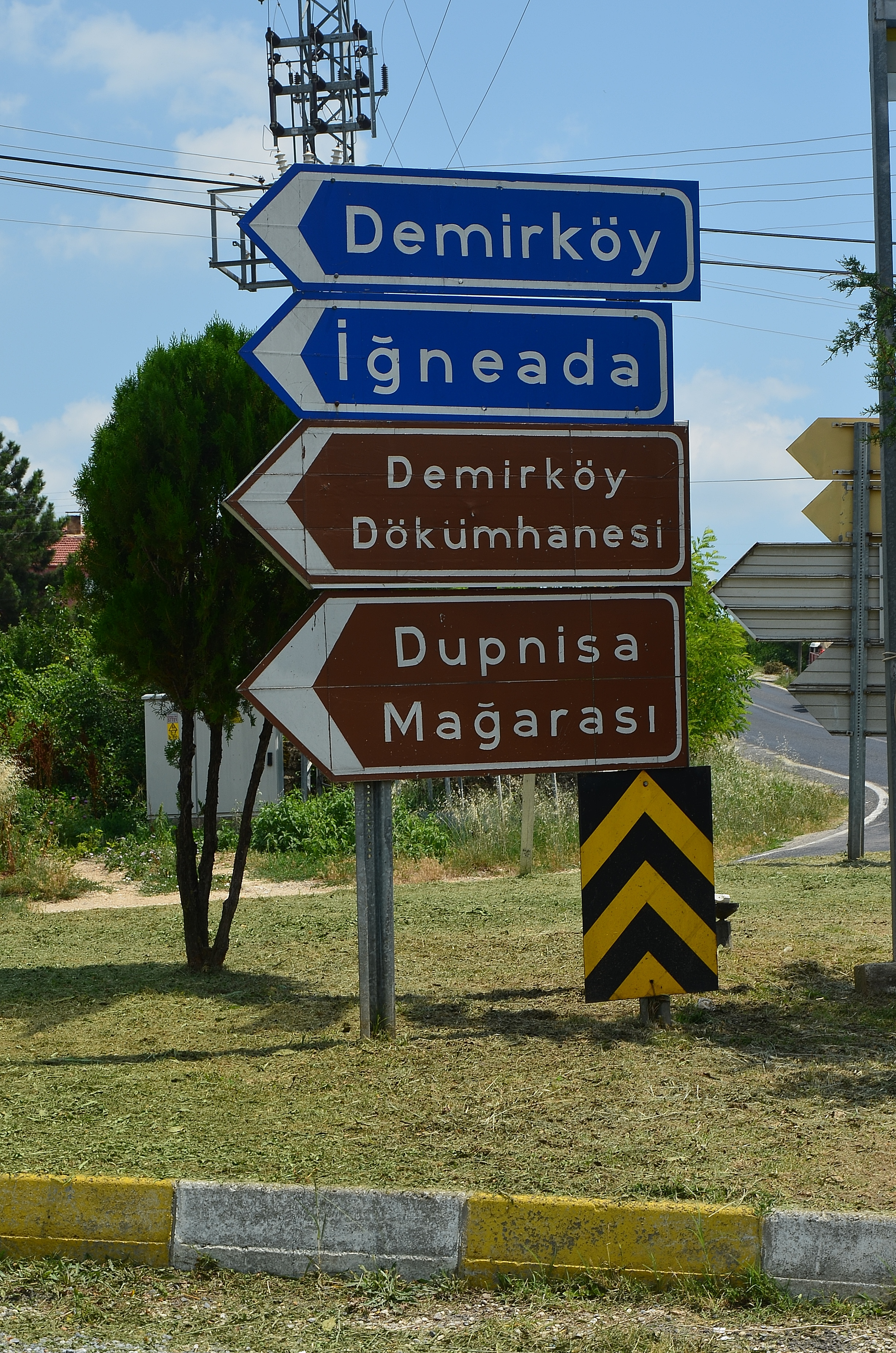
Directional road sign to Dupnisa Cave

The cave is situated deep in the forest, along the Strandzha Mountain Range, 5.5 km (3.4 mi) southwest of Sarpdere village and 25 km (16 mi) southwest of Demirköy in Kırklareli Province. It is located at a distance of 58 km (36 mi) from the provincial seat of Kırklareli, and 230 km (140 mi) from the city of Istanbul.

The Dupnisa Cave is accessible via the Kırklareli-Dereköy route (State Road D.555), from the Dereköy-Sarpdere or Kırklareli-Üsküp-Çukurpınar-Sarpdere routes from the north, and on the Vize-Poyralı D.020, Poyralı-Demirköy D.565 or the forementioned Demirköy-Sarpdere route from the south.

In 1913, Lyubomir Miletich recorded the existence of a Bulgarian-populated chiflik of 15-20 houses named Dunnitsa (Дунница). It was located just south of the modern day Bulgarian-Turkish border, most likely within the immediate vicinity of the cave. The chiflik's inhabitants were transported to Bulgaria after the Second Balkan War.

== Formation and geology ==
The cave was formed as a result of the marble formation's erosion during the Toarcian age of the Early Jurassic epoch, dating back to around 180 Ma. It consists of three interconnected caves and has three entrances, arranged into two separate floors. Each cave is different in hydrologic properties, stalactites and stalagmites. The total length of the Dupnisa Cave is 3,200 m (10,500 ft). Two caves, named "Kuru" ("Dry") and "Kız" ("Maiden"), are situated on the upper level running 2,720 m (8,920 ft), of which the lower cave, called "Sulu" ("Wet"), is located 60 m (200 ft) underneath. The "Kuru" is extremely rich in terms of stalactites, stalagmites, stalagnates and wall dripstones, reaching massive proportions. It is the source of the spring water flowing into Rezve Creek, the frontier between Turkey and Bulgaria. In contrast, the lower cave contains subterranean streams and lakes with draperies and boxworks over the lakes. The lower cave is at an elevation of 345 m (1,132 ft) AMSL. The cave's exit is 61 m (200 ft) higher than the entrance.

== Tourism ==
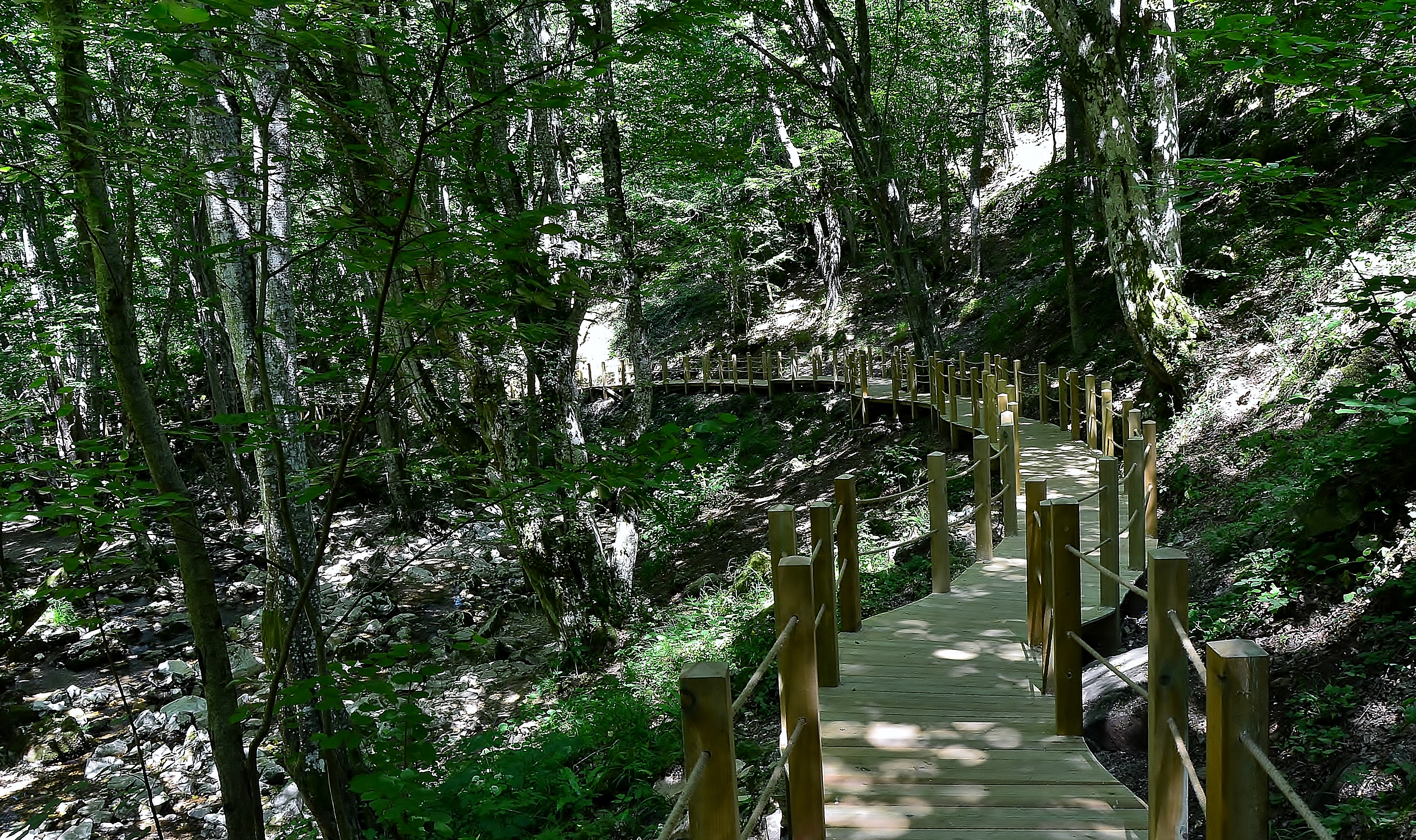
Walkway to the entrance of the cave

The total dissimilarity and variety of the caves make them an attractive tourist destination. The cave was opened to tourism in 2005, and it is the only show cave in East Thrace.

The upper cave, "Kız", is not open to the public due to the approximate 60,000 total bats of eleven different species dwelling on the walls and ceilings of the cave. Only 200 m (660 ft) of "Kuru" Cave and 250 m (820 ft) of "Sulu" Cave are open as part of the show cave. The "Kuru" cave is open year-round. The main entrance enters "Sulu" Cave, which is followed by a paved gallery complete with handrails. The passage to the area beyond 250 m (820 ft) is permitted only to experienced cavers for exploring purposes.

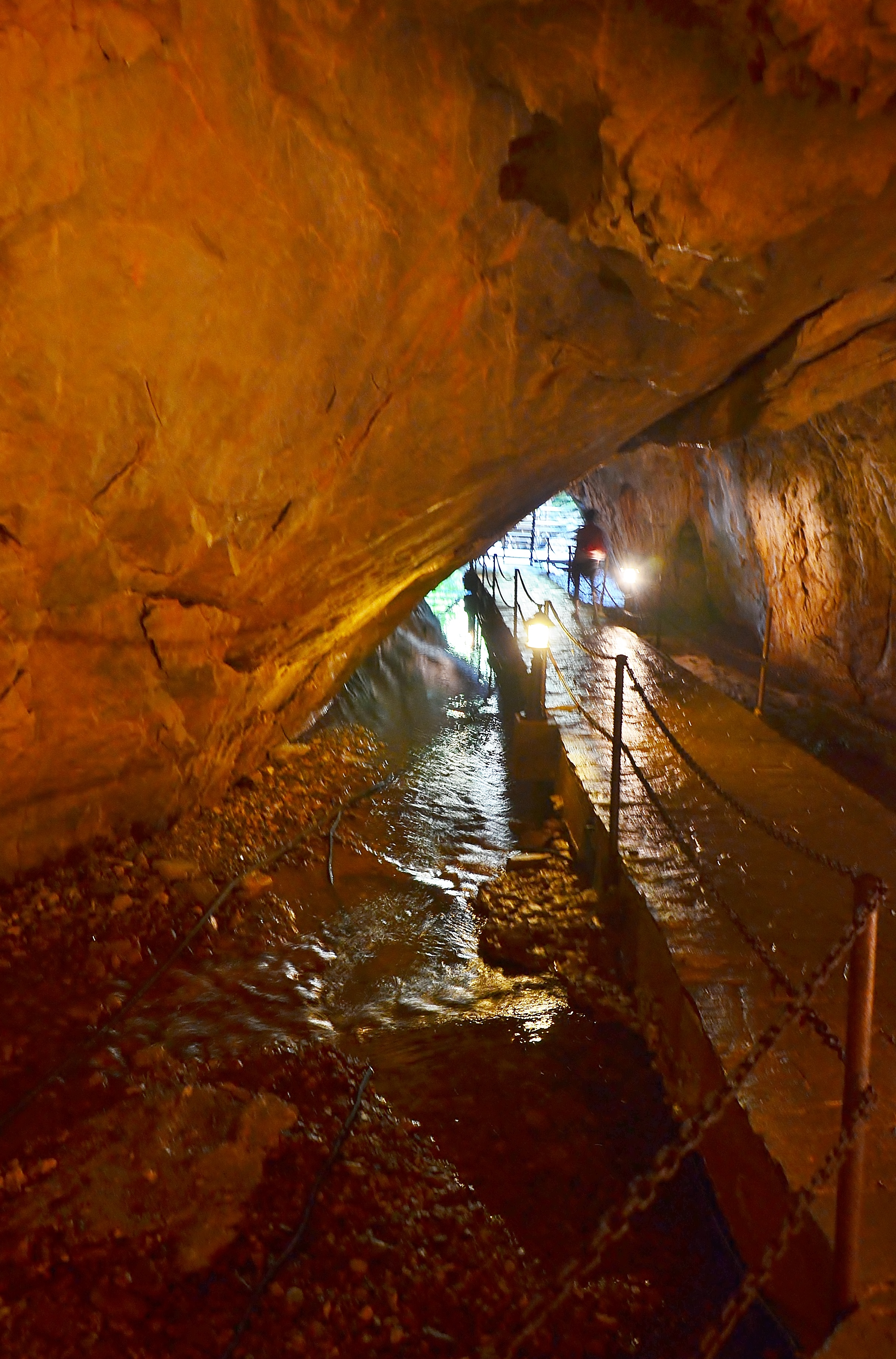
Cave entrance

At the end of the show cave in "Sulu", a staircase leads up to "Kuru" Cave. The main exit is at the end of the gallery at ground level. Return to the entry point is by a marked trail through the woods, which takes around 15 minutes to reach.

It was reported that the Dupnisa Cave was visited by over 17,000 domestic and foreign tourists within the first four months of 2012. The number of visitors reached 120,000 in 2013, according to the Deputy Director of Culture and Tourism in Kırklareli.

In response to the periodical abundance of bats, the cave is now closed from November 15 until May 15.
