= Bulgaria–Turkey border =

International border

Bulgaria-Turkey border
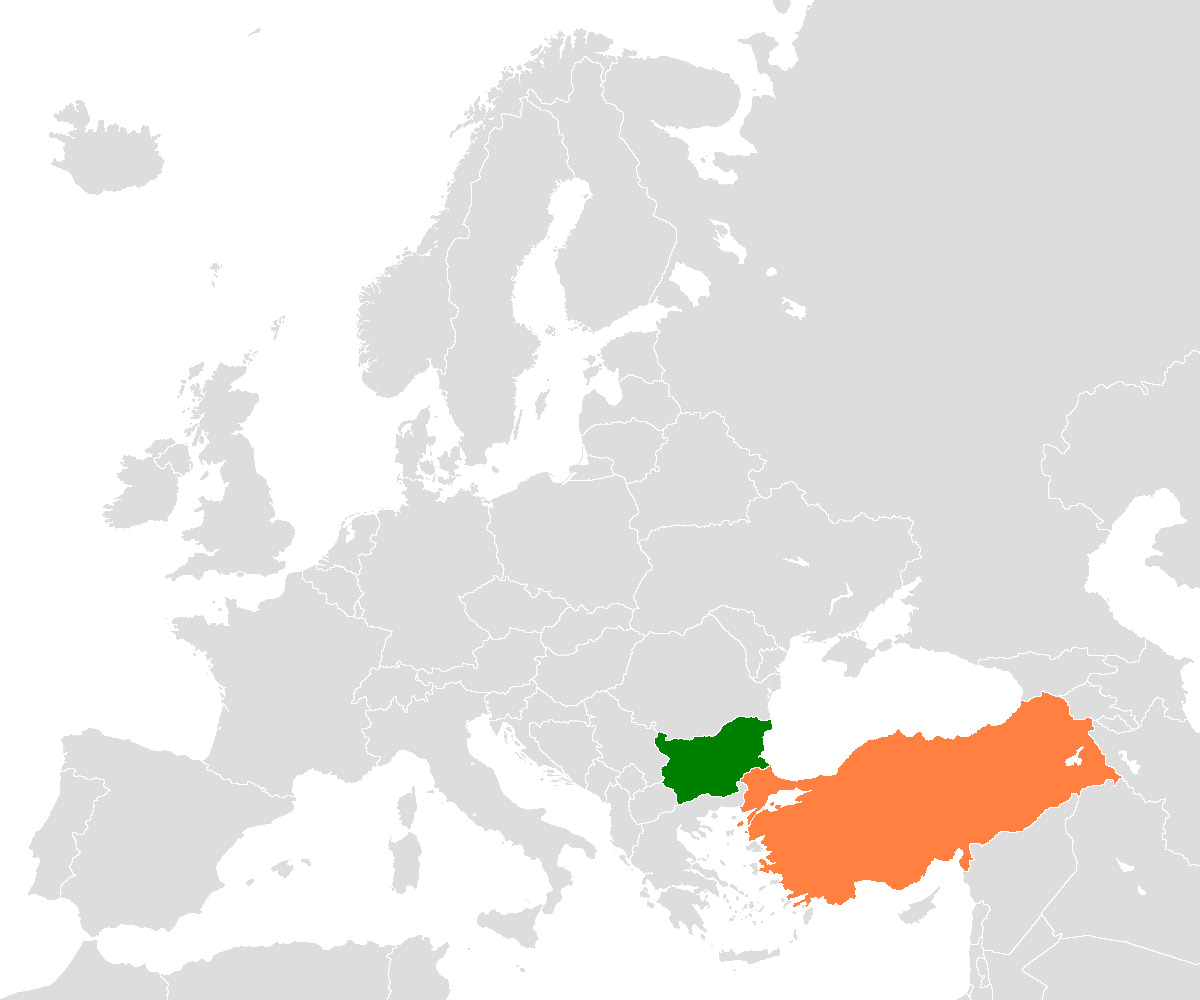

Characteristics
- Entities: Bulgaria Turkey
- Length: 259 km (161 mi)

History
- Established: 3 March 1878; Signing of the Treaty of San Stefano at the end of the Russo-Turkish War (1877–1878)
- Current shape: 6 August 1924; Signing of the Treaty of Lausanne at the end of the Turkish War of Independence
- Treaties: Treaty of San Stefano, Treaty of Berlin, Tophane Agreement, Treaty of London, Treaty of Constantinople, Treaty of Sèvres, Treaty of Lausanne

The Bulgaria–Turkey border (Bulgarian: Българо-турска граница, romanized: Būlgaro-turska granitsa,Turkish: Bulgaristan–Türkiye sınırı) is a 259 km (161 mi) long international border between the Republic of Bulgaria and the Republic of Turkey. It was established by the Treaty of San Stefano in 1878 as an inner border within the Ottoman Empire between Adrianople Vilayet and the autonomous province of Eastern Rumelia. The current borders are defined by the Treaty of Constantinople (1913) and the Bulgarian–Ottoman convention (1915). The border was reaffirmed by the Treaty of Lausanne ten years later, though Bulgaria was not a party to the latter treaty as it had earlier ceded to Greece that part of its border with Turkey which was modified by the Bulgarian-Ottoman convention.

The Bulgaria–Turkey border is an external border of the European Union and the Schengen Area.

== Border barrier ==
In response to the European migrant crisis, Bulgaria erected a border barrier to halt the influx of illegal crossings. As of June 2016, nearly 146 kilometres (91 mi) of the 166 kilometres (103 mi) planned barrier were constructed.

In January 2014, Bulgaria started construction of a 30 km (19 mi) long security fence along its border with Turkey to contain a surge of migrants from the Middle East and North Africa. Standing 10 ft (3.0 m) tall and fortified with razor wire coils, the fence covers the least visible section of the border between the Lesovo border checkpoint and the village of Golyam Dervent. The Bulgarian Army completed the protective barrier in July 2014 at a cost of around €5 million. As a result of the new fence, illegal crossing attempts in the vicinity of the installation have decreased by seven times. Turkey's ambassador to Bulgaria Suleyman Gokce has expressed dissatisfaction with the border barrier adding that it creates discontent and gives reason to "reflect on the political message" that the fence is sending.

At the beginning of 2015, the government announced a 130 km (81 mi) extension to the barbed wire border fence in order to completely secure the land border. Prime Minister Boyko Borisov described the extension as "absolutely necessary," in order to prevent persons from illegally entering the European Union member state. The Bulgarian Parliament has decided to continue construction of the fence at the border with Turkey without launching a public procurement procedure because of the need to safeguard national security. This final section of the fence completely seals off Bulgarian border with Turkey. As of March 2016, nearly 100 kilometres (62 mi) of the 166 kilometres (103 mi) planned barrier were constructed.Since August 2022, one Bulgarian Border Police officer and two Bulgarian police officers have been killed by migrants trying to illegally to cross the border.

== Crossings ==
There are three crossings along the entire border, two for vehicular traffic and one for vehicular and rail traffic. The busiest of three,Kapitan Andreevo - Kapıkule, is among the busiest border checkpoints in the world.

(Turkey) Turkish checkpoint	Province	(Bulgaria) Bulgarian checkpoint	Province	Opened	Route in Turkey	Route in Bulgaria	Status
Kapıkule	Edirne	Kapitan Andreevo	Haskovo	4 September 1953	D.100; Pehlivanköy–Svilengrad railway	A4; I-8; Pehlivanköy–Svilengrad railway	Open
Hamzabeyli	Edirne	Lesovo	Yambol	22 November 2004	D.535	I-7	Open
Dereköy	Kırklareli	Malko Tarnovo	Burgas	18 July 1969	D.555	I-9	Open
