= Otoyol 6 =

Highway in Turkey

O-6
- Kınalı-Balıkesir Otoyolu

Route information
- Part of E84 E90 E87
- Length: 321 km (199 mi)
- Existed: 2017–present

Major junctions
- North end: O-3 near Silivri
- South end: O-5 near Balıkesir

Location
- Country: Turkey
- Regions: Marmara
- Provinces: Istanbul, Tekirdağ, Çanakkale, Balıkesir
- Major cities: Tekirdağ, Gelibolu, Çanakkale, Balıkesir

Highway system
- Highways in Turkey; Motorways; List; State Highways; List
← O-5	→ O-7

Otoyol 6 (English: Motorway 6), named the Kınalı-Balıkesir Motorway (Turkish: Kınalı-Balıkesir Otoyolu) and abbreviated as O-6, is a planned 321-kilometre-long (199 mi) toll motorway in Turkey, with an 82-kilometre (51 mi) section between Malkara and Lapseki open to traffic. When complete, the route will begin at Kınalı, travel south to Çanakkale, cross the Dardanelles via the 1915 Çanakkale Bridge, and terminate at Balıkesir; connecting western Anatolia with East Thrace. The route is the first motorway in Turkey outside of Istanbul to connect the European and the Asian parts of the country.

== History ==
Construction started on 18 March 2017 in Çanakkale, on the 102nd anniversary of the Turkish naval victory during the Dardanelles Campaign of World War I. The Malkara-Lapseki section (~90 km), including the 1915 Çanakkale Bridge, was opened on 18 March 2022.

== Route ==
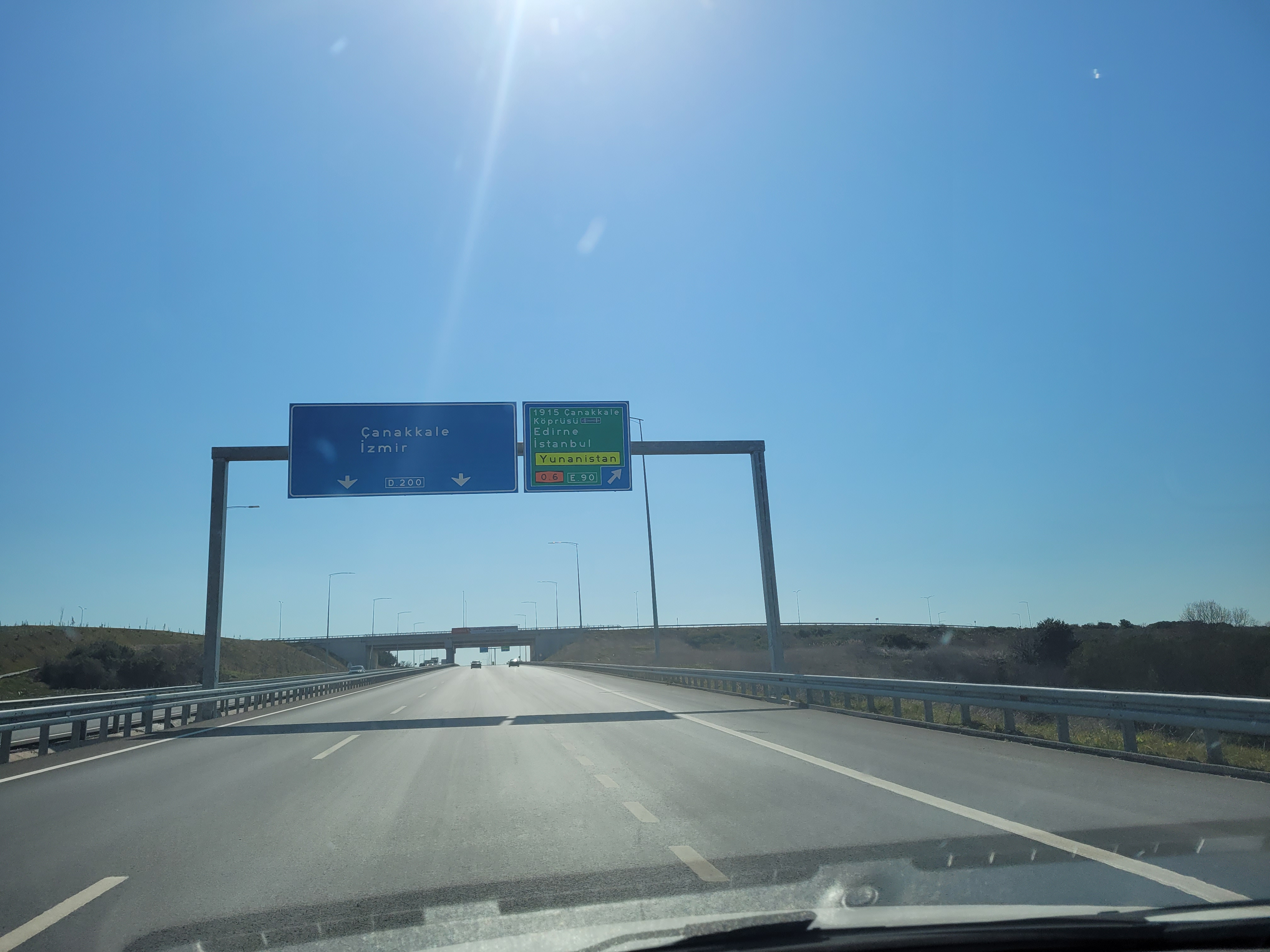
O-6 in Lapseki

District	km	Type	Destinations	Notes
Silivri	0		Kınalı O-3 Interchange	O-3 E80
Silivri	1,2		Silivri Prison Junction	
Silivri	3,0		Kınalı Junction	D.110 D.100
	4,4		V1 Viaduct	185 m
Silivri	13,0		Çantaköy Junction	D.100
	16,5		Motorway Service Area	200.000 m²
	18,3		V2 Viaduct	524 m
Marmaraereğlisi	22,0		Marmaraereğlisi Junction	D.567
Marmaraereğlisi	26,0		Çorlu Airport Junction	D.100
	30,5		Motorway Service Area	40.000 m²
Çorlu	40,0		Karatepe Junction	P.59-05
	41,5		Cut-Cover Tunnel 1	500 m
	43,7		V3 Viaduct	1216 m
	46,5		Motorway Service Area	55.000 m²
Tekirdağ	54,0		Tekirdağ East Junction	D.110
Tekirdağ	61,0		Tekirdağ Junction	D.565
	61,8		V4 Viaduct	371 m
Tekirdağ	67,0		Hayrabolu Junction	D.555
	69,5		Motorway Service Area	190.000 m²
Tekirdağ	74,0		Tekirdağ West Junction	D.110
	76,7		Cut-Cover Tunnel 2	500 m
	77,5		T1 Tunnel	1038 m
	91,2		V5 Viaduct	1084 m
	98,5		Motorway Service Area	50.000 m²
Malkara	108,0		Malkara Junction	D.110 E84
	113,0		Motorway Service Area	50.000 m²
	115,3		V6 Viaduct	1078 m
	140,0		Motorway Service Area	160.000 m²
Gelibolu	147,0		Bolayır Junction	D.550 E87 E90
	148,0		V7 Viaduct	183 m
Gelibolu	162,0		Gelibolu Junction	D.550
	168,3		V8 Viaduct	863 m
	175,0		Motorway Service Area	160.000 m²
Gelibolu	178,0		Gelibolu South Junction	D.550
	179,0		Çanakkale 1915 Bridge Pay Toll	
	180,4		Çanakkale 1915 Bridge West Approach Viaduct	
			Çanakkale 1915 Bridge	3.869 m
	185,0		Çanakkale 1915 Bridge East Approach Viaduct	
Lapseki	183,5		Lapseki Junction	D.200 E90
	187,4		V9 Viaduct	690 m
	188,5		Motorway Service Area	100.000 m²
Lapseki	190,0		Çanakkale Junction	D.200
	191,8		V10 Viaduct	1650 m
	201,3		T2 Tunnel	895 m
	202,5		V11 Viaduct	510 m /300 m (right)
	215,5		Motorway Service Area	
	220,7		T3 Tunnel	1830 m
	225,0		V12 Viaduct	330 m
Çan	241,0		Çan Junction	D.210
	242,5		Motorway Service Area	
	243,8		V13 Viaduct	360 m
	247,6		V14 Viaduct	360 m
	248,4		V15 Viaduct	390 m
	248,8		V16 Viaduct	300 m
	250,1		V17 Viaduct	360 m
	250,7		V18 Viaduct	390 m
	252,3		T4 Tunnel	990 m
Yenice	259,5		Yenice Junction	D.555
	267,0		T5 Tunnel	2045 m
	270,6		V19 Viaduct	330 m
	272,9		V20 Viaduct	300 m
	275,5		Motorway Service Area	
	284,4		V21 Viaduct	450 m
	284,9		V22 Viaduct	150 m
	285,1		V23 Viaduct	210 m
	285,8		V24 Viaduct	175 m
	286,5		V25 Viaduct	140 m
	286,8		V26 Viaduct	240 m
	296,9		V27 Viaduct	1300 m
	299,9		V28 Viaduct	1575 m
	303,8		V29 Viaduct	630 m
Balya	305,0		Balya Junction	D.555
	310,3		V30 Viaduct	105 m
	311,0		V31 Viaduct	960 m
	312,5		Motorway Service Area	
Balıkesir	321,0		Balıkesir Junction	O-5 E881
