= Otoyol 3 =

Highway in Turkey

O-3
- European Motorway; Avrupa Otoyolu

Route information
- Part of E80
- Part of AH1 and AH5
- Length: 231 km (144 mi)
- Existed: 1987–present

Major junctions
- West end: D.100 west Edirne

- O-7 in Kınalı K10, Silivri O-7 in Mahmutbey Batı K19, Başakşehir Küçükçekmece

- East end: O-2 in Mahmutbey Doğu K20 Bağcılar, Istanbul

Location
- Country: Turkey
- Regions: Marmara
- Provinces: Edirne, Kırklareli, Tekirdağ, Istanbul
- Major cities: Edirne, Istanbul

Highway system
- Highways in Turkey; Motorways; List; State Highways; List
← O-2	→ O-4

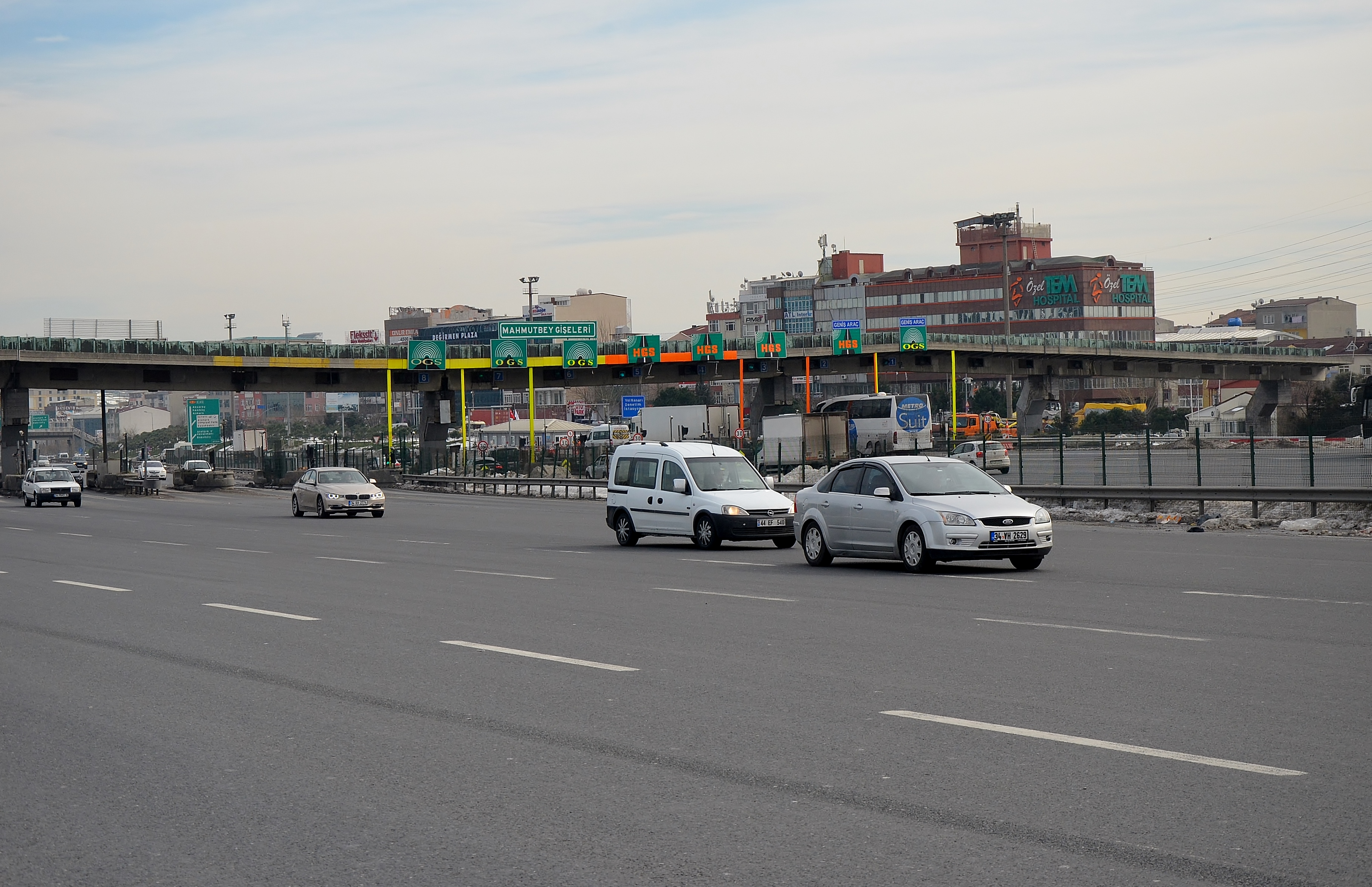
Mahmutbey Toll Plaza on the O-3

Otoyol 3 (English: Motorway 3), also known as the European Motorway (Turkish: Avrupa Otoyolu) and abbreviated as the O-3 is a 245.1 km (152.3 mi) long otoyol in East Thrace, Turkey. The O-3 runs from Edirne to Istanbul and is the only motorway in Turkey located entirely in Europe. The motorway begins west of Edirne at "Edirne Batı K1" junction with the D.100 where it then continues as a beltway passing just north of Edirne. From there, the motorway passes through mostly rural farmland until it enters the Istanbul metropolis near Silivri. The eastern end of O-3 ends at the Istanbul Bağcılar "Mahmutbey Batı K20" Junction.

O-3 "Avrupa otoyolu" "Mahmutbey Batı K19" junction connects to O-7, E80, Istanbul Airport and Yavuz Sultan Selim Bridge in the north direction, to Ataturk Airport with the 2nd Beltway in the south direction. The last junction of the European motorway "Mahmutbey Doğu K20" connects to O-2 motorway (2nd Beltway) and Fatih Sultan Mehmet Bridge in the east direction, to 1st Beltway (O-1) with the O3-O1 connection road in the south direction. The motorway has six lanes, three in each direction, except for a 44.6 km (27.7 mi) section between Silivri and Esenyurt.

== Exit list ==
Province	District	km	mi	Exit	Destination	Notes
Edirne	Edirne Merkez	0	0	K1	D.100 connector Edirne Batı junction	E80 route
Edirne	Edirne Merkez	11.5	7.1	K2	D.535 connector Lalapaşa junction	E80 route
Edirne	Edirne Merkez	15.8	9.8	K3	D.100 connector Edirne Doğu junction	E80 route
Edirne	Edirne Merkez	16.7	10.3	Edirne Toll Plaza		
Edirne	Havsa	35.7	22.1	K4	D.020 connector Havsa junction	E80 route
Kırklareli	Babaeski	62.9	39	K5	D.555 connector Babaeski junction	E80 route
Kırklareli	Lüleburgaz	87.3	54.2	K6	D.565 connector Lüleburgaz junction	E80 route
Tekirdağ	Saray	116.1	72.1	K7	P.59-01 — Vakıflar, connector Saray junction	E80 route
Tekirdağ	Çorlu	136.3	84.6	K8	P.59-04 —Velimeşe connector Çorlu junction	E80 route
Istanbul	Silivri	154.8	96.1	K9	D.567 connector Çerkezköy junction	E80 route
Istanbul	Silivri	167.1	103.8	K10	Northbound O-7- E80—Kınalı junction Southbound E84	connector to D.100 and D.110
Istanbul	Silivri	174.3	108.3	K11	Silivri D100 connector—Silivri junction	
Istanbul	Silivri	186.1	115.6	K12	Ortaköy connector — Selimpaşa junction	
Istanbul	Büyükçekmece	193.6	120.2	K13	Kumburgaz connector — Kumburgaz junction	
Istanbul	Büyükçekmece	199.6	124	K14	D.569 — Çatalca junction	
Istanbul	Esenyurt	211.7	131.5	K15	P.34-84 — Hadımköy junction	
Istanbul	Esenyurt	216.6	134.3	K16	Esenyurt connector — Esenyurt junction	
Istanbul	Avcılar	217.7	135.0	K17	Avcılar-H.dere connector — Avcılar junction	
Istanbul	Avcılar	220.2	136.2	K18	Nakkaş-Başakşehir connector — Isparta Kule junction	
Istanbul	Başakşehir Küçükçekmece	228.0	141.3		Mahmutbey Toll Plaza	
Istanbul	Başakşehir Küçükçekmece	229.1	142.0	K19	Northbound O-7 and E80 route, Southbound Bakırköy connector Mahmutbey Doğu junction	connector to the YSS Bridge and E80 route
Istanbul	Bağcılar	231.8	146.4	K20	east end of O-3 Mahmutbey Batı junction	connector to the O-2(istanbul second Bltwy) and Fatih Sultan Mehmet Bridge
1.000 mi = 1.609 km; 1.000 km = 0.621 mi: Incomplete access; Tolled

== See also ==
- List of motorways in Turkey
