= Land border crossings of Turkey =

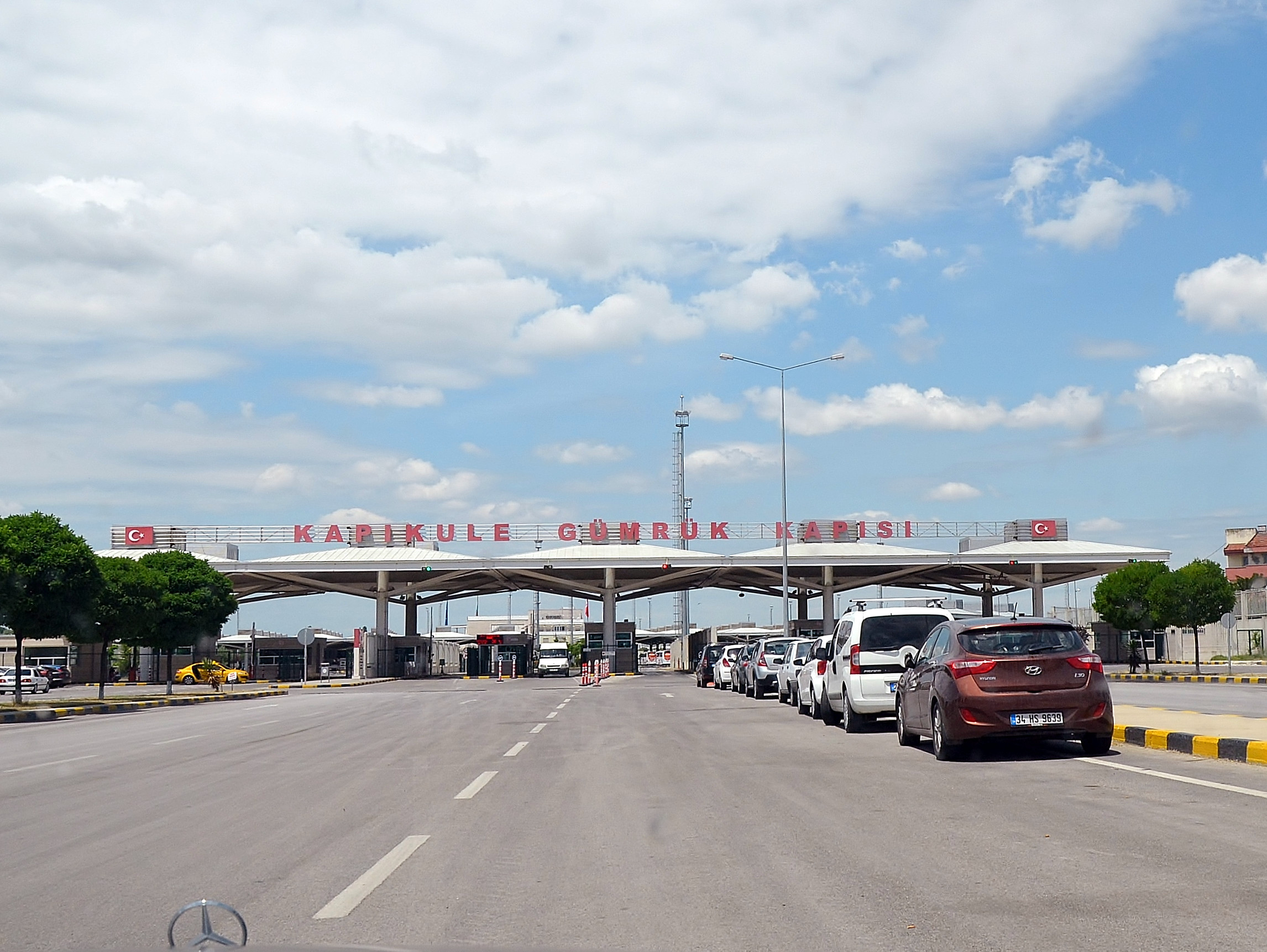
Kapıkule-Kapitan Andreevo border crossing

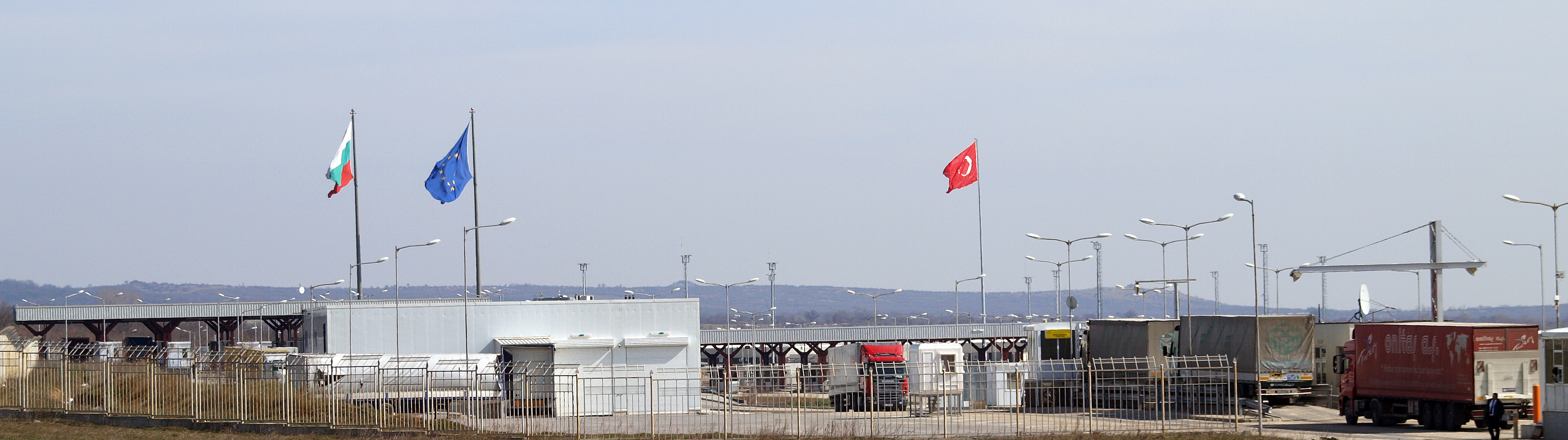
Hamzabeyli-Lesovo border crossing

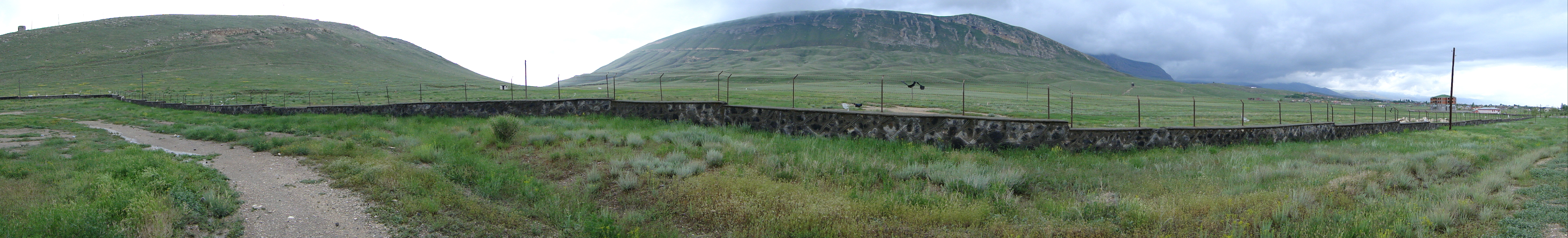
Turkish-Iranian frontier at Gürbulak

The following is a list of land border crossings of Turkey (i.e. only for motor vehicles, not railways) as of 2013.

#	In province	Name of the crossing point	Open/Closed since	To country	Counterpart	To road	Status
1	Ağrı	Gürbulak	04.09.1953	Iran	Bazargan		Open
2	Van	Kapıköy	16.04.2011	Iran	Razi		Open
3	Hakkâri	Esendere	15.09.1964	Iran	Serow		Open
4	Ardahan	Posof-Türkgözü	12.07.1995	Georgia	Vale	E691/	Open
5	Ardahan	Çıldır-Aktaş	24.07.1995	Georgia	Kartsakhi	E691/	Open
6	Artvin	Sarp	31.08.1988	Georgia	Sarpi	E70/	Open
7	Edirne	Pazarkule	20.04.1952	Greece	Kastanies	/51	Open
8	Edirne	İpsala	10.07.1961	Greece	Kipoi	E90/	Open
9	Edirne	Kapıkule	04.09.1953	Bulgaria	Kapitan Andreevo	E80	Open
10	Edirne	Hamzabeyli	22.11.2004	Bulgaria	Lesovo	7	Open
11	Gaziantep	Karkamış	04.09.1953	Syria	Jarabulus	216	Open only to Syrian and Turkish passport holders, between 07:00-19:00
12	Hakkari	Şemdinli-Derecik	14.02.2011	Iraq	?	?	Open
13	Hakkari	Çukurca-Üzümlü	07.05.2015	Iraq	?	?	Open only to Iraq and Turkey passport holders only; open 8 am - 5 pm Sunday through Thursday
14	Hatay	Yayladağı	04.09.1953	Syria	Kesab	1	Open only to Syrian and Turkish passport holders, between 07:00-19:00
15	Hatay	Cilvegözü	04.09.1953	Syria	Bab al-Hawa	M45	Open only to Syrian and Turkish passport holders, 24/7
16	Hatay	Zeytin Dalı	01.03.2026	Syria	Hamam, Syria		Closed
17	Iğdır	Dilucu	20.05.1992	Azerbaijan -Nakhchivan	Sederek	E99/ M7	Open
18	Kilis	Öncüpınar	04.09.1953	Syria	Azaz	Route 214/Route 217	Open only to Syrian and Turkish passport holders, 24/7
19	Kilis	Çobanbey	07.07.2025	Syria	Al-Rai	Elbeyli Road	Open only to Syrian and Turkish passport holders, between 07:00-19:00
20	Kırklareli	Dereköy	18.07.1969	Bulgaria	Malko Tarnovo	E87/9	Open
21	Mardin	Nusaybin	04.09.1953	Syria	Qamishli	M4	Open
22	Mardin	Şenyurt	04.09.1953	Syria	Al-Darbasiyah	No road	Closed
23	Şanlıurfa	Akçakale	16.10.1974	Syria	Tell Abyad	Route 712	Open only to Syrian and Turkish passport holders
24	Şanlıurfa	Ceylanpınar	26.03.1999	Syria	Ras al-Ayn	?	Closed
25	Şanlıurfa	Mürşitpınar	08.09.2010	Syria	Ayn al-Arab	?	Closed (Open only on Eids)
26	Şırnak	Habur	18.07.1969	Iraq	Zakho		Open
27	Şırnak	Gülyazı	24.01.2012	Iraq	?	?	Closed
28	Kars	Akyaka	04.09.1953-11.07.1993	Armenia	Gyumri	M7	Closed
29	Iğdır	Alican	1993	Armenia	Margara	M7	Closed
30	Iğdır	Borualan	01.01.1985	Iran	?	M7	Closed

== See also ==
- Railway border crossings of Turkey
- Ministry of Industry and Trade, 2012 Annual Report
