= State road D.565 (Turkey) =

Highway in Turkey

D.565

Route information
- Part of E881
- Length: 407 km (253 mi)

Major junctions
- North end: İğneada, Kırklareli
- South end: Bornova, İzmir

Location
- Country: Turkey

Highway system
- Highways in Turkey; Motorways; List; State Highways; List

D.565 is a 407 km (253 mi) long north–south state road from İğneada on the Black Sea to İzmir in western Turkey. The route is broken into two parts by the Sea of Marmara: a 128 km (80 mi) long section in East Thrace from İğneada to Tekirdağ and a 279 km (173 mi) section in Anatolia from Bandırma to İzmir. The gap is connected by a car ferry operating between the two port cities. The route is mostly a four-lane highway except for the first 61 km (38 mi) section at its northern end.

In two separate sections, the D.565 runs concurrently with two other state roads in East Thrace: with the D.020 between Poyralı and Pınarhisar and with the D.100 between Lüleburgaz and Büyükkarıştıran.

== Main intersections ==
=== East Thrace ===
Province	District	km	mi	Destination	Notes
Kırklareli	Demirköy	0.0	0.0	P.39-01 (İğneada Rd.) — Limanköy	
Kırklareli	Pınarhisar	61		D.020 — Istanbul	Eastern end of concurrency with D.020
Kırklareli	Pınarhisar	73		D.020 — Edirne	Western end of concurrency with D.020
Kırklareli	Lüleburgaz	96		O-3 — Edirne, Istanbul	Toll entrance/exit
Kırklareli	Lüleburgaz	102		D.100 — Kapıkule	Western end of concurrency with D.100
Kırklareli	Lüleburgaz	120		D.100 — Istanbul	Eastern end of concurrency with D.100
Tekirdağ	Muratlı	132		P.59-77 — Çeneköy	
Tekirdağ	Tekirdağ	153		D.110 — Silivri, İpsala	

=== Anatolia ===
Province	District	km	mi	Destination	Notes
Balıkesir	Bandırma	0.0	0.0	Port of Bandırma	Carferry crosses the Sea of Marmara to D.565 in East Thrace.
Balıkesir	Bandırma			D.200 — Çanakkale	Northern end of concurrency with D.200
Balıkesir	Bandırma			Atatürk Cd.	
Balıkesir	Bandırma			D.200 — Bursa	Southern end of concurrency with D.200
Balıkesir	Bandırma			P.10-03 — Manyas	
Balıkesir	Susurluk			D.573 — Karacabey	
Balıkesir	Susurluk			O-5 — Gebze, İzmir	Under construction (2019)
Balıkesir	Balıkesir			O-5 — Gebze, İzmir	Toll entrance/exit
Balıkesir	Balıkesir			P.10-75 — Şamlı	
Balıkesir	Balıkesir			D.230 — Edremit, Kütahya	Northern end of the Balıkesir Beltway, cloverleaf interchange
Balıkesir	Balıkesir			D.555 — Sındırgı	Southern end of the Balıkesir Beltway, cloverleaf interchange
Balıkesir	Balıkesir			P.10-51 — Savaştepe	
Balıkesir	Balıkesir			P.10-31 — Sındırgı	
Manisa	Kırkağaç	0.0	0.0	P.45-05 — Kırkağaç	
Manisa	Kırkağaç			P.05-13 — Bakır	
Manisa	Akhisar			P.45-12 — Sındırgı	
Manisa	Akhisar			D.240 — Bergama	
Manisa	Akhisar			P.45-06 — Palamut	
Manisa	Akhisar			D.555 — Salihli	
Manisa	Saruhanlı			O-5 — Gebze, İzmir	Toll entrance/exit
Manisa	Saruhanlı			P.45-03 — Hacıveliler	
Manisa	Manisa			D.250 — Turgutlu	
Manisa	Manisa			Mimar Sinan Blv. — Manisa	Northern end of the Manisa Beltway
Manisa	Manisa			D.250 — Menemen	
Manisa	Manisa			Mimar Sinan Blv. — Manisa	Southern end of the Manisa Beltway
İzmir	Bornova	0.0	0.0	D.300 — Çeşme, Afyon	Half Y-interchange
