= Kavaklı, Kırklareli =

Kavaklı
- Municipality
- Location in Turkey Kavaklı (Marmara)
- Coordinates: 41°39′N 27°10′E
- Country: Turkey
- Province: Kırklareli
- District: Kırklareli
- Elevation: 170 m (560 ft)
- Population (2022): 4,682
- Time zone: UTC+3 (TRT)
- Postal code: 39160
- Area code: 0288

Kavaklı is a town (belde) in the Kırklareli District, Kırklareli Province, Turkey. Its population is 4,682 (2022). It is situated on the state road D.555 which connects Kırklareli to Istanbul. Prior to the Balkan Wars, the population of Kavaklı was composed of Greeks and Bulgarians living in the Ottoman Empire. After the Balkan Wars, Bulgarians left for Kavakli in Bulgaria, the Greeks were scattered throughout Greece, and the Turks from Bulgaria settled in Kavakli. Later, Turks from Greece and Serbia also settled in Kavaklı. In 1968, Kavaklı was declared a township seat. Both agriculture and industry play a part in the town's economy.
