= 1915 Çanakkale Bridge =

Suspension bridge across the Dardanelles in Turkey

1915 Çanakkale Bridge Dardanelles Bridge 1915 Çanakkale Köprüsü Çanakkale Boğaz Köprüsü
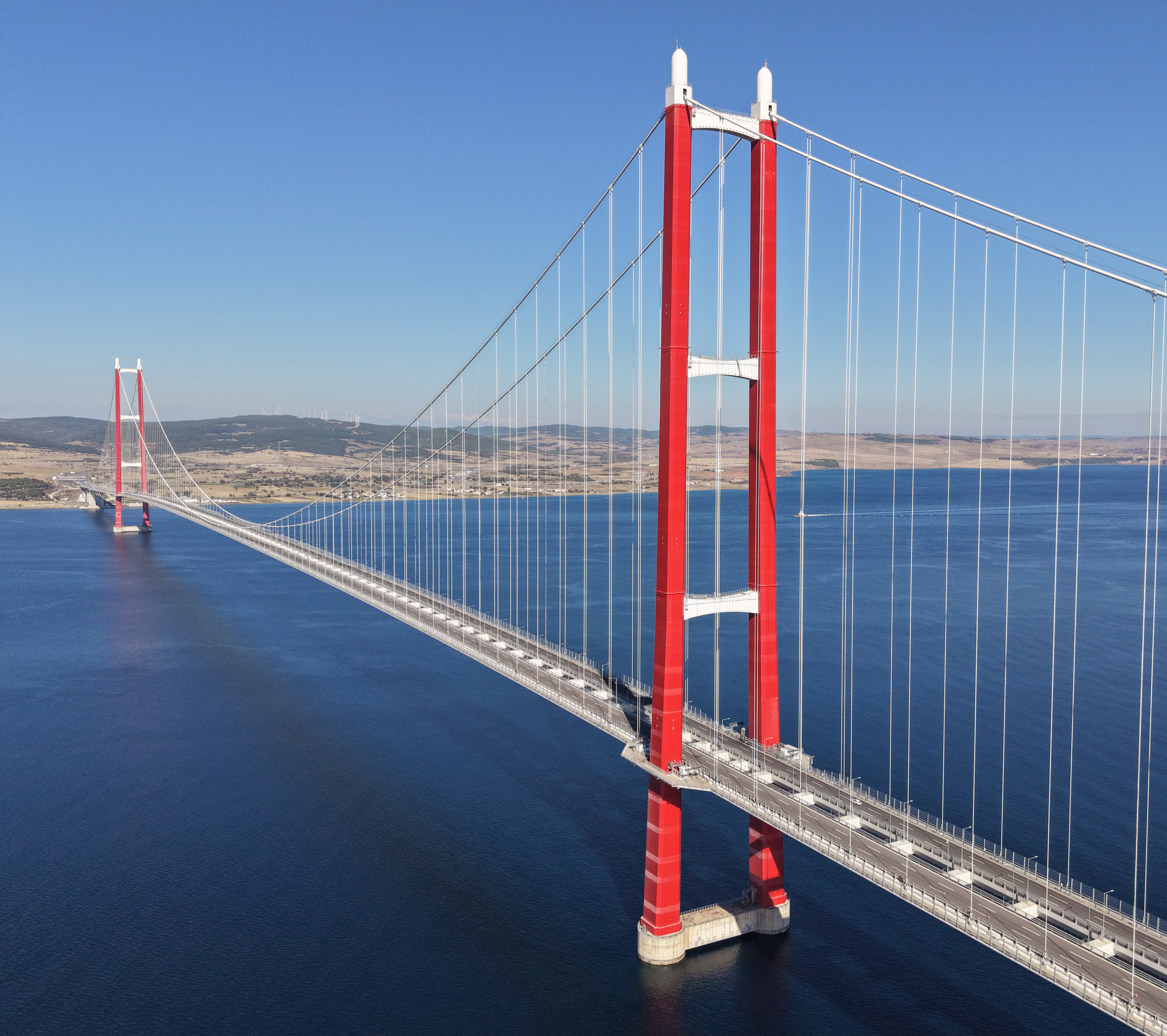
- Çanakkale bridge in September 2025
- Coordinates: 40°20′24″N 26°38′10″E
- Carries: 6 lanes of O-6; Maintenance walkways on each side
- Crosses: Dardanelles
- Locale: Çanakkale Province, Turkey
- Official name: 1915 Çanakkale Köprüsü
- Website: 1915canakkale.com/en-us

Characteristics
- Design: Suspension
- Total length: 4,608 m (15,118 ft)
- Width: 45.06 m (148 ft)
- Height: 334 m (1,096 ft)
- Longest span: 2,023 m (6,637 ft)
- Clearance below: 70 m (230 ft)

History
- Designer: COWI A/S and PEC (Pyunghwa Engineering Consultants)
- Constructed by: Daelim, Limak, SK, Yapı Merkezi
- Construction start: March 2017
- Construction end: 26 February 2022
- Opened: 18 March 2022; 4 years ago

Statistics
- Toll: ₺1,170

Location
- Interactive map of 1915 Çanakkale Bridge; Dardanelles Bridge

The 1915 Çanakkale Bridge (Turkish: 1915 Çanakkale Köprüsü) is a road suspension bridge in the province of Çanakkale in northwestern Turkey, first opened on 18 March 2022. Situated just southwest of the coastal towns of Lapseki and Gelibolu, the bridge spans the Dardanelles, about ten kilometres (six miles) west of the Sea of Marmara. The bridge is the longest suspension bridge in the world; with a main span of 2,023 metres (2.023 kilometres; 1.257 miles), the bridge surpasses the Akashi Kaikyo Bridge (1998) in Japan by 32 metres (105 feet).

The bridge was officially opened by President Recep Tayyip Erdoğan in 2022 after roughly five years of construction. It is the centrepiece of the planned 321-kilometre-long (199 mi) US$2.8 billion O-6 motorway, which will connect the O-3 and O-7 motorways in East Thrace with the O-5 motorway in Anatolia. The year "1915" in the official Turkish name honours an important Ottoman victory in the Gallipoli campaign comprising an unsuccessful Entente naval attack followed by invasions of the Gallipoli peninsula by the forces of Australia, New Zealand, France, and Great Britain, on 25 April 1915 and a second in August; the Entente land forces failed to make significant progress and were evacuated at the end of that year.

The bridge is the first fixed crossing over the Dardanelles and the sixth one across the Turkish Straits, after three bridges over the Bosphorus and two tunnels under it.

== Design and cost ==
The bridge's tender project was designed by Turkey-based Tekfen Construction and Installation and detailed designed by Denmark-headquartered COWI A/S and by Pyunghwa Engineering Consultants (PEC) in South Korea (for cable design and approach bridge design packages only). UK-headquartered Arup Group and Norway-based Aas-Jakobsen conducted independent design verification. The Administrator consultants are Tekfen and Switzerland-based T-ingénierie.

The total length of the bridge is 3,563 metres (11,690 ft) and together with the approach viaducts the length reaches 4,608 metres (15,118 ft), which surpasses the total length of the Osman Gazi Bridge and its approach viaducts by 527 metres (1,729 ft), to become the longest bridge of any type in Turkey.

The height of the bridge's two towers is 334 metres (1,096 ft), (Note: 318 m is elevation of IP (Intersection Point) of main cable which is important for design, actual tower height considering tower top enclosure is 334 m.) making it the tallest bridge in Turkey, surpassing Yavuz Sultan Selim Bridge, and the third tallest structure in the country. Internationally, the bridge is the fifth tallest bridge in the world. The deck of the bridge is 72.8 metres (239 ft) high and 45.06 metres (147.8 ft) wide, with a maximum thickness of 3.5 metres (11 ft). The deck carries six lanes of motorway (three in each direction), together with a walkway on each side for maintenance.

According to President Erdoğan, the bridge cost 2.5 billion euros (2.7 billion US dollars) to build, but would save €415 million ($458 million) per year from a reduction of fuel consumption and carbon emissions.

== History ==
Proposals for a bridge spanning the Dardanelles Strait have existed since the 1990s. A bridge was proposed again in 2012 and went on to be placed in the Turkish government's future transportation projects list in 2014. In September 2016, the government officially launched the bridge building project. Bids for the contract to construct the bridge were made in 2017.

The contract was awarded to a consortium containing Turkish companies Limak Holding and Yapı Merkezi and South Korean companies DL Holdings and SK Ecoplant. Construction began in March 2017. The bridge was initially scheduled for completion in September 2023, and later brought forward to March 2022.

On 16 May 2020, the second tower was completed, on the Gallipoli side (European coast). By 13 November 2021, all block decks were installed. The toll bridge opened for traffic on 18 March 2022 with a toll price of 200 lira (€6.78) for passenger cars. This was later increased to 790 lira and since 1 July 2026, the toll has been 1,170 lira.

== Symbolism ==
Some symbolic figures are associated with the bridge:

- the number 1915 in the name,
- the height of intersection point of main cable (318 m),
- and the opening date (18 March),

are all related to the date of the Ottoman naval victory, on 18 March 1915, during the naval operations in the Gallipoli campaign. Meanwhile, the length of the bridge's main span (2,023 metres) refers to the centennial of the Turkish Republic (1923–2023).

== Gallery ==
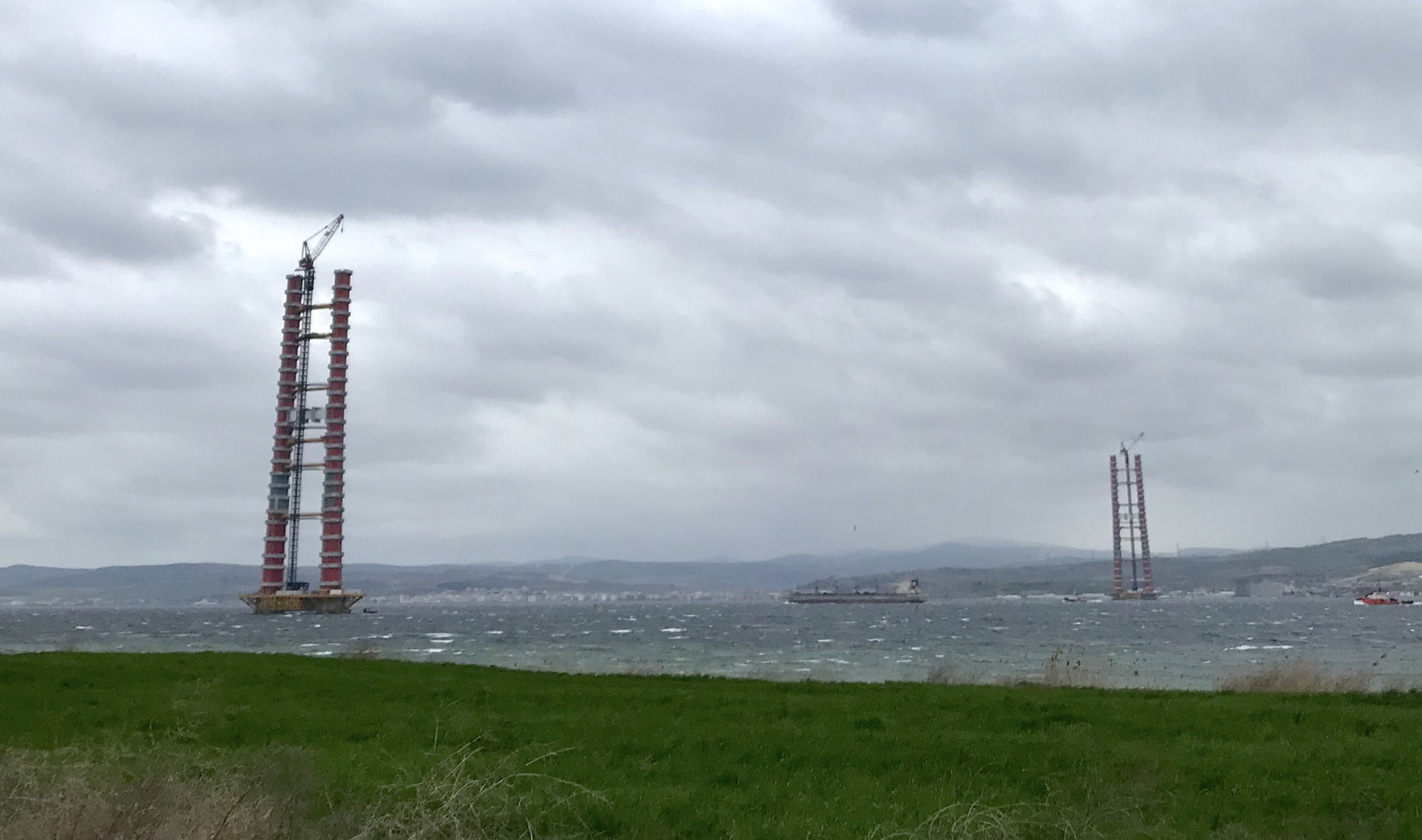
Western tower, March 2020

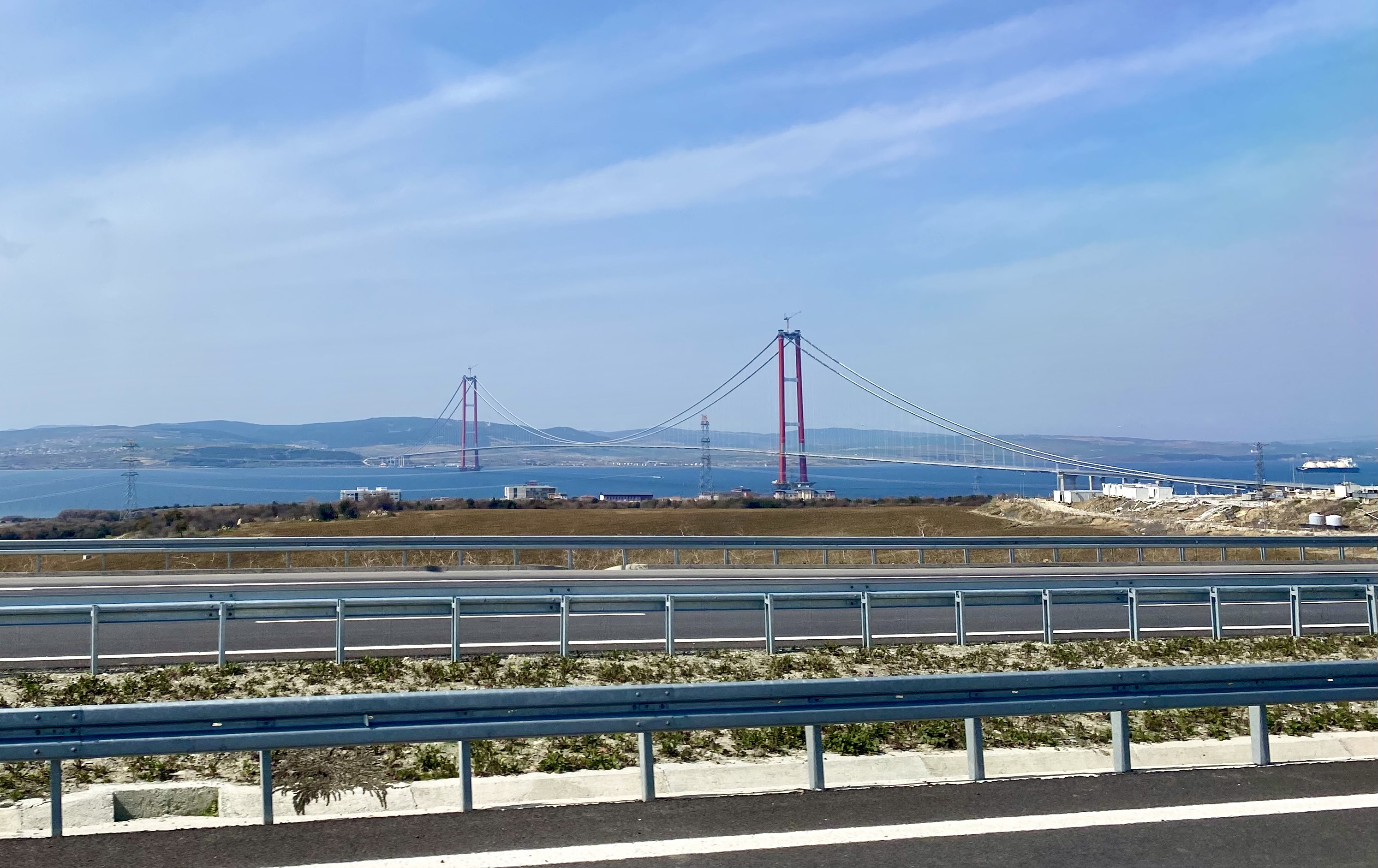
The bridge near completion

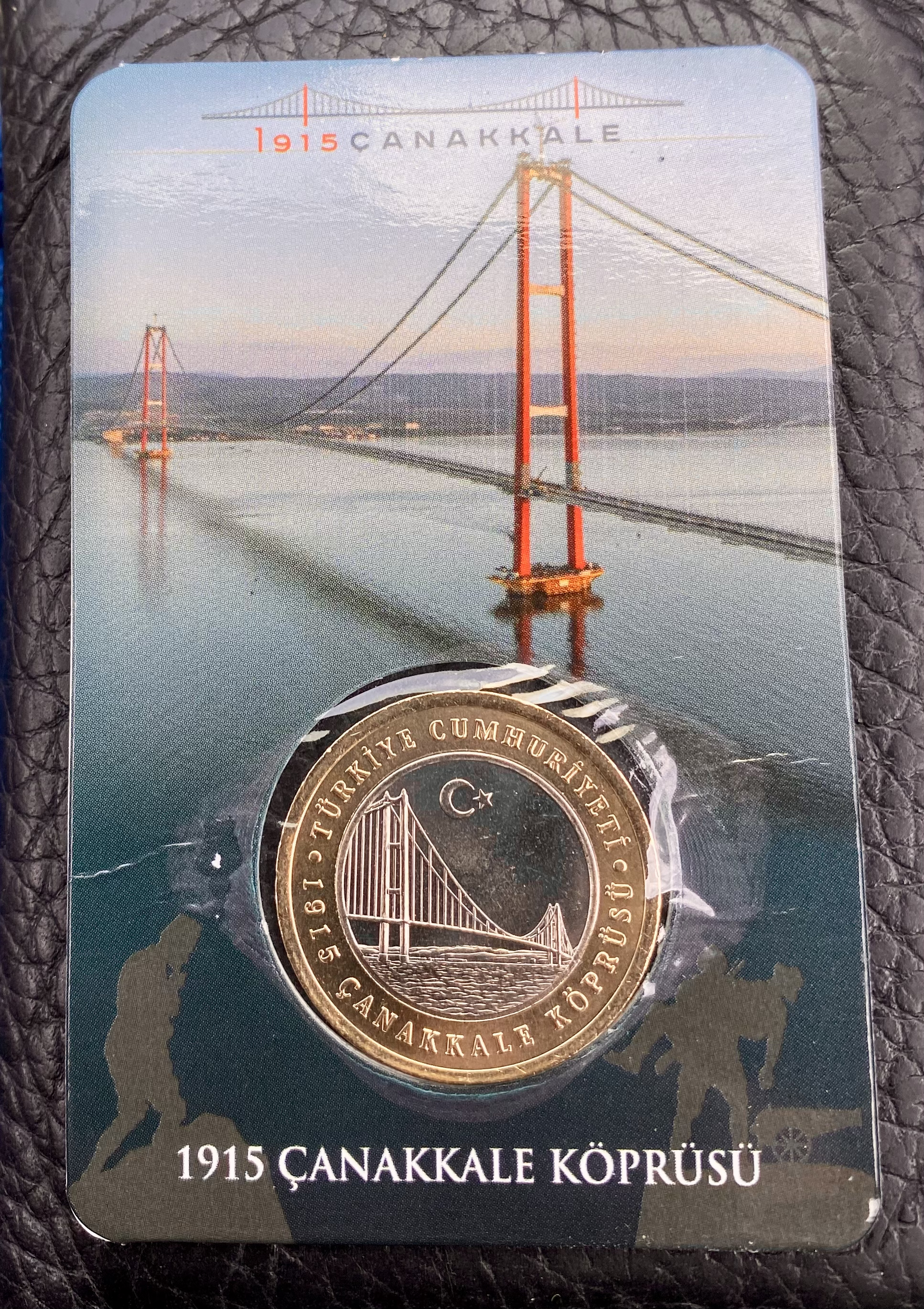
1915 Çanakkale Bridge Commemorative Coin

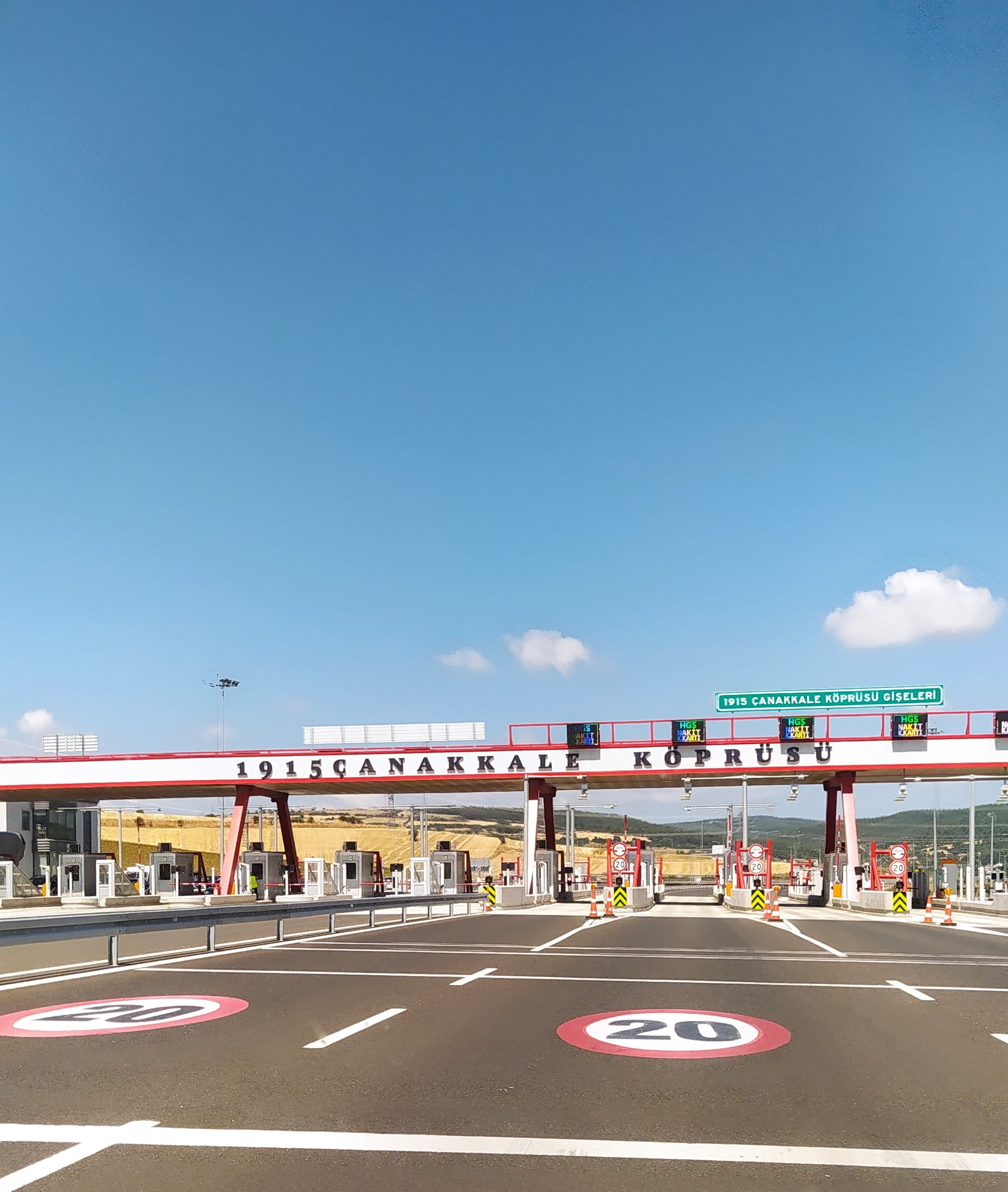
Lapseki toll booths of the bridge

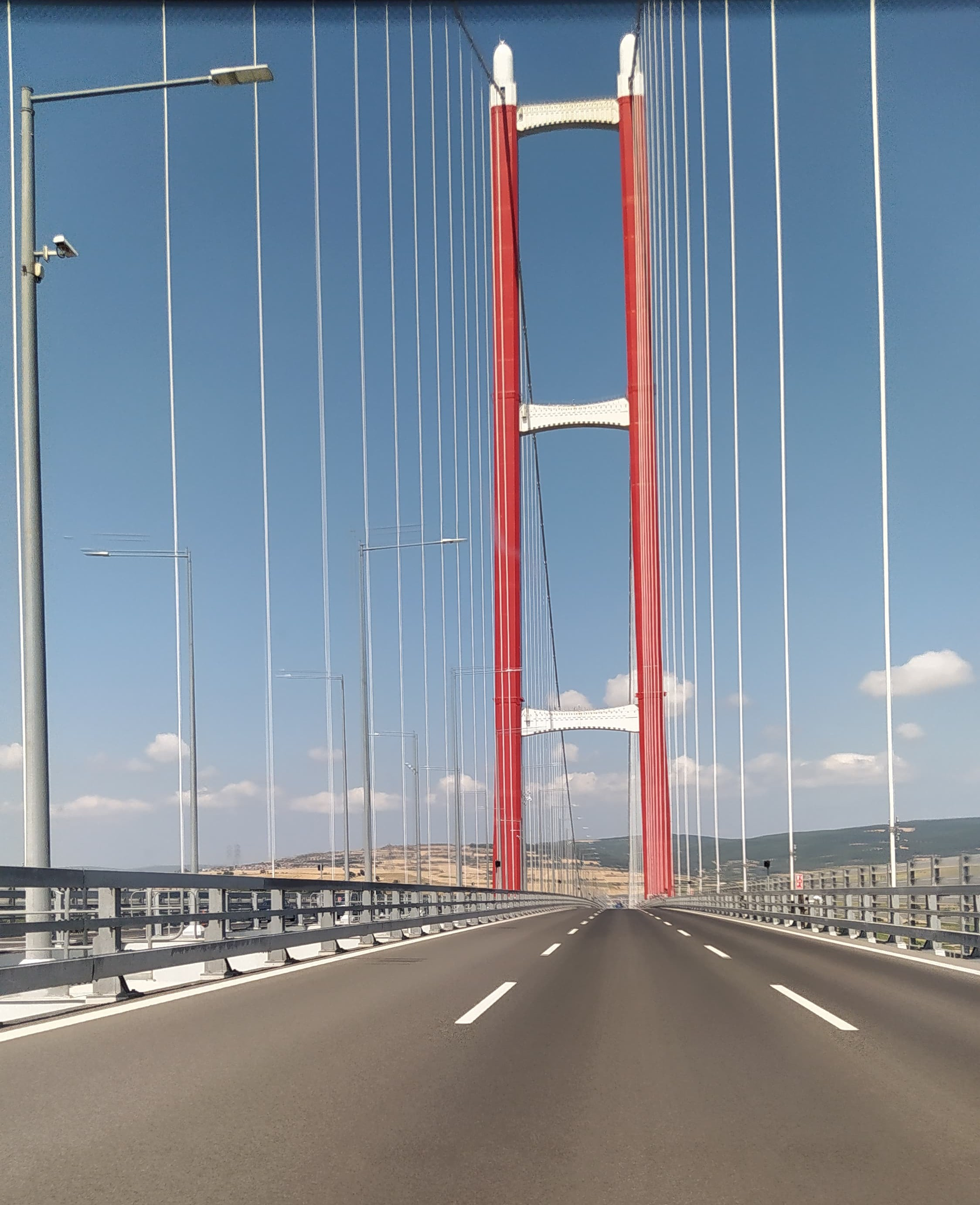

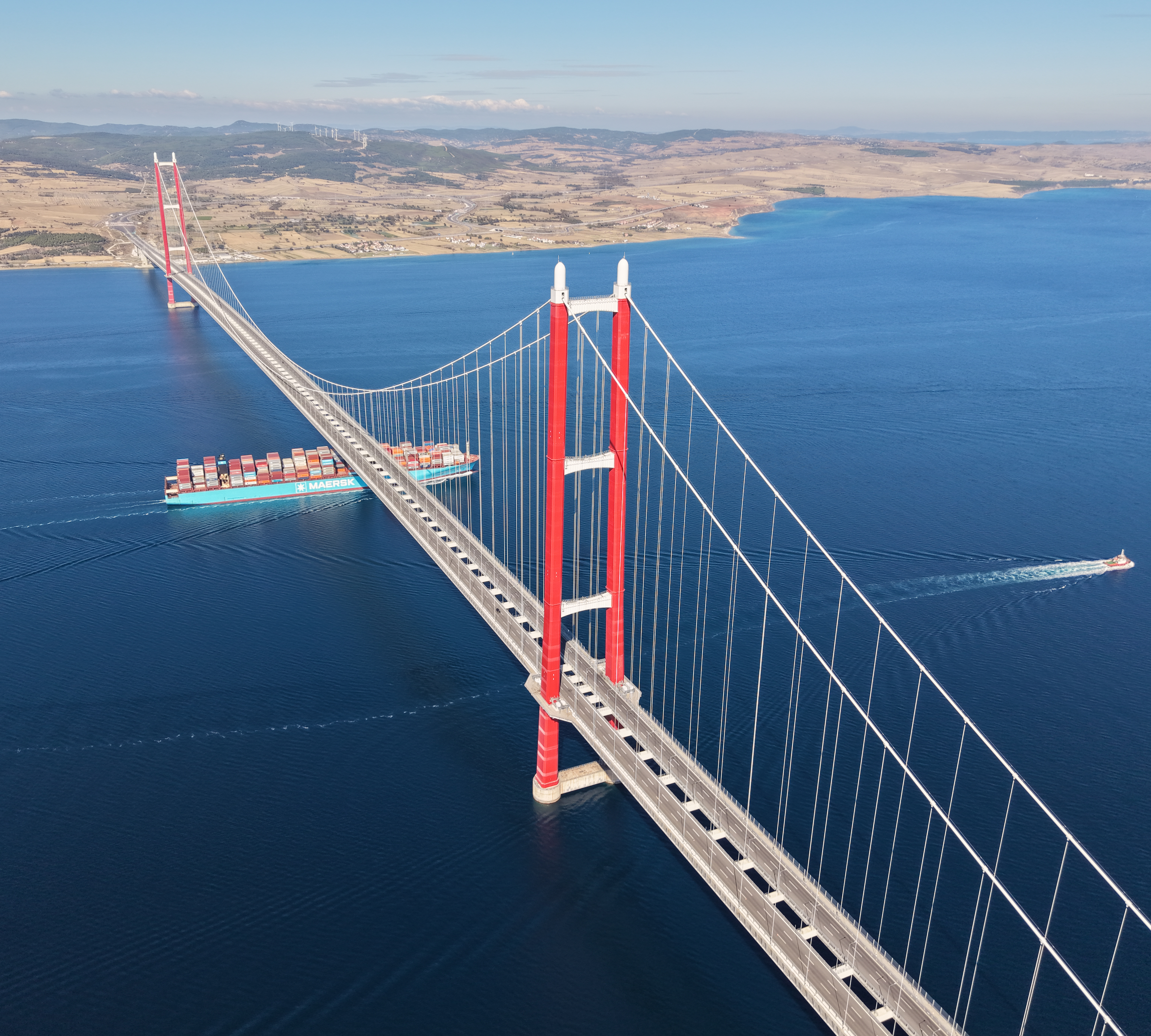

A comparison of the side elevation of the 1915 Çanakkale Bridge to the side elevations of some of the most notable bridges around the world on the same scale

== See also ==
- Osman Gazi Bridge
- Istanbul Canal
- Other crossings of the Turkish Straits:
  - Bosphorus Bridge
  - Eurasia Tunnel, undersea tunnel, crossing the Bosphorus for vehicular traffic, opened in December 2016
  - Fatih Sultan Mehmet Bridge
  - Great Istanbul Tunnel, a proposed three-level road-rail undersea tunnel
  - Marmaray Tunnel, undersea rail tunnel connecting the Asian and European sides of Istanbul
  - Yavuz Sultan Selim Bridge
  - Xerxes' Pontoon Bridges, an ancient attempted crossing at a similar location (480 BC)
