= Kırklareli District =

District of Kırklareli Province, Turkey

- District
- Map showing Kırklareli District in Kırklareli Province

- Location in Turkey Kırklareli District (Marmara)
- Coordinates: 41°44′N 27°14′E
- Country: Turkey
- Province: Kırklareli
- Seat: Kırklareli
- Area: 1,623 km^{2} (627 sq mi)
- Population (2022): 108,550
  - Density: 67/km^{2} (170/sq mi)
- Time zone: UTC+3 (TRT)

Kırklareli District (also: Merkez, meaning "central" in Turkish) is a district of the Kırklareli Province of Turkey. Its seat is the city of Kırklareli. Its area is 1,623 km^{2}, and its population is 108,550 (2022).

== Composition ==
There are four municipalities in Kırklareli District:

- İnece
- Kavaklı
- Kırklareli
- Üsküp

There are 41 villages in Kırklareli District:

- Ahmetçe
- Arizbaba
- Armağan
- Asılbeyli
- Bayramdere
- Beypınar
- Çağlayık
- Çayırlı
- Çeşmeköy
- Çukurpınar
- Değirmencik
- Demircihalil
- Dereköy
- Deveçatağı
- Dokuzhüyük
- Dolhan
- Düzorman
- Erikler
- Eriklice
- Geçitağzı
- Kadıköy
- Kapaklı
- Karadere
- Karahamza
- Karakoç
- Karıncak
- Kavakdere
- Kayalı
- Kızılcıkdere
- Kocahıdır
- Koruköy
- Koyunbaba
- Kula
- Kuzulu
- Paşayeri
- Şükrüpaşa
- Ürünlü
- Üsküpdere
- Yoğuntaş
- Yundalan
- Yürükbayırı
