= State road D.020 (Turkey) =

Road in Turkey

D.020

Route information
- Length: 455 km (283 mi)

Major junctions
- West end: Edirne East D.100
- East end: Adapazarı

Location
- Country: Turkey

Highway system
- Highways in Turkey; Motorways; List; State Highways; List

D.020 is a west-to-east state road in Turkey running both in Europe and Asia. It starts in Edirne East at the State road D.100 junction near İskender village, and ends in Adapazarı with interruption on the Istanbul Strait. The European part ends in Hasdal at Otoyol 2, and begins again in the Asian part in Sultanbeyli.

== Itinerary ==
Province	Location	Distance from (km)		
Province	Location	previous location	Ipsala	Kınalı
Edirne	Edirne East D.100 junction	0	0	455
Edirne	Hasköy, Edirne	20	20	435
Kırklareli	İnece	19	39	416
Kırklareli	Kırklareli	16	55	400
Kırklareli	Pınarhisar	28	83	372
Kırklareli	Vize	25	108	347
Tekirdağ	Saray	21	129	326
Istanbul	Hasdal O-2 junction	118	247	208
Istanbul	Sultanbeyli	-	247	208
Kocaeli	Kandıra	129	376	79
Sakarya	Kaynarca, Sakarya	17	393	62
Sakarya	Adapazarı	62	455	0
1.000 mi = 1.609 km; 1.000 km = 0.621 mi

== Intersections ==
- D.100 in Edirne East near İskender
- D.555 in Kırklareli
- D.565 in Pınarhisar
- D.567 in Saray
- D.569 in Subaşı, Çatalca
- O-2 in Hasdal
- O-4 in Sultanbeyli
- D.016 in Nişantepe
- D.605 in Kandıra
- D.014 in Kaynarca, Sakarya
