= Kapıkule =

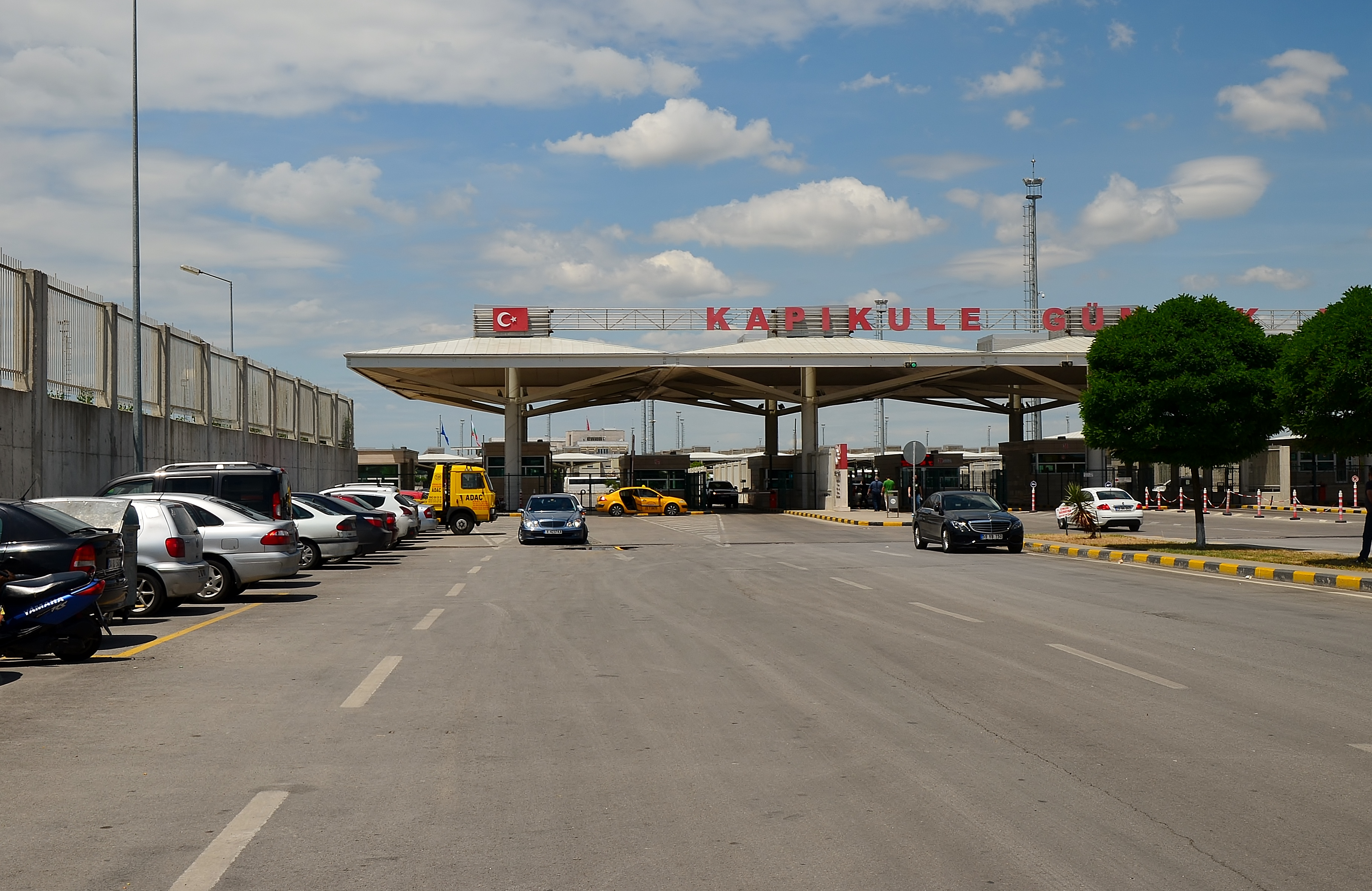
- Kapıkule Border Crossing Turkey to Bulgaria on the state road D-100

- Location within Turkey Location within Marmara
- Coordinates: 41°42′28.6″N 26°23′31.1″E
- Country: Turkey
- Region: Marmara Region
- Province: Edirne
- District: Edirne
- Time zone: UTC+3 (TRT)
- Postal code: 22770
- Area code: 0284

Kapıkule (meaning "gate tower" in Turkish) is the name of the Turkish border crossing point in Edirne Province on the border of Turkey and Bulgaria. Its counterpart on the Bulgarian side is Kapitan Andreevo. Together, they form the busiest land border crossing point in Europe.

Kapıkule, situated on the State road D100 (D.100) and European route E80, is also an important gateway for cargo transport to the countries east of Turkey. The Asian Highway Network route AH1 terminates at the border. Other land border checkpoints in western Turkey are the neighboring Hamzabeyli (on the D.535) and Dereköy (on the D.555) to Bulgaria and İpsala (on the D.110, E84) to Greece. The Kapıkule railway station, built in 1971, is located to the north of the town and handles more traffic than any other railway border crossing in Turkey.

In the dawn of the Revolutions of 1989, the Kapıkule border crossing saw a mass exodus of Turks fleeing the forced assimilation laws of the mid to late 1980s in the People's Republic of Bulgaria into Turkey.

== Border checkpoint facilities ==
Around 2.4 million vehicles and 4,000,000 people cross annually the border in Kapıkule, which makes 35% of all the vehicle and 42% of all the passenger traffic passing through the land borders of Turkey. To meet the demand resulting from growing international crossings, the Union of Chambers and Commodity Exchanges of Turkey (TOBB) signed an agreement with the government in August 2007 to completely overhaul the facilities on Build-Operate-Transfer basis at a cost of 132 million TRL (US$100 million in 2007) in exchange for twenty-year operation.

The border is famous as a crossing point for Turkish “gurbetçi", or expatriates, traveling back to Turkey from Europe. During the "“gurbetçi season" of 2025 alone, 22 June through 7 September 2025, a period of only 11 weeks, there were 604,202 vehicles crossing the border, and 2.5 million people.

The checkpoint reopened in the beginning of 2009 with thirteen passenger car and five truck gates for inbound, and seven passenger car and six truck gates for outbound traffic. High tech security equipment like smart-card controlled access, closed-circuit television and X-ray truck cargo check systems are installed at the border area. Commercial services are provided by fast-food restaurants, duty-free shops, outlet stores, supermarkets and banks. The group of 24 buildings, which house various service facilities, cover 15,000 m^{2} (160,000 sq ft) on the 289,050 m^{2} (3,111,300 sq ft) wide checkpoint area.

== Incidents ==
On 24 May 2023, 104 followers of the Ahmadi Religion of Peace and Light seeking asylum in Bulgaria were detained at Kapıkule and violently harassed by Turkish authorities.
