= İnece =

- Municipality
- Location in Turkey İnece (Marmara)
- Coordinates: 41°41′N 27°04′E
- Country: Turkey
- Province: Kırklareli
- District: Kırklareli
- Elevation: 100 m (330 ft)
- Population (2022): 1,580
- Time zone: UTC+3 (TRT)
- Postal code: 39050
- Area code: 0288

İnece is a town (belde) in the Kırklareli District, Kırklareli Province, Turkey. Its population is 1,580 (2022).

== Geography ==
İnece is situated on the Turkish state highway D.020 which connects Kırklareli to Edirne. İnece is to the west of Kırklareli at a distance of 13 kilometres (8.1 mi).

== History ==
During the Ottoman Empire era İnece (then known as Enidjiya) was founded by Bulgarians. The first mention of the settlement in Ottoman documents was in 1677. During the First Balkan War along with Turkish settlements around, it was captured by Bulgaria on 12 September 1912. But when it was returned to Ottoman Empire in the Second Balkan War on 21 July 1913 the Bulgarian population left the settlement and they were replaced by Turkish people from various Balkan countries which annexed Ottoman territory in Western Thrace. Although the settlement was captured by Greece in 1920, it was returned to Turkey on 10 November 1922. In 1954 the settlement was declared a seat of township.

== Notable people ==
- Candan Erçetin Turkish singer and songwriter
- Erdal Kalkan MP
