= Hamzabeyli, Lalapaşa =

Hamzabeyli
- Village
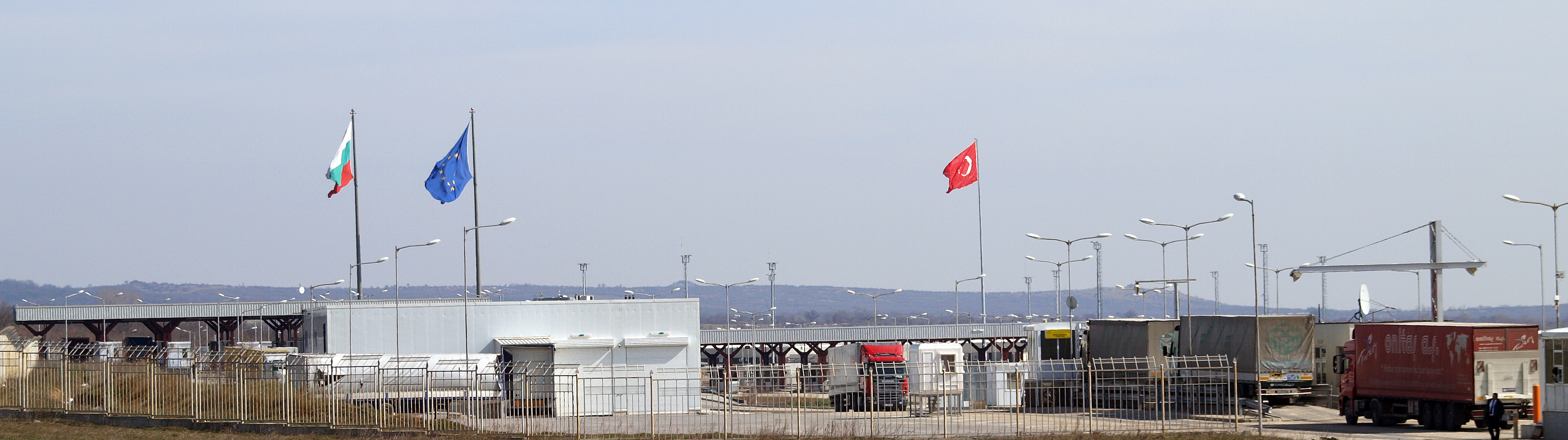
- A view of the Hamzabeyli border crossing point with its counterpart Lesovo (note the exclusive truck traffic)

- Location within Turkey Location within Marmara
- Coordinates: 41°57′N 26°36′E
- Country: Turkey
- Province: Edirne
- District: Lalapaşa
- Population (2022): 177
- Time zone: UTC+3 (TRT)
- Postal code: 22950
- Area code: 0284

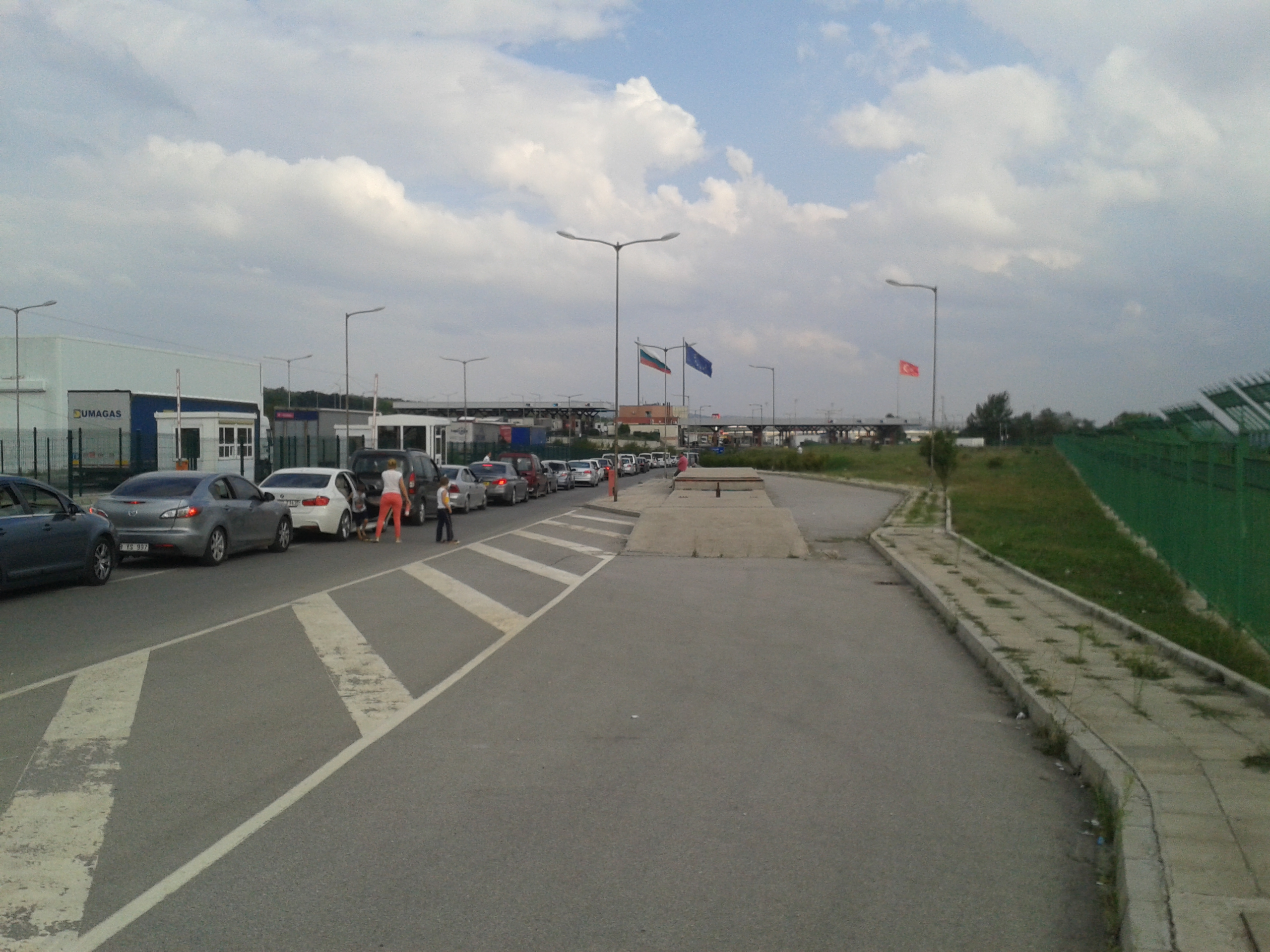
A queue on the border check point

Hamzabeyli is a village in Lalapaşa District of Edirne Province, Turkey. The village had a population of 177 in 2022. It is one of the three border crossing points between Turkey and Bulgaria. The Hamzabeyli border crossing is the newest bridge along the border, opening between Bulgaria and Turkey in 2006.

Hamzabeyli border crossing point was previously in use in the Ottoman Empire, but closed after the fall of the empire. By the entry of Bulgaria into the European Union, the vehicle traffic between the two countries has increased significantly, therefore making the reopening of a new border crossing point necessary. The Hamzabeyli crossing point is mainly used for commercial traffic (e.g. trucks) but non-commercial (e.g. automobile, motorcycle) traffic is also allowed. The Hamzabeyli border crossing point features:

- 500,000 vehicle and 1,500,000 passenger capacity, annually.
- 64,000 m^{2} total open area.
- 2,000 m^{2} commercial buildings area.
- 1,800 m^{2} administrative buildings area.
- 4+4 automobile and 4+4 truck platforms (16 in total).
- 2 vehicle weight scales and 2 x-ray vehicle scanners.
- A duty-free shop, a bank, an insurance company and a restaurant.

The Hamzabeyli border crossing has relatively less traffic than its neighbours, namely Kapıkule and Dereköy—despite its truck traffic. This is because it provides access to mid-Bulgaria where there are no major cities and connecting roads to neighbouring countries. Whereas Kapıkule is closer to Sofia and thus to Western Europe; Dereköy is located closer to Burgas and Varna.
