= Mürşitpınar =

- Neighbourhood
- Location in Turkey Mürşitpınar (Şanlıurfa)
- Coordinates: 36°54′5″N 38°20′57″E
- Country: Turkey
- Province: Şanlıurfa
- District: Suruç
- Population (2022): 713
- Time zone: UTC+3 (TRT)

Mürşitpınar is a neighbourhood of the municipality and district of Suruç, Şanlıurfa Province, Turkey. Its population is 713 (2022). It lies on the Syrian border, adjacent to the Syrian city Kobanî. There is a border crossing south of the village, and a (closed) station on the Berlin–Baghdad railway.
