= Otoyol 2 =

Highway in Turkey

O-2
- İstanbul Second Beltway; İstanbul 2.Çevreyolu

Route information
- Length: 34 km (21 mi)
- Restrictions: No through trucks, buses and international transition allowed on the Fatih Sultan Mehmet Bridge

Major junctions
- West end: O-3 in "Mahmutbey Doğu K20" junction, Bağcılar Istanbul

- East end: O-4 in "Anadolu Otoyolu K10" Junction Ataşehir, Ümraniye Istanbul

Location
- Country: Turkey
- Regions: Marmara
- Provinces: Istanbul Province
- Major cities: Istanbul

Highway system
- Highways in Turkey; Motorways; List; State Highways; List
← O-1	→ O-3

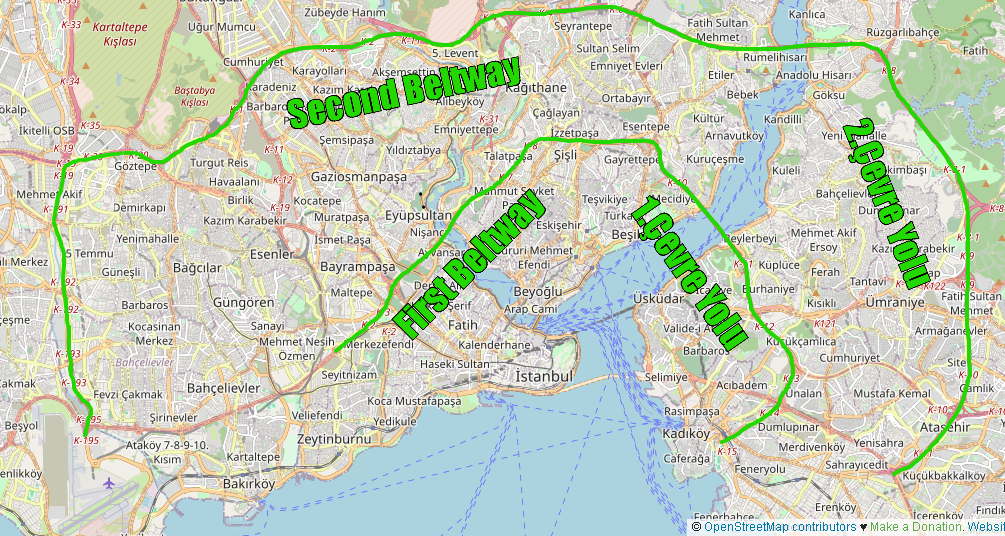
istanbul çevre yolları

Otoyol 2 (English: Motorway 2), abbreviated as O-2, locally referred to as 2.Çevreyolu, TEM yolu or TEM in Turkish—which refers to Trans-European Motorway (English: The Second Beltway), is a motorway in Istanbul, Turkey that forms the outer ring road of the city connecting European and Asian parts via the Fatih Sultan Mehmet Bridge. It starts in Mahmutbey East intersection on the European part, where the Avrupa Otoyolu (English: Europe Motorway) links, runs through the northern outskirts of the city passing over the Bosporus Strait, and terminates at the western end of the Anadolu Otoyolu (English: Anatolia Motorway), before the toll plaza is situated. Otoyol 2 is toll-free, but a two-way toll collection practice has been implemented on the Fatih Sultan Mehmet Bridge. The O-2 motorway connects the European motorway in the west and with the Anatolian motorway in the east

== Exit list ==
District/Junction	Km	Mi	Exit No.	Destinations	Notes
Mahmutbey west junction	0.0	0.0	K19	O-3 southbound istanbul Second Beltway route start K195 junction	nourthbound İstanbul Airport southbound Bakırköy; Atatürk Airport
Mahmutbey east junction	2.7	1.67	K20	O-3 istanbul second beltway route	
Metris junction	3.5	2.4	K1	west O-3 east O-2	nourthbound Sultangazi southbound Gaziosmanpaşa
Gaziosmanpaşa junction	6.7	2.6	K2	Eski Edirne Asf.-Arnavutköy	
KMO-Hasdal junction	9.1	4.5	K2-1	Başakşehir Connector	
Kemerburgaz junction	10.9	5.4	K3	-Hasdal,Kemerburgaz	
Hasdal junction	12.2	7.1	K4	Hasdal/Okmeydanı Connector- O-1	
Seyrantepe junction	14.1	7.8	K5		
Harb Akademileri junction	15.7	9.9	K6	Büyükdere Cd.	West bound entrance and east bound exit only
Beşiktaş	16.0	0.0		Harp Akademileri Tunnel; 456 m (1,496 ft)	
Levent junction	17.7	11.2	K7	Levent 1 Connector- Levent, Etiler and Baltalimanı	East bound entrance and west bound exit only
Sarıyer	18.6	11.9		Fatih Sultan Mehmet Bridge Toll Plaza; Electronic toll payment only.	₺47.00 toll:13/01/2025
Sarıyer; Beykoz	19.7	12.7		Fatih Sultan Mehmet Bridge; 1,510 m (4,950 ft)	
Kavacık junction	23.6	14.7	K8	Yeni Riva Yolu- Beykoz, Çayağzı, Riva and Anadoluhisarı	
Çamlık junction	28.6	17.8	K8-1	Çekmeköy Connector-	
Ümraniye junction	30.9	19.2	K9	-Üsküdar, Çekmeköy, Sarıgazi, Sultanbeyli and Şile	
Ataşehir-Ümraniye Anadolu otoyolu junction	34.7	21.6	K10	Kocaeli-Ankara	
1.000 mi = 1.609 km; 1.000 km = 0.621 mi: Tolled

== See also ==
- List of highways in Turkey
