= Çukurpınar, Kırklareli =

Çukurpınar
- Village
- Location within Turkey Location within Marmara
- Country: Turkey
- Province: Kırklareli
- District: Kırklareli
- Population (2022): 299
- Time zone: UTC+3 (TRT)

Çukurpınar (formerly: Sazara) is a village in Kırklareli District of Kırklareli Province, Turkey. Its population is 299 (2022). The area is covered with extensive forests.

Known since Roman times, the village is today located near the modern border with Bulgaria, in the European (Balkans) part of Turkey and is the location of a migrant hostel. The village economy of agriculture and animal husbandry includes ravioli and dry beans. The village is also home to a great cave complex, open to visitors for much of the year. The cave has extensive stalactites and stalagmites as well as 15 kinds of bats. The limestone topography allows for Marble quarrying within the village limits.

The village has water and sewage, paved roads, a school, post office and medical center.
