= State road D.110 (Turkey) =

Road in Turkey

D.110

Route information
- Part of E84 / E90
- Length: 172 km (107 mi)

Major junctions
- West end: A 2 at the Greek border near İpsala, Edirne Province
- D.550 in Keşan D.555 near Malkara

- East end: D.100 in Kınalı, Istanbul Province

Location
- Country: Turkey

Highway system
- Highways in Turkey; Motorways; List; State Highways; List

D.110 is a 172 km (107 mi) long east-west state road in Turkey running from the border with Greece, near İpsala, to the junction with the D.100 in Kınalı. The road is the main route into Greece and one of only two roads that cross the Greek border from Turkey. The entire route is a four-lane highway, except for the two-lane bridge crossing the Maritsa river. The D.110 is a part of the European route E84 for its entire length and part of the E90 from the Greek border to Keşan.

== Route description ==
=== Edirne Province ===
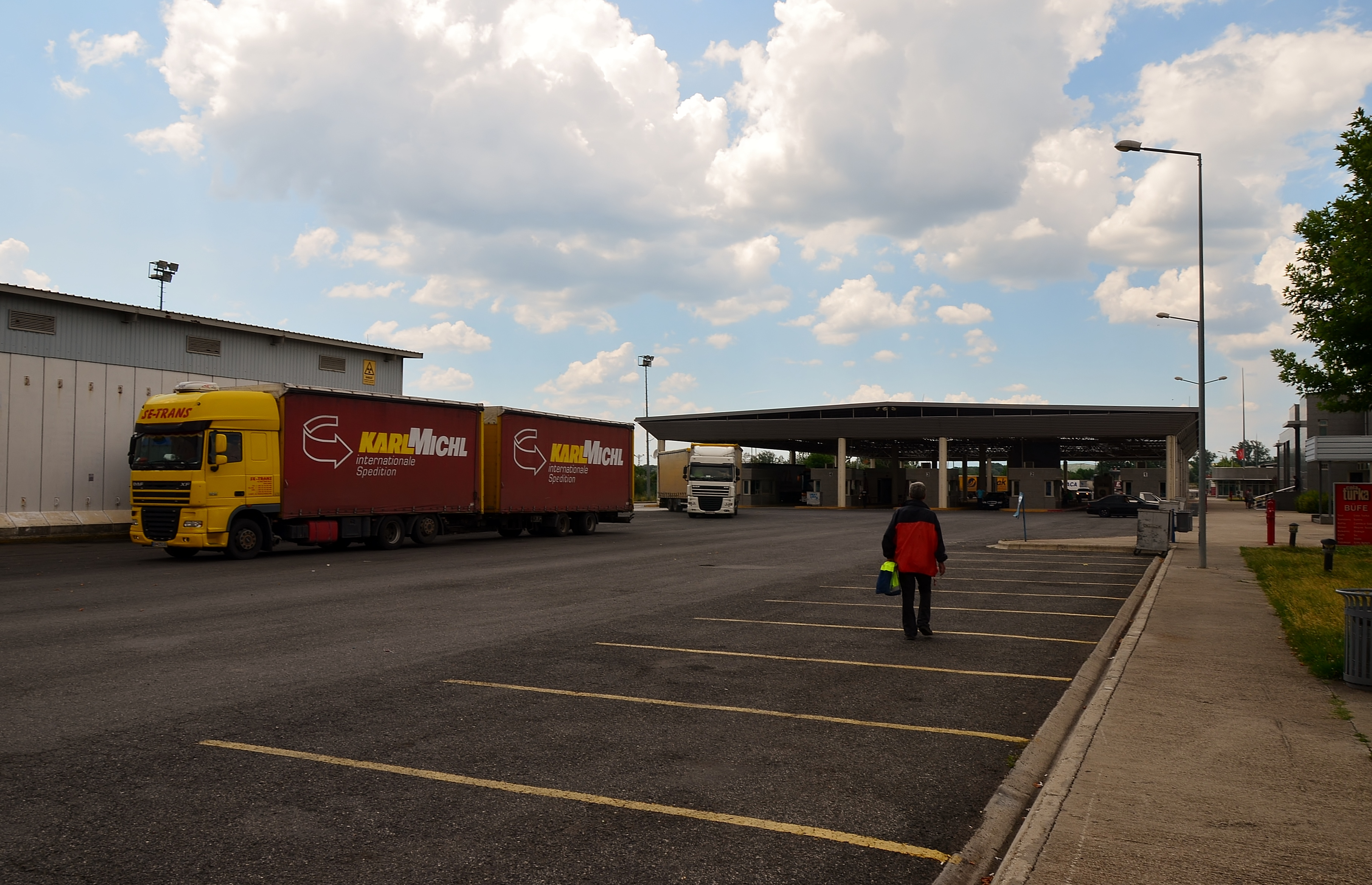
West end of D-110: Ipsala Checkpoint at Greece–Turkey border crossing

The D.110 begins at the Greece/Turkey border on a two-lane bridge crossing over the Maritsa river. Following the Turkish customs checkpoint, the route becomes a four-lane highway heading east and is named London Asphalt (Turkish: Londra Asfaltı) until the intersection with the İL 22-50, just south of İpsala. Past the intersection, the route is named the Tekirdağ-İpsala Road (Turkish: Tekirdağ-İpsala Yolu) until reaching the city of Tekirdağ. Just north of Keşan, the D.110 crosses the D.550. The intersection consists of a roundabout with a flying junction for westbound traffic heading south on the D.550. After Keşan the road continues east until passing through a few rolling hills and entering Tekirdağ Province.

=== Tekirdağ Province ===
Once past the hills, the D.110 once again enters a mostly flat plain. Before the town of Malkara, the route intersects with the İL 59-53. About 10 km (6.2 mi) past Malkara, the route intersects with the D.555, which heads south to Şarköy. Coming south from Balıkesir and Çanakkale, the Kınalı-Balıkesir Motorway, currently under construction, will parallel the D.110 for the remainder of its route east to Kınalı. Four exits connecting the motorway to the D.110 are planned and as of 2017, one is under construction, near Malkara. Once the route reaches Tekirdağ, it heads northeast, diverging from Atatürk Boulevard running through the city, and skims the outskirts as a beltway. This section of the road is named the Kanuni Sultan Suleiman Boulevard, after the 10th Sultan of the Ottoman Empire and intersects with another section of the D.555, followed by the D.565. East of Tekirdağ, the D.110 runs along the coast of the Sea of Marmara serving many vacation homes along the route. This portion of the route is named the Tekirdağ-Istanbul Road (Turkish: Tekirdağ-İstanbul Yolu). After passing just north of Marmaraereğlisi, the D.110 intersects with the D.567 and enters the Istanbul Province, shortly after.

=== Istanbul Province ===
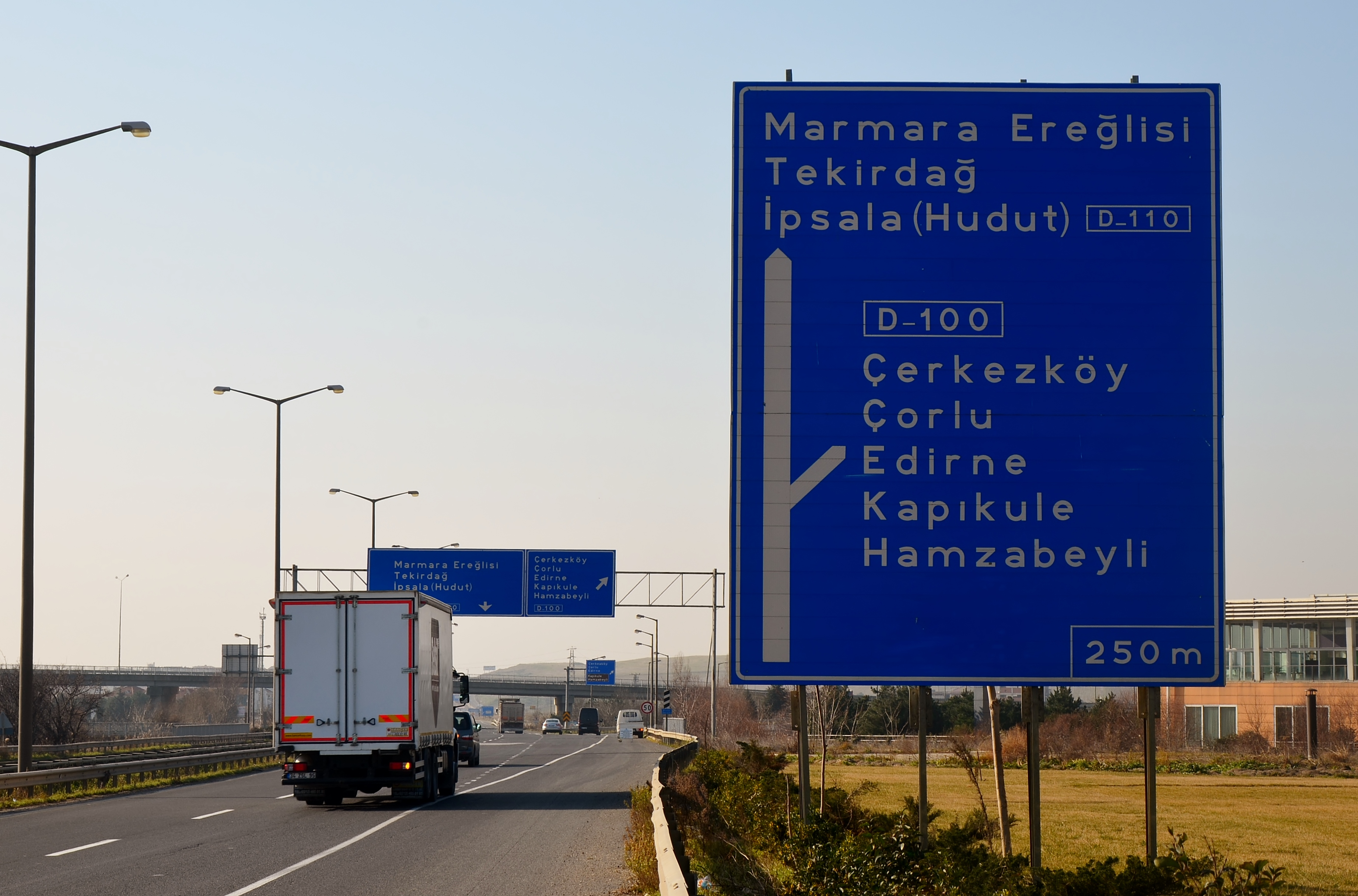
East end of D-110:Kınalı junction in Silivri district of Istanbul Province

The D.110 continues along the coast through many unincorporated neighborhoods of vacation homes until reaching the D.100 in Kınalı. The two routes interchange via a Trumpet interchange and the D.100 continues towards Istanbul.

== Itinerary ==
Province	Location	Distance from (km)		
Province	Location	previous location	Ipsala	Kınalı
Edirne
Edirne	Ipsala Checkpoint at Greece–Turkey border crossing	0	0	172
Edirne	Ipsala	6	6	166
Edirne	Keşan	23	29	143
Tekirdağ	Malkara	23	52	120
Tekirdağ	Tekirdağ	61	113	59
Tekirdağ	Marmara Ereğlisi	40	153	19
Istanbul	Kınalı	19	172	0
1.000 mi = 1.609 km; 1.000 km = 0.621 mi

== Intersections ==
- D.100 in Kınalı near Silivri
- D.550 near Keşan
- D.555 near Tekirdağ
- D.565 in Tekirdağ

== See also ==
- European route E84
