= Üsküp, Kırklareli =

Üsküp
- Municipality
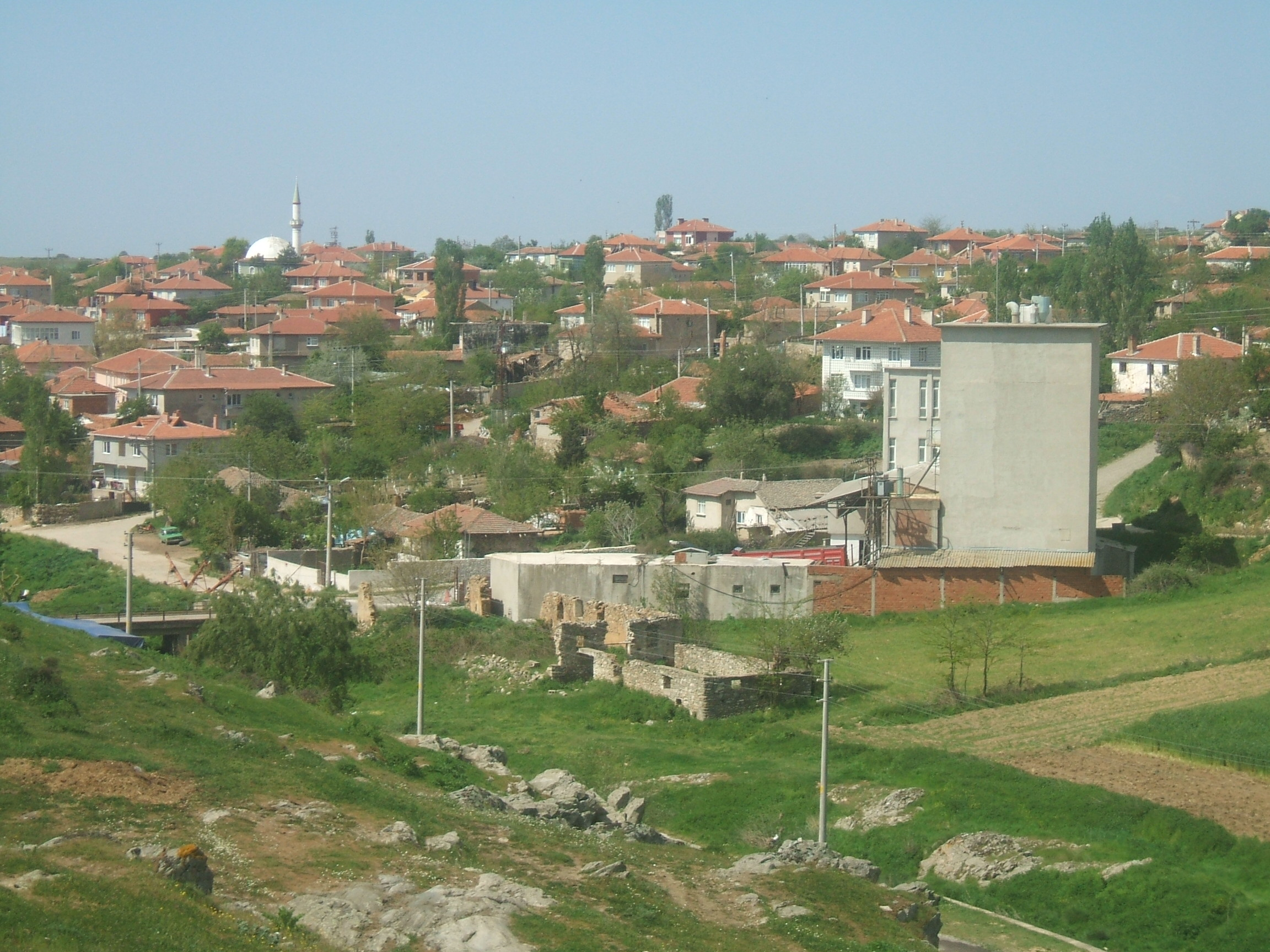

- Location within Turkey Location within Marmara
- Coordinates: 41°44′N 27°24′E
- Country: Turkey
- Province: Kırklareli
- District: Kırklareli
- Elevation: 290 m (950 ft)
- Population (2022): 2,195
- Time zone: UTC+3 (TRT)
- Postal code: 39070
- Area code: 0288

Üsküp (Greek: Σκοπός) is a town (belde) in the Kırklareli District, Kırklareli Province, Turkey. Its population is 2,195 (2022).

== Geography ==
Üsküp is situated to the east of Kırklareli at a distance of 16 kilometres (9.9 mi).

== History ==
Üsküp is an old settlement and the name of the town may refer to Scythians (Turkish: İskit), but more likely is a Turkish corruption of the Greek word "Skopos." In 1368, during the reign of Murat I the settlement was annexed to the Ottoman Empire. 17th-century Turkish traveller Evliya Çelebi describes Üsküp as a relatively populated place famous for wine production. Evliya mentions that hundreds of Muslims of the neighbouring Kırklareli, Vize and Saray towns married the Greek and Bulgarian girls of Üsküp, who were renowned for their beauty, and had many children. The Bulgarian inhabitants left the settlement in 1913 while the Greek population stayed until the end of the Turkish War of Independence. According to the population exchange between Greece and Turkey agreement, the Greeks were replaced by the Turks from Greece. The same year the settlement was declared a seat of township. Many of the Greek residents transferred to Greece founded the village of Neos Skopos near Serres, Greece.

== Economy ==
The town is still known for vineyards and wine production. The best Papaskarasi grapes are produced here. The decomposed granite soils in Üsküp gives different aromas to grapes here. Other crops are vegetables and fruits. There are also some small factories around the town.
