= European route E84 =

Road in trans-European E-road network

E84

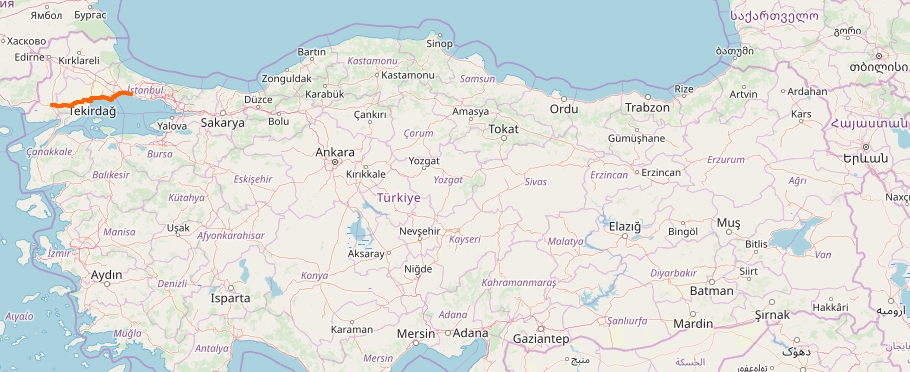

Major junctions
- East end: Silivri
- West end: Keşan

Location
- Countries: Turkey

Highway system
- International E-road network; A Class; B Class

European route E 84 is a road part of the International E-road network. It begins in İpsala border gate (to/from Greece) in Turkey and run through Keşan, Malkara, Tekirdağ and Marmaraereğlisi and ends in Silivri, Turkey.

The road follows: Keşan - Tekirdağ - Silivri. It is a part of the D-110.

== Route ==
Turkey

- D.110: Keşan ( E87 E90) - Tekirdağ - Silivri ( E90)
