= State road D.555 (Turkey) =

Highway in Turkey

D.555

Route information
- Part of E87
- Length: 156 km (97 mi)

Major junctions
- North end: Dereköy Checkpoint at the Bulgaria-Turkey border crossing
- South end: Tekirdağ D.110 junction

Location
- Country: Turkey

Highway system
- Highways in Turkey; Motorways; List; State Highways; List

D.555 is a north-to-south state road in the European part of Turkey. It starts at Dereköy Checkpoint at the Bulgaria-Turkey border crossing and ends in Tekirdağ at the D.110 junction. It is part of the European route E87 between its starting point and the D.100 junction in Babaeski.

== Itinerary ==
| Province | Location | Distance from (km) | | |
| Province | Location | previous location | Dereköy CP | Tekirdağ |
|---|---|---|---|---|
| Kırklareli | Dereköy Checkpoint | 0 | 0 | 156 |
| Kırklareli | Dereköy | 12 | 12 | 144 |
| Kırklareli | Pınarhisar | 29 | 41 | 115 |
| Kırklareli | Karacaoğlan | 24 | 65 | 91 |
| Kırklareli | Babaeski | 10 | 75 | 81 |
| Tekirdağ | Hayrabolu | 32 | 107 | 49 |
| Tekirdağ | Banarlı | 30 | 137 | 19 |
| Tekirdağ | Tekirdağ | 19 | 156 | 0 |
1.000 mi = 1.609 km; 1.000 km = 0.621 mi

== Intersections ==
- D.020 in Pınarhisar
- D.100 in Babaeski
- D.110 in Tekirdağ
