= Dereköy, Kırklareli =

Dereköy
- Village
- Location within Turkey Location within Marmara
- Coordinates: 41°55′N 27°22′E
- Country: Turkey
- Province: Kırklareli
- District: Kırklareli
- Elevation: 446 m (1,463 ft)
- Population (2022): 432
- Time zone: UTC+3 (TRT)
- Postal code: 39000
- Area code: 0288

Dereköy (Bulgarian: Дерекьово, romanized: Derek'ovo) is a village of Kırklareli District of Kırklareli Province, Marmara region, western Turkey. Its population is 432 (2022). It is one of the three land border crossing points between Bulgaria and Turkey.

== Geography ==
The village is located in Strandzha mountains, 20 km north of the centre of Kırklareli, near the border with Bulgaria.

== History ==
In the 19th century, Dereköy was a Bulgarian village in the Kaza of Kırklareli, which was in turn in the Vilayet of Edirne. In 1873, the village consisted of 360 households with 1684 Bulgarians. After the Russo-Ottoman War of 1877–1878, first families from Dereköy migrated to Razgrad and Tutrakan to the newly sovereign Bulgaria. According to statistics provided by Ljubomir Miletitsch, Dereköy had about 150 households and 634 inhabitants in 1900, all of whom were Christian Bulgarians.

After the outbreak of the Balkan War in 1912, 16 volunteers from Dereköy fought in the Macedonia-Edirne-volunteer corps of the Bulgarian army. After the outbreak of the Second Balkan War, when the Turkish army recaptured eastern Thrace, the whole Bulgarian population of Dereköy escaped to Bulgaria.

== The border ==
The border crossing point lies about 11 km north west of the village centre. The Bulgarian counterpart is Malko Tarnovo. It was opened in 1970. It occupies a land size of 17.811 m2. Modernization of the facilities is still ongoing.
