= State road D.100 (Turkey) =

Road in Turkey

D.100

Route information
- Part of E80 / AH1 / AH5 / AH85
- Length: 1,788 km (1,111 mi)

Major junctions
- West end: A 4 at the Bulgarian border near Kapıkule
- East end: Road 32 at the Iranian border near Gürbulak

Location
- Country: Turkey

Highway system
- Highways in Turkey; Motorways; List; State Highways; List

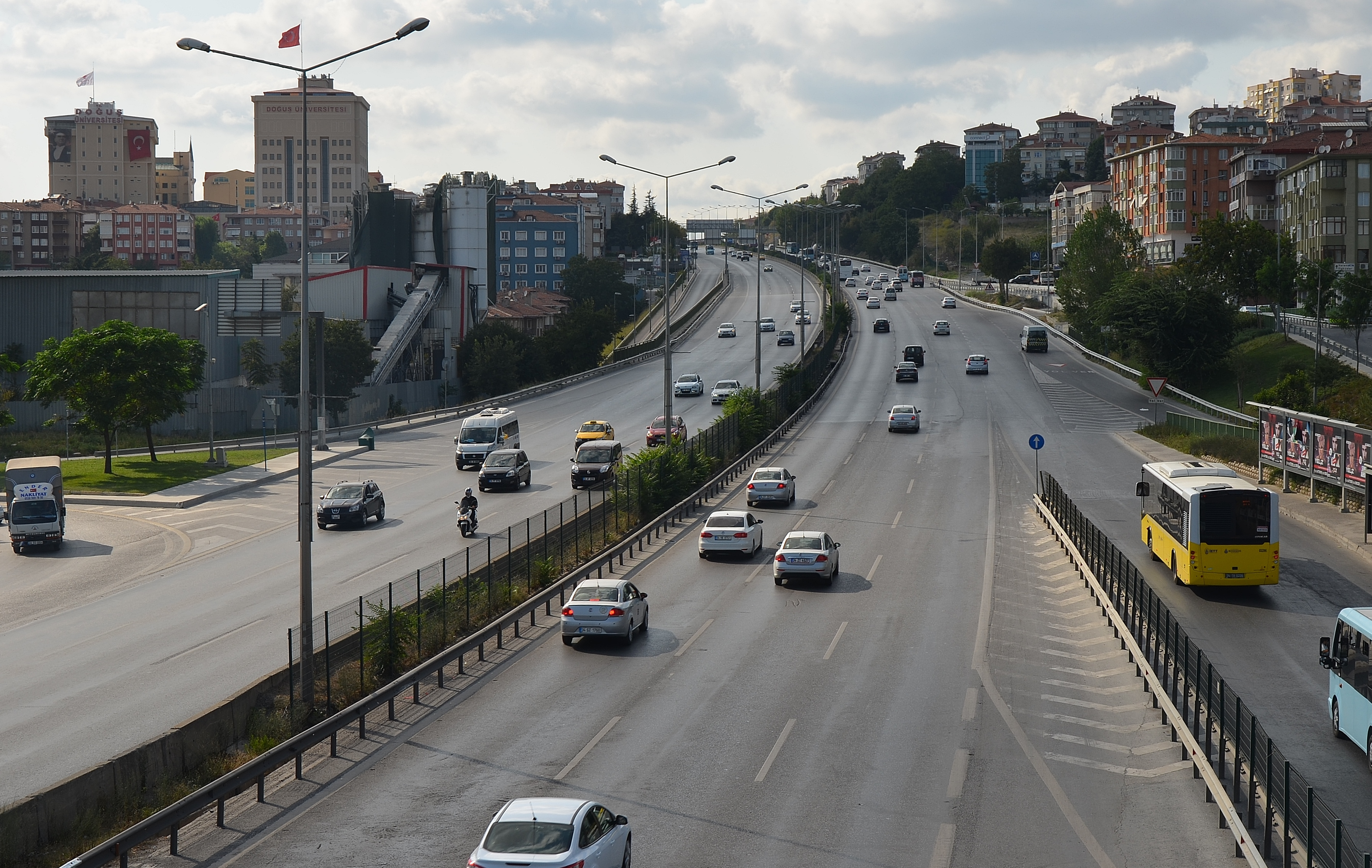
State road D.100 in Kadıköy, Istanbul seen westwards

D.100, popularly referred to as E-5, is a west-to-east state highway in Turkey. The route starts at Kapıkule, the Bulgarian border check point, and ends in Gürbulak, the Iranian border check point. Running all the way from west to east, it crosses most of the north-to-south state roads, including the D.650, D.750, D.850 and D.950.

The highway is joint into the European Route E-80 in some parts.

The highway's name was changed in 1992 to D.100, but the public refers to it as E-5 to this day. The actual E-5 highway is between Scotland and Spain spanning 3,100 kilometers.

== Itinerary ==
Province	Location	Distance from Kapıkule (km)	Distance from Kapıkule (mile)	Distance from Gürbulak (km)	Distance from Gürbulak (mile)
Edirne Province
Edirne Province	Kapıkule (Bulgarian border); Maritsa motorway	0	0	1788	1111
Edirne Province	Edirne	23	14	1765	1097
Kırklareli Province	Lüleburgaz	95	59	1693	1052
Tekirdağ Province	Çorlu	142	88	1646	1023
Istanbul Province	Istanbul	253	157	1535	954
Kocaeli Province
Kocaeli Province	Gebze	313	194	1475	917
Kocaeli Province	İzmit	364	226	1426	884
Sakarya Province	Adapazarı	401	249	1387	862
Bolu Province
Bolu Province	Bolu	515	320	1273	791
Bolu Province	Gerede	568	353	1220	758
Çankırı Province	Ilgaz	705	438	1083	673
Çorum Province	Osmancık	815	506	973	605
Amasya Province
Amasya Province	Merzifon	873	546	910	565
Amasya Province	Amasya	924	574	864	536
Tokat Province	Niksar	1030	641	758	471
Sivas Province	Koyulhisar (junction)	1117	694	671	417
Erzincan Province	Erzincan	1288	800	500	311
Erzurum Province
Erzurum Province	Aşkale	1423	884	365	227
Erzurum Province	Erzurum	1477	918	311	193
Erzurum Province	Horasan	1561	970	227	141
Ağrı Province
Ağrı Province	Ağrı	1659	1030	129	80
Ağrı Province	Doğubayazıt	1751	1089	35	22
Ağrı Province	Gürbulak (Iranian border); Road 32	1788	1111	0	0

== Helicopter crash ==
On March 10, 2017, a Sikorsky S-76 helicopter owned by Swan Aviation hit the antenna of the Endem TV Tower in heavy fog and crashed onto the State Road D100. All seven people on board were killed.
