= İzmir–Ankara Motorway =

Highway in Turkey

İzmir–Ankara Otoyolu

Route information
- Length: 501.1 km (311.4 mi)

Major junctions
- West end: O-5 near Turgutlu

- D.650 near Altıntaş D.200 near Sivrihisar

- East end: O-20 near Ankara

Location
- Country: Turkey
- Regions: Aegean, Central Anatolia
- Provinces: Afyon, Ankara, Eskişehir, Kütahya, Manisa, Uşak
- Major cities: Ankara, Uşak, Afyonkarahisar

Highway system
- Highways in Turkey; Motorways; List; State Highways; List

The İzmir–Ankara Motorway (Turkish: İzmir–Ankara Otoyolu) is a planned 501.1-kilometre-long (311.4 mi) motorway that would connect İzmir, on the Aegean coast, with Ankara, the capital of Turkey. The motorway is expected to be completed by 2023. Despite the name, the motorway would not begin or even run through İzmir, starting near Turgutlu, Manisa at an interchange with the O-5. Near Ankara the route would end at an interchange with the Ankara Beltway.

== Route ==
Km	Type	Description	Notes
0,0		Interchange with Ankara Beltway	O-20
2,5		Motorway Service Area	
2,8		Tulumtaş Junction	
10,5		Motorway Service Area	
18,1		Temelli-Yenikent Junction	
35,5		Motorway Service Area	
46,8		Polatlı East Junction	
60,0		Motorway Maintenance Area	
61,5		Polatlı West Junction	
61,5		Motorway Service Area	
82,5		Motorway Service Area	
96,5		Sivrihisar East Junction	D.200
102,5		Motorway Service Area	
119,6		Tunnel 1	2929 m
130,0		Sivrihisar West Junction	O-22
130,0		Motorway Maintenance Area	
135,5		Motorway Service Area	
150,5		Motorway Service Area	
156,7		Çifteler Junction	D.675
176,5		Motorway Service Area	
189,3		Börüklü Tunnel	1255 m
191,5		Motorway Service Area	
203,2		Seyitgazi Junction	D.665
203,5		Motorway Maintenance Area	
206,5		Motorway Service Area	
214,2		Tunnel 3	1061 m
216,6		Tunnel 4	2688 m
223,0		Motorway Service Area	
243,5		Motorway Maintenance Area	
244,8		Kütahya-Afyonkarahisar Junction	D.650
250,0		Motorway Service Area	
268,3		Dumlupınar Junction	D.615
269,3		Motorway Service Area	
273,9		Tunnel 5	3757 m
295,2		Motorway Maintenance Area	
295,8		Banaz Junction	
303,6		Motorway Service Area	
322,3		Uşak East Junction	
323,0		Motorway Service Area	
342,3		Uşak West Junction	
352,5		Motorway Service Area	
369,1		Tunnel 6	2700 m
378,5		Motorway Service Area	
391,5		Tunnel 7	1728 m
398,7		Kula East Junction	
399,0		Motorway Maintenance Area	
405,0		Motorway Service Area	
409,8		Tunnel 8	2823 m
418,2		Kula West Junction	
419,0		Motorway Service Area	
421,4		Tunnel 9	4637 m
437,7		Adala Junction	
443,5		Motorway Service Area	
453,5		Motorway Service Area	
460,8		Tunnel 10	3069 m
470,5		Motorway Maintenance Area	
470,6		Gölmarmara-Akhisar Junction	
473,5		Motorway Service Area	
475,5		Tunnel 11	2770 m
480,7		Ahmetli Junction	
482,6		Tunnel 12	857 m
495,5		Motorway Service Area	
501,1		Interchange with Otoyol 5	O-5 / E881
