= Provincial road 34-02 (Turkey) =

Provincial road 34-02 İl yolu 34-02
- Hüseyinli Yolu
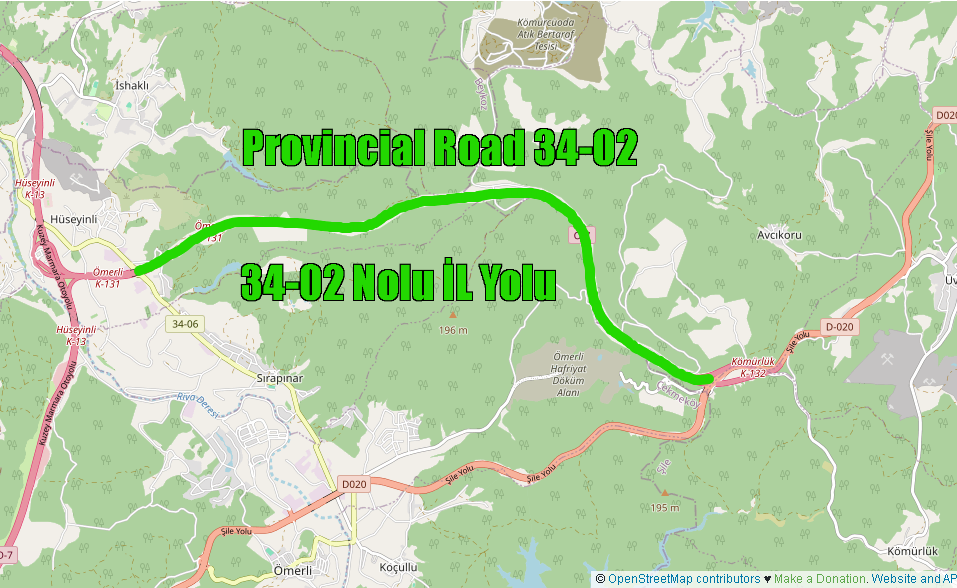
- provincial highway 34-02

Route information
- Length: 11 km (6.8 mi)
- Existed: 2016–present

Major junctions
- From: O-7 in Çekmeköy, Istanbul

- To: D.020 in Şile, Istanbul

Location
- Country: Turkey
- Regions: Marmara
- Provinces: Istanbul
- Major cities: Çekmeköy, Şile

Highway system
- Highways in Turkey; Motorways; List; State Highways; List

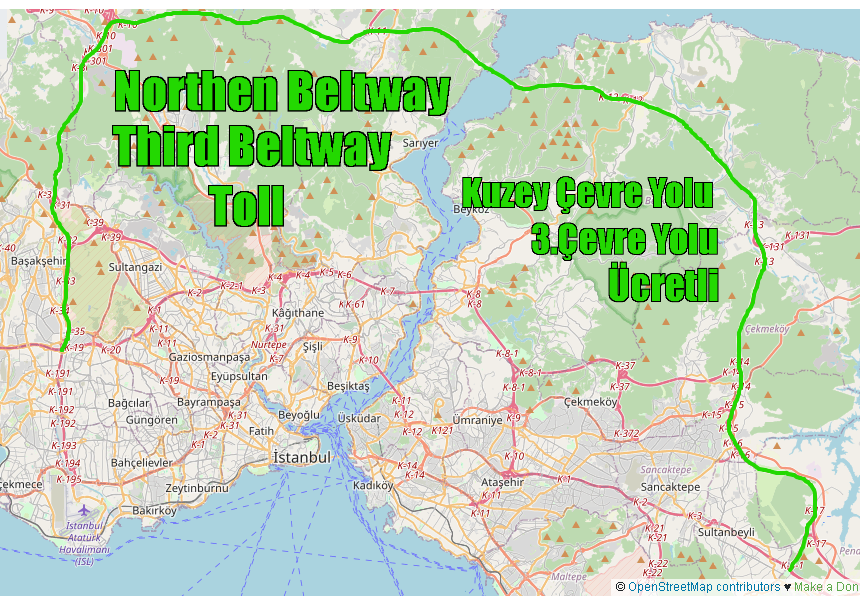
Northern Beltway—Third Beltway

Provincial Road 34-02 in Turkey is a 6-lane, 11km-long divided first-class provincial highway. It is under the responsibility of the General Directorate of Highways. It connects the 3rd Beltway (northern Beltway O-7) and the D.020 "Kömürlük" junction.

== Exit list ==
The entire route is in Istanbul Province.

District	km	mi	Exit	Destinations	Notes
Çekmeköy	0.0	0.0	K13	O-7 "Hüseyinli" junction	O7 İstanbul Third Beltway, Northern Beltway
Çekmeköy	0.35	0.22		Huseyinli Toll booths	
Çekmeköy	0.9	0.56	K131	"Ömerli" Junction	
Şile	9.4	5.8	K132	D.020"Kömürlük" Junction	
1.000 mi = 1.609 km; 1.000 km = 0.621 mi: Tolled
