= State road D.060 (Turkey) =

D.060

Route information
- Length: 225 km (140 mi)

Major junctions
- West end: D.950 east of Yusufeli, Artvin Province
- East end: M7 Tiknis border crossing, Akyazı, Kars Province

Location
- Country: Turkey

Highway system
- Highways in Turkey; Motorways; List; State Highways; List

D-060 is a west–east state road in northeastern Turkey that serves the land border crossing to Armenia, which is currently closed. The 225 km (140 mi) route starts in the west at the intersection of D.950, 18 km (11 mi) east of Yusufeli, Artvin Province, and terminates at Turkey's Tiknis border checkpoint with Armenia 12 km (7.5 mi) east of Akyaka, Kars. The route D-060 continues in Armenia as M7.

== Itinerary ==
Province	City/Town	Distance from previous location	Distance from West end	Distance from East end
Artvin	Intersection D.950	0	0	225
Erzurum	Intersection P.25-06 to Olur	43	43	182
Erzurum	Intersection D.955 Yolboyu, Oltu	20	63	162
Erzurum	Intersection P.25-07 to Kömürlü, Yusufeli	9	72	153
Erzurum	Intersection P.25-10 to Sarıkamış; Intersection P.25-14 to Şenkaya	8	80	145
Erzurum	Akşar, Şenkaya	2	82	143
Erzurum	Aydoğdu, Şenkaya	13	95	130
Ardahan	Göle	17	112	113
Ardahan	Intersection P.75-25 to Selim, Kars	3	115	110
Ardahan	Balçeşme, Göle	22	137	88
Kars	Intersection D.965 to Susuz	32	169	56
Kars	Intersection D.965 to Kars	3	172	53
Kars	Intersection D.010 to Arpaçay	10	182	43
Kars	Şahnalar, Akyaka	25	207	18
Kars	Akyaka, Kars	6	213	12
Kars	Demirkent, Akyaka	4	217	8
Kars	Tiknis border crossing	8	225	0
1.000 mi = 1.609 km; 1.000 km = 0.621 mi

== Major intersections ==
- D.010
- D.950
- D.955
- D.965

== See also ==
- Lake Kuyucuk
