= Otoyol 21A =

Motorway in Turkey

O-21A

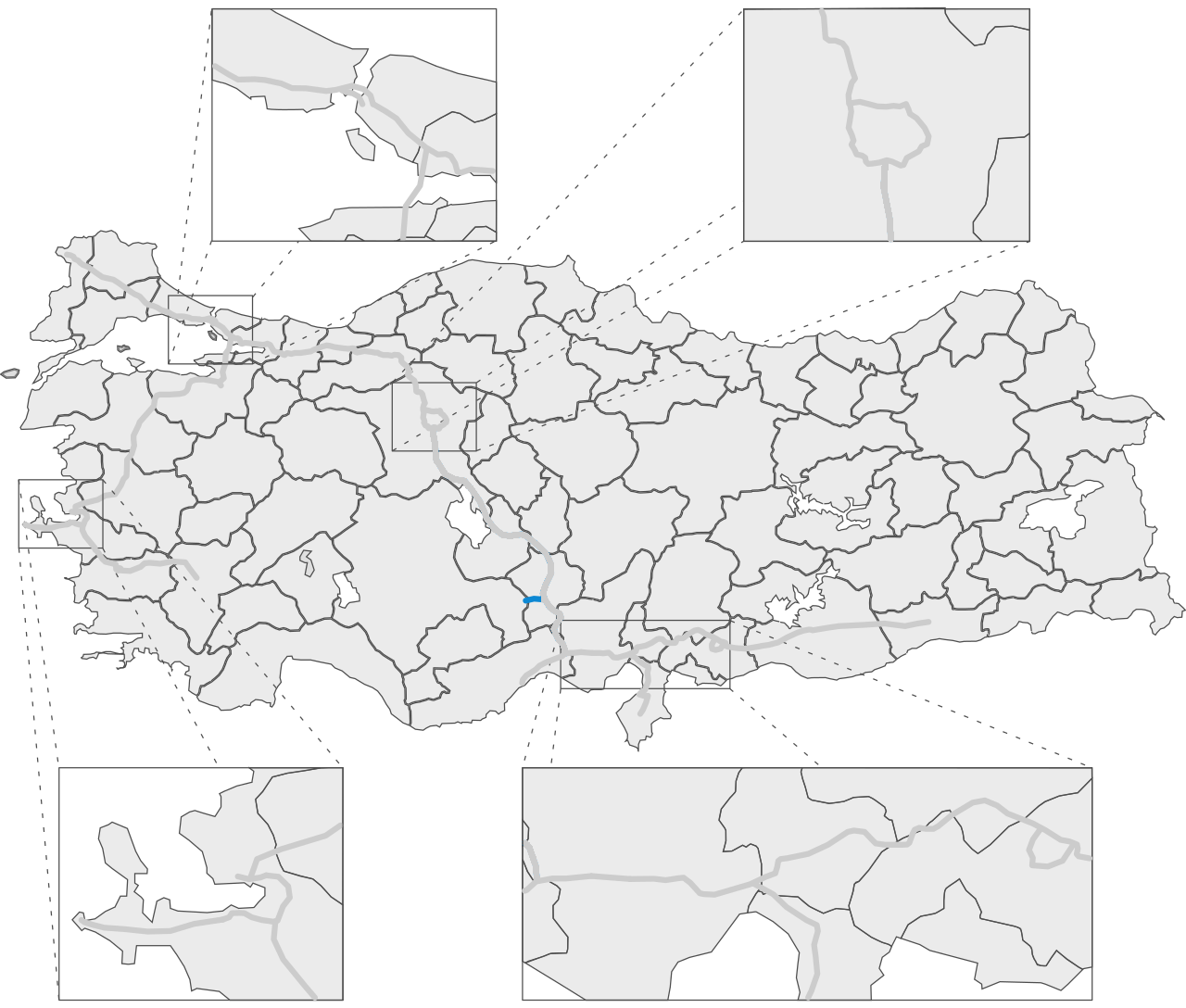

Route information
- Part of E90
- Length: 32 km (20 mi)
- Existed: 1992–present

Major junctions
- West end: D.330 / D.750 near Tepeköy, Konya

- East end: O-21 near Eminlik, Niğde

Location
- Country: Turkey
- Regions: Central Anatolia
- Provinces: Konya, Niğde

Highway system
- Highways in Turkey; Motorways; List; State Highways; List
← O-21	→ O-22

Otoyol 21A, abbreviated as O-21A, is a 32 km (20 mi) long auxiliary otoyol connecting the D.330 and D.750 to the O-21. The motorway was opened in 1992 as a connecting route to Konya and passes through mostly uninhabited rural land. The O-21A is a part of the E90.

The motorway was deemed too short to receive its own O-XX designation, despite being longer than the O-50, but too long to be designated as an exit; therefore, the route was signed as the O-21A, and is the only otoyol route in Turkey to have an alpha-numeric route designation.

== Exit list ==
Province	District	km	mi	Exit	Destination	Notes
Konya	Ereğli	0.0	0.0	-	D.330 — Konya	Continues as the D.330
Konya	Ereğli	0.6	0.4	K153	D.750 — Zonguldak, Tarsus	
Niğde	Ulukışla	17.6	10.9	K152	D.805 — Niğde, Ulukışla	
Niğde	Ulukışla	28.8	17.9	K151	Eminlik	
Niğde	Ulukışla	30.1	18.7	Eminlik Toll Plaza		
Niğde	Ulukışla	32.3	20.1	K15	O-21 — Niğde, Tarsus	

Light blue indicates toll section of motorway.

== See also ==
- List of highways in Turkey
