= State road D.260 (Turkey) =

D.260

Route information
- Length: 977 km (607 mi)

Major junctions
- West end: Afyonkarahisar
- East end: Erzurum

Location
- Country: Turkey

Highway system
- Highways in Turkey; Motorways; List; State Highways; List

D.260 is a 977 km (607 mi) long west–east state road in Turkey running eastwards from Afyonkarahisar in the Aegean Region through Central Anatolia Region to Erzurum, in the Eastern Anatolia region.
