= Ankara–Samsun Motorway =

Motorway in Turkey

Ankara–Samsun Motorway
- Ankara–Samsun Otoyolu

Route information
- Length: 381 km (237 mi)

Major junctions
- From: Mamak, Ankara
- To: Samsun

Location
- Country: Turkey
- Major cities: Ankara, Kırıkkale, Delice, Çorum, Merzifon, Samsun

Highway system
- Highways in Turkey; Motorways; List; State Highways; List

The Ankara–Samsun Motorway is a 381-kilometre (237 mi) motorway partially under construction, consisting of Ankara–Delice and Delice–Samsun sections. Ankara-Delice section of the motorway is currently under construction as of 2025, and Delice-Samsun section is planned to be opened in 2035.

== History ==
The Ministry of Transport and Infrastructure was going to make the tender of motorway via build-operate-transfer model, on 24 July 2022. The “Tender for the Construction, Operation and Transfer of Ankara-Kırıkkale-Delice Motorway Project with Build-Operate-Transfer Model”, which was announced on 15 June and scheduled for 24 August, was postponed to 5 October 2022. But the Ministry of Transport has delayed the tender to 15 December 2022 first, and then to 15 December 2023. The construction protocol for the motorway was signed on 14 October 2024.

== Major intersections ==
=== Ankara–Kırıkkale–Delice section ===
District	km	Type	Destinations	Notes
Mamak	0.0	K1	Mamak O-20 Interchange	O-20 / E88
	1.5		V1 Viaduct	659 m
	5.0		Motorway Service Area	
Mamak	6.0	K2	Mamak (K2) Junction	
	10.0		V2 Viaduct	185 m
	11.9		Pay Toll	
Elmadağ	16.5	K3	Elmadağ Junction	D.200
	21.4		V4 Viaduct	185 m
	23.8		V5 Viaduct	185 m
	24.4		V6 Viaduct	185 m
	33.7		T1 Tunnel	1280 m
	35.4		V7 Viaduct	185 m
	36.9		T2 Tunnel	1255 m
	39.0		V7/A Viaduct	185 m
	39.6		T3 Tunnel	475 m
	40.1		T4 Tunnel	878 m
Yahşihan	45.0	K4	Yahşihan Junction	
	49.2		V8 Viaduct	185 m
Kırıkkale	50.5	K5	Kırıkkale West Junction	D.765
	52.0		Motorway Service Area (B Type)	
Kırıkkale	69.5	K6	Kırıkkale East Junction	D.200
	83.0		Motorway Service Area	
Delice	99.5	K7	Yozgat Interchange	D.200 / E88

=== Delice–Samsun section ===
District	km	Type	Destinations	Notes
Delice	99.5	K7	Yozgat Interchange	D.200 / E88
	123.8		Motorway Service Area	D Type
Sungurlu	138.4	K8	Sungurlu Junction	D.190
	141.7		Motorway Service Area	B Type
Sungurlu	157.4	K9	Boğazkale Junction	D.190
	161.9		Motorway Service Area	D Type
	178.4		Motorway Service Area	B Type
	183.6		Viaduct	900 m
	205.9		Motorway Service Area	D Type
Çorum	210.7	K10	Alaca Junction	D.795
	233.3		Motorway Service Area	A Type
Mecitözü	243.0	K11	Mecitözü Junction	D.180
	257.9		Motorway Service Area	B Type
	273.5		Motorway Service Area	D Type
Merzifon	299.3	K12	Merzifon Junction	D.100 / D.795 / E80
	300.6		Motorway Service Area	B Type
	302.4		Tunnel	6600 m
	309.1		Viaduct	435 m
	309.7		Tunnel	855 m
	310.6		Viaduct	210 m
Havza	313.1	K13	Havza Junction	
	314.5		Viaduct	575 m
	323.2		Motorway Service Area	D Type
	328.6		Viaduct	645m
	335.3		Tunnel	2965 m
	350.1		Motorway Service Area	D Type
	363.3		Tunnel	565 m
	364.3		Tunnel	1935 m
	368.8		Viaduct	210 m
İlkadım	380.5	K14	Samsun Junction	D.010 / E70
