= Otoyol 54 =

Highway in Turkey

O-54
- Gaziantep Çevreyolu

Route information
- Length: 35 km (22 mi)
- Existed: 2013–present

Major junctions
- West end: D.400 in Gaziantep

- East end: O-52 in Gaziantep

Location
- Country: Turkey
- Regions: Southeastern Anatolia
- Provinces: Gaziantep

Highway system
- Highways in Turkey; Motorways; List; State Highways; List

Otoyol 54 (English: Motorway 54), named Gaziantep Beltway (Turkish: Gaziantep Çevreyolu) and abbreviated as O-54, is a 35 km (22 mi) long otoyol in Gaziantep, Turkey. The motorway serves as a beltway around the city of Gaziantep and connects to the O-52, flanking the city from West, South and East. Likewise with other urban motorways in Turkey, it is a toll-free route with the maximum speed for regular cars set at 130 km/h. It serves as a branch of the E90 European highway connecting Gaziantep to Adana and Şanlıurfa and furthermore to Eastern Europe, where the connection lies at the Northeastern edge of the city where D400, E90 and O54 intersect. On its Northwestern edge, the beltway merges with D400 around the western industrial zone, Dülükbaba natural park and Şehirgösteren residential areas of the city. Besides serving as a bypass to connect different edges of the city, the motorway also serves to connect Gaziantep to Kilis and further south, to Syrian Governorate of Aleppo The motorway was opened on 19 January 2013.

== Exit list ==
Province	District	km	mi	Exit	Destination	Notes
Gaziantep	Şehitkamil	0.0	0.0	K1	D.400 — Adana, Antalya	
Gaziantep	Şahinbey	4.8	3.0	K2	Muhsin Yazıcıoğlu Cd.	
Gaziantep	Şahinbey	14.9	9.3	K3	Halep Blv.	
Gaziantep	Şahinbey	20.4	12.7	K4	Özdemir Cd.	
Gaziantep	Şahinbey	25.4	15.8	K5	D.850 — Gaziantep Airport, Kilis	
Gaziantep	Şehitkamil	31.3	19.4	K6	Anafartalar Cd.	
Gaziantep	Şehitkamil	33.6	20.9	K7	D.400 — Şanlıurfa	
Gaziantep	Şehitkamil	34.4	21.4	Gaziantep East Toll Plaza		
Gaziantep	Şehitkamil	35.0	21.7	K8	O-52 — Adana, Şanlıurfa	A.K.A. E90

Light blue indicates toll section of motorway.

== See also ==
- List of highways in Turkey
