= Otoyol 7 =

Toll motorway in Istanbul

O-7
- Northern Marmara Motorway; Northern Beltway; Third Beltway; Kuzey Marmara Otoyolu; Kuzey Çevreyolu; Üçüncü Çevreyolu

Route information
- Length: 462.7 km (287.5 mi)
- Existed: 2021–present

Major junctions
- From: O-3 "Kınalı K10" junction in Silivri

- O-2 in Çekmeköy; O-4 in Sultanbeyli; O-5 in Gebze

- To: O-4 in Akyazı

Location
- Country: Turkey
- Regions: Marmara
- Provinces: Istanbul Province, Kocaeli Province, Sakarya Province
- Major cities: Silivri, Istanbul, Gebze, İzmit, Adapazarı, Akyazı

Highway system
- Highways in Turkey; Motorways; List; State Highways; List
← O-6	→ O-20

The Otoyol 7 (O-7; English: Motorway 7), or Northern Marmara Motorway (Turkish: Kuzey Marmara Otoyolu), is a toll motorway in Turkey that bypasses Istanbul to the north. The motorway is 248 km in length between the Kınalı junction and the Akyazı junction, and is 8 lanes wide (4+4 lanes).Within the scope of the Build-Operate-Transfer Model Construction, Operation and Transfer of Kınalı-Odayeri (Including Connection Roads) Section (North Marmara Europan Motorway) and Kurtköy-Akyazı (Including Connection Roads) Section (North Marmara Anatolian Motorway) of the Northern Marmara Motorway (Including the 3rd Bosphorus Bridge) Project, it is composed of two separate authorized companies, namely "AVRUPA OTOYOLU YATIRIM VE İŞLETME AŞ". on the European side and "KMO ANADOLU OTOYOLU İŞLETME AŞ". on the Asian side.

The completed section of highway crosses the Bosphorus Strait via the Yavuz Sultan Selim Bridge, which was opened in August 2016. The route is intended to serve as the outermost beltway of Istanbul as well as being the third road crossing of the Bosphorus. The route stretches 250 km (160 mi) from Silivri, on the European side, to Akyazı on the Asian side. Connections to the O-4 as well as both the Bosphorus and Fatih Sultan Mehmet bridges will be built as the Northern Marmara Motorway and will bypass Istanbul to the north.

Up to 2016, the only section under construction was the 56 km (35 mi) section from Odayeri to Paşaköy. In this section, 14 tunnels, 61 viaducts, 45 underpasses, and 63 overpasses will be constructed.

The western (Silivri-Odayeri) and eastern (Kurtköy-Akyazı) sections were tendered in early May 2016. Construction was then estimated to take three years and to start in 2016. The section of motorway south of O-3 was constructed in 1987 and was listed as a connector of the O-3 until 2016. The T1 and T2 tunnels on this highway were the location for the world's longest flight through a tunnel

== Exit list ==
=== Main route ===
Province	District	km	mi	Exit	Destination	Notes
Istanbul	Silivri (Kınalı)	0.00	0.00	K10	E80--Istanbul/Edirne (Kınalı junction)	E80 route
Istanbul	Silivri	10.10	6.26	K2	North Marmara Europan Motorway "Silivri" junction	E80 route
Istanbul	Çatalca	19.00	11.81		Çatalca Service Area	
Istanbul	Çatalca	20.37	12.66		Çatalca KMO - T1 Tunnel	
Istanbul	Çatalca	22.45	13.95		Çatalca KMO - T2 Tunnel	
Istanbul	Çatalca	25.8	15.6	K3	North Marmara Europan Motorway "Çatalca" junction→	
Istanbul	Çatalca (Nakkaş)	32.4	21.40	K4	North Marmara Europan Motorway "Nakkaş" junction	E80 route
Istanbul	Arnavutköy	37.50	23.30		Yassıören Service Area	
Istanbul	Arnavutköy	41.60	25.85	K5	North Marmara Europan Motorway "Yassıören" junction	E80 route
Istanbul	Arnavutköy	48.28	30	K6	North Marmara Europan Motorway "Tayakadın" junction	E80 route
Istanbul	Arnavutköy	51.00	31.69		Tayakadın Service Area	
Istanbul	Arnavutköy	54.13	33.64	K7	North Marmara Europan Motorway "Terminal2" Junction→Istanbul Airport	E80 route
Istanbul	Arnavutköy	56.52	35.12	K8	North Marmara Europan Motorway "Terminal1" Junction→Istanbul Airport	E80 route
Istanbul	Arnavutköy	58.21	36.17	K9	North Marmara Europan Motorway "Kargo" Junction→Istanbul Airport	E80 route
Istanbul	Eyüpsultan	61.00	37.90	K10	North Marmara European Motorway "Odayeri" Junction→Northern Beltway	Connects to Northern Beltway,İstanbul Third Beltway
Istanbul	Eyüpsultan	64.40	40.02		Odayeri Service Area	
Istanbul	Sarıyer	77.00	47.85	K11	Northern Motorway "Uskumruköy" junction	E80 route
Istanbul	Sarıyer–Beykoz	85.00	52.82		Yavuz Sultan Selim Bridge	E80 route
Istanbul	Beykoz	93.00	57.79	K12	Northern Motorway "Riva" junction	E80 route
Istanbul	Beykoz	101.00	62.76		Riva Tunnel	
Istanbul	Çekmeköy	105.00	65.25	K13	Northern Motorway "Hüseyinli" Junction	E80 route
Istanbul	Çekmeköy	107.00	66.49		Reşadiye Service Area	
Istanbul	Çekmeköy	113.00	70.22	K14	Northern Motorway "Reşadiye" junction O-2/O-7 Connector	E80 route
Istanbul	Sancaktepe	115.5	71	K15	Northern Motorway "Alemdağ" Junction→-Pendik, Şile	E80 route
Istanbul	Sancaktepe	117.9	71.46	K16	Northern Motorway "Paşaköy" junction	E80 route
Istanbul	Pendik	124.8	77.67	K17	Northern Motorway "Mecidiye" junction O-4/O-7 Connector	Connects to Sabiha Gökçen Airport
Istanbul	Tuzla	135.2	85.29	K18	North Marmara Anatolian Motorway "Istanbul Park" junction	E80 route
Istanbul	Tuzla	137.6	86.48		Istanbul Park Service Area	
Kocaeli	Gebze	140.2	88.40	K19	North Marmara Anatolian Motorway "Gebze OSB" junction	
Kocaeli	Gebze	146.70	91.16		Mollafenari Service Area	
Kocaeli	Gebze	148.50	93.52	K20	North Marmara Anatolian Motorway "Liman" junction connects to and	connects E80 to E881
Kocaeli	Körfez	163.65	101.69		Sevindikli Service Area	
Kocaeli	Körfez	166.2	105.25	K21	North Marmara Anatolian Motorway "Sevindikli" junction	
Kocaeli	Derince	178.15	110.70		Kocaeli KMO - T1 Tunnel	
Kocaeli	Derince	183.20	113.84		Kocaeli KMO - T2 Tunnel	
Kocaeli	İzmit	185.50	115.27		Kocaeli KMO - T3 Tunnel	
Kocaeli	İzmit	185.90	115.52		Kocaeli KMO - T4 Tunnel	
Kocaeli	İzmit	189.06	115.48		Kocaeli KMO - T5 Tunnel	
Kocaeli	İzmit	190.70	121.05	K24	North Marmara Anatolian Motorway "İzmit" junction →İzmit	
Kocaeli	İzmit	198.00	123.03		İzmit Service Area	
Kocaeli	İzmit	193.0	132.25	K25	North Marmara Anatolian Motorway "TEM İzmit" junction connect to	
Kocaeli	İzmit	218.00	135.46		Akmeşe Service Area	
Kocaeli	İzmit	210.8	139.07	K26	North Marmara Anatolian Motorway "Akmeşe" junction	
Sakarya	Adapazarı	221.4	144.06	K27	North Marmara Anatolian Motorway "Adapazarı" junction→	
Sakarya	Adapazarı	229.4	144.06	K28	North Marmara Anatolian Motorway "Karasu" junction→	
Sakarya	Akyazı	240.9	144.06	K29	North Marmara Anatolian Motorway "D100 Akyazı" junction→	
Sakarya	Akyazı	248.7	145.62	K30	North Marmara Anatolian Motorway "TEM Akyazı" junction connect to -Ankara, Istanbul	E80 route
1.000 mi = 1.609 km; 1.000 km = 0.621 mi: Tolled

=== Northern Beltway route ===
Province	District	km	mi	Exit	Destinations	Notes
Istanbul	Bağcılar	0.0	0.0	K19	O-3 "Mahmutbey Batı" junction	west beginning of Northern Beltway
Istanbul	Başakşehir	0.2	0.12	K36	Northern Beltway "İstoç TEM" junction	Northern Beltway or İstanbul Third Beltway
Istanbul	Başakşehir	0.8	0.50	K35	Northern Beltway "İstoç OSB" junction	
Istanbul	Başakşehir	2.0	1.2	K34	Northern Beltway "İkitelli OSB" junction	
Istanbul	Başakşehir	4.4	2.7	K33	Northern Beltway "Başakşehir Merkez" junction	
Istanbul	Başakşehir	5.8	3.6	K32	Northern Beltway "Başakşehir" junction	European side 3rd Beltway and 2nd Beltway connection road
Istanbul	Arnavutköy	8.5	5.3	K31	Northern Beltway "Fenertepe" junction	
Istanbul	Eyüpsultan	17.6	10.9	K30	Northern Beltway "Işıklar" junction	
Istanbul	Eyüpsultan	20.4	12.7	K10	Northern Beltway "Odayeri" junction	E80 O-7 route
Istanbul	Sarıyer	36.0	22.4	K11	Northern Beltway "Uskumruköy" junction	E80 O-7 route
Istanbul	Bosphorus	43.8	27.2	Yavuz Sultan Selim Bridge		
Istanbul	Beykoz	51.9	32.2	K12	Northern Beltway "Riva" junction	E80 O-7 route
Istanbul	Çekmeköy	64.5	40.1	K13	Northern Beltway "Hüseyinli" junction	E80 O-7 route
Istanbul	Çekmeköy	71.9	44.7	K14	Northern Beltway "Reşadiye" junction	Anatolian side 3rd Beltway and 2nd Beltway connection road
Istanbul	Sancaktepe	74.4	46.2	K15	Northern Beltway "Alemdağ" junction	E80 O-7 route
Istanbul	Sancaktepe	76.8	47.7	K16	Northern Beltway "Paşaköy" junction	E80 O-7 route
Istanbul	Pendik	83.7	52.0	K17	Northern Beltway "Mecidiye" junction	E80 O-7 route
Istanbul	Sultanbeyli	86.5	53.7	K3-1	O-4 "Mecidiye 1" junction	east end of Northern Beltway
1.000 mi = 1.609 km; 1.000 km = 0.621 mi: Tolled

== Notable accidents ==
- 28 December 2023 — At least 10 people were killed and 61 others injured in a multiple-vehicle collision in Sakarya Province, Turkey.
