= State road D.850 (Turkey) =

Road in Turkey

D.850

Route information
- Length: 852 km (529 mi)

Major junctions
- North end: Ünye (Black Sea coast)
- South end: Öncüpınar (Syrian border)

Location
- Country: Turkey

Highway system
- Highways in Turkey; Motorways; List; State Highways; List

D.850 is a north-to-south state road in Turkey. It starts at Ünye at the Black Sea coast and ends at Öncüpınar, which hosts a Turkish border check point with Syria. Since it runs all the way from north to south, it crosses the three main west-to-east highways, namely the D.100, D.300 and D.400.

== Itinerary ==
Province	Location	Distance from Ünye (km)	Distance from Ünye (mile)	Distance from Öncüpınar (km)	Distance from Öncüpınar (mile)
Ordu	Ünye	0	0	852	529
Tokat
Tokat	Niksar	107	66	745	463
Tokat	Tokat	161	100	691	429
Sivas
Sivas	Yıldızeli	222	138	630	391
Sivas	Sivas	263	163	589	366
Sivas	Gürün	405	252	447	278
Malatya
Malatya	Darende	441	271	411	255
Malatya	Malatya	532	331	320	199
Adıyaman
Adıyaman	Gölbaşı	632	393	220	137
Adıyaman	Besni	675	419	177	110
Gaziantep
Gaziantep	Araban	714	444	138	86
Gaziantep	Gaziantep	779	484	73	45
Kilis
Kilis	Kilis	884	524	8	5
Kilis	Öncüpınar	852	529	0	0
