= Otoyol 22 =

O-22
- Bursa-Sivrihisar Otoyolu

Route information
- Part of E90
- Length: 34 km (21 mi)
- Existed: 2005–present

Major junctions
- From: O-5 in Bursa

- To: D.200 in Yenişehir

Location
- Country: Turkey
- Regions: Marmara
- Provinces: Bursa

Highway system
- Highways in Turkey; Motorways; List; State Highways; List
← O-21A	→ O-30

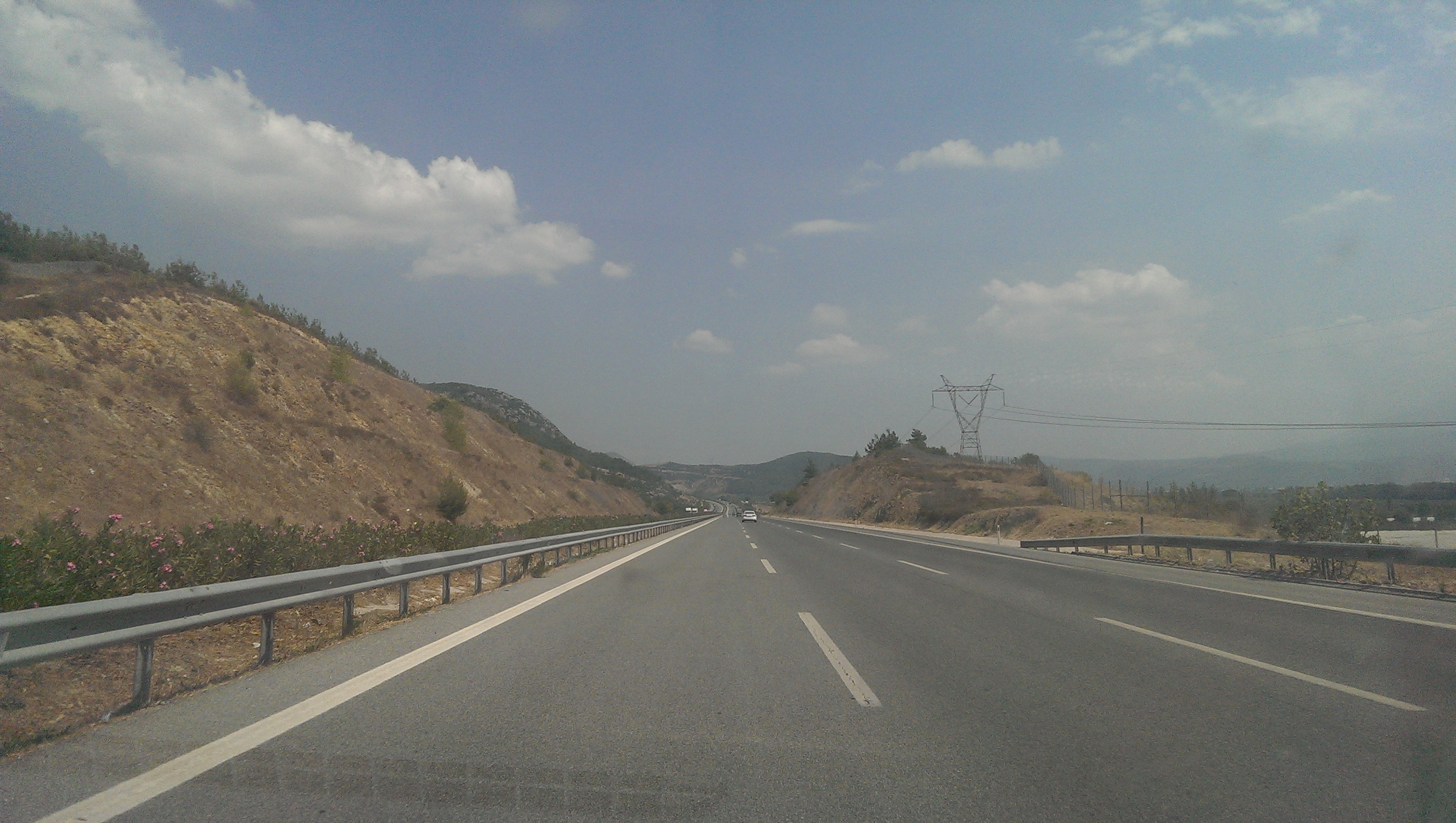
Otoyol 22

Otoyol 22 (English: Motorway 22), abbreviated as O-22 and also known as Bursa–Sivrihisar Otoyolu (English: Bursa–Sivrihisar Motorway), is a partly completed motorway in Turkey that will connect Bursa and Ankara in the future. The motorway starts at the Çağlayan intersection (O-5) and currently ends near Yenişehir at the State road D200.

The remaining section will connect Yenişehir with Sivrihisar via Bozüyük and Eskişehir. The project includes two tunnels (670m and 3570m), 26 viaducts (all together 13620 m) and 10 intersections. After its completion, the motorway will have a length of about 240 kilometres.

== Exit List ==
Province	District	km	mi	Exit	Destination	Notes
Bursa	Osmangazi	0	0	K7 (North)	O-5 — Gebze, Istanbul	Toll motorway
Bursa	Osmangazi	0	0	K7 (South)	O-5 — İzmir	Bursa beltway, tolled starting from west end
Bursa	Osmangazi	1.8	1.1	K14	D.575 — Bursa, Yalova	
Bursa	Osmangazi	11.1	6.9	K13	Samanlı Avenue — Yıldırım	
Bursa	Gürsu	19.3	11.2	İğdir Tunnel		
Bursa	Gürsu	19.8	12.3	İğdir Tunnel		
Bursa	Kestel	27.9	17.3	K12	D.200 — Bursa	
Bursa	Kestel	34	21.1	K11	D.200 — İnegöl, Bozüyük, Eskişehir, Ankara / D.160 — Yenişehir, Bilecik	

== See also ==
- List of highways in Turkey
