= State road D.950 (Turkey) =

Road in Turkey

D.950

Route information
- Length: 717 km (446 mi)

Major junctions
- North end: Hopa
- South end: Syrian border

Location
- Country: Turkey

Highway system
- Highways in Turkey; Motorways; List; State Highways; List

D.950 is a north-to-south state road in east Turkey. The 717 km (446 mi) road starts at Hopa at the Black Sea coast and ends at the Syrian border. It crosses many state roads, including the D.100, D.300 and D.400.

== Itinerary ==
Province	Location	Distance from Hopa (km)	Distance from Hopa (mile)	Distance from Şenyurt (Syrian border) (km)	Distance from Şenyurt (Syrian border) (mile)
Artvin
Artvin	Hopa	0	0	717	446
Artvin	Borçka	36	22	681	423
Artvin	Artvin	63	39	654	406
Erzurum
Erzurum	Tortum	206	138	511	317
Erzurum	Erzurum	263	163	454	282
Erzurum	Çat	320	199	397	247
Bingöl
Bingöl	Karlıova	380	236	337	209
Bingöl	Bingöl	450	280	267	166
Bingöl	Genç	470	292	247	153
Diyarbakır
Diyarbakır	Diyarbakır	594	369	123	76
Diyarbakır	Çınar	626	389	91	57
Mardin
Mardin	Mardin	684	425	33	21
Mardin	Kızıltepe	704	437	13	8
Mardin	Şenyurt (Syrian border check point)	717	446	0	0
