= Otoyol =

National network of controlled-access highways in Turkey

- Route markers for three Turkish Motorways

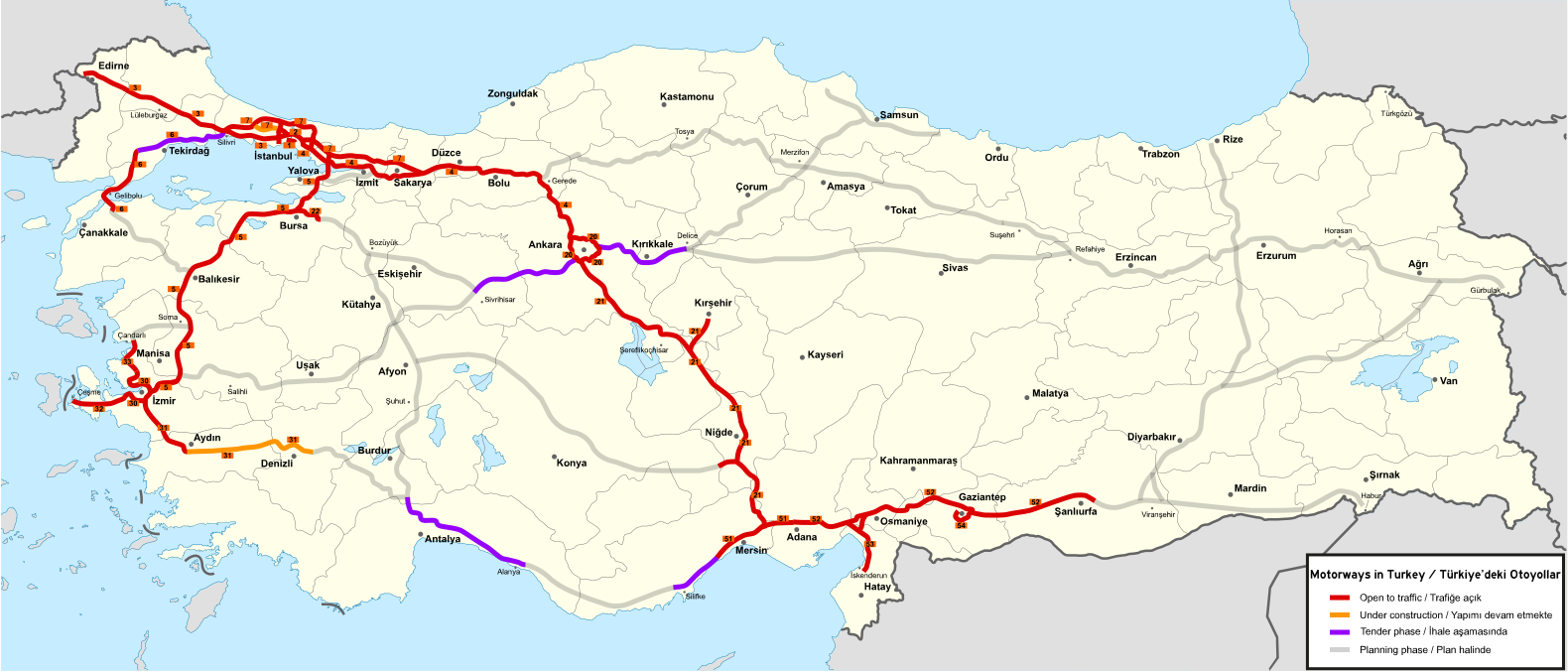
- Otoyol network in Turkey as of February 2022. Motorways in use, under construction and projected.

System information
- Maintained by Karayolları Genel Müdürlüğü
- Formed: 1968

Highway names
- Otoyols: Otoyol XX (O-XX)

System links
- Highways in Turkey; Motorways; List; State Highways; List

The otoyol (plural: otoyollar) is a road in the national network of controlled-access highways in Turkey. The Turkish word otoyol translates to "motorway", while its literal meaning is "auto-route". The first otoyol was opened in 1973.

As of December 2026, there were 3,848 kilometres (2,391 miles) of otoyols in service, on a network passes through 28 out of 81 provinces in Turkey.

The system previously consisted of three separate networks; the Edirne–Istanbul–Ankara corridor, the Aegean network centred on İzmir and the Southeastern network centred on Adana. With the completion of the O-5 in 2019 and the extension of the O-21 in 2020, these three networks were connected. Older routes were built solely with state funds, while newer routes and routes under construction were developed through the build–operate–transfer (BOT; yap–işlet–devret) model, where private companies build and operate the highway for a specified period before transferring ownership to the state. This allows for private investment in highway infrastructure to support expansion and maintenance without immediate public expenditure. The network is expected to expand to 8,325 kilometres (5,173 mi) by 2053. The minimum speed limit on Turkish otoyols is 40 km/h (25 mph) while the maximum speed is 140 km/h (87 mph).

== History ==
The construction of a national road system was prioritized in 1948, where the construction of new roads were greatly accelerated. This led to a rise in automobile usage in Turkey. By the 1960s, traffic problems were becoming prevalent in large cities and capacity on intercity roads needed to be upgraded. Plans to build new expressways were put into action in 1968, when construction of the Istanbul Inner Beltway was started. The Beltway, known as the O-1, was opened together with the Bosporus Bridge in 1973 with great fanfare. This became the first motorway to be built in Turkey. The Istanbul Beltway was then to be a part of a large expressway spanning from Edirne, in East Thrace, to İskenderun, on the eastern shore of the Mediterranean Sea. Construction of this expressway first started in 1973 on a 14 km (8.7 mi) section between Pozantı and Akçatekir, on what would become the O-21. In 1975 construction of a 40 km (25 mi) section of the motorway from Gebze to Izmit was started. Due to financial problems during the following years, construction of the two otoyols were greatly slowed down. It wasn't until 1984 that these two motorways were opened to traffic.

Turgut Özal became Prime Minister in 1983 and brought forth a policy of constructing new otoyols in Turkey. In 1985, construction of an intercontinental motorway spanning 772 km (480 mi) from Edirne to Ankara was started. This motorway project would serve as an outer beltway round Istanbul and also included the construction of a second bridge over the Bosporus, the Fatih Sultan Mehmet Bridge. The first section of the motorway, the 20 km (12 mi) long Edirne Beltway, was opened in 1987, followed by the opening of the Outer Beltway in Istanbul, from Levent to Kozyatağı, together with the FSM Bridge on 3 July 1988. The motorway was opened in sections in the following years until being completed in 1994. 2 decades later O-7 or Third Beltway opened in 2017.

In 1988 the construction of three new motorways in İzmir were started. O-32 opened in 1992 and it became first motorway in Agean Region. O-30 was built a year after. And a year after O-31 was opened, running between İzmir and Aydın. Finally in 2008, O-30 was completed. First section of O-5 was opened between Kemalpaşa and Bornova, after that in 2019 the motorway opened by phases section between Balıkesir junctions opened in 2018 and Kemalpaşa and Akhisar section was opened in March 2019 and in August 2019 remaining sections opened between Akhisar and Balıkesir West, Balıkesir North and Bursa West junctions. In 2020 two new motorways opened to the traffic. O-33 was opened in February 2020, as a continuous part of O-30, and in November 2020 the first section of O-21 extension was opened and in December 2020 was fully opened to Niğde. In 2021 the 8th phase of O-7 opened, and on 18 March 2022 Otoyol-6 opened between Malkara and Lapseki. Including the 1915 Çanakkale Bridge.

Today, two motorway extensions under construction: In O-7 9th phase between Nakkaş-Başakşehir link road and O-31 extension to Denizli, opening in 2023.

== Network map ==
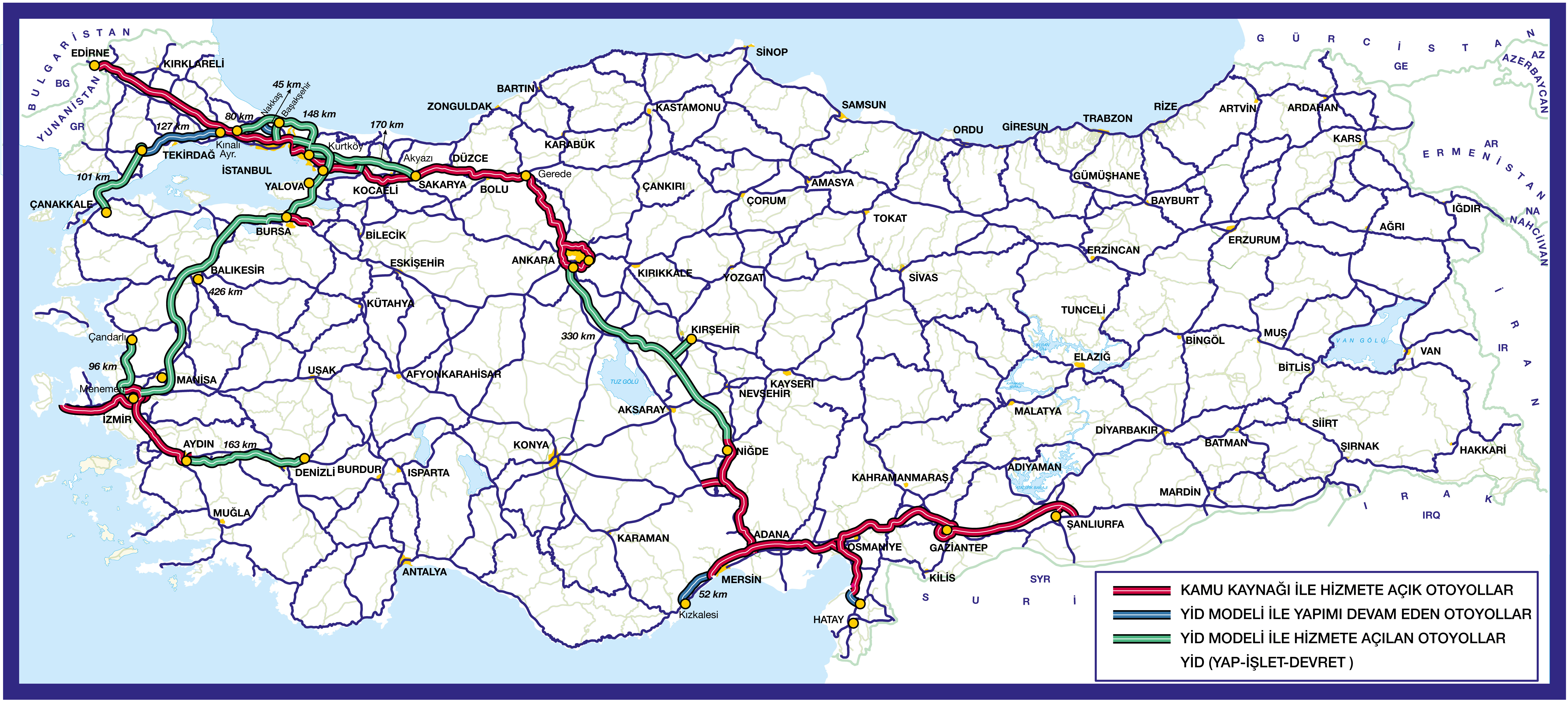
Otoyols in Turkey as of 1 October 2024: motorways are marked with double lines; completed motorways are in red; build–operate–transfer routes are in green; routes under construction as of 2024 (also BOT) are in blue

Interactive map of highways of Turkey

== List of Otoyol routes ==
Number	Length (km)	Length (mi)	Northern or western terminus	Southern or eastern terminus	Opened	Notes
O-1	24.8	15.4	in Bakırköy, Istanbul	Bağdat Ave. in Kadıköy, Istanbul	1970 - 1973	Istanbul Inner Beltway including the Bosphorus Bridge
O-2	36.9	22.9	O-3 in Mahmutbey, Istanbul	in Kozyatağı, Istanbul	1986 -1988	Istanbul Outer Beltway including the Fatih Sultan Mehmet Bridge
O-3	246.9	153.4	near Edirne	in Eyüp, Istanbul	1987	İstanbul-Edirne (Bulgaria-Greece-Turkey border) Motorway
O-4	372	231.2	O-2/O1-O2 connector in Ataşehir, Istanbul	O-20 near Sincan, Ankara	1984 - 2007	İstanbul-Ankara Motorway, including the Mount Bolu Tunnel
O-5	409.4	254.4	O-4 near Gebze, Kocaeli	O-30 in Bornova, İzmir	2016 - 2019	İstanbul-Bursa-İzmir Motorway, including the Osmangazi Bridge and the Orhangazi Tunnel
O-6	101	62.8	near Malkara, Tekirdağ	near Lapseki, Çanakkale	2022	The section containing the Çanakkale 1915 Bridge was opened in March 2022
O-7	275.2	171.1	O-3 near Kınalı, Istanbul	O-4 near Akyazı, Sakarya	2016 - 2020	Northern Marmara Motorway, Contains the northernmost beltway of İstanbul, including the Yavuz Sultan Selim Bridge
O-20	110	68.4	Road forms complete ring around Ankara	Road forms complete ring around Ankara	1987	Ankara Beltway
O-21	399.5	248.3	O-20 near Gölbaşı, Ankara	near Tarsus, Mersin	1984 - 2020	Ankara-Çukurova Motorway
O-21	32	19.9	near Çakmak Bucağı, Konya	O-21 near Eminlik, Niğde	1992	
O-22	34.1	21.2	O-5 near Çağlıyan, Bursa	near Turanköy, Bursa	2006	
O-30	60.4	37.5	O-32 in Balçova, İzmir	O-33 in Çiğli, İzmir	1993 - 2006	İzmir Beltway
O-31	293	182	O-30 in Buca, İzmir	in Pınarkent, Denizli	1996–2024	İzmir-Aydın-Denizli Motorway
O-32	77.7	48.3	1065 Sk. in Çeşme	Mustafa Kemal Sahil Blv. in Balçova, İzmir	1992 - 1996	İzmir-Çeşme Motorway
O-33	55.2	34.3	Çandarlı Connector near Çandarlı	O-30 in Çiğli, İzmir	2019	Northern Aegean Motorway
O-51	151.2	93.9	in Kızkalesi, Mersin	O-52 in Adana	1992 - 2026	Adana-Mersin Motorway
O-52	365	226.8	O-51 in Adana	near Şanlıurfa	1992	Adana-Gaziantep-Şanlıurfa Motorway
O-53	150	93.2	O-52 near Ceyhan	in İskenderun	1993	
O-54	35	21.7	in Gaziantep	O-52 in Gaziantep	2013	Gaziantep Beltway

== Future Projects ==
The motorway network is expected to reach 8,325 kilometres (5,172 mi) by 2053. Future projects can be seen in the chart below:

=== Under Construction ===
Number	Length (km)	Length (mi)	Northern or western terminus	Southern or eastern terminus	Opens	Notes
O-7	45	28	O-7 near Nakkaş, Istanbul	O-7 near Başakşehir, Istanbul	2027	
O-6	127	78.9	near Malkara, Tekirdağ	O-3 near Kınalı, Istanbul	2027	Part of Kınalı-Balıkesir Motorway
O-20	120	74.6	O-20 in Mamak, Ankara	in Delice, Kırıkkale	2027	Part of Ankara-Samsun Motorway. Delice-Samsun section still in planning phase.
O-51	122	75.8	in Antalya	in Alanya	2027	Part of Afyon–Antalya–Alanya Motorway. Afyonkarahisar-Burdur-Antalya section still in planning phase.
O-53	19.2	11.9	O-53 near İskenderun, Hatay	near Topboğazı, Hatay	2028	İskenderun-Antakya Motorway
	31.3	19.5	O-53 near Dörtyol, Hatay	near Hassa, Hatay	2030	Dörtyol-Hassa Motorway

=== Tender Phase ===
Number	Length (km)	Length (mi)	Northern or western terminus	Southern or eastern terminus	Tender Date	Notes
O-51	30	18.1	in Taşucu	O-51 near Kızkalesi, Mersin	N/A	
	41	25.5	O-33 near Menemen, İzmir	O-30 near Buca, İzmir	N/A	İzmir 2. peripheral motorway
	89	55.3	O-21 near Pozantı, Adana	O-52 near Ceyhan, Adana	N/A	Adana peripheral motorway
	12	7.46	O-30 near Sasalı, İzmir	O-30 near İnciraltı, İzmir	N/A	İZKARAY - Gulf of İzmir Passage Project between Çiğli (Sasalı) and Balçova (İnciraltı); including one undersea tunnel and one bridge
O-31	155	96.3	O-31 in Denizli	near Bucak, Burdur	N/A	Denizli-Burdur section of Aydın-Denizli-Burdur Motorway
	91	56.6	O-5 near Yalova	O-4 near İzmit, Kocaeli	N/A	Yalova-İzmit Motorway
O-52	454	282.1	O-52 near Şanlıurfa	near Habur, Silopi, Şırnak	N/A	Şanlıurfa-Mardin-Habur Motorway (including link to Diyarbakır) (border crossing)

=== Planning Phase ===
Number	Length (km)	Length (mi)	Northern or western terminus	Southern or eastern terminus	Tender Date	Notes
	130	80.8	O-22 in Sivrihisar	O-20 in Tulumtaş, Ankara	N/A	Part of İzmir–Ankara Motorway. İzmir-Sivrihisar section still in planning phase.
O-51	276	171.5	O-7 near Akyazı, Sakarya	O-20 near Sincan, Ankara	N/A	Central Anatolian Motorway
	137	85.2	O-4 in Gerede	in Ilgaz	N/A	Part of Gerede-Gürbulak Motorway. Ilgaz-Merzifon-Koyulhisar-Pülümür-Horasan-Gürbulak sections still in planning phase.
O-6	137	85.1	near Lapseki, Çanakkale	O-5 near Balıkesir	N/A	Lapseki-Balıkesir section of Kınalı-Balıkesir Motorway
	350	217.5	} near Afyonkarahisar	near Antalya	N/A	Afyonkarahisar-Burdur-Antalya Motorway
	408	253.5	O-5 near Turgutlu, Manisa	O-22 near Sivrihisar	N/A	Sivrihisar-İzmir section of Ankara-İzmir Motorway
O-22	231	143.5	O-5 near Kestel, Bursa	O-22 near Sivrihisar, Eskişehir	N/A	Sivrihisar-Bursa Motorway
	303	188.3	near Samsun	near Delice	N/A	Delice-Samsun section of Ankara-Samsun Motorway
	144	89.5	near Bafra, Samsun	near Ünye, Ordu	N/A	Bafra-Samsun-Ünye Motorway
	183	113.7	near Ilgaz, Çankırı	near Merzifon, Amasya	N/A	Ilgaz-Merzifon Motorway
	919	571	near Merzifon, Amasya	near Gürbulak, Doğubayazıt, Ağrı	N/A	Merzifon-Gürbulak Motorway (border crossing)
	440	273.4	near Afyonkarahisar	near Ulukışla, Niğde	N/A	Afyonkarahisar-Konya-Ereğli-Niğde (Ulukışla) Motorway
	105	65.3	near Bozüyük, Bilecik	near Afyonkarahisar	N/A	Bozüyük-Afyonkarahisar Motorway
O-51	200	124.3	near Alanya, Antalya	near Silifke, Mersin	N/A	Alanya-Silifke Motorway
	105	65.3	O-4 near Düzce	near Zonguldak	N/A	Düzce-Zonguldak Motorway
	500	310.7	near Delice	near Refahiye, Erzincan	N/A	Delice-Sivas-Refahiye Motorway
	600	372.8	O-21 near Nevşehir	near Diyarbakır	N/A	Nevşehir-Kayseri-Malatya-Diyarbakır Motorway
	220	136.7	near Sivas	near Malatya	N/A	Sivas-Malatya Motorway
	50	31.1	O-52 near Şanlıurfa	near Akçakale, Şanlıurfa	N/A	Şanlıurfa-Akçakale Motorway (border crossing)
	475	295.2	near Diyarbakır	near Gürbulak, Doğubayazıt, Ağrı	N/A	Diyarbakır-Gürbulak Motorway (border crossing)
	540	335.6	near Trabzon	near Kahramanmaraş	N/A	Trabzon-Refahiye-Malatya-Kahramanmaraş Motorway
	250	155.4	near Pasinler, Erzurum	near Türkgözü, Posof, Ardahan	N/A	Pasinler-Türkgözü Motorway (border crossing)
	460	285.8	near Rize	near Diyarbakır	N/A	Rize-Erzurum-Diyarbakır Motorway
O-53	78	48.5	O-53 near Topboğazı, Hatay	near Cilvegözü, Reyhanlı, Hatay	N/A	Topboğazı-Cilvegözü Motorway (border crossing)
O-33	80	49.7	O-33 near Çandarlı, Dikili, İzmir	O-5 near Savaştepe, Balıkesir	N/A	Çandarlı-Bergama-Savaştepe Motorway
	90	55.9	O-31 near Aydın	near Muğla	N/A	Aydın-Muğla Motorway
	75	46.6	near İpsala, Edirne	near Malkara, Tekirdağ	N/A	Malkara-İpsala Motorway (border crossing)
	130	80.8	O-3 near Havsa, Edirne	near Kavakköy, Gelibolu, Çanakkale	N/A	Havsa-Gelibolu Motorway
	180	111.9	near Lapseki, Çanakkale	O-5 near Karacabey, Bursa	N/A	Lapseki-Karacabey Motorway

== Toll ==
Most motorways are toll roads. The toll is based on the distance traveled. On most sections, the toll can be paid only with RFID-based HGS. Cash, OGS (active RFID) and KGS (card) methods have been abolished in recent years. Only the newly opened Otoyol 5, and Otoyol 7 have sections where it is possible to pay by cash or with credit card. Apart from motorways, the other state roads in Turkey are free of charge.

The revenue from tolls in 2001 were still about $203 million, rising by 2012 to approximately $542 million. In 2012, the Bosphorus bridges saw 150 million vehicles pass and the other toll roads saw over 210 million vehicles. In 2015, both bridges were used by 141 million vehicles while the other toll motorways were used by 271 million vehicles, generating a total revenue of $391 million (both bridges and motorways combined).

== Standards ==
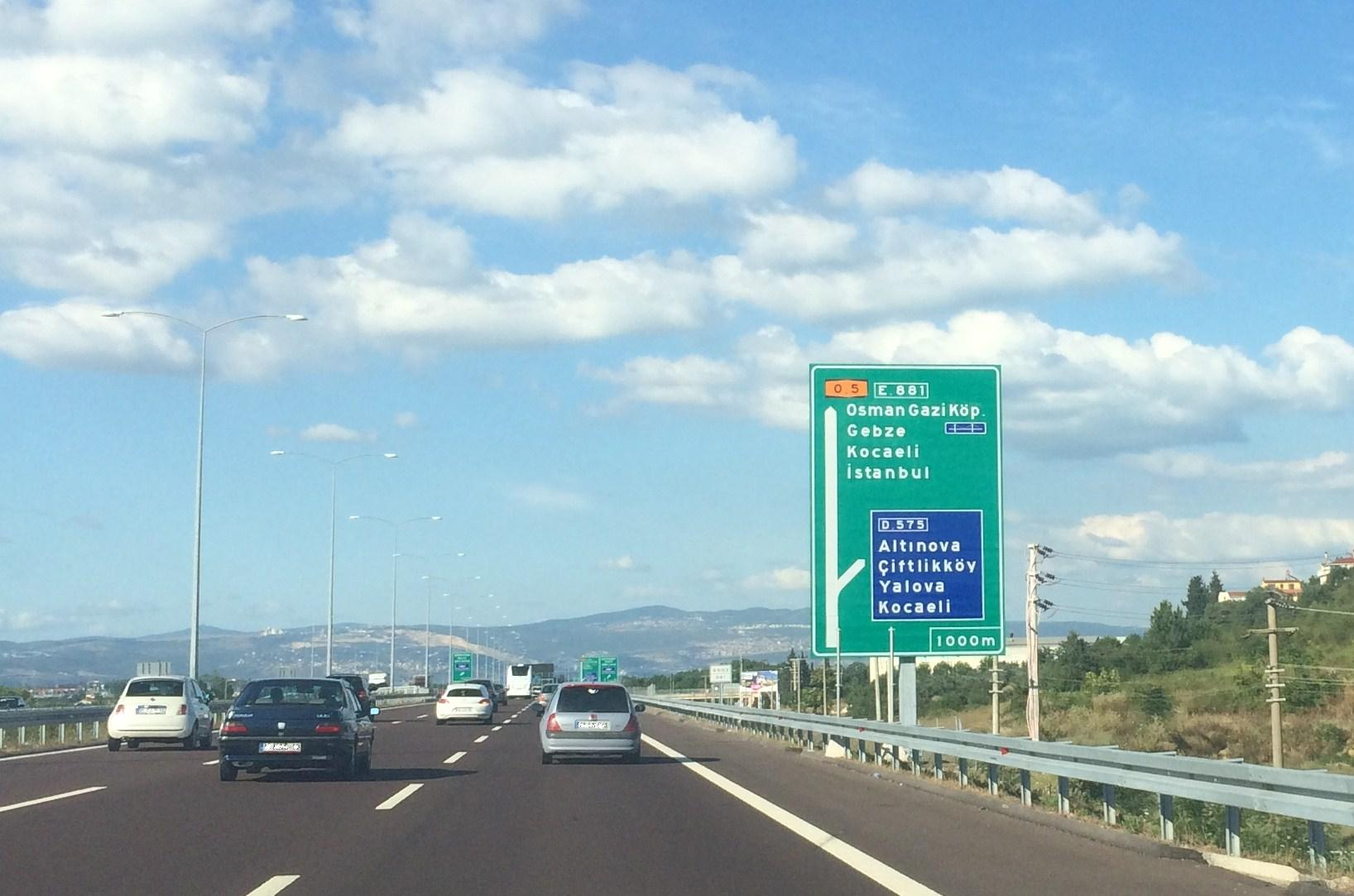
Otoyol 5 near Altınova exit

Mainly because the country already has a wide network of double carriageways, the standards for motorways in comparison are very high. Most sections of otoyols have 3 lanes in each direction, aside from the O-4 around Izmit, a small stretch of the O-3 between Silivri and Esenyurt, and the section of O-32 between Alaçatı and Çeşme, which only have two lanes in each direction. Also the O-2, the O-7 and the O-20 all have four lanes in each direction along the entire route. The lanes are each 3.75 meters wide. Most exits have a connection road, which helps avoiding wrong-way driving and illegal access to the road (bikes, tractors and horses are not allowed on otoyols).

The minimum speed is 40 km/h (25 mph) and the maximum allowed speed is 120 km/h (75 mph), although speeding is not punished under 132 km/h (82 mph). However, on sections of the O-1 through central Istanbul the speed limit is 70 km/h (43 mph). In most tunnels the speed limit is 90 km/h (56 mph).

Alongside otoyols, there are resting areas, which are standardized as A, B, C and D type service areas. The D type is mainly a parking area. The C type has a fuel station added. The B type has a fuel station and a vehicle service station added. The A type additionally has a motel (in urban ones, this motel is traded for a large shopping mall).

Dangerous stretches such as tunnels or bridges where there is often fog, exits, interchanges and service areas are illuminated.

Since gradients are expected to be very low and turning radii are expected to be very high, otoyols have many bridges and tunnels which makes them very expensive to construct.

Otoyol signs in Turkey are green and uses the Highway Gothic typeface.

== Statistics ==
Map of the highways in the Otoyol network

=== Length ===
- Longest otoyol: 432 km (268 mi), O-21 between Ankara and Tarsus.
- Shortest otoyol: 20.5 km (12.7 mi), O-1 in Istanbul
- Longest bridge: 1915 Çanakkale Bridge, carries the O-6 over the Dardanelles.
- Longest tunnel: Tunnel 4 between Gebze and İzmit, on the O-7.
- Highest pass: Cankurtaran Pass with 1.580 metres on the O-4 at Ankara-Bolu border.

=== Provinces ===
- Provinces with an otoyol route(s): 28 provinces (Adana, Aksaray, Ankara, Aydın, Balıkesir, Bolu, Bursa, Çanakkale, Denizli, Düzce, Edirne, Gaziantep, Hatay, Istanbul, İzmir, Kahramanmaraş, Kırklareli, Kırşehir, Kocaeli, Manisa, Mersin, Nevşehir, Niğde, Osmaniye, Sakarya, Şanlıurfa, Tekirdağ, Yalova)
- Most otoyols in a province:
  - 5 routes: Istanbul Province, O-1, O-2, O-3, O-4, and O-7.
  - 5 routes: İzmir Province, O-5, O-30, O-31, O-32, and O-33.
- Most provinces served by an otoyol:
  - 7 provinces served by the O-21: Ankara, Aksaray, Kırşehir, Nevşehir, Niğde, Adana, Mersin
  - 6 provinces served by the O-4: Istanbul, Kocaeli, Sakarya, Düzce, Bolu, Ankara
  - 6 provinces served by the O-5: Kocaeli, Yalova, Bursa, Balıkesir, Manisa, İzmir
  - 5 provinces served by the O-52: Adana, Osmaniye, Kahramanmaraş, Gaziantep, Şanlıurfa

== Gallery ==
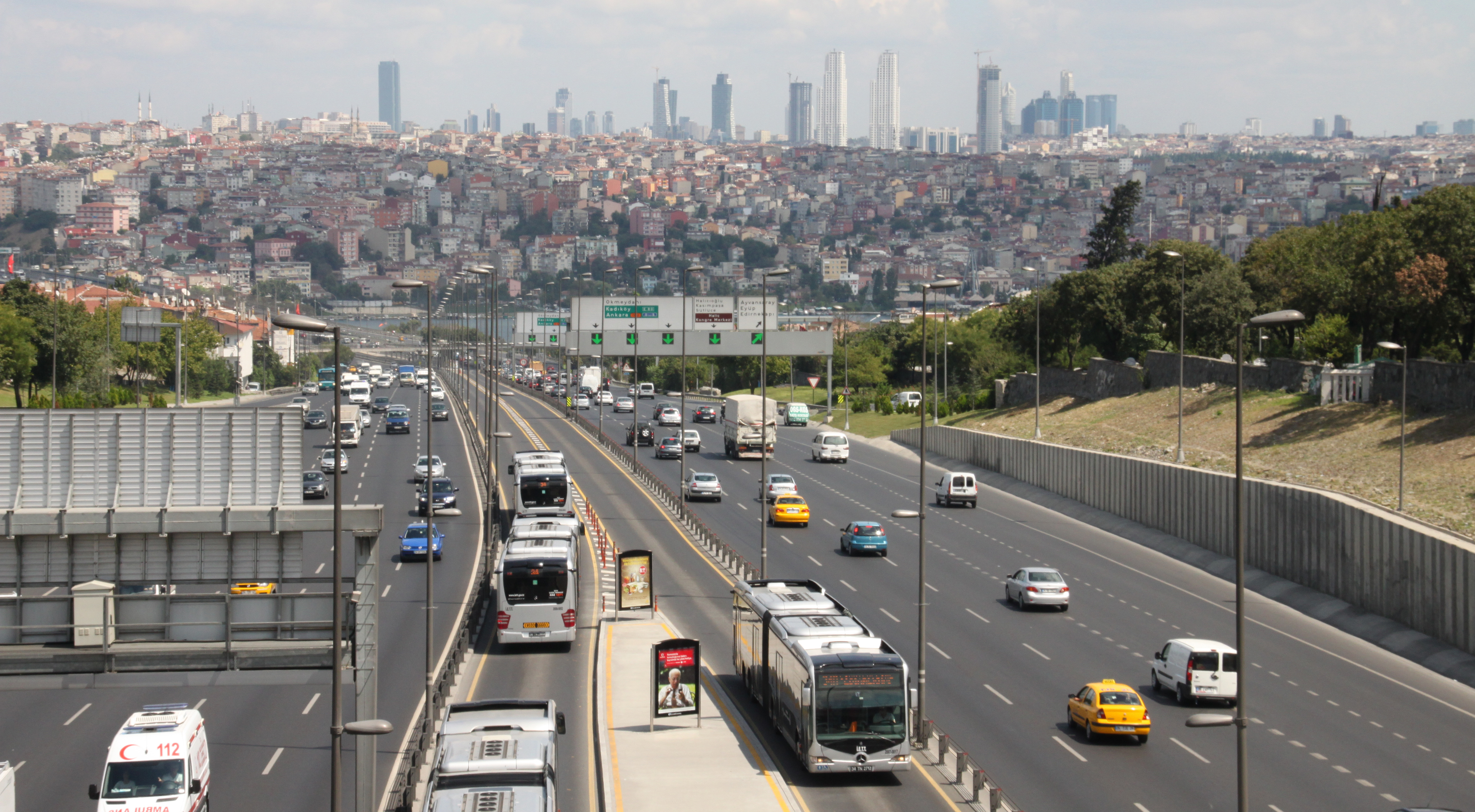
O-1 and the Haliç Bridge, with the Metrobus line in between the two carriageways

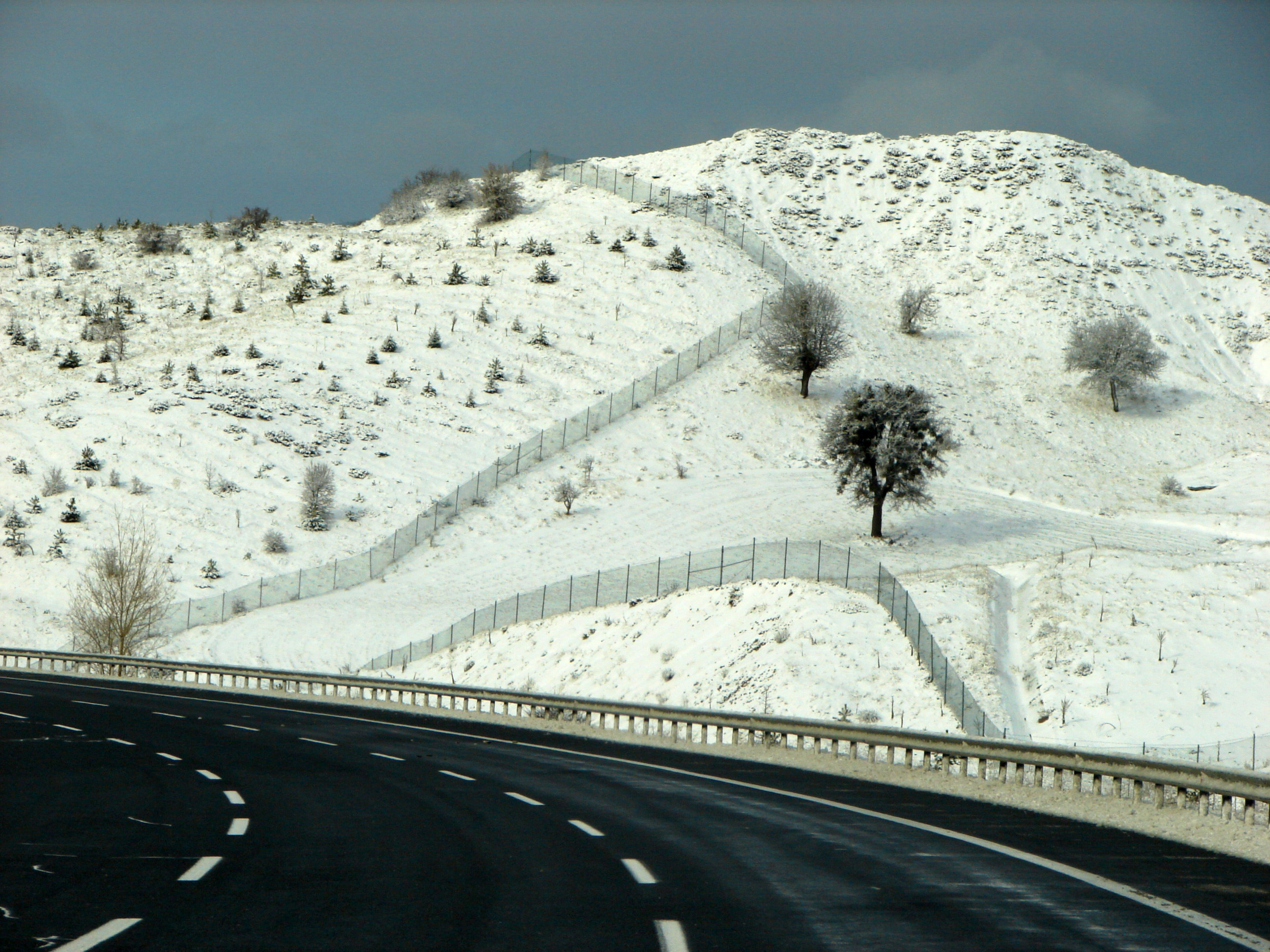
The O-4 near Ankara

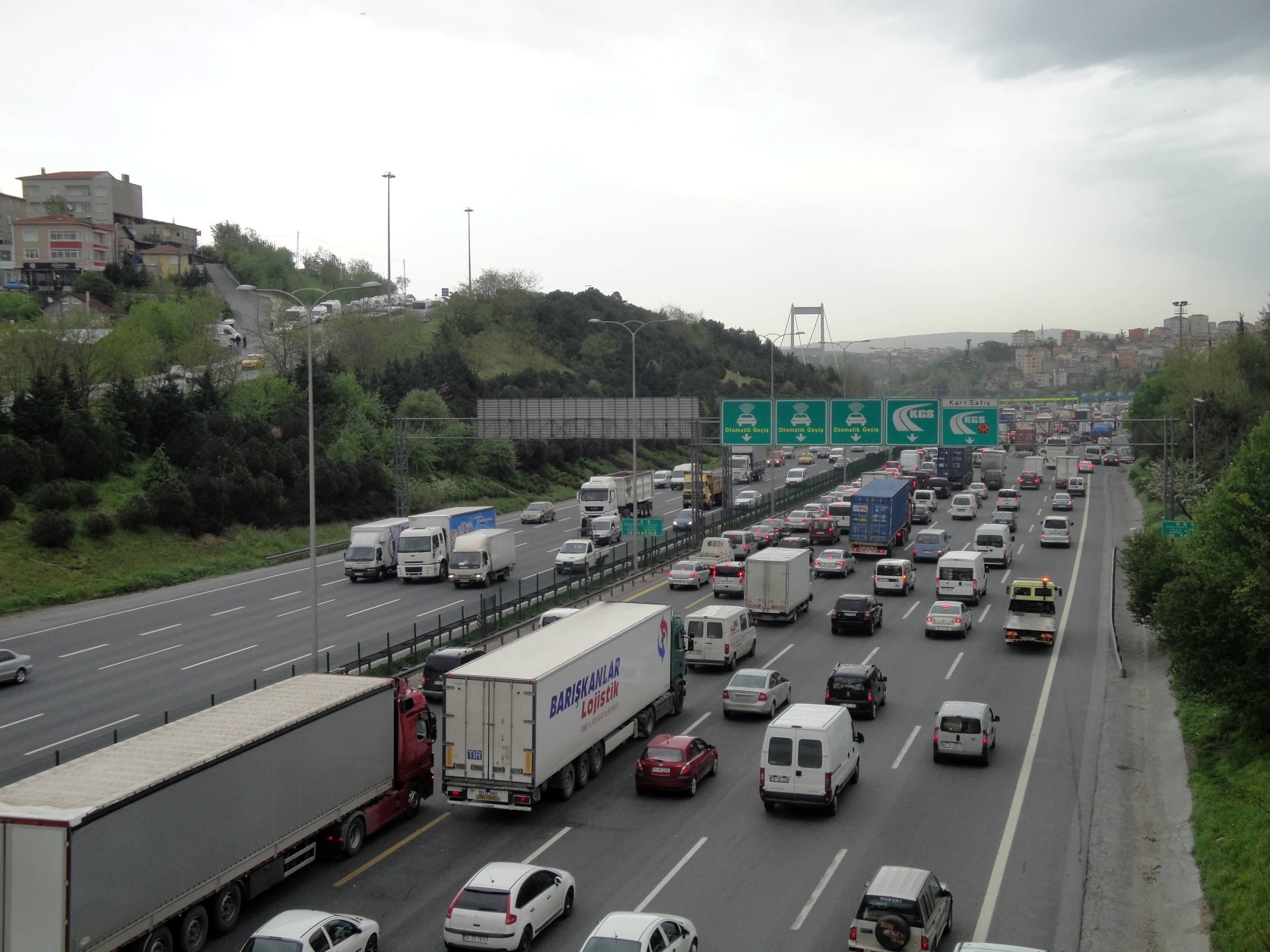
O-2 near the FSM Bridge

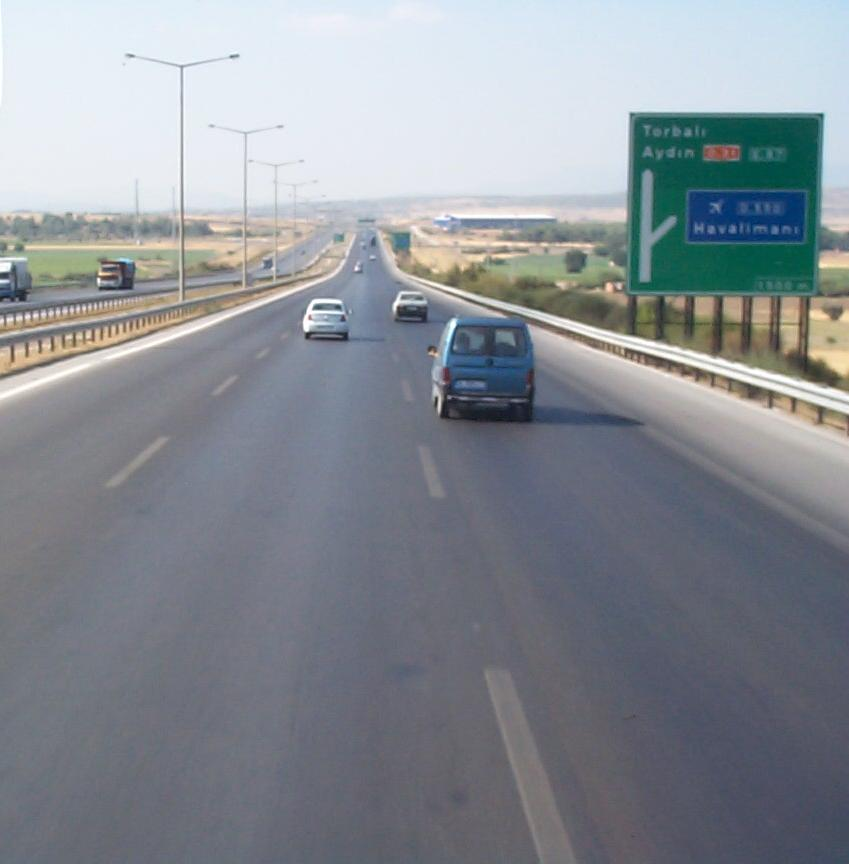
O-31 in İzmir

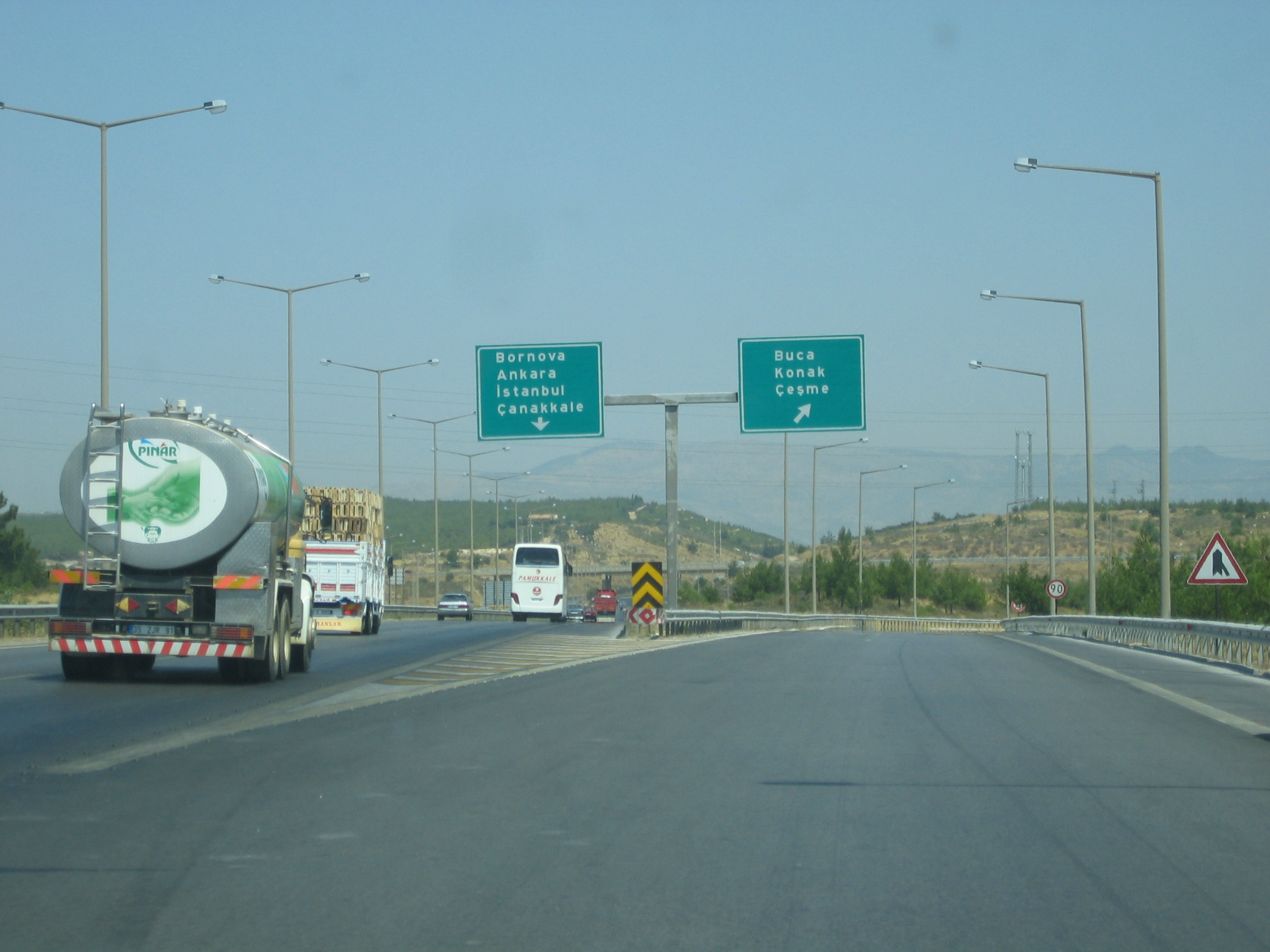
Junction of O-30 and O-31 near Buca, İzmir

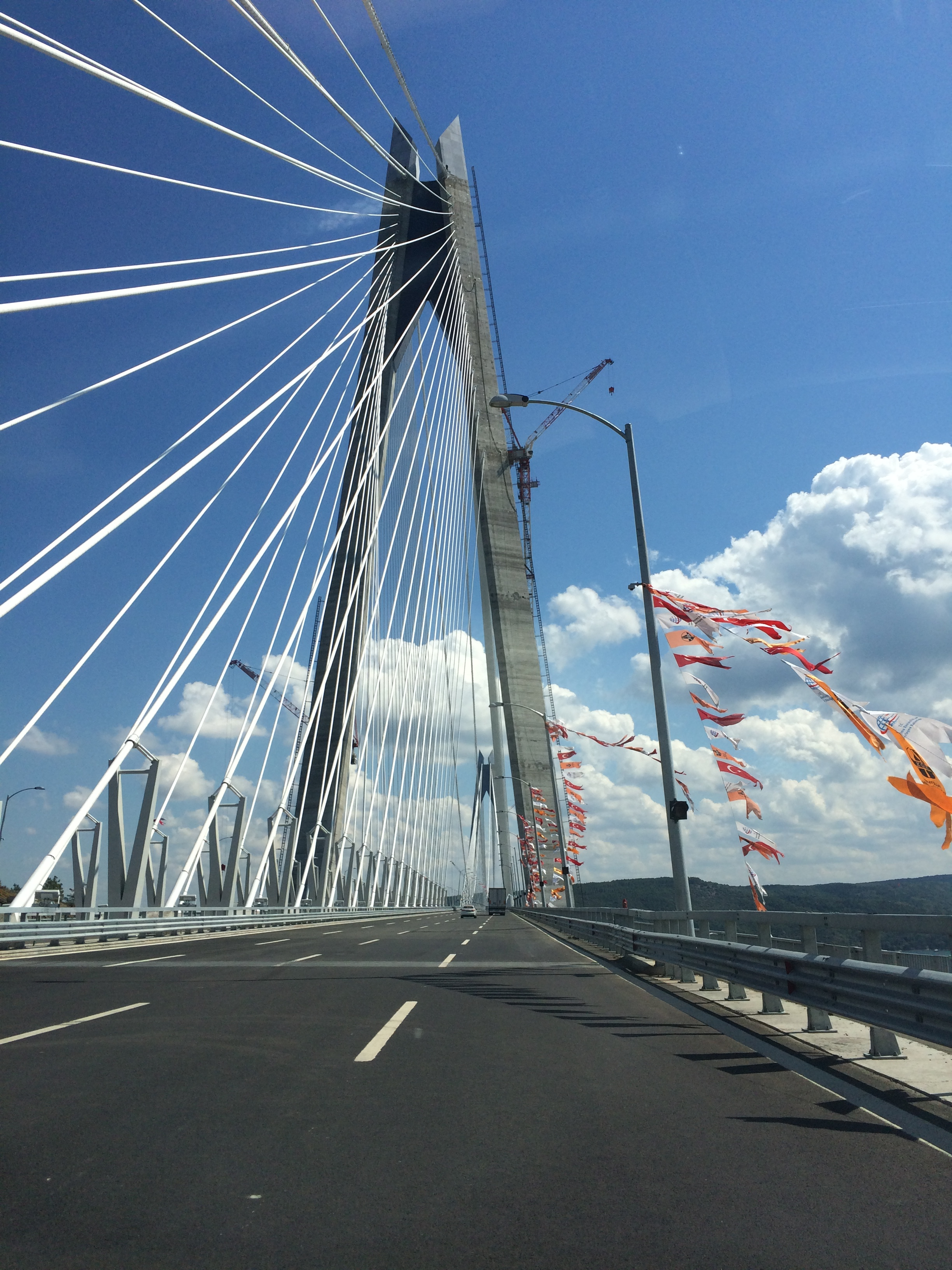
Yavuz Sultan Selim Bridge on the O-7

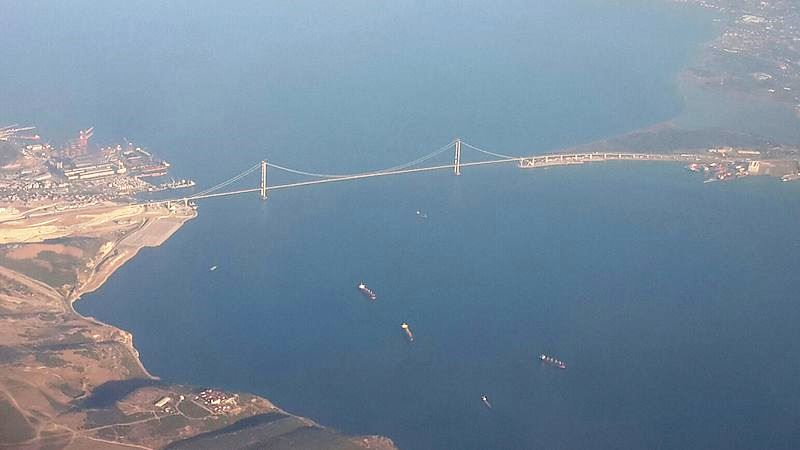
Osmangazi Bridge on the O-5

Otoyol entrance sign

== See also ==
- List of motorway tunnels in Turkey
- Turkish State Highway System
- List of highways in Turkey
- List of longest highways Turkey, 2nd & 7th
- List of controlled-access highway systems
- Transport in Turkey
- Roads in Turkey
