= List of bridges spanning the Bosphorus Strait =

The bridges spanning the Bosphorus Strait in Istanbul, Turkey are:

- Bosphorus Bridge, also called the First Bosphorus Bridge, a suspension bridge. Opened on October 30, 1973, with a longest span of 1074 meters and a total length of 1560 meters.
- Fatih Sultan Mehmet Bridge, also known as the Second Bosphorus Bridge, a suspension bridge. Opened on July 3, 1988, with a longest span of 1090 meters and a total length of 1510 meters.
- Yavuz Sultan Selim Bridge, also known as the Third Bosphorus Bridge, a suspension bridge. Opened on August 26, 2016, with a longest span of 1408 meters and a total length of 2164 meters.

== See also ==
- Bosphorus Strait#Crossings
