= Afyon–Antalya–Alanya Motorway =

Projected motorway in Turkey

The planned route.

The Afyon–Antalya–Alanya Motorway is a planned highway partially under construction in western Turkey. Serik-Alanya section of the motorway is under construction, while the part between Afyonkarahisar and Serik is under planning.

== History ==
The Ministry of Transport and Infrastructure had scheduled a tender of the section between Serik and Alanya on 25 August 2022. The tender of motorway project was rescheduled to 6 October 2022. The construction protocol for Serik-Alanya section of the motorway was signed on 14 October 2024.

== See also ==
- List of otoyol routes in Turkey
