= Otoyol 20 =

Highway in Turkey

O-20
- Ankara Beltway; Ankara Çevre yolu

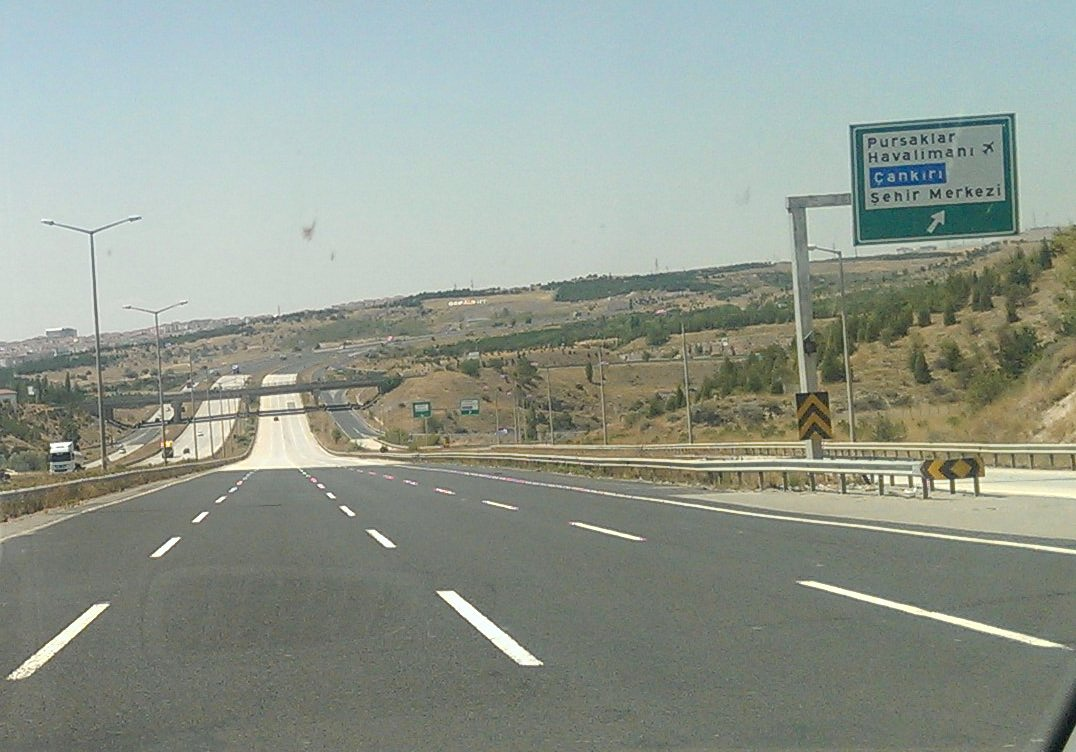

Route information
- Part of E88 / E89 / E90
- Length: 110 km (68 mi)

Location
- Country: Turkey
- Regions: Central Anatolia
- Provinces: Ankara Province
- Major cities: Ankara

Highway system
- Highways in Turkey; Motorways; List; State Highways; List
← O-7	→ O-21

Otoyol 20 (English: Motorway 20), O-20, Ankara Çevre yolu (English: Ankara Beltway), is a motorway in Ankara, Turkey that forms the ring road of the city. The 110 km (68 mi) long beltway connects in the northwest to the Anatolia Motorway, and in the south to Ankara-Adana Motorway.

The beltway is a four lane motorway in both directions on its length.

The beltway is the only ring motorway in Turkey to form a complete ring.

Province	District	Exit No.	Name	Notes
Ankara	Yenimahalle	K1	O-4 / E80 – Bolu, İzmit, Istanbul	
Ankara	Etimesgut	K2	1. TBMM Cd.	
Ankara	Etimesgut	K3	D.140 – Ayaş	
Ankara	Etimesgut	K4	Istasyon Cd.	
Ankara	Etimesgut	K5	Ahi Mesud Blvd.	
Ankara	Etimesgut	K6	D.200 / E90 – Eskişehir, Uşak, İzmir	
Ankara	Gölbaşı	K7	Turgut Özal Blvd.	
Ankara	Gölbaşı	K8	O-21 – Konya, Adana	
Ankara	Gölbaşı	K9	D.750 / E90 – Konya, Adana	
Ankara	Çankaya		Karataş Viaduct	600 m
Ankara	Çankaya	K10	Nato Yolu Cd.	
Ankara	Mamak	K11	Mavi Göl Cd.	
Ankara	Mamak		Bayındır Dam Bridge	400 m
Ankara	Mamak	K12	D.200 / E88 – Samsun	
Ankara	Mamak		Samsun Road Bridge	400 m
Ankara	Mamak	K13	Yeşil Kuşak Cd.	
Ankara	Altındağ		Çubuk 1 Dam Bridge	300 m
Ankara	Keçiören	K14	D.140 – Esenboğa International Airport	
Ankara	Keçiören	K15	Bağlum Blvd.	
Ankara	Keçiören	K16	Yozgat Blvd.	
Ankara	Yenimahalle	K17	Anadolu Blvd.	
Ankara	Yenimahalle	K18	Batıkent Yolu	
Ankara	Yenimahalle	K19	D.750 – Bolu, Sakarya, Istanbul	

== See also ==
- List of highways in Turkey
