= List of longest highways =

This article lists the world's longest road routes that are either officially numbered or otherwise known under a single name. Some of the roads may still be partially planned or under construction.

== Longest highways overall ==
Name	Length	Location	From	To	Notes
Highway 1	14,500 km (9,000 mi)	Australia	Loop route		Longest route within a single country by joining partial roads. Not a straight single road.
Asian Highway 2	13,177 km (8,188 mi)	Asia	Denpasar, Indonesia	Khosravi, Iran	Broken up by Bali Strait, Java Sea, and Karimata Strait.
Pan-American Highway	11,500 km (7,100 mi)	Americas	Prudhoe Bay, Alaska, United States	Yaviza, Panama	Together with the southern section, the entire length is 30,000km, however, the roads are not connected due to the 100km Darién Gap
Trans-Siberian Highway	11,000 km (6,800 mi)	Russia	St. Petersburg (Russia)	Vladivostok (Russia)	Longest non-loop route within a single country.
Tripoli–Cape Town Highway	10,808 km (6,716 mi)	Africa	Tripoli, Libya	Cape Town, South Africa	Longest Trans-African highway. Large sections remain missing.
Asian Highway 6	10,475 km (6,509 mi)	Eurasia	Busan, South Korea	Belarusian border, Russia	
Asian Highway 5	10,380 km (6,450 mi)	Eurasia	Shanghai, China	Bulgarian border, Turkey	
Cairo–Cape Town Highway	10,228 km (6,355 mi)	Africa	Cairo, Egypt	Cape Town, South Africa	Longest fully traversable Trans-African highway.
National Highway 219	10,000 km (6,200 mi)	China	Kom-Kanas, Xinjiang (China)	Dongxing, Guangxi (China)	Longest route in China. Parts still under construction.
Asian Highway 9	10,000 km (6,200 mi)	Eurasia	St. Petersburg, Russia	Lianyungang (China)	
Pan-American Highway	9,600 km (6,000 mi)	Americas	Barranquilla, Colombia	Puerto Montt or Quellón, Chile	Together with the northern section, the entire length is 30,000km, however, the roads are not connected due to the 100km Darién Gap
National Highway 331	9,200 km (5,700 mi)	China	Dandong, Liaoning (China)	Altay, Xinjiang (China)	Parts still under construction.
European route 40	8,690 km (5,400 mi)	Eurasia	Calais, France	Ridder, Kazakhstan	Longest E-road.
Cairo–Dakar Highway	8,636 km (5,366 mi)	Africa	Cairo, Egypt	Dakar, Senegal	Part of Trans-African highway network
European route 60	8,200 km (5,100 mi)	Eurasia	Brest, France	Irkeshtam, Kyrgyzstan	
National Highway 228	7,800 km (4,800 mi)	China	Dandong, Liaoning (China)	Dongxing, Guangxi (China)	Parts still under construction
Trans-Canada Highway	7,476 km (4,645 mi)	Canada	Victoria and Haida Gwaii, British Columbia (Canada)	St. John's, Newfoundland and Labrador (Canada)	Longest road route in Canada.
Asian Highway 3	7,331 km (4,555 mi)	Asia	Ulan-Ude, Russia	Chiang Rai, Thailand	Divided into two unconnected sections.
European route 45	5,190 km (3,220 mi)	Europe	Alta, Norway	Gela, Sicily, Italy	Longest north–south European route.
Golden Quadrilateral	5,846 km (3,633 mi)	India	Loop route in India		Longest road route in India.
U.S. Route 20	5,415 km (3,365 mi)	United States	Newport, Oregon (United States)	Boston, Massachusetts (United States)	Longest road in the United States.
Ruta Nacional 40	5,194 km (3,227 mi)	Argentina	Cape Virgenes, Santa Cruz Province, Argentina	La Quiaca, Provincia de Jujuy (Argentina)	At km 4601 is the highest road outside the Himalayas with 5000 msal and the longest in South America.
Interstate 90	4,861 km (3,020 mi)	United States	Seattle, Washington (United States)	Boston, Massachusetts (United States)	Longest Expressway.
BR-116	4,714 km (2,929 mi)	Brazil	Fortaleza-CE (Brazil)	Jaguarão-RS (Brazil)	Longest highway in Brazil.
BR-101	4,658 km (2,894 mi)	Brazil	Touros-RN (Brazil)	São José do Norte-RS (Brazil)	Second longest highway in Brazil.
National Highway 27	4,112 km (2,555 mi)	India	Porbandar, Gujarat (India)	Silchar, Assam (India)	Longest national highway of India
National Highway 44	3,717 km (2309 mi)	India	Srinagar, Jammu and Kashmir (India)	Kanyakumari, Tamil Nadu (India)	North - South national highway in India.
Grand Trunk Road	3,655 km (2272 mi)	Asia	Kabul, Afghanistan (Afghanistan)	Teknaf, Cox Bazar, Bangladesh (Bangladesh)	Oldest highway in Asia and the world.
Chile Route 5	3,364 km (2,090 mi)	Chile	Peruvian border at Arica (Chile)	Puerto Montt (Chile)	Part of the Pan-American Highway.
Pan-Philippine Highway (AH26)	3,380 km (2,100 mi)	Philippines	Laoag (Philippines)	Zamboanga (Philippines)	Longest highway in Southeast Asia.
National route 1	3,087 km (1,918 mi)	DR Congo	Boma (Democratic Republic of the Congo)	Lubumbashi (Democratic Republic of the Congo)	Longest national highway in Africa.

== Longest controlled-access highways ==
Name	Length	Location	From 1	From 2	Note
Interstate 90	4,861 km (3,020 mi)	United States	Seattle, Washington	Boston, Massachusetts	Longest Interstate Highway in the United States
Interstate 80	4,666 km (2,899 mi)	United States	San Francisco, California	Teaneck, New Jersey	
G30 Lianyungang–Khorgas Expressway	4,244 km (2,637 mi)	China	Lianyungang, Jiangsu	Khorgas, Xinjiang	Longest expressway in China
Interstate 40	4,119 km (2,559 mi)	United States	Barstow, California	Wilmington, North Carolina	
Interstate 10	3,960 km (2,460 mi)	United States	Santa Monica, California	Jacksonville, Florida	
G6 Beijing–Lhasa Expressway	3,718 km (2,310 mi)	China	Beijing	Lhasa, Tibet	Sections between Nagqu and Golmud still incomplete
G15 Shenyang–Haikou Expressway	3,710 km (2,310 mi)	China	Shenyang, Liaoning	Haikou, Hainan	
G25 Changchun–Shenzhen Expressway	3,580 km (2,220 mi)	China	Changchun, Jilin	Shenzhen, Guangdong	
G7 Beijing–Ürümqi Expressway	2,540 km (1,580 mi)	China	Beijing	Ürümqi, Xinjiang	
Interstate 70	2,151 km (1,337 mi)	United States	Cove Fort, Utah	Baltimore, Maryland	
Trans Sumatra Toll Road	2,048 km (1,272 mi)	Indonesia	Banda Aceh	Bakauheni	It is expected to be completed in 2029. Length is the total planned network length.
North–South expressway	1,941 km (1,206 mi)	Vietnam	Hanoi	Cần Thơ	Majority of the route still planned or under construction

== See also ==
- List of countries by road network size
- List of longest ring roads
