= List of otoyol routes in Turkey =

Otoyol
- Route markers for three Turkish Motorways

- Otoyol network in Turkey as of October 2024. Motorways in use and under construction.

System information
- Maintained by Karayolları Genel Müdürlüğü
- Formed: 1968

Highway names
- Otoyols: Otoyol XX (O-XX)

System links
- Highways in Turkey; Motorways; List; State Highways; List

Otoyol routes in Turkey follow a regional based two-digit numbering system. All routes have the prefix O on all signage and maps. Motorways that start in the Marmara region are all single digit. Motorways that start in The Central Anatolia Region have a first digit of two. Motorways starting in the Aegean Region have a first digit of three. Motorways starting in the Mediterranean Region and Southeastern Anatolia Region have a first digit of five. The O-21A is the only motorway to have a letter assigned to it. Most motorways in Turkey have six lanes (3+3 lanes), however there are sections of some motorways with only four (2+2) lanes. The motorways extended to 28 of the country's 81 provincial-level administrative divisions.

As of October 2024, there are 3,796 km of toll motorways network (otoyollar) in service.

== List of Otoyol routes ==
Number	Length (km)	Length (mi)	Northern or western terminus	Southern or eastern terminus	Built	Notes
O-1	4.9 km	3.0 mi	in Osmaniye K.(K1) Bakırköy, Istanbul	Bağdat Avenue in Söğütlüçeşme K.(K15) Kadıköy, Istanbul	1973	Istanbul First Beltway
O-2	36.9	22.9	O-3 in Mahmutbey doğu K.(K20), Istanbul	O-4 in Anadolu otoyolu K.(K10) Istanbul	1988	Istanbul second Beltway
O-3	246.9	153.4	Edirne Batı K.(K1) near Edirne	O-2 Mahmutbey Doğu K.(K20) in Bağcılar, Istanbul	1987	
O-4	372	231.2	O-2 Anadolu Otoyolu K10 junction in Ümraniye- Ataşehir, Istanbul	O-20 near Sincan, Ankara	1984	
O-5	409.4	254.4	O-4 Muallim köy K7-1 junction in Gebze, Kocaeli	O-30 in Bornova, İzmir	2016 till 2019	Section from Bursa North to Gebze including Osman Gazi Bridge opened in 2016.
O-6	101	62.8	near Malkara, Tekirdağ	near Lapseki, Çanakkale	2022	Section from Malkara to Lapseki including 1915 Çanakkale Bridge, the longest suspension bridge in the world, opened in 2022.
O-7	275.2	171.1	O-3 near Kınalı,Silivri Istanbul	O-4 near Akyazı, Sakarya	2016 till 2020	Yavuz Sultan Selim Bridge istanbul Third Beltway
O-20	110	68.4	Road forms complete ring around Ankara	Road forms complete ring around Ankara	1987	Ankara beltway
O-21	399.5	248.3	O-20 near Gölbaşı, Ankara	near Tarsus, Mersin	1984 till 2020	
O-21A	32	19.9	near Çakmak Bucağı, Konya	O-21 near Eminlik, Niğde	1992	
O-22	34.1	21.2	O-5 near Çağlayan, Bursa	near Turanköy, Bursa	2006	
O-30	60.4	37.5	O-33 in Menemen, İzmir	O-32 in Balçova, İzmir	1993 till 2006	Izmir Beltway
O-31	127.8	79.4	O-30 in Buca, İzmir	in Aydın	1996 till 2004	
O-31	165	102.5	in Aydın	in Denizli	2023 till 2024	
O-32	77.7	48.3	in Çeşme, İzmir	O-30 in Balçova, İzmir	1992 till 1996	
O-33	76	47	Port of Çandarlı near Çandarlı, İzmir	O-30 in Menemen, İzmir	2019	
O-51	99.2	61.6	in Çeşmeli, Mersin	O-52 in Adana	1992	
O-52	365	226.8	O-51 in Adana	near Şanlıurfa	1992	
O-53	150	93.2	O-52 near Ceyhan	in İskenderun	1993	
O-54	35	21.7	in Gaziantep	O-52 in Gaziantep	2013	Gaziantep Beltway

== Projects ==
=== Under Construction ===
Number	Length (km)	Length (mi)	Northern or western terminus	Southern or eastern terminus	Opens	Notes
O-7	45	28	O-7 near Nakkaş, Istanbul	O-7 near Başakşehir, Istanbul	2026	
O-51	52	32.3	in Kızkalesi, Mersin	O-51 near Çeşmeli, Mersin	2026	
O-20	120	74.6	O-20 in Mamak, Ankara	in Delice, Kırıkkale	2026	Part of Ankara-Samsun Motorway. Delice-Samsun section still in planning phase.
O-51	122	75.8	in Serik	in Alanya	2027	Part of Afyon–Antalya–Alanya Motorway. Afyonkarahisar-Burdur-Antalya-Serik section still in planning phase.
O-6	127	78.9	near Malkara, Tekirdağ	O-3 near Kınalı, Istanbul	2027	Part of Kınalı-Balıkesir Motorway.
O-53	19.2	11.9	O-53 near İskenderun, Hatay	near Topboğazı, Hatay	2028	İskenderun-Antakya Motorway
	31.3	19.5	O-53 near Dörtyol, Hatay	near Hassa, Hatay	2030	Dörtyol-Hassa Motorway

=== Tender Phase ===
Number	Length (km)	Length (mi)	Northern or western terminus	Southern or eastern terminus	Tender Date	Notes
	130	80.8	O-22 in Sivrihisar, Eskişehir	O-20 in Tulumtaş, Ankara		Part of Izmir–Ankara Motorway. İzmir-Sivrihisar section still in planning phase.
O-52	454	282.1	O-52 near Şanlıurfa	near Habur, Silopi, Şırnak		Şanlıurfa-Mardin-Habur Motorway (including link to Diyarbakır) (border crossing)

=== Planning Phase ===
Number	Length (km)	Length (mi)	Northern or western terminus	Southern or eastern terminus	Tender Date	Notes
O-51	276	171.5	O-7 near Akyazı, Sakarya	O-20 near Sincan, Ankara	N/A	Central Anatolian Motorway
O-51	30	18.1	in Taşucu	O-51 near Kızkalesi, Mersin	N/A	
	89	55.3	O-21 near Pozantı, Adana	O-52 near Ceyhan, Adana	N/A	Adana peripheral motorway
	12	7.46	O-30 near Sasalı, İzmir	O-30 near İnciraltı, İzmir	N/A	İZKARAY - Gulf of İzmir Passage Project between Çiğli (Sasalı) and Balçova (İnciraltı); including one undersea tunnel and one bridge
	41	25.5	O-33 near Menemen, İzmir	O-30 near Buca, İzmir	N/A	İzmir 2. peripheral motorway
O-31	155	96.3	O-31 in Denizli	near Bucak, Burdur	N/A	Denizli-Burdur section of Aydın-Denizli-Burdur Motorway
O-6	137	85.1	near Lapseki, Çanakkale	O-5 near Balıkesir	N/A	Lapseki-Balıkesir section of Kınalı-Balıkesir Motorway
	350	217.5	near Afyonkarahisar	near Serik, Antalya	N/A	Afyon–Antalya–Alanya Motorway
	408	253.5	O-5 near Turgutlu, Manisa	O-22 near Sivrihisar	N/A	Sivrihisar-İzmir section of Ankara-İzmir Motorway
O-22	231	143.5	O-5 near Kestel, Bursa	O-22 near Sivrihisar, Eskişehir	N/A	Sivrihisar-Bursa Motorway
	303	188.3	near Samsun	near Delice, Kırıkkale	N/A	Delice-Samsun section of Ankara-Samsun Motorway
	144	89.5	near Bafra, Samsun	near Ünye, Ordu	N/A	Bafra-Samsun-Ünye Motorway
	137	85.2	O-4 in Gerede, Bolu	in Ilgaz, Çankırı	N/A	Part of Gerede-Gürbulak Motorway. Ilgaz-Merzifon-Koyulhisar-Pülümür-Horasan-Gürbulak sections still in planning phase.
	183	113.7	near Ilgaz, Çankırı	near Merzifon, Amasya	N/A	Ilgaz-Merzifon Motorway
	919	571	near Merzifon, Amasya	near Gürbulak, Doğubayazıt, Ağrı	N/A	Merzifon-Gürbulak Motorway (border crossing)
	91	56.6	O-5 near Yalova	O-4 near İzmit, Kocaeli	N/A	Yalova-İzmit Motorway
	440	273.4	near Afyonkarahisar	near Ulukışla, Niğde	N/A	Afyonkarahisar-Konya-Ereğli-Niğde (Ulukışla) Motorway
	105	65.3	near Bozüyük, Bilecik	near Afyonkarahisar	N/A	Bozüyük-Afyonkarahisar Motorway
O-51	200	124.3	near Alanya, Antalya	near Silifke, Mersin	N/A	Alanya-Silifke Motorway
	105	65.3	O-4 near Düzce	near Zonguldak	N/A	Düzce-Zonguldak Motorway
	500	310.7	near Delice, Kırıkkale	near Refahiye, Erzincan	N/A	Delice-Sivas-Refahiye Motorway
	600	372.8	O-21 near Nevşehir	near Diyarbakır	N/A	Nevşehir-Kayseri-Malatya-Diyarbakır Motorway
	220	136.7	near Sivas	near Malatya	N/A	Sivas-Malatya Motorway
	50	31.1	O-52 near Şanlıurfa	near Akçakale, Şanlıurfa	N/A	Şanlıurfa-Akçakale Motorway (border crossing)
	475	295.2	near Diyarbakır	near Gürbulak, Doğubayazıt, Ağrı	N/A	Diyarbakır-Gürbulak Motorway (border crossing)
	540	335.6	near Trabzon	near Kahramanmaraş	N/A	Trabzon-Refahiye-Malatya-Kahramanmaraş Motorway
	250	155.4	near Pasinler, Erzurum	near Türkgözü, Posof, Ardahan	N/A	Pasinler-Türkgözü Motorway (border crossing)
	460	285.8	near Rize	near Diyarbakır	N/A	Rize-Erzurum-Diyarbakır Motorway
O-33	80	49.7	O-33 near Çandarlı, Dikili, İzmir	O-5 near Savaştepe, Balıkesir	N/A	Çandarlı-Bergama-Savaştepe Motorway
	90	55.9	O-31 near Aydın	near Muğla	N/A	Aydın-Muğla Motorway
	75	46.6	near İpsala, Edirne	near Malkara, Tekirdağ	N/A	Malkara-İpsala Motorway (border crossing)
	130	80.8	O-3 near Havsa, Edirne	near Kavakköy, Gelibolu, Çanakkale	N/A	Havsa-Gelibolu Motorway
	180	111.9	near Lapseki, Çanakkale	O-5 near Karacabey, Bursa	N/A	Lapseki-Karacabey Motorway
	34	21.1	O-5 near Ovaakça, Bursa	O-5 near Konaklı, Bursa	N/A	Bursa Northern Ring Road

== See also ==
- List of motorway tunnels in Turkey
- List of highways in Turkey
- Transport in Turkey
