= Gürbulak =

- Village
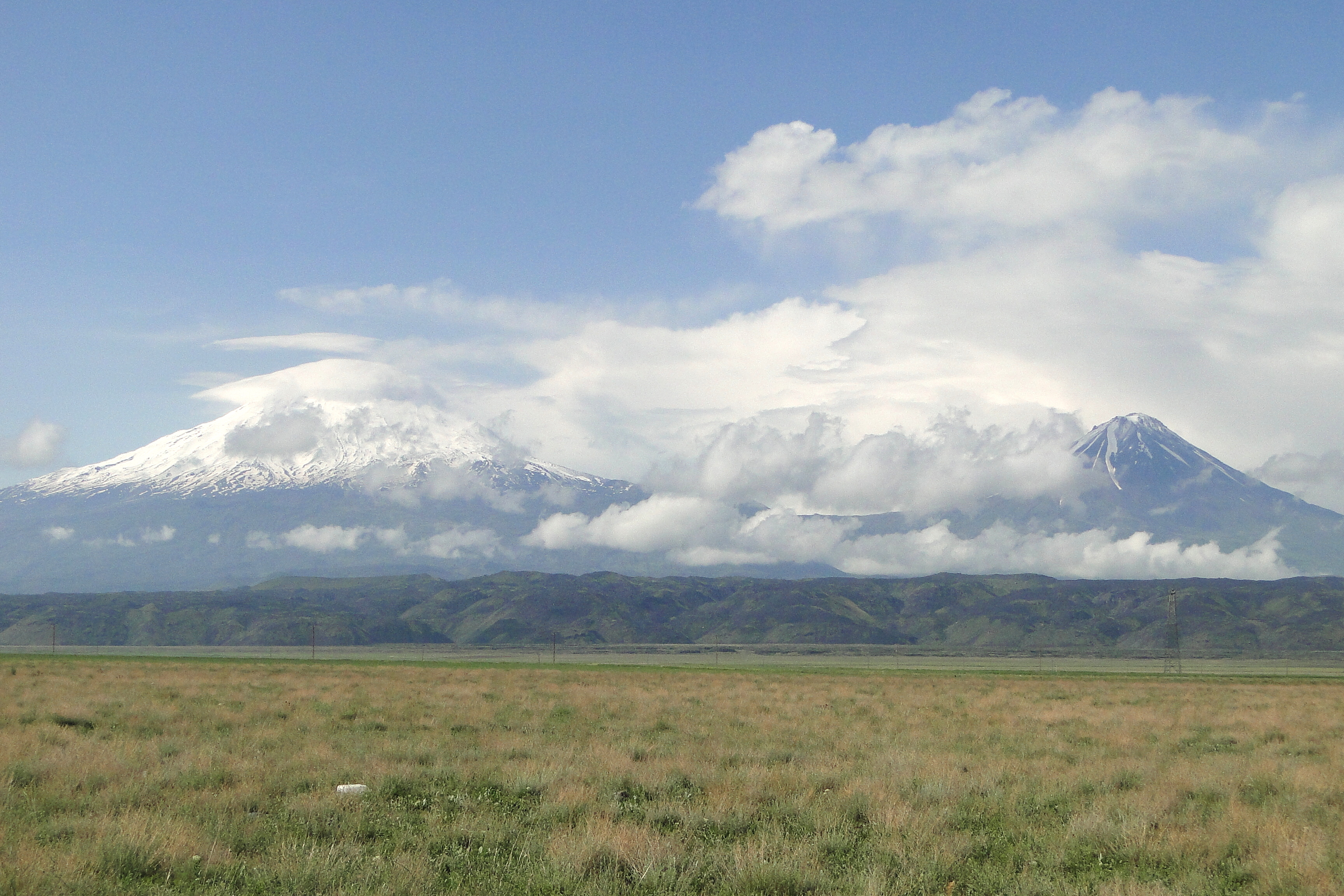
- Mt. Ararat, Gürbulak

- Location within Turkey
- Coordinates: 39°24′59″N 44°21′09″E
- Country: Turkey
- Province: Ağrı
- District: Doğubayazıt
- Population (2021): 2,205
- Time zone: UTC+3 (TRT)
- Area code: 0472

Gürbulak is a village in Doğubayazıt District, Ağrı Province, Turkey. Its population is 2,205 (2021). It is a border crossing into Iran. The settlement marks the eastern limit of the state road D.100 and the European route E80.
