= Tulumtaş, Gölbaşı =

Tulumtaş
- Neighbourhood
- Location in Turkey Tulumtaş (Turkey Central Anatolia)
- Coordinates: 39°45′21″N 32°39′04″E
- Country: Turkey
- Province: Ankara
- District: Gölbaşı
- Population (2022): 2,708
- Time zone: UTC+3 (TRT)

Tulumtaş is a neighbourhood in the municipality and district of Gölbaşı, Ankara Province, Turkey. Its population is 2,708 (2022).
