= Sincan, Ankara =

Sincan
- District and municipality
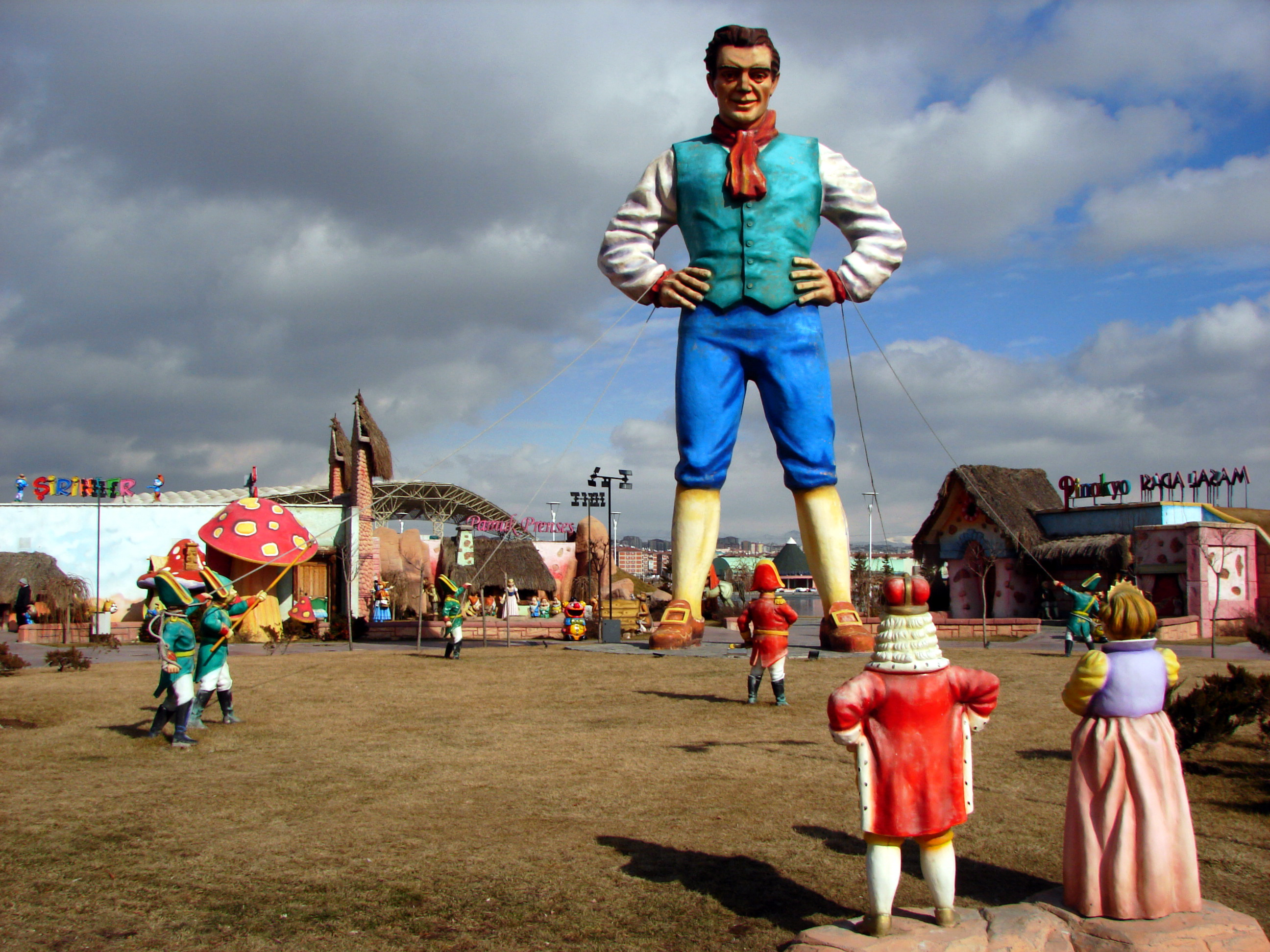
- Wonderland Ankara (Harikalar Diyarı), an amusement park in Sincan

- Logo

- Map showing Sincan District in Ankara Province

- Location within Turkey Location within Turkey Central Anatolia
- Coordinates: 39°57′34″N 32°34′36″E
- Country: Turkey
- Province: Ankara

Government
  - Mayor: Murat Ercan (AKP)
- Area: 880 km^{2} (340 sq mi)
- Elevation: 789 m (2,589 ft)
- Population (2022): 572,609
  - Density: 650/km^{2} (1,700/sq mi)
- Time zone: UTC+3 (TRT)
- Postal code: 06930
- Area code: 0312
- Website: www.sincan.bel.tr

Sincan is a municipality and metropolitan district of Ankara Province, Turkey. Its area is 880 km^{2}, and its population is 572,609 (2022). It is a large town 27 km from the city of Ankara. Its elevation is 789 m (2,589 ft). Sincan has friendly relations with the municipality of Doboj Jug from Bosnia and Herzegovina.

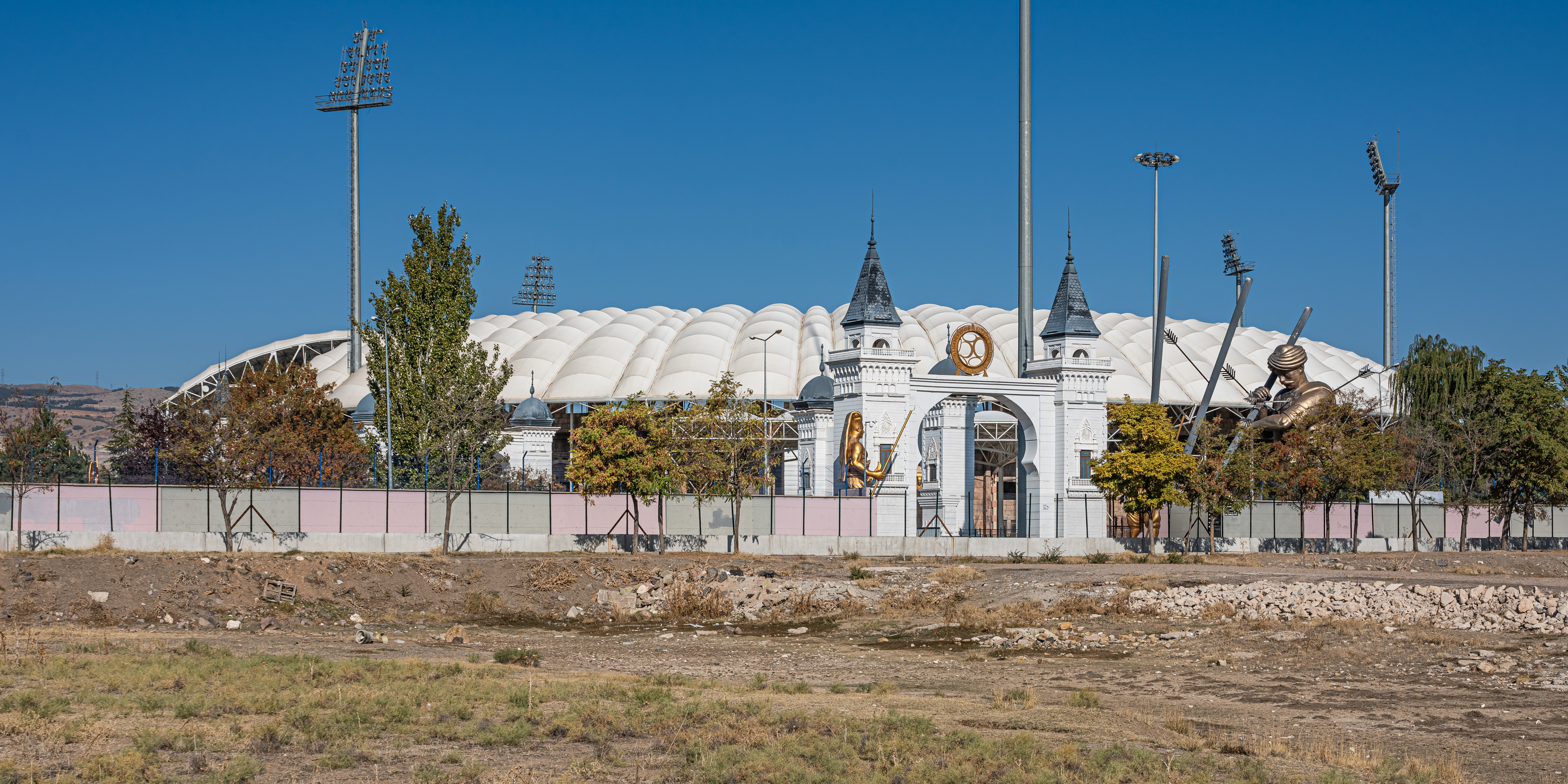
Osmanlı Stadium in Sincan, Ankara.

Sincan District hosts ASO 1. Organize Sanayi Bölgesi, the biggest Organized Industrial Zone in Ankara, operated by Ankara Chamber of Industry.

== Demographics ==
Historical population
Year	Pop.	±% p.a.
2007	413,030	—
2012	479,454	+3.03%
2017	524,222	+1.80%
2022	572,609	+1.78%
Source: TÜIK (2007-2022)

== Geography ==
Sincan stands on a plain surrounded by hills and watered by the Ankara River, a tributary of the Sakarya River. There is some agriculture and light industry in Sincan, but the majority of people commute to Ankara by rail.

The symbol of the municipality is the tulip. The central square is called Lale Meydanı (Turkish for "tulip square"), and every year a tulip festival is held where plastic tulips are handed out in the streets.

== Composition ==
There are 57 neighbourhoods in Sincan District:

- 29 Ekim
- Adalet
- Ahi Evran
- Akçaören
- Akşemsettin
- Alagöz
- Alcı
- Anayurt
- Andiçen
- Atatürk
- Bacı
- Beyobası
- Çiçektepe
- Çoğlu
- Çokören
- Cumhuriyet
- Erkeksu
- Ertuğrulgazi
- Esenler
- Fatih
- Fevzi Çakmak
- Gazi
- Gazi Osmanpaşa
- Girmeç
- Gökçek
- Hisarlıkaya
- Hürriyet
- İlyakut
- İncirlik
- İstasyon
- İstiklal
- Kesiktaş
- Malazgirt
- Malıköy
- Maraşal Çakmak
- Menderes
- Mevlana
- Mülk
- Mustafa Kemal
- Osmaniye
- Osmanlı
- Pınarbaşı
- Plevne
- Polatlar
- Saraycık
- Selçuklu
- Tandoğan
- Tatlar
- Törekent
- Türkobası
- Ücret
- Ulubatlı Hasan
- Yeniçimşit
- Yenihisar
- Yenikayı
- Yenipeçenek
- Yunus Emre

== History ==
Even prior to the period of the Ottoman Empire, a village stood in this location, which subsequently grew to when Mustafa Kemal Atatürk commissioned a housing project here for Turkish refugees from Bulgaria. The battle saw fighting during the Battle of the Sakarya in the Turkish War of Independence. This was the furthest spot in Anatolia in which the Greek Army had advanced to.

== Well-known residents ==
- Şafak Sezer, actor and comedian
- Sinan Şamil Sam, professional boxer
- Oğuz Yılmaz, folk musician
