= List of highways in Turkey =

Otoyol Devlet yolu İl yolu
- 34-11 34-27 34-28 Route markers

- Otoyol network in Turkey as of January 2026. Motorways in use and under construction.

System information
- Maintained by Karayolları Genel Müdürlüğü
- Formed: 1950, 1968

Highway names
- Otoyols: Otoyol XX (O-XX)
- Website: www.kgm.gov.tr/Sayfalar/KGM/SiteTr/Root/default.aspx

System links
- Highways in Turkey; Motorways; List; State Highways; List

The highways in Turkey are divided into three types: motorways, state roads and provincial roads.

== Types of roads ==
There are three types of intercity roads in Turkey:

Motorways are controlled-access highways that are officially named Otoyol. But it is not uncommon for people in Turkey to call them Otoban (referring to Autobahn) as this types of roads entered popular culture by the means of Turks in Germany. These roads depend on the General Directorate of Highways except those that are financed with a BOT model.

State roads (Devlet Yolları) are historical and free road network that are completely under the responsibility of the General Directorate of Highways except for urban sections (like the sections falling within the inner part of ring roads of Ankara, Istanbul or İzmir). Even if they mostly possess dual carriageways and interchanges, they also have some traffic lights and intersections.

Provincial roads (Il Yolları) are highways of secondary importance linking districts within a province to each other, the provincial center, the districts in the neighboring provinces, the state roads, railway stations, seaports, and airports.

- Motorways: Motorway 3.796 km (January 2025)
- Dual carriageways: 29.673 km (January 2025)
- State Highways 30.832 km (January 2025)
- Provincial Roads 33.922 km (January 2025)
- Motorway Projects‐Vision 8.325 km (in 2053)

As of 2023, there are 471 tunnels (total length 665 km) and 9.660 bridges (total length 739 km) on the network.

== Motorways ==
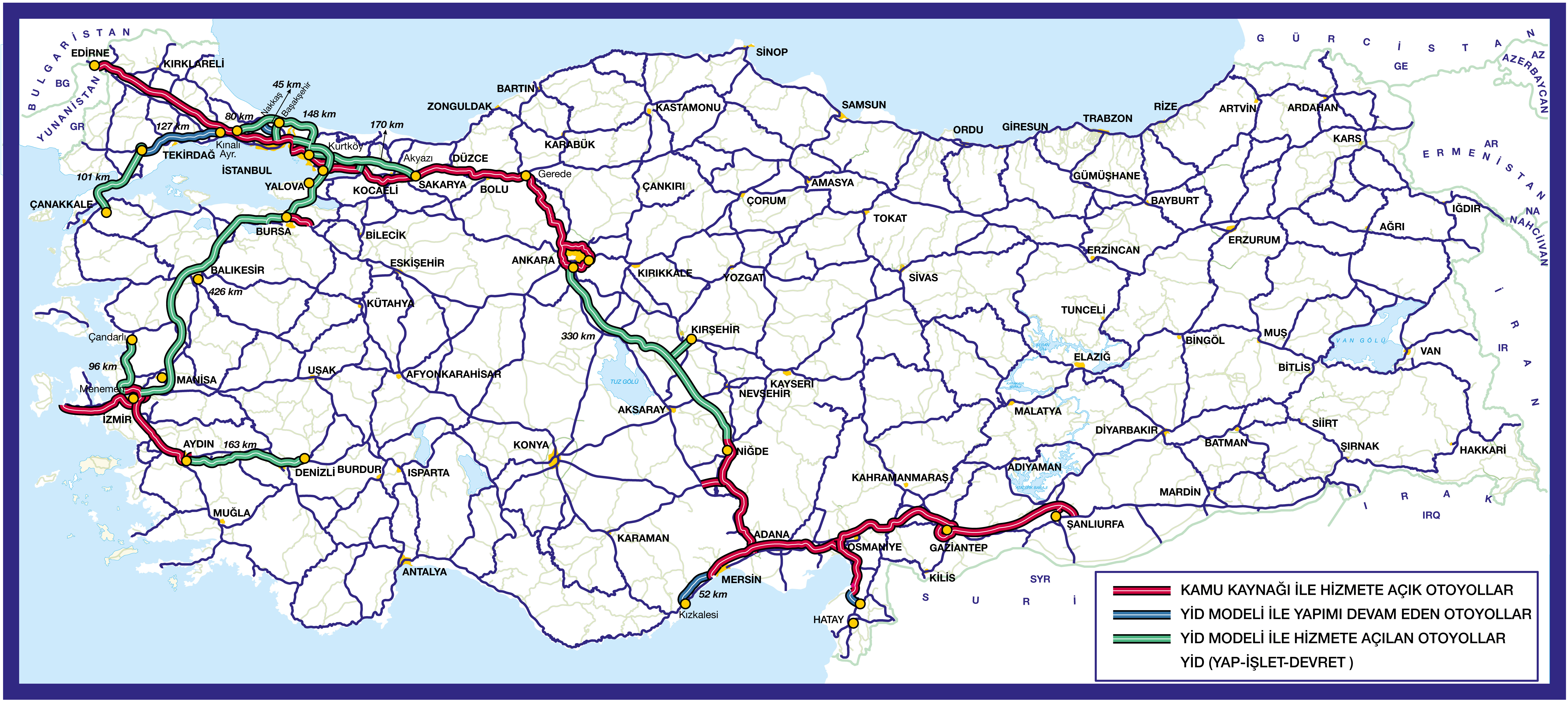
Motorways are marked with double lines; completed motorways are in red; build–operate–transfer routes are in green; routes under construction as of 2024 (also BOT) are in blue

Turkey has national network of controlled-access highways; these motorways are called otoyollar, singular otoyol, in Turkish. Most sections have three lanes in each direction and most are tolled. Older routes were built solely with state funds, while newer routes and routes under construction were developed through the build–operate–transfer (BOT; yap–işlet–devret) model, where private companies build and operate the highway for a specified period before transferring ownership to the state. This allows for private investment in highway infrastructure to support expansion and maintenance without immediate public expenditure.

== State roads ==
The numbering of state roads is as indicated below:

- D0XX, D1XX, D2XX, D3XX, D4XX: West–east roads (numbered west to east )
- D5XX, D6XX, D7XX, D8XX, D9XX: North–south roads (numbered north to south)

=== West – east reference main ===
- D.010 Karasu – Akçakoca – Karadeniz Ereğli-Zonguldak – Çaycuma – Bartın – Cide – İnebolu – Ayancık – Sinop – Gerze-Bafra-Samsun – Çarşamba – Ünye – Fatsa – Ordu – Bulancak – Giresun – Tirebolu – Trabzon – Sürmene – Rize – Ardeşen – Hopa – Borçka – Şavşat – Ardahan-Çıldır – Arpaçay – Akçakale village of Susuz
- D.100 Edirne – Lüleburgaz – Istanbul – Gebze – İzmit – Adapazarı – Düzce – Bolu – Gerede – Ilgaz – Merzifon – Amasya – Niksar – Erzincan – Erzurum – Ağrı – Doğubeyazıt – Gürbulak (Iran border)
- D.200 Çanakkale – Bandırma – Bursa – Eskişehir – Sivrihisar – Ankara – Kırıkkale – Yozgat -Sivas – Erzincan
- D.300 Çeşme -İzmir – Salihli – Uşak – Afyon – Akşehir – Konya – Aksaray – Nevşehir – Kayseri – Pınarbaşı – Gürün – Malatya – Elazığ – Bingöl – Muş – Bitlis – Van
- D.400 Datça – Fethiye – Antalya – Alanya – Anamur – Mersin – Adana – Gaziantep – Şanlıurfa – Şırnak – Hakkâri-Yüksekova-Esendere (Iran border)

=== West – east intermediate ===
- D.014 Kaynarca-Karasu
- D.020 Edirne- Kırklareli-Pınarhisar-Vize-Saray-Istanbul-Şile-Kandıra-Kaynarca-Adapazarı
- D.030 Devrek-Yenice-Karabük-Araç-Kastamonu-Taşköprü-Boyabat-Durağan-Vezirköprü-Havza-Ladik-Near Taşova
- D.040 Şebinkarahisar-Alucra-Şiran-Kelkit
- D.050 Intersection of D885 (E97) and D883-Bayburt-Değimencik village (It also part of D915)-İspir-Yusufeli-Intersection of D950
- D.052 Köse-Bayburt (From Bayburt it merges with D915)-Aşkale (From Bayburt it merges with D-100)-Nenehatun village of Dadaşköy
- D.060 Intersection of D950-Intersection of Olur-Intersection of D955-Göle-Intersection of Susuz-Intersection of European route 691 (D965)-Yolboyu village of Susuz (D010)-Şahnalar village-Akyaka intersection-Doğukapı border gate (Armenia border)
- D.070 Kars-Digor-Intersection of D080
- D.080 Horasan-Karakurt village of Sarıkamış (Intersection of D957)-Kağızman-Tuzluca-Iğdır -Aralık-Dilucu border gate (Nakhcivan republic of Azerbaijan border) (Between Iğdır to Nakhcivan border is part of E99)
- D.110 İpsala border gate (Greece border)-Keşan-Tekirdağ-Marmaraereğlisi-Silivri
- D.120 Intersection of D550-Kavakköy (Gelibolu)-Yeniköy (Şarköy)-Şarköy
- D.130 Yalova-Çiftlikköy-Altınova-Karamürsel-İzmit-Kocaeli
- D.140 Bediltahirbey village of Akyazı-Akyazı-Çavuşdere village of Mudurnu-Nallıhan-Beypazarı-Ayaş- Sincan-Akyurt-Kalecik
- D.150 Orhangazi-İznik-Mekece village of Pamukova (It merges with D-650)-Pamukova-Geyve-Taraklı
- D.160 Kestel-Turanköy (It shares same way with D200)-Yenişehir-Bilecik-Vezirhan-Gölpazarı- Taraklı (From Taraklı to Göynük it shares same way with D170)-Göynük-Mudurnu intersection-Bolu
- D.170 Taraklı-Göynük-Nallıhan
- D.180 Intersection of D765-Intersection of Kızılırmak-Intersection of Bayat-İntersection of İskilip-Çorum-Intersection of D795-Mecitözü-Intersection of D100-Intersection of D190 (Near Turhal)-Intersection of Pazar-Tokat
- D.190 Intersection of D200-Delice-Sungurlu-Intersection of D785-Alaca-Zile-Turhal
- D.210 Çanakkale-Çan
- D.230 Edremit-Havran-Balıkesir (Intersection of D573)-Kepsut-Dursunbey-Harmancık- Tavşanlı (Intersection of D595)-Kümbet village of İnönü (From Kütahya to Kümbet, it shares same way with D650)- Eskişehir
- D.240 Intersection of 550-Bergama-Kınık intersection-Soma-Kırkağaç intersection-Akhisar(From Akhisar to Sındırgı, it shares same way with D555)-Sındırgı-Simav-Intersection of D595-Gediz-Çavdarhisar- Kütahya
- D.250 Manisa-Turgutlu
- D.260 Afyonkarahisar-Bayat-Sivrihisar (From Sivrihisar to Polatlı, it shares same way with D200)-Polatlı-Haymana-Gölbaşı-Oğulbey village of Gölbaşı (It shares with D750)-Bala-Karakeçili -Kaman-Kırşehir-Mucur-Kayseri-Gemerek-Şarkışla-Kovalı village of Ulaş (From Kovalı, it shares with D850 to Kangal) -Ulaş-Kangal-Divriği-Arapgir-Keban-Elazığ
- D.270 Kırgındere village of Karayazı-Karayazı-Tutak
- D.280 D959 intersection-Bulanık-Malazgirt-Patnos-Erciş-Karahan village of Erciş (Intersection of D975)
- D.290 Erciş-Van/Bitlis province border
- D.302 Nevşehir-Ürgüp-Intersection of D300
- D.310 Pamukyazı village of Torbalı (Intersection with D550)-Tire-Ödemiş-Kiraz-Hacıaliler village of Alaşehir (Intersection with D585)
- D.320 Aydın-Sultanhisar-Nazilli-Kuyucak-Sarayköy-Denizli-Bozkurt-Çardak-Dazkırı- Dinar-Çobansaray village of Dinar (Intersection with D650)
- D.330 Turgutreis of Bodrum-Bodrum-Milas-Yatağan (From Yatağan to Muğla, it shares with D550)-Muğla-Kale-Tavas-Sarıabat village of Tavas (From Sarıabat to Yassıhöyük village of Acıpayam, it shares with D585) -Serinhisar-Yeşilova-Burdur (D650)-Isparta (D685)-Eğirdir-Gelendost-Çetince village of Yalvaç-Şarkikaraağaç (D695)-Beyşehir-Konya-Karapınar-Ereğli-Intersection of Bor (D750)-Bor-Niğde (D805)-Yeşilhisar-İncesu-Intersection with D300-Kayseri-Pınarbaşı (Intersection with D815)-Intersection with D815 (Yeşilkent village of Sarız)-Göksun (D825)-Elbistan-Darıca village of Akçadağ (Intersection with D300)
- D.340 Seydişehir (D695) – Yalıhüyük – Bozkır – Hadim – Sarıveliler – Ermenek – Mut(D715)
- D.350 Uğurlu village of Fethiye – Korkuteli – Döşemealtı (Intersection with D650) – Antalya (D650)

=== North – south reference main ===
- D.550 Edirne – Çanakkale – Edremit – İzmir – Aydın – Muğla
- D.650 Karasu – Sakarya – Bilecik – Kütahya – Afyon – Sandıklı – Burdur – Antalya
- D.750 Zonguldak – Gerede – Ankara – Aksaray – Pozantı – Tarsus
- D.850 Ünye – Tokat – Sivas – Malatya – Gaziantep – Kilis (Syria border)
- D.950 Hopa – Artvin – Erzurum – Bingöl – Diyarbakır – Mardin

=== North – south intermediate ===
- D.569 Çatalca (D020) – Büyükçekmece (D100)
- D.915 Of, Trabzon (D010) – Dernekpazarı – Çaykara – Intersection with D050 – Bayburt-Maden, Bayburt – Aşkale (D100)

== Provincial roads ==
Provincial roads (İl yolu) are under the responsibility of KGM. These are the roads that connect the central district and counties within the borders of a province to each other and to the nearby district centers of neighboring provinces, state roads, train stations, ports and airports.

These are roads other than those under the responsibility of municipalities or other institutions and bear the license plate number of that province in the road identification number's first half. (Example 35-04 List of provincial roads in Izmir Province)

== See also ==
- International E-road network
- Asian Highway Network
- List of otoyol routes in Turkey
- List of motorway tunnels in Turkey
- Transport in Turkey
