= Turkish State Highway System =

Integrated network of highways and roads in the Republic of Turkey

Devlet Yolu
- three-digit state highway marker

System information
- Maintained by Karayolları Genel Müdürlüğü
- Length: 30,974 km (2021) (19,246 mi)
- Formed: 1950

Highway names
- Devlet Yolu: D.XXX

System links
- Highways in Turkey; Motorways; List; State Highways; List

The State Highways of the Republic of Turkey (Turkish: Türkiye Cumhuriyeti Devlet Yolları) are an integrated network of highways and roads in Turkey, consisting of a numbered grid spanning across the country. They are more commonly called State roads (Turkish: Devlet yolu) and are the primary road network in Turkey. The network is mostly maintained by the General Directorate of Highways (KGM), except for within large cities (Turkish: Büyükşehir) where the responsibility is transferred to the respective city municipality. (Note: Such roads are officially removed from the routes as a result of transfers and therefore they are outside of the numbering plans.)

In the early 21st century, the network was greatly expanded to accommodate four-lane highways throughout the country. As of 2021, 19,790 km (12,300 mi) of the total 30,974 km (19,246 mi) system are four-lane highways.

== System overview ==
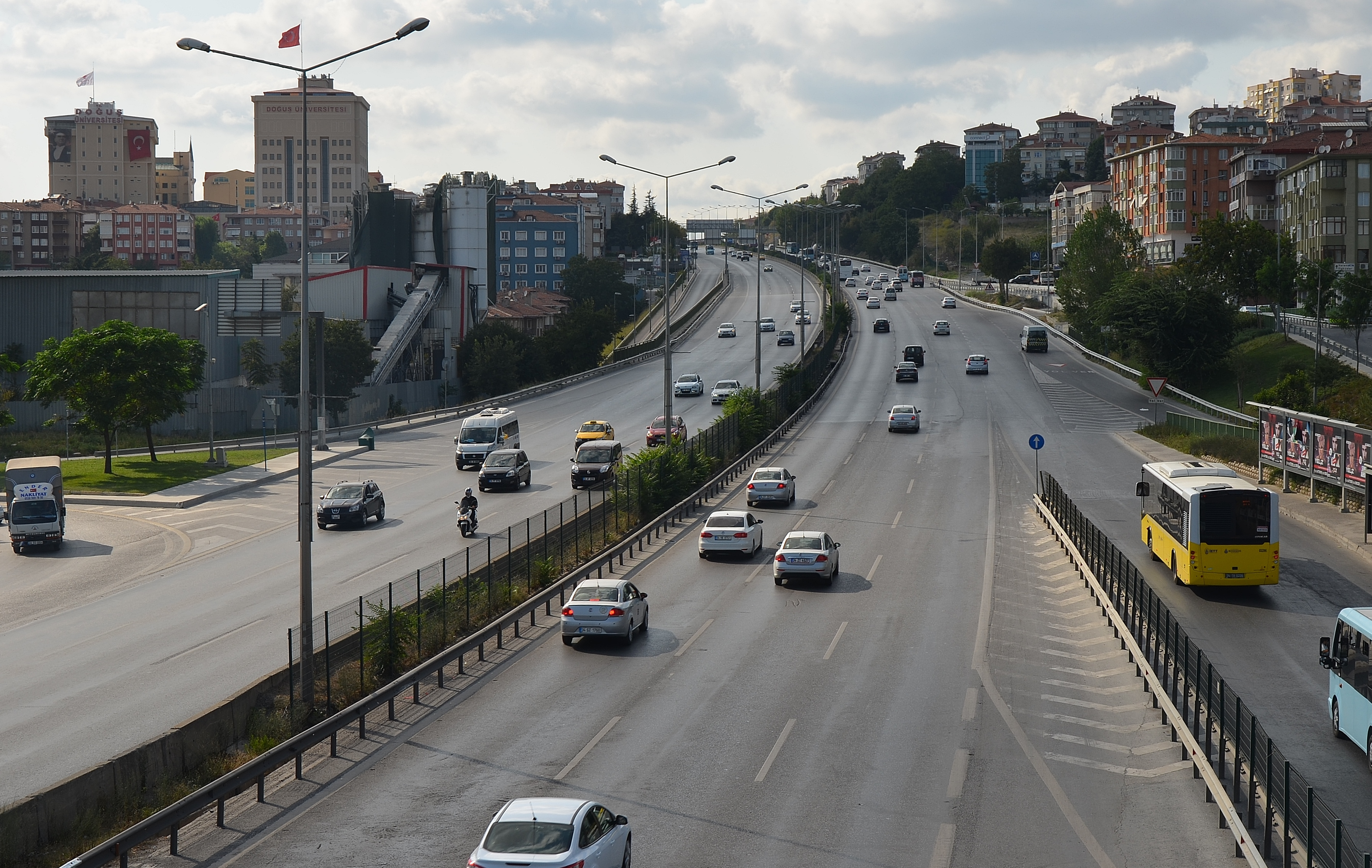
The D.100 in Kadıköy, Istanbul.

Unlike motorways in Turkey, state highways do not have a minimum design standard. Despite the majority of the system consisting of four-lane, dual highways, other routes can be two-lane highways. Some routes, especially within major cities, have been upgraded to controlled access highway standards; while other routes, such as the D.650, between Arifiye and Bozüyük, and the D.200, between Eskişehir and Ankara, consist of minimal at-grade intersections. Bridges and tunnels are common among the system, yet not as plentiful as on motorways.

=== Numbering ===
All state highways have a three-digit designation preceded by a D. The system is numbered based on direction and location. Route numbers range from 010 to 977, while 010 to 490 are east-west routes and 505 to 977 are north-south routes. Odd-numbered routes generally run north-south, while even-numbered routes generally run east-west. The only exception to this rule are four north-south routes, D.550, D.650, D.750, D.850 and D.950, that have even-number designations. The second criterion is based on the geographical location of the route. For north-south roads, routes in the west will have lower numbers, while routes in the east have higher numbers. For east-west roads, routes in the north will have lower numbers that get higher towards the south.

Main roads are designated as multiples of 100 and 50, with the exception being D.010. Multiples of 100 are main east-west roads, while multiples of 50 are main north-south roads. D.010 is the only exception to this rule.

== See also ==
- List of otoyol routes in Turkey
- Transport in Turkey
- List of highways in Turkey
- Otoyol
- List of countries by road network size Turkey, 19th
