= List of motorway tunnels in Turkey =

Below is the list of highway tunnels on Turkish motorways.

== Motorway Tunnels ==
Name	Motorway	Length (Note: Two figures wherever the lengths in two directions differ.)	Number of lanes	Province
Harp Akademileri	O-2	315 and 315 m (1,033 and 1,033 ft)	2 x 4	İstanbul
Riva	O-7	782 and 552 m (2,566 and 1,811 ft)	2 x 4	İstanbul
Çamlık	O-7	653 and 555 m (2,142 and 1,821 ft)	2 x 4	İstanbul
Çatalca-1	O-7	1,638 and 1,623 m (5,374 and 5,325 ft)	2 x 4	İstanbul
Çatalca-2	O-7	549 and 511 m (1,801 and 1,677 ft)	2 x 4	İstanbul
Cebeci	O-7	4,005 and 4,005 m (13,140 and 13,140 ft)	2 x 4	İstanbul
KMO 5. Section T1	O-7	1,406 and 1,406 m (4,613 and 4,613 ft)	2 x 4	Kocaeli
KMO 5. Section T2	O-7	4,325 and 4,325 m (14,190 and 14,190 ft)	2 x 4	Kocaeli
KMO 5. Section T3	O-7	399 and 399 m (1,309 and 1,309 ft)	2 x 4	Kocaeli
KMO 5. Section T4	O-7	2,224 and 2,224 m (7,297 and 7,297 ft)	2 x 4	Kocaeli
KMO 5. Section T5	O-7	1,479 and 1,479 m (4,852 and 4,852 ft)	2 x 4	Kocaeli
Diliskelesi	O-4	220 and 220 m (720 and 720 ft)	2 x 3	Kocaeli
Hereke	O-4	281 and 285 m (922 and 935 ft)	2 x 3	Kocaeli
İzmit Batı	O-4	435 and 290 m (1,427 and 951 ft)	2 x 2	Kocaeli
Korutepe	O-4	1,028 and 1,088 m (3,373 and 3,570 ft)	2 x 2	Kocaeli
Gültepe	O-4	639 and 584 m (2,096 and 1,916 ft)	2 x 2	Kocaeli
Mount Bolu	O-4	3,125 and 3,014 m (10,253 and 9,888 ft)	2 x 3	Bolu
Orhangazi (Samanlı)	O-5	3,586 and 3,591 m (11,765 and 11,781 ft)	2 x 3	Bursa
Selçukgazi	O-5	1,192 and 1,303 m (3,911 and 4,275 ft)	2 x 3	Bursa
Belkahve	O-5	1,556 and 1,653 m (5,105 and 5,423 ft)	2 x 3	İzmir
Bayraklı-1	O-30	320 and 317 m (1,050 and 1,040 ft)	2 x 3	İzmir
Bayraklı-2	O-30	1,865 and 1,876 m (6,119 and 6,155 ft)	2 x 3	İzmir
75.yıl Selatin	O-31	3,018 and 3,043 m (9,902 and 9,984 ft)	2 x 3	İzmir
Buruncuk	O-33	883 and 1,009 m (2,897 and 3,310 ft)	2 x 3	İzmir
İğdir	O-22	485 and 518 m (1,591 and 1,699 ft)	2 x 3	Bursa
Kırkgeçit-1	O-21	941 and 958 m (3,087 and 3,143 ft)	2 x 3	Niğde
Kırkgeçit-2	O-21	584 and 548 m (1,916 and 1,798 ft)	2 x 3	Niğde
Kırkgeçit-3	O-21	255 and 286 m (837 and 938 ft)	2 x 3	Niğde
Kırkgeçit-4	O-21	630 and 439 m (2,067 and 1,440 ft)	2 x 3	Niğde
Kırkgeçit-5	O-21	651 and 652 m (2,136 and 2,139 ft)	2 x 3	Niğde
Kırkgeçit-6	O-21	855 and 816 m (2,805 and 2,677 ft)	2 x 3	Adana
Kırkgeçit-7	O-21	534 and 526 m (1,752 and 1,726 ft)	2 x 3	Adana
Çakıt	O-21	497 and 359 m (1,631 and 1,178 ft)	2 x 3	Adana
Gülek	O-21	200 and 200 m (660 and 660 ft)	2 x 3	Mersin
Adana (Fehmi Özeltürkay)	O-51	300 and 300 m (980 and 980 ft)	2 x 3	Adana
İskenderun	O-53	200 m (660 ft)	2 x 1	Hatay
Taşoluk	O-52	376 and 376 m (1,234 and 1,234 ft)	2 x 3	Osmaniye
Ayran	O-52	560 and 596 m (1,837 and 1,955 ft)	2 x 3	Osmaniye
Kızlaç	O-52	2,851 and 2,819 m (9,354 and 9,249 ft)	2 x 3	Osmaniye
Aslanlı	O-52	1,230 and 1,225 m (4,035 and 4,019 ft)	2 x 3	Osmaniye

== Motorway Tunnels (under construction) ==
- Hatay, Dörtyol-Hassa, Amanos Tunnel (under construction) – 2 x 18,800 m
- İskenderun-Antakya Motorway, Belen T1 Motorway Tunnel (under construction) – 2 x 793m
- İskenderun-Antakya Motorway, Belen T2 Motorway Tunnel (under construction) – 2 x 8,580 m
- Çeşmeli-Kızkalesi Motorway T1 Motorway Tunnel (under construction) – 2 x 774 m
- Çeşmeli-Kızkalesi Motorway T2 Motorway Tunnel (under construction) – 2 x 4,409 m
- Çeşmeli-Kızkalesi Motorway T3 Motorway Tunnel (under construction) – 2 x 658 m
- Çeşmeli-Kızkalesi Motorway T4 Motorway Tunnel (under construction) – 2 x 156 m
- Çeşmeli-Kızkalesi Motorway T5 Motorway Tunnel (under construction) – 2 x 800 m
- Çeşmeli-Kızkalesi Motorway T6 Motorway Tunnel (under construction) – 2 x 2,592 m
- Çeşmeli-Kızkalesi Motorway T7 Motorway Tunnel (under construction) – 2 x 814 m
- Ankara-Samsun Motorway, Elmadağ-Yahşihan, T1 Motorway Tunnel (under construction) - 2 x 1.280 m
- Ankara-Samsun Motorway, Elmadağ-Yahşihan, T2 Motorway Tunnel (under construction) - 2 x 1.255 m
- Ankara-Samsun Motorway, Elmadağ-Yahşihan, T3 Motorway Tunnel (under construction) - 2 x 475 m
- Ankara-Samsun Motorway, Elmadağ-Yahşihan, T4 Motorway Tunnel (under construction) - 2 x 878 m

== Motorway Tunnels (projected) ==
- Yalova-İzmit Motorway, Yalova-Elmalık, T1 Motorway Tunnel (projected) - 2 x 942 m
- Yalova-İzmit Motorway, Yalova-Elmalık, T2 Motorway Tunnel (projected) - 2 x 1.045 m
- Yalova-İzmit Motorway, Çukurköy-Gölcük, T1 Motorway Tunnel (projected) - 2 x 480 m
- Yalova-İzmit Motorway, Çukurköy-Gölcük, T2 Motorway Tunnel (projected) - 2 x 880 m
- Yalova-İzmit Motorway, Çukurköy-Gölcük, T3 Motorway Tunnel (projected) - 2 x 1.560 m
- Yalova-İzmit Motorway, Çukurköy-Gölcük, T4 Motorway Tunnel (projected) - 2 x 3.730 m
- Yalova-İzmit Motorway, Gölcük-Bahçecik, T5 Motorway Tunnel (projected) - 2 x 830 m
- Yalova-İzmit Motorway, Bahçecik-Karatepe, T6 Motorway Tunnel (projected) - 2 x 3.155 m
- Kınalı-Balıkesir Motorway, Çorlu Cut-Cover T1 Motorway Tunnel (projected) - 2 x 500 m
- Kınalı-Balıkesir Motorway, Tekirdağ-Malkara, T2 Cut-Cover Motorway Tunnel (projected) - 2 x 500 m
- Kınalı-Balıkesir Motorway, Tekirdağ-Malkara, T1 Motorway Tunnel (projected) - 2 x 1.038 m
- Kınalı-Balıkesir Motorway, Lapseki-Çan, T2 Motorway Tunnel (projected) - 2 x 895 m
- Kınalı-Balıkesir Motorway, Lapseki-Çan, T3 Motorway Tunnel (projected) - 2 x 1.830 m
- Kınalı-Balıkesir Motorway, Çan-Yenice, T4 Motorway Tunnel (projected) - 2 x 990 m
- Kınalı-Balıkesir Motorway, Yenice-Balya, T5 Motorway Tunnel (projected) - 2 x 2.045 m
- Ankara-Samsun Motorway, Merzifon-Havza, T5 Motorway Tunnel (projected) - 2 x 6.600 m
- Ankara-Samsun Motorway, Merzifon-Havza, T6 Motorway Tunnel (projected) - 2 x 855 m
- Ankara-Samsun Motorway, Havza-Samsun, T7 Motorway Tunnel (projected) - 2 x 2.965 m
- Ankara-Samsun Motorway, Havza-Samsun, T8 Motorway Tunnel (projected) - 2 x 565 m
- Ankara-Samsun Motorway, Havza-Samsun, T9 Motorway Tunnel (projected) - 2 x 1.935 m
- Bafra-Samsun-Ünye Motorway, Bafra-Samsun, T1 Motorway Tunnel (projected) – 2 x 1,240 m
- Bafra-Samsun-Ünye Motorway, Bafra-Samsun, T2 Motorway Tunnel (projected) – 2 x 3,540 m
- Bafra-Samsun-Ünye Motorway, Bafra-Samsun, T3 Motorway Tunnel (projected) – 2 x 480 m
- Bafra-Samsun-Ünye Motorway, Bafra-Samsun, T4 Motorway Tunnel (projected) – 2 x 1,600 m
- Bafra-Samsun-Ünye Motorway, Bafra-Samsun, T5 Motorway Tunnel (projected) – 2 x 1,300 m
- Bafra-Samsun-Ünye Motorway, Bafra-Samsun, T6 Motorway Tunnel (projected) – 2 x 1,000 m
- Bafra-Samsun-Ünye Motorway, Bafra-Samsun, T7 Motorway Tunnel (projected) – 2 x 1,000 m
- Bafra-Samsun-Ünye Motorway, Bafra-Samsun, T8 Motorway Tunnel (projected) – 2 x 1,320 m
- Bafra-Samsun-Ünye Motorway, Bafra-Samsun, T9 Motorway Tunnel (projected) – 2 x 2,360 m
- Bafra-Samsun-Ünye Motorway, Samsun-Ünye, T10 Motorway Tunnel (projected) – 2 x 440 m
- Bafra-Samsun-Ünye Motorway, Samsun-Ünye, T11 Motorway Tunnel (projected) – 2 x 2,360 m
- Bafra-Samsun-Ünye Motorway, Samsun-Ünye, T12 Motorway Tunnel (projected) – 2 x 4,400 m
- Bafra-Samsun-Ünye Motorway, Samsun-Ünye, T13 Motorway Tunnel (projected) – 2 x 5,540 m
- Bafra-Samsun-Ünye Motorway, Samsun-Ünye, T14 Motorway Tunnel (projected) – 2 x 440 m
- Bafra-Samsun-Ünye Motorway, Samsun-Ünye, T15 Motorway Tunnel (projected) – 2 x 380 m
- Bafra-Samsun-Ünye Motorway, Samsun-Ünye, T16 Motorway Tunnel (projected) – 2 x 1,320 m
- Afyon-Antalya Motorway, BurdurNorth-BurdurSouth, T1 (Burdur) Motorway Tunnel (projected) - 2 x 1.615 m
- Afyon-Antalya Motorway, BurdurNorth-BurdurSouth, T2 (MAKÜ) Motorway Tunnel (projected) - 2 x 1.585 m
- Afyon-Antalya Motorway, Burdur-Bucak, T3 Motorway Tunnel (projected) - 2 x 2.000 m
- Afyon-Antalya Motorway, Burdur-Bucak, T4 Motorway Tunnel (projected) - 2 x 865 m
- Afyon-Antalya Motorway, Burdur-Bucak, T5 Motorway Tunnel (projected) - 2 x 580 m
- Afyon-Antalya Motorway, Burdur-Bucak, T6 Motorway Tunnel (projected) - 2 x 1.145 m
- Afyon-Antalya Motorway, Burdur-Bucak, T7 Motorway Tunnel (projected) - 2 x 1.930 m
- Afyon-Antalya Motorway, Bucak-Antalya, T8 Motorway Tunnel (projected) - 2 x 1.185 m
- Afyon-Antalya Motorway, Bucak-Antalya, T9 Motorway Tunnel (projected) - 2 x 310 m
- Afyon-Antalya Motorway, Bucak-Antalya, T10 Motorway Tunnel (projected) - 2 x 1.855 m
- Afyon-Antalya Motorway, Bucak-Antalya, T11 Motorway Tunnel (projected) - 2 x 400 m
- Antalya-Alanya Motorway, Antalya-Taşağıl, T1 Motorway Tunnel (projected) - 2 x 1.070 m
- Antalya-Alanya Motorway, Antalya-Taşağıl, T2 Motorway Tunnel (projected) - 2 x 1.680 m
- Antalya-Alanya Motorway, Antalya-Taşağıl, T3 Motorway Tunnel (projected) - 2 x 1.080 m
- Antalya-Alanya Motorway, Antalya-Taşağıl, T4 Motorway Tunnel (projected) - 2 x 2.220 m
- Antalya-Alanya Motorway, Taşağıl-Manavgat, T5 Motorway Tunnel (projected) - 2 x 560 m
- Antalya-Alanya Motorway, Manavgat T6 Motorway Tunnel (projected) - 2 x 875 m
- Antalya-Alanya Motorway, Manavgat-Alarahan, T7 Motorway Tunnel (projected) - 2 x 805 m
- Antalya-Alanya Motorway, Alarahan-Konaklı, T8 Motorway Tunnel (projected) - 2 x 2.965 m
- Antalya-Alanya Motorway, Konaklı-Alanya, T9 Motorway Tunnel (projected) - 2 x 6.715 m
- Antalya-Alanya Motorway, Konaklı-Alanya, T10 Motorway Tunnel (projected) - 2 x 4.440 m
- Denizli-Burdur Motorway, Honaz-Çardak, T1 Motorway Tunnel (projected) - 2 x 770 m
- Denizli-Burdur Motorway, Çardak-Burdur, T2 Motorway Tunnel (projected) - 2 x 4.385 m
- Denizli-Burdur Motorway, Çardak-Burdur, T3 Motorway Tunnel (projected) - 2 x 3.115 m
- Denizli-Burdur Motorway, Burdur-Bucak, T4 Motorway Tunnel (projected) - 2 x 2.220 m
- Gerede-Gürbulak Motorway, Gerede-Merzifon Section, Gerede-Eskipazar, T1 Motorway Tunnel (projected) - 2 x 3.130 m
- Gerede-Gürbulak Motorway, Gerede-Merzifon Section, Gerede-Eskipazar, T2 Motorway Tunnel (projected) - 2 x 260 m
- Gerede-Gürbulak Motorway, Gerede-Merzifon Section, Eskipazar-Çerkeş, T3 Motorway Tunnel (projected) - 2 x 4.080 m
- Gerede-Gürbulak Motorway, Gerede-Merzifon Section, Eskipazar-Çerkeş, T4 Motorway Tunnel (projected) - 2 x 345 m
- Gerede-Gürbulak Motorway, Gerede-Merzifon Section, Kurşunlu-Ilgaz, T5 Motorway Tunnel (projected) - 2 x 1.570 m
- Gerede-Gürbulak Motorway, Gerede-Merzifon Section, Ilgaz-Tosya, T6 Motorway Tunnel (projected) - 2 x 140 m
- Gerede-Gürbulak Motorway, Gerede-Merzifon Section, Ilgaz-Tosya, T7 Motorway Tunnel (projected) - 2 x 515 m
- Gerede-Gürbulak Motorway, Gerede-Merzifon Section, Ilgaz-Tosya, T8 Motorway Tunnel (projected) - 2 x 1.205 m
- Gerede-Gürbulak Motorway, Gerede-Merzifon Section, Ilgaz-Tosya, T9 Motorway Tunnel (projected) - 2 x 625 m
- Gerede-Gürbulak Motorway, Gerede-Merzifon Section, Ilgaz-Tosya, T10 Motorway Tunnel (projected) - 2 x 370 m
- Gerede-Gürbulak Motorway, Gerede-Merzifon Section, Kargı-Osmancık, T11 Motorway Tunnel (projected) - 2 x 1.000 m
- Gerede-Gürbulak Motorway, Gerede-Merzifon Section, Kargı-Osmancık, T12 Motorway Tunnel (projected) - 2 x 940 m
- Gerede-Gürbulak Motorway, Gerede-Merzifon Section, Kargı-Osmancık, T13 Motorway Tunnel (projected) - 2 x 650 m
- Gerede-Gürbulak Motorway, Gerede-Merzifon Section, Kargı-Osmancık, T14 Motorway Tunnel (projected) - 2 x 325 m
- Gerede-Gürbulak Motorway, Gerede-Merzifon Section, Kargı-Osmancık, T15 Motorway Tunnel (projected) - 2 x 915 m
- Gerede-Gürbulak Motorway, Gerede-Merzifon Section, Kargı-Osmancık, T16 Motorway Tunnel (projected) - 2 x 5.450 m
- Gerede-Gürbulak Motorway, Gerede-Merzifon Section, Kargı-Osmancık, T17 Motorway Tunnel (projected) - 2 x 2.805 m
- Gerede-Gürbulak Motorway, Gerede-Merzifon Section, Kargı-Osmancık, T18 Motorway Tunnel (projected) - 2 x 465 m
- Gerede-Gürbulak Motorway, Gerede-Merzifon Section, Kargı-Osmancık, T19 Motorway Tunnel (projected) - 2 x 870 m
- Gerede-Gürbulak Motorway, Gerede-Merzifon Section, Kargı-Osmancık, T20 Motorway Tunnel (projected) - 2 x 855 m
- Gerede-Gürbulak Motorway, Gerede-Merzifon Section, Kargı-Osmancık, T21 Motorway Tunnel (projected) - 2 x 3.795 m
- Gerede-Gürbulak Motorway, Gerede-Merzifon Section, Kargı-Osmancık, T22 Motorway Tunnel (projected) - 2 x 2.515 m
- Gerede-Gürbulak Motorway, Gerede-Merzifon Section, Kargı-Osmancık, T23 Motorway Tunnel (projected) - 2 x 4.035 m
- Gerede-Gürbulak Motorway, Merzifon-Koyulhisar Section, Amasya T1 Motorway Tunnel (projected) - 2 x 472 m
- Gerede-Gürbulak Motorway, Merzifon-Koyulhisar Section, Amasya T2 Motorway Tunnel (projected) - 2 x 3.091 m
- Gerede-Gürbulak Motorway, Merzifon-Koyulhisar Section, Amasya T3 Motorway Tunnel (projected) - 2 x 730 m
- Gerede-Gürbulak Motorway, Merzifon-Koyulhisar Section, Amasya T4 Motorway Tunnel (projected) - 2 x 304 m
- Gerede-Gürbulak Motorway, Merzifon-Koyulhisar Section, Amasya T5 Motorway Tunnel (projected) - 2 x 1.281 m
- Gerede-Gürbulak Motorway, Merzifon-Koyulhisar Section, Turhal T6 Motorway Tunnel (projected) - 2 x 1.221 m
- Gerede-Gürbulak Motorway, Merzifon-Koyulhisar Section, Turhal T7 Motorway Tunnel (projected) - 2 x 1.202 m
- Gerede-Gürbulak Motorway, Merzifon-Koyulhisar Section, Turhal T8 Motorway Tunnel (projected) - 2 x 2.500 m
- Gerede-Gürbulak Motorway, Merzifon-Koyulhisar Section, Turhal T9 Motorway Tunnel (projected) - 2 x 368 m
- Gerede-Gürbulak Motorway, Merzifon-Koyulhisar Section, Turhal T10 Motorway Tunnel (projected) - 2 x 2.113 m
- Gerede-Gürbulak Motorway, Merzifon-Koyulhisar Section, Turhal T11 Motorway Tunnel (projected) - 2 x 3.710 m
- Gerede-Gürbulak Motorway, Merzifon-Koyulhisar Section, Tokat T12 Motorway Tunnel (projected) - 2 x 3.217 m
- Gerede-Gürbulak Motorway, Merzifon-Koyulhisar Section, Tokat T13 Motorway Tunnel (projected) - 2 x 1.036 m
- Gerede-Gürbulak Motorway, Merzifon-Koyulhisar Section, Tokat T14 Motorway Tunnel (projected) - 2 x 5.525 m
- Gerede-Gürbulak Motorway, Merzifon-Koyulhisar Section, Almus T15 Motorway Tunnel (projected) - 2 x 3.160 m
- Gerede-Gürbulak Motorway, Merzifon-Koyulhisar Section, Almus T16 Motorway Tunnel (projected) - 2 x 2.119 m
- Gerede-Gürbulak Motorway, Merzifon-Koyulhisar Section, Almus T17 Motorway Tunnel (projected) - 2 x 2.697 m
- Gerede-Gürbulak Motorway, Merzifon-Koyulhisar Section, Almus T18 Motorway Tunnel (projected) - 2 x 4.048 m
- Gerede-Gürbulak Motorway, Merzifon-Koyulhisar Section, Reşadiye T19 Motorway Tunnel (projected) - 2 x 799 m
- Gerede-Gürbulak Motorway, Merzifon-Koyulhisar Section, Reşadiye T20 Motorway Tunnel (projected) - 2 x 473 m
- Gerede-Gürbulak Motorway, Merzifon-Koyulhisar Section, Reşadiye T21 Motorway Tunnel (projected) - 2 x 363 m
- Gerede-Gürbulak Motorway, Merzifon-Koyulhisar Section, Reşadiye T22 Motorway Tunnel (projected) - 2 x 762 m
- Gerede-Gürbulak Motorway, Merzifon-Koyulhisar Section, Reşadiye T23 Motorway Tunnel (projected) - 2 x 323 m
- Gerede-Gürbulak Motorway, Merzifon-Koyulhisar Section, Reşadiye T24 Motorway Tunnel (projected) - 2 x 344 m
- Gerede-Gürbulak Motorway, Merzifon-Koyulhisar Section, Doğanşar T25 Motorway Tunnel (projected) - 2 x 7.788 m
- Gerede-Gürbulak Motorway, Merzifon-Koyulhisar Section, Koyulhisar T26 Motorway Tunnel (projected) - 2 x 1.520 m
- Gerede-Gürbulak Motorway, Merzifon-Koyulhisar Section, Koyulhisar T27 Motorway Tunnel (projected) - 2 x 849 m
- Gerede-Gürbulak Motorway, Merzifon-Koyulhisar Section, Koyulhisar T28 Motorway Tunnel (projected) - 2 x 706 m
- Gerede-Gürbulak Motorway, Merzifon-Koyulhisar Section, Koyulhisar T29 Motorway Tunnel (projected) - 2 x 849 m
- Gerede-Gürbulak Motorway, Merzifon-Koyulhisar Section, Koyulhisar T30 Motorway Tunnel (projected) - 2 x 1.583 m
- Gerede-Gürbulak Motorway, Koyulhisar-Pülümür Section, Koyulhisar-Suşehri, T1 Motorway Tunnel (projected) - 2 x 2.750 m
- Gerede-Gürbulak Motorway, Koyulhisar-Pülümür Section, Koyulhisar-Suşehri, T2 Motorway Tunnel (projected) - 2 x 4.550 m
- Gerede-Gürbulak Motorway, Koyulhisar-Pülümür Section, Koyulhisar-Suşehri, T3 Motorway Tunnel (projected) - 2 x 8.000 m
- Gerede-Gürbulak Motorway, Koyulhisar-Pülümür Section, Gölova-Sivas, T4 Motorway Tunnel (projected) - 2 x 1.600 m
- Gerede-Gürbulak Motorway, Koyulhisar-Pülümür Section, Gölova-Sivas, T5 Motorway Tunnel (projected) - 2 x 4.300 m
- Gerede-Gürbulak Motorway, Koyulhisar-Pülümür Section, Sivas-Refahiye, T6 Motorway Tunnel (projected) - 2 x 4.900 m
- Gerede-Gürbulak Motorway, Koyulhisar-Pülümür Section, Refahiye-Kemah, T7 Motorway Tunnel (projected) - 2 x 2.100 m
- Gerede-Gürbulak Motorway, Koyulhisar-Pülümür Section, Refahiye-Kemah, T8 Motorway Tunnel (projected) - 2 x 2.350 m
- Gerede-Gürbulak Motorway, Koyulhisar-Pülümür Section, Refahiye-Kemah, T9 Motorway Tunnel (projected) - 2 x 3.100 m
- Gerede-Gürbulak Motorway, Koyulhisar-Pülümür Section, Refahiye-Kemah, T10 Motorway Tunnel (projected) - 2 x 4.250 m
- Gerede-Gürbulak Motorway, Koyulhisar-Pülümür Section, Refahiye-Kemah, T11 Motorway Tunnel (projected) - 2 x 450 m
- Gerede-Gürbulak Motorway, Koyulhisar-Pülümür Section, Refahiye-Kemah, T12 Motorway Tunnel (projected) - 2 x 4.200 m
- Gerede-Gürbulak Motorway, Koyulhisar-Pülümür Section, Refahiye-Kemah, T13 Motorway Tunnel (projected) - 2 x 6.350 m
- Gerede-Gürbulak Motorway, Koyulhisar-Pülümür Section, Kemah-Erzincan, T14 Motorway Tunnel (projected) - 2 x 1.000 m
- Gerede-Gürbulak Motorway, Koyulhisar-Pülümür Section, Kemah-Erzincan, T15 Motorway Tunnel (projected) - 2 x 250 m
- Gerede-Gürbulak Motorway, Koyulhisar-Pülümür Section, Kemah-Erzincan, T16 Motorway Tunnel (projected) - 2 x 800 m
- Gerede-Gürbulak Motorway, Koyulhisar-Pülümür Section, Kemah-Erzincan, T17 Motorway Tunnel (projected) - 2 x 750 m
- Gerede-Gürbulak Motorway, Koyulhisar-Pülümür Section, Kemah-Erzincan, T18 Motorway Tunnel (projected) - 2 x 400 m
- Gerede-Gürbulak Motorway, Koyulhisar-Pülümür Section, Kemah-Erzincan, T19 Motorway Tunnel (projected) - 2 x 600 m
- Gerede-Gürbulak Motorway, Koyulhisar-Pülümür Section, Kemah-Erzincan, T20 Motorway Tunnel (projected) - 2 x 200 m
- Gerede-Gürbulak Motorway, Koyulhisar-Pülümür Section, Kemah-Erzincan, T21 Motorway Tunnel (projected) - 2 x 500 m
- Gerede-Gürbulak Motorway, Koyulhisar-Pülümür Section, Kemah-Erzincan, T22 Motorway Tunnel (projected) - 2 x 5.710 m
- Gerede-Gürbulak Motorway, Koyulhisar-Pülümür Section, Erzincan-Pülümür, T23 Motorway Tunnel (projected) - 2 x 7.960 m
- Gerede-Gürbulak Motorway, Koyulhisar-Pülümür Section, Erzincan-Pülümür, T24 Motorway Tunnel (projected) - 2 x 5.600 m
- Gerede-Gürbulak Motorway, Koyulhisar-Pülümür Section, Erzincan-Pülümür, T25 Motorway Tunnel (projected) - 2 x 3.020 m
- Gerede-Gürbulak Motorway, Pülümür-Horasan Section, Pülümür-Kargın, T1 Motorway Tunnel (projected) - 2 x 4.500 m
- Gerede-Gürbulak Motorway, Pülümür-Horasan Section, Tercan-Aşkale, T2 Motorway Tunnel (projected) - 2 x 4.000 m
- Gerede-Gürbulak Motorway, Pülümür-Horasan Section, Tercan-Aşkale, T3 Motorway Tunnel (projected) - 2 x 1.750 m
- Gerede-Gürbulak Motorway, Pülümür-Horasan Section, Tercan-Aşkale, T4 Motorway Tunnel (projected) - 2 x 4.400 m
- Gerede-Gürbulak Motorway, Pülümür-Horasan Section, Tercan-Aşkale, T5 Motorway Tunnel (projected) - 2 x 2.600 m
- Gerede-Gürbulak Motorway, Pülümür-Horasan Section, Tercan-Aşkale, T6 Motorway Tunnel (projected) - 2 x 1.500 m
- Gerede-Gürbulak Motorway, Pülümür-Horasan Section, Tercan-Aşkale, T7 Motorway Tunnel (projected) - 2 x 1.450 m
- Gerede-Gürbulak Motorway, Pülümür-Horasan Section, Tercan-Aşkale, T8 Motorway Tunnel (projected) - 2 x 5.350 m
- Gerede-Gürbulak Motorway, Pülümür-Horasan Section, Erzurum-Pasinler, T9 Motorway Tunnel (projected) - 2 x 5.700 m
- Gerede-Gürbulak Motorway, Horasan-Gürbulak Section, Horasan-Eleşkirt, T1 Motorway Tunnel (projected) - 2 x 1.600 m
- Ankara-İzmir Motorway, Sivrihisar T1 Motorway Tunnel (projected) - 2 x 2.929 m
- Ankara-İzmir Motorway, Çifteler-Seyitgazi, T2 (Börüklü) Motorway Tunnel (projected) - 2 x 1.255
- Ankara-İzmir Motorway, Seyitgazi-Altıntaş, T3 Motorway Tunnel (projected) - 2 x 1.061 m
- Ankara-İzmir Motorway, Seyitgazi-Altıntaş, T4 Motorway Tunnel (projected) - 2 x 2.688 m
- Ankara-İzmir Motorway, Dumlupınar-Banaz, T5 Motorway Tunnel (projected) - 2 x 3.757 m
- Ankara-İzmir Motorway, Uşak-Kula, T6 Motorway Tunnel (projected) - 2 x 2.700 m
- Ankara-İzmir Motorway, Uşak-Kula, T7 Motorway Tunnel (projected) - 2 x 1.728 m
- Ankara-İzmir Motorway, Kula T8 Motorway Tunnel (projected) - 2 x 2.823 m
- Ankara-İzmir Motorway, Kula-Adala(Salihli), T9 Motorway Tunnel (projected) - 2 x 4.637 m
- Ankara-İzmir Motorway, Adala(Salihli)-Gölmarmara, T10 Motorway Tunnel (projected) - 2 x 3.069 m
- Ankara-İzmir Motorway, Gölmarmara-Ahmetli, T11 Motorway Tunnel (projected) - 2 x 2.770 m
- Ankara-İzmir Motorway, Ahmetli-Turgutlu, T12 Motorway Tunnel (projected) - 2 x 857 m
- İzmir 2. Ring Road, T1 Motorway Tunnel (projected) – 2 x 1,280 m
- İzmir 2. Ring Road, T2 Motorway Tunnel (projected) – 2 x 3,230 m
- İzmir 2. Ring Road, T3 Motorway Tunnel (projected) – 2 x 1,656 m
- İzmir 2. Ring Road, T4 Motorway Tunnel (projected) – 2 x 447 m
- İzmir 2. Ring Road, T5 Motorway Tunnel (projected) – 2 x 2,555 m
- İzmir 2. Ring Road, T6 Motorway Tunnel (projected) – 2 x 2,027 m
- İzmir 2. Ring Road, T7 Motorway Tunnel (projected) – 2 x 1,390 m
- İzmir 2. Ring Road, T8 Motorway Tunnel (projected) – 2 x 1,570 m
- İzmir 2. Ring Road, T9 Motorway Tunnel (projected) – 2 x 4,070 m
- İzmir 2. Ring Road, T10 Motorway Tunnel (projected) – 2 x 1,062 m
- İzmir 2. Ring Road, Cut-Cover Motorway Tunnel (projected) – 2 x 963 m
- İzmir Ring Road - İZKARAY Subsea Road-Rail Tunnel (projected) - 3 x 1.797 m
- Sivrihisar-Bursa Motorway, Bozüyük-Pekmezli, T1 Cut-Cover Motorway Tunnel (projected) - 2 x 670 m
- Sivrihisar-Bursa Motorway, Bozüyük-Pekmezli, T2 Motorway Tunnel (projected) - 2 x 3.560 m
- Çeşmeli-Taşucu Motorway, Silifke Motorway Tunnel (projected) - 2 x 1.570 m
- Şanlıurfa-Habur Motorway, T1 Motorway Tunnel (projected) - 2 x 1.487 m
- Şanlıurfa-Habur Motorway, T2 Cut-Cover Motorway Tunnel (projected) - 2 x 890 m
- Bursa Northern Ring Road, Ovaaakça Motorway Tunnel (projected) – 2 x 2,144 m
- Bursa Northern Ring Road, Çağrışan Motorway Tunnel (projected) – 2 x 349 m
- Bursa Northern Ring Road, Bademli Motorway Tunnel (projected) – 2 x 670 m
- Adana Northern Ring Road, T1 Motorway Tunnel (projected) – 2 x 1,670 m
- Adana Northern Ring Road, T2 Motorway Tunnel (projected) – 2 x 690 m
- Adana Northern Ring Road, T3 Motorway Tunnel (projected) – 2 x 880 m
- Adana Northern Ring Road, T4 Motorway Tunnel (projected) – 2 x 350 m
- Adana Northern Ring Road, T5 (Toros) Motorway Tunnel (projected) – 2 x 12,090 m
- Adana Northern Ring Road, T6 Motorway Tunnel (projected) – 2 x 470 m
- Adana Northern Ring Road, T7 Motorway Tunnel (projected) – 2 x 600 m
- Adana Northern Ring Road, T8 Motorway Tunnel (projected) – 2 x 480 m
- Adana Northern Ring Road, T9 Motorway Tunnel (projected) – 2 x 2,380 m
