= Ayran Tunnel (motorway) =

Tunnel in Osmaniye Province, Turkey

Ayran Tunnel Ayran Tüneli
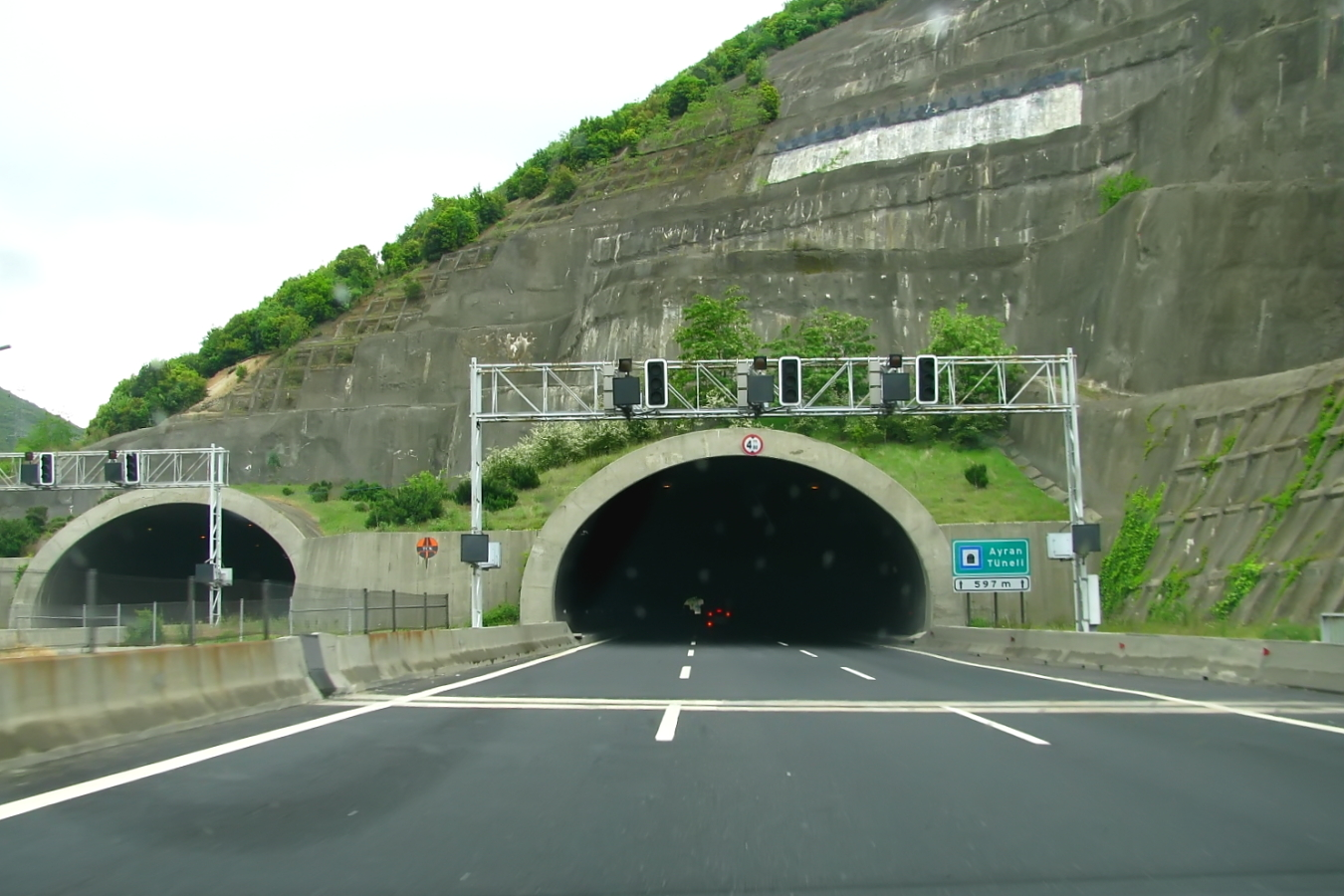
- Interactive map of Ayran Tunnel; Ayran Tüneli

Overview
- Location: Arıcaklı, Bahçe, Osmaniye, Turkey
- Coordinates: 37°11′01″N 36°36′55″E Location of Ayran Tunnel in Turkey
- Status: Operational
- Route: O-52 E90 AH84

Operation
- Constructed: Tekfen
- Opened: 1999; 27 years ago
- Operator: General Directorate of Highways
- Traffic: automotive

Technical
- Length: 560 and 596 m (1,837 and 1,955 ft)
- No. of lanes: 2 x 3
- Operating speed: 80 km/h (50 mph)

The Ayran Tunnel (Turkish: Ayran Tüneli), is a motorway tunnel constructed on the Adana–Şanlıurfa motorway O-52 E90 AH84 in Osmaniye Province, southern Turkey.

It is situated on the Taurus Mountains near Arıcaklı village of Bahçe, Osmaniye. The 560 and 596 m (1,837 and 1,955 ft)-long twin-tube tunnel carrying three lanes of traffic in each direction is flanked by 376–376 m (1,234–1,234 ft)-long Taşoluk Tunnel in the west and 2,851–2,819 m (9,354–9,249 ft)-long Kızlaç Tunnel in the east on the same motorway. Dangerous goods carriers are not permitted to use the tunnel.

The tunnel was constructed by Tekfen in New Austrian Tunnelling method (NATM).

== See also ==
- List of motorway tunnels in Turkey
