= Sani Konukoğlu Boulevard =

- Maintained by: Antep Metropolitan Municipality and General Directorate of Highways outside Gaziantep
- Length: 12.2 km (7.6 mi)

Construction
- Commissioned: 1950s

The Sani Konukoğlu Boulevard (Turkish: Sani Konukoğlu Bulvarı) is a major thoroughfare running through Gaziantep, Turkey's eighth most-populous city. Built with the old highway to Urfa, it is on the Turkish state roadway D400, with short portion being on D850. Before the building of the motorway Otoyol 52, the trucks going to the Near East via Iraqi Kurdistan, were passed through this thoroughfare. With the building of the new six-lane motorway, trucks going to Iraqi Kurdistan direction are now going via that motorway. Dolmuş (dolmush) and city buses and halk otobüsü buses are running on this boulevard day by day. Up to the early 1990s, the boulevard was on the E24, which went from Antalya to Habur border gate in the Iraqi border. After UNECE's change of road numbers to the present system, it became E90.

== See also ==
- Birecik Bridge
- Euphrates Viaduct
- Gaziantep
