= Ayran Tunnel =

Ayran Tunnel is the name of two separate tunnels running through the Nur Mountains in southern Turkey:

- Ayran Tunnel (railway), a railway tunnel built by the Berlin–Baghdad railway between 1908 and 1917.
- Ayran Tunnel (motorway), a tunnel carrying the O-52, built in 1999
