= Aslanlı Tunnel =

Road tunnel in Turkey

Aslanlı Tunnel Aslanlı Tüneli
- Interactive map of Aslanlı Tunnel; Aslanlı Tüneli

Overview
- Location: Nurdağı, Gaziantep Province, Turkey
- Coordinates: 37°09′55″N 36°40′34″E Location of Aslanlı Tunnel in Turkey
- Status: Operational
- Route: O-52 E90 AH84

Operation
- Constructed: Tekfen
- Opened: 1999; 27 years ago
- Operator: General Directorate of Highways
- Traffic: automotive

Technical
- Length: 1,230 and 1,225 m (4,035 and 4,019 ft)
- No. of lanes: 2 x 3
- Operating speed: 80 km/h (50 mph)

The Aslanlı Tunnel (Turkish: Aslanlı Tüneli), is a motorway tunnel constructed on the Adana–Şanlıurfa motorway O-52 E90 AH84 in Gaziantep Province, southern Turkey.

It is situated close to the provincial border of Gaziantep to Osmaniye in Nurdağı district. The 1,230 and 1,225 m (4,035 and 4,019 ft)-long twin-tube tunnel carrying three lanes of traffic in each direction follows the Kızlaç Tunnel in northeast direction. Dangerous goods carriers are not permitted to use the tunnel.

The tunnel was constructed by Tekfen in New Austrian Tunnelling method (NATM).

== See also ==
- List of motorway tunnels in Turkey
