= Seyhan Viaduct =

Bridge in Turkey

Seyhan Viaduct Seyhan Viyadüğü
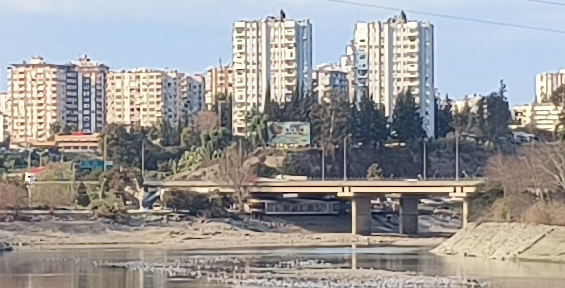
- Coordinates: 37.0127°N 35.1927°E
- Carries: 6 lanes of
- Crosses: Seyhan River
- Locale: Seyhan and Yüreğir, Adana
- Named for: Seyhan river
- Owner: Karayolları Genel Müdürlüğü

Characteristics
- Design: Box-girder bridge
- Total length: 470 m (1,540 ft)

History
- Construction end: 1992

Statistics
- Daily traffic: 34,241 (2014)

The Seyhan Viaduct (Turkish: Seyhan Viyadüğü) is a 470-metre-long (1,540 ft) box-girder bridge that carries the O-51 motorway across the Seyhan River in Adana, Turkey. The bridge is the northernmost crossing of the river before the Seyhan Dam, just upstream.

The Pozant-Adana-İskenderun highway initially included the 1992-completed Seyhan Viaduct. Once completed, the route was re-designated as the Adana Beltway (O-50) and has recently been re-designated again, after the O-50 was replaced by the O-51 and O-52.
