= Kızlaç Tunnel =

Adana–Şanlıurfa motorway tunnel

Kızlaç Tunnel Kızlaç Tüneli
- Interactive map of Kızlaç Tunnel; Kızlaç Tüneli

Overview
- Location: Kızlaç, Bahçe, Osmaniye, Turkey
- Coordinates: 37°10′13″N 36°38′15″E Location of Kızlaç Tunnel in Turkey
- Status: Operational
- Route: O-52 E90 AH84

Operation
- Constructed: Tekfen
- Opened: 1999; 27 years ago
- Operator: General Directorate of Highways
- Traffic: automotive

Technical
- Length: 2,851 and 2,819 m (9,354 and 9,249 ft)
- No. of lanes: 2 x 3
- Operating speed: 80 km/h (50 mph)

The Kızlaç Tunnel (Turkish: Kızlaç Tüneli), is a motorway tunnel constructed on the Adana–Şanlıurfa motorway O-52 E90 AH84 in Osmaniye Province, southern Turkey.

It is situated on the Taurus Mountains near Kızlaç village of Bahçe, Osmaniye. The 2,851 and 2,819 m (9,354 and 9,249 ft)-long twin-tube tunnel carrying three lanes of traffic in each direction is flanked by 596–596 m (1,955–1,955 ft)-long Ayran Tunnel in the west and 1,230–1,225 m (4,035–4,019 ft)-long Aslanlı Tunnel in the east on the same motorway. Dangerous goods carriers are not permitted to use the tunnel.

The tunnel was constructed by Tekfen in New Austrian Tunnelling method (NATM).

== See also ==
- List of motorway tunnels in Turkey
