= E89 =

E89 may refer to:

- BMW Z4 (E89)
- European route E89
- King's Indian Defense, Encyclopedia of Chess Openings code
- Second Keihan Highway, route E89 in Japan
