= E88 =

E88 can refer to:

- European route E88, a road
- A variation of the King's Indian Defence, Sämisch Variation, Encyclopaedia of Chess Openings code
- Keiji Bypass, route E88 in Japan
