= Otoyol 50 =

Highway in Turkey

O-50
- Adana Beltway; Adana Çevreyolu

Route information
- Part of E90 / AH84
- Length: 22.5 km (14.0 mi)
- Existed: 1992–present

Major junctions
- From: O-51 at Kuyumcular, Adana

- To: O-52 at Yıldırım Beyazıt Mah., Adana

Location
- Country: Turkey
- Regions: Mediterranean
- Provinces: Adana Province
- Major cities: Adana

Highway system
- Highways in Turkey; Motorways; List; State Highways; List

Otoyol 50 (English: Motorway 50), abbreviated as O-50, a.k.a. Adana Çevreyolu (English: Adana Beltway), was the former designation for the 22 km (14 mi) long motorway passing through the city of Adana, Turkey. In the 2014 the KGM resigned the section of motorway west of the Seyhan River as the O-51 and the section east of the Seyhan River as O-52. Thus extending the O-52 and O-51 into central Adana.

It started in the west of Adana at eastern terminus of Adana-Erdemli Motorway O-51, running north of the city, and ending northeast of Adana connecting to Adana-Şanlıurfa Motorway O-52. O-50 had a full length of 23 km (14 mi). It was also a part of the European route E90 and the international Asian Highway 84. The Adana Beltway is still a toll-free motorway.

== See also ==
- List of highways in Turkey
- List of motorways in Turkey
