= Hereke Tunnel =

Motorway tunnel in Turkey

Hereke Tunnel Hereke Tüneli
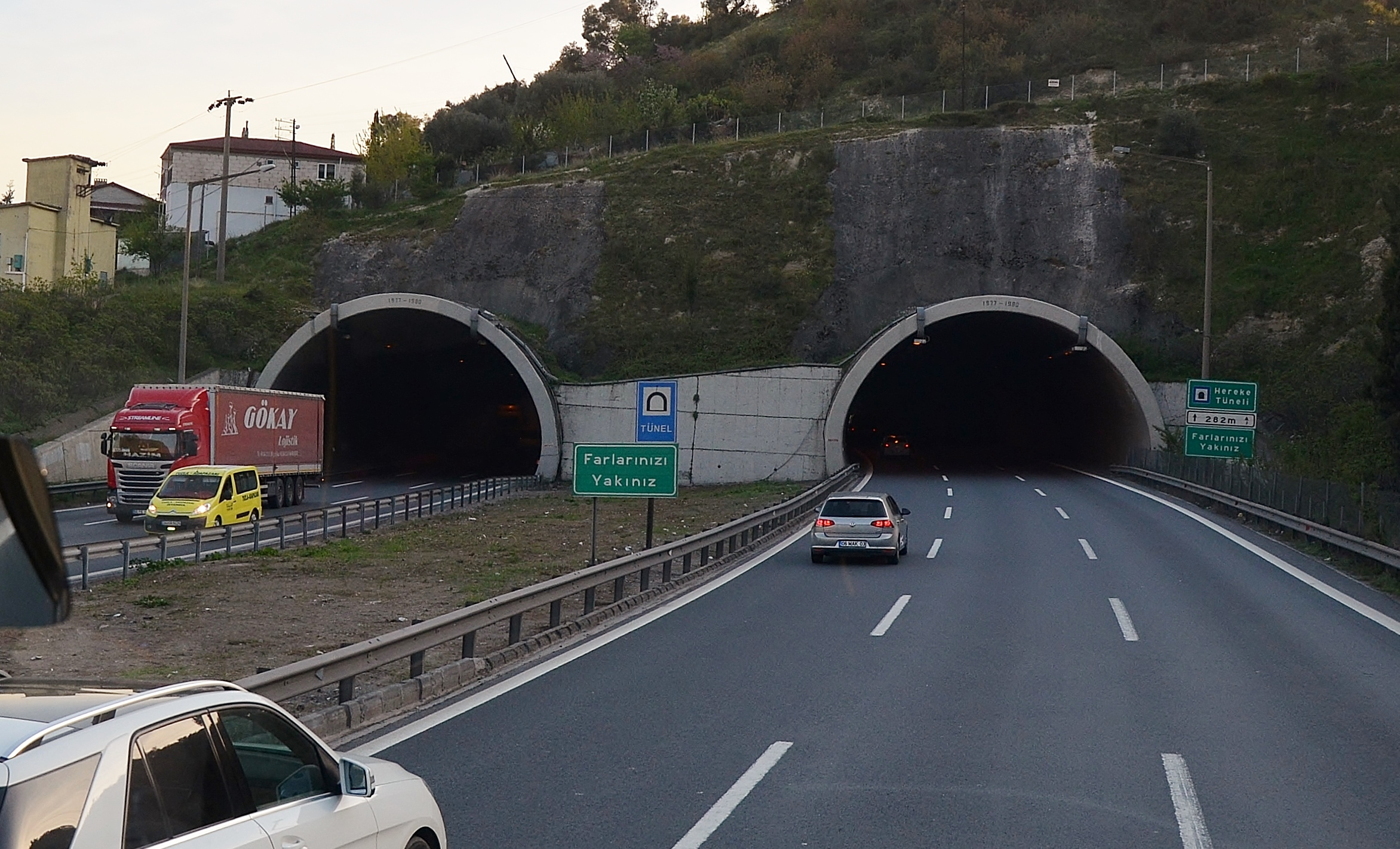
- Hereke Tunnel westbound O-4.
- Interactive map of Hereke Tunnel; Hereke Tüneli

Overview
- Location: Hereke, İzmit, Kocaeli, Turkey
- Coordinates: 40°47′06″N 29°36′33″E Location of Hereke Tunnel in Turkey
- Status: Operational
- Route: O-4 E80

Operation
- Opened: 1984; 42 years ago
- Operator: General Directorate of Highways
- Traffic: automotive
- Vehicles per day: ca. 55,000

Technical
- Length: 281–285 m (922–935 ft)
- No. of lanes: 2 x 3
- Operating speed: 80 km/h (50 mph)

The Hereke Tunnel (Turkish: Hereke Tüneli), is a motorway tunnel constructed on the Istanbul–Ankara motorway O-4 E80 in Kocaeli Province, northwestern Turkey. It was opened to traffic in 1984.

It is situated in Körfez district of Kocaeli Province. The 281–285-metre (922–935 ft) long twin-tube tunnel carries three lanes of traffic in each direction.

The tunnel was constructed in the 1980s. During the 1999 İzmit earthquake, the tunnel was light damaged. In 2012, the tunnel's both tubes were reinforced. In the time period of 2013–2014, the tunnel was modernized for traffic safety. Around 55,000 vehicles pass through the tunnel in both directions daily.

== See also ==
- List of motorway tunnels in Turkey
