= Taşoluk Tunnel =

Road tunnel in Turkey

Taşoluk Tunnel Taşoluk Tüneli
- Interactive map of Taşoluk Tunnel; Taşoluk Tüneli

Overview
- Location: Burgaçlı, Bahçe, Osmaniye, Turkey
- Coordinates: 37°10′44″N 36°27′02″E Location of Taşoluk Tunnel in Turkey
- Status: Operational
- Route: O-52 E90 AH84

Operation
- Constructed: Tekfen
- Opened: 1999; 27 years ago
- Operator: General Directorate of Highways
- Traffic: automotive

Technical
- Length: 376 and 376 m (1,234 and 1,234 ft)
- No. of lanes: 2 x 3
- Operating speed: 80 km/h (50 mph)

The Taşoluk Tunnel (Turkish: Taşoluk Tüneli), is a motorway tunnel constructed on the Adana–Şanlıurfa motorway O-52 E90 AH84 in Osmaniye Province, southern Turkey.

It is situated on the Taurus Mountains near Burgaçlı village of Bahçe, Osmaniye. The 376 and 376 m (1,234 and 1,234 ft)-long twin-tube tunnel carrying three lanes of traffic in each direction.

The tunnel was constructed by Tekfen in New Austrian Tunnelling method (NATM).

== See also ==
- List of motorway tunnels in Turkey
