= Euphrates Viaduct =

Euphrates Viaduct Fırat Viyadüğü
- Coordinates: 37.0489°N 37.9051°E
- Carries: 6 lanes of O-52 Gaziantep-Urfa Motorway
- Crosses: Euphrates
- Locale: Between Belkıs, Nizip and Birecik
- Named for: Euphrates
- Owner: General Directorate of Highways of the Ministry of Transport, Maritime and Communication
- Preceded by: Birecik Bridge

Characteristics
- Total length: 1,197 m (3,927 ft)

History
- Construction end: November 2007
- Construction cost: 70 million New Turkish lira
- Opened: Between 2009 and 2010

Location
- Interactive map of Euphrates Viaduct

The Euphrates Viaduct is a motorway bridge across the Euphrates between Belkıs, Nizip, Gaziantep Province and Birecik, Şanlıurfa Province in Turkey. Built up to 2007, it is the longest river bridge in Turkey. Buses and other cars going from the three big cities (Istanbul, Ankara and İzmir) to Diyarbakır, play an important role on this viaduct. Cars going to Diyarbakır can also use the Kömürhan Bridge which carries D.300 state roadway between Malatya and Elazığ.

== Project ==
The viaduct is a part of the O-52 Adana-Gaziantep-Urfa Motorway, which will be extended up to Habur border gate in the Iraqi border/frontier. The viaduct carries 6 lanes of motorway. 14,000 cubic-metre (m3) tonnes of iron and 94,583 cubic metres of concrete were used during the construction. It is frequently used by cars/trucks/buses in Gaziantep (from Urfa) and/or Urfa (from Gaziantep) direction. The viaduct cost 70 million new Turkish liras (2007).
