= İğdir Tunnel =

Motorway tunnel constructed in northwestern Turkey

İğdir Tunnel İğdir Tüneli
- Interactive map of İğdir Tunnel; İğdir Tüneli

Overview
- Location: Gürsu, Bursa Province, Turkey
- Coordinates: 40°15′16″N 29°12′48″E Location of İğdir Tunnel in Turkey
- Status: Operational
- Route: O-22 E90

Operation
- Constructed: Yertaş Construction Co.
- Opened: 2005; 21 years ago
- Operator: General Directorate of Highways
- Traffic: automotive

Technical
- Length: 485 and 518 m (1,591 and 1,699 ft)
- No. of lanes: 2 x 3
- Operating speed: 80 km/h (50 mph)

The İğdir Tunnel (Turkish: İğdir Tüneli), is a motorway tunnel constructed on the Bursa–Sivrihisar motorway O-22 E90 in Bursa Province, northwestern Turkey. It was opened to the traffic in 2005.

It is situated near İğdir village of Gürsu, Bursa. The 485–518-metre (1,591–1,699 ft) long twin-tube tunnel carries three lanes of traffic in each direction. The tunnel was constructed by Yertaş Construction Company.

== See also ==
- List of motorway tunnels in Turkey
