= Korutepe Tunnel =

Road tunnel in Turkey

Korutepe Tunnel Korutepe Tüneli
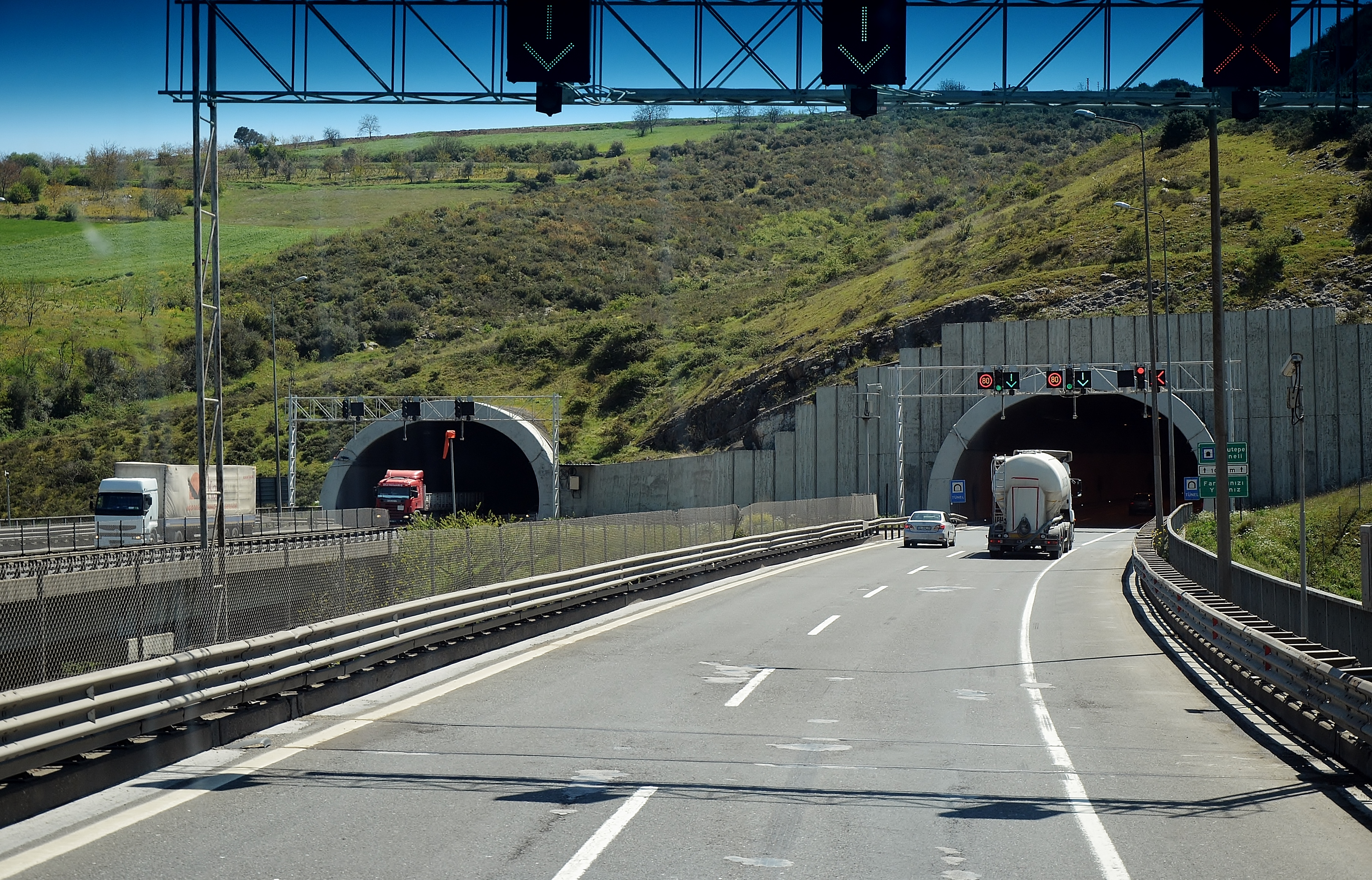
- Korutepe Tunnel eastbound O-4.
- Interactive map of Korutepe Tunnel; Korutepe Tüneli

Overview
- Location: Korutepe, İzmit, Kocaeli, Turkey
- Coordinates: 40°46′36″N 29°53′38″E Location of Korutepe Tunnel in Turkey
- Status: Operational
- Route: O-4 E80

Operation
- Opened: 1984; 42 years ago
- Operator: General Directorate of Highways
- Traffic: automotive
- Vehicles per day: ca. 55,000

Technical
- Length: 1,028–1,088 m (3,373–3,570 ft)
- No. of lanes: 2 x 2
- Operating speed: 80 km/h (50 mph)

The Korutepe Tunnel (Turkish: Korutepe Tüneli), is a motorway tunnel constructed on the Istanbul–Ankara motorway O-4 E80 in Kocaeli Province, northwestern Turkey.

It is situated on the Korutepe Hill west of İzmit. The 1,028–1,088-metre (3,373–3,570 ft) long twin-tube tunnel carries two lanes of traffic in each direction. The Gültepe Tunnel follows it in the west direction.

The tunnel was constructed in the 1980s. During the 1999 İzmit earthquake, the tunnel was light damaged. In 2012, the tunnel's both tubes were reinforced. In the time period of 2013–2014, the tunnel was modernized for traffic safety. Around 55,000 vehicles pass through the tunnel in both directions daily.

== See also ==
- List of motorway tunnels in Turkey
