= Çakıt Tunnel =

Turkish motorway tunnel

Çakıt Tunnel Çakıt Tüneli
- Interactive map of Çakıt Tunnel; Çakıt Tüneli

Overview
- Location: Pozantı, Adana, Turkey
- Coordinates: 37°29′42″N 34°49′55″E Location of Çakıt Tunnel in Turkey
- Status: Operational
- Route: O-21 E90

Operation
- Opened: March 12, 2009; 17 years ago
- Operator: General Directorate of Highways
- Traffic: automotive

Technical
- Length: 497 and 359 m (1,631 and 1,178 ft)
- No. of lanes: 2 x 3
- Operating speed: 80 km/h (50 mph)

The Çakıt Tunnel (Turkish: Çakıt Tüneli), is a motorway tunnel constructed on the Ankara–Tarsus motorway O-21 E90 in Adana Province, southern Turkey.

It is situated on the Taurus Mountains near Ömerli village of Pozantı, Adana. The 497 and 359 m (1,631 and 1,178 ft)-long twin-tube tunnel carrying three lanes of traffic in each direction is flanked by 534–526 m (1,752–1,726 ft)-long Kırkgeçit-7 Tunnel in the north and 200–200 m (660–660 ft)-long Gülek Tunnel in the south on the same motorway. Dangerous goods carriers are not permitted to use the tunnel.

== See also ==
- List of motorway tunnels in Turkey
- Kırkgeçit Tunnels
