= List of provincial roads in Istanbul Province =

Provincial roads in Istanbul Province are under the responsibility of KGM.

== Provincial road 34-02 ==
Provincial road 34-02 İl yolu 34-02
- 34-02 Hüseyinli Yolu
- Location: Çekmeköy–Şile, Istanbul
- Length: 11 km (6.8 mi)
- Existed: 2018–present

Provincial road 34-02 (turkish: İl yolu 34-02): named the "Hüseyinli" Road (turkish:Hüseyinli yolu) is a 11-kilometre-long (6.8 mi) 6 lane divided first class provincial highway.

== Provincial road 34-07 ==
Provincial road 34-07 İl yolu 34-07
- 34-07 YEŞİLVADİ yolu
- Location: Şile, Istanbul
- Length: 2 km (1.2 mi)

provincial road 34-07 (turkish: İl yolu 34-07): named the "Yesilvadi" Road (turkish:Yeşilvadi yolu) is a 2-kilometre-long (1.2 mi) two-lane fourth class provincial road connecting Yeşilvadi Village to the D.020 state highway.

== Provincial road 34-08 ==
Provincial road 34-08 İl yolu 34-08
- 34-08 ŞİLE Yolu
- Location: Şile, Istanbul
- Length: 2 km (1.2 mi)

provincial road 34-08 (turkish: İl yolu 34-08): named the "Sile" Road (turkish:Şile yolu) is a 2-kilometre-long (1.2 mi) two-lane third class provincial road connecting the central district of Sile to the D.020 state highway.

== Provincial road 34-11 ==
Provincial road 34-11 İl yolu 34-11
- O1—1.çevre yolu
- Location: Üsküdar, Kadıköy Istanbul
- Length: 5 km (3.1 mi)
- Existed: 1973–present

Provincial road 34-11 (Turkish: İl yolu 34-11): named the O1—1st Beltway (Turkish: O1—1.Çevre yolu) is a 5-kilometre-long (3.1 mi) first class divided provincial highway in Istanbul, Turkey.

== Provincial road 34-12 ==
Provincial road 34-12 İl yolu 34-12
- O1-O2 bağlantısı
- Location: Üsküdar–Ataşehir, Istanbul
- Length: 4 km (2.5 mi)
- Existed: 1991–present

Provincial road 34-12(Turkish: İl yolu 34-12): named the O1-O2 connector (Turkish: O1-O2 bağlantısı) is a 4-kilometre-long (2.5 mi) first class divided provincial highway in Istanbul, Turkey.

== Provincial road 34-13 ==
Provincial road 34-13 İl yolu 34-13
- Kozyatağı_O2 bağlantısı 2.Çevre Yolu
- Location: Kadıköy-Ataşehir, Istanbul
- Length: 3 km (1.9 mi)
- Existed: 1991–present

Provincial road 34-13 (Turkish: İl yolu 34-13): named the O2—Kozyatağı connection (Turkish: O2—Kozyatağı bağlantısı) is a 3-kilometre-long (1.9 mi) 6 lane divided first class provincial highway that connects the O-2 (Anadolu otoyolu Junction) to the state highway (Kozyatağı junction)D.100 in Istanbul

== Provincial road 34-25 ==
Provincial road 34-25 İl yolu 34-25
- 34-25 Eski Ankara asfaltı
- Location: Tuzla, Istanbul-Gebze
- Length: 8 km (5.0 mi)

== Provincial road 34-27 ==
Provincial road 34-27 İl yolu 34-27
- Samandıra-Kartal bağlantısı
- Location: Sancaktepe–Kartal, Istanbul
- Length: 9.9 km (6.2 mi)
- Existed: 1991–present

Provincial road 34-27 (Turkish: İl yolu 34-27), named the Samadıra–Kartal connector (Turkish: Samandıra-Kartal bağlantısı), is a 9.9-kilometre-long (6.2 mi) highway that connects the motorway O-4 to the state highway D.100 in Istanbul, Turkey. A provincial road is governed under the responsibility of the respective Turkish provincial government, and bears the license plate number of that province in the road identification number's first half. It is one of the three connectors between the two roads in the Istanbul metropolitan area. The route begins at exit K2 on the O-4 and heads south through two large parks, the Kayışdağı and Aydos forests, until reaching Kartal and connecting to the D.100. After the interchange, the connector becomes Sanayi Cad. ("Industry Avenue") and continues as a surface street. The connector was built in 1991.

== Provincial road 34-28 ==
Provincial road 34-28 İl yolu 34-28
- Hava alanı-pendik yolu
- Location: Pendik, Istanbul
- Length: 11 km (6.8 mi)
- Existed: 1991–present

Provincial road 34-28 (Turkish: İl yolu 34-28), named the Hava alanı–Pendik connector (Turkish: Hava alanı-Pendik bağlantısı), is 11-kilometre-long (6.2 mi) highway that connects the motorway O-4 to the state highway D.100 in Istanbul, Turkey.

== Provincial road 34-84 ==
Provincial road 34-84 İl yolu 34-84
- 34-84 Hadımköy yolu
- Location: Arnavutköy (district)–Büyükçekmece, Istanbul
- Length: 9 km (5.6 mi)

== Provincial road 34-89 ==
Provincial road 34-89 İl yolu 34-89
- 34-89 Kasımpaşa yolu
- Location: Beyoğlu, Istanbul
- Length: 3 km (1.9 mi)

== Provincial road 34-90 ==
Provincial road 34-90 İl yolu 34-90
- 34-90 Silivri-Çatalca yolu
- Location: Silivri-Çatalca, Istanbul
- Length: 27 km (17 mi)

== Provincial road 34-91 ==
Provincial road 34-91 İl yolu 34-91
- 34-91 Muratbey Gümrük yolu
- Location: Çatalca, Istanbul
- Length: 3 km (1.9 mi)

== Provincial road 34-92 ==
Provincial road 34-92 İl yolu 34-92
- 34-92 Şehir hastahanesi yolu
- Location: Başakşehir, Istanbul
- Length: 5 km (3.1 mi)
