= Provincial road 34-27 (Turkey) =

Road in Istanbul, Turkey

Provincial road 34-27 İl yolu 34-27
- Samandıra-Kartal bağlantısı

Route information
- Length: 9.9 km (6.2 mi)
- Existed: 1991–present

Major junctions
- From: O-4 in Sancaktepe, Istanbul

- To: D.100 in Kartal, Istanbul

Location
- Country: Turkey
- Regions: Marmara
- Provinces: Istanbul
- Major cities: Sancaktepe, Kartal

Highway system
- Highways in Turkey; Motorways; List; State Highways; List

Provincial road 34-27 (Turkish: İl yolu 34-27), named the Samadıra–Kartal connector (Turkish: Samandıra-Kartal bağlantısı), is a 9.9-kilometre-long (6.2 mi) highway that connects the otoyol O-4 to the state highway D.100 in Istanbul, Turkey. A provincial road is governed under the responsibility of the respective Turkish provincial government, and bears the license plate number of that province in the road identification number's first half. It is one of the three connectors between the two roads in the Istanbul metropolitan area. The route begins at exit K2 on the O-4 and heads south through two large parks, the Kayışdağı and Aydos forests, until reaching Kartal and connecting to the D.100. After the interchange, the connector becomes Sanayi Cad. ("Industry Avenue") and continues as a surface street. The connector was built in 1991.

== Exit list ==
The entire route is in Istanbul Province.

District	km	mi	Destinations	Notes
Sancaktepe	0.0	0.0	O-4 – Istanbul, Ankara	Exit K2 on the O-4
Sancaktepe	1.4	0.87	Samandıra Toll Plaza	
Sancaktepe	2.0	1.2	Yakacık Avenue	
Kartal	4.7	2.9	Samandıra–Yakacık Road	
Kartal	7.5	4.7	Balıkesir Avenue	
Kartal	8.9	5.5	Yalnız Selvi Avenue	Southbound entrance and exit
Kartal	9.1	5.7	Kartal Avenue	Northbound entrance and exit
Kartal	9.6	6.0	D.100 – Harem, Tuzla	
Kartal	9.9	6.2	Sanayi Avenue	Roadway continues as Sanayi Avenue
1.000 mi = 1.609 km; 1.000 km = 0.621 mi: Incomplete access; Tolled
