= Gültepe Tunnel =

Road tunnel in Turkey

Gültepe Tunnel Gültepe Tüneli
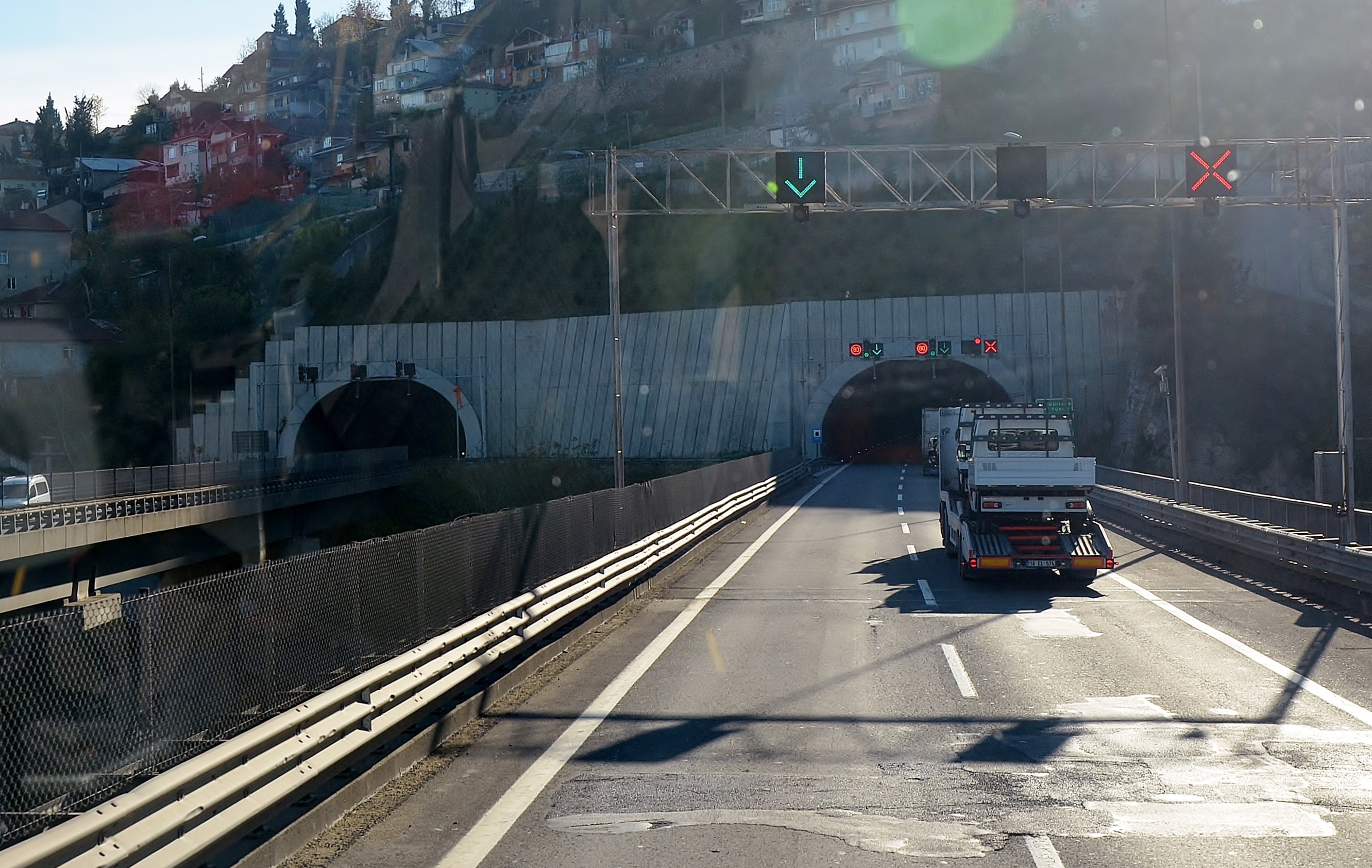
- Gültepe Tunnel westbound O-4.
- Interactive map of Gültepe Tunnel; Gültepe Tüneli

Overview
- Location: Gültepe, İzmit, Kocaeli, Turkey
- Coordinates: 40°46′32″N 29°54′30″E Location of Gültepe Tunnel in Turkey
- Status: Operational
- Route: O-4 E80

Operation
- Opened: 1984; 42 years ago
- Operator: General Directorate of Highways
- Traffic: automotive
- Vehicles per day: ca. 55,000

Technical
- Length: 639–584 m (2,096–1,916 ft)
- No. of lanes: 2 x 2
- Operating speed: 80 km/h (50 mph)

The Gültepe Tunnel (Turkish: Gültepe Tüneli), is a motorway tunnel constructed on the Istanbul–Ankara motorway O-4 E80 in Kocaeli Province, northwestern Turkey. It was opened to traffic in 1984.

It is situated on the Gültepe Hill west of İzmit. The 639–584-metre (2,096–1,916 ft) long twin-tube tunnel carries two lanes of traffic in each direction.

The tunnel was constructed in the 1980s. During the 1999 İzmit earthquake, the tunnel was light damaged. In 2012, the tunnel's both tubes were reinforced. In the time period of 2013–2014, the tunnel was modernized for traffic safety. Around 55,000 vehicles pass through the tunnel in both directions daily.

== See also ==
- List of motorway tunnels in Turkey
