= Kırkgeçit Tunnels =

Road tunnels in Turkey

Kırkgeçit Tunnels Kırkgeçit Tünelleri
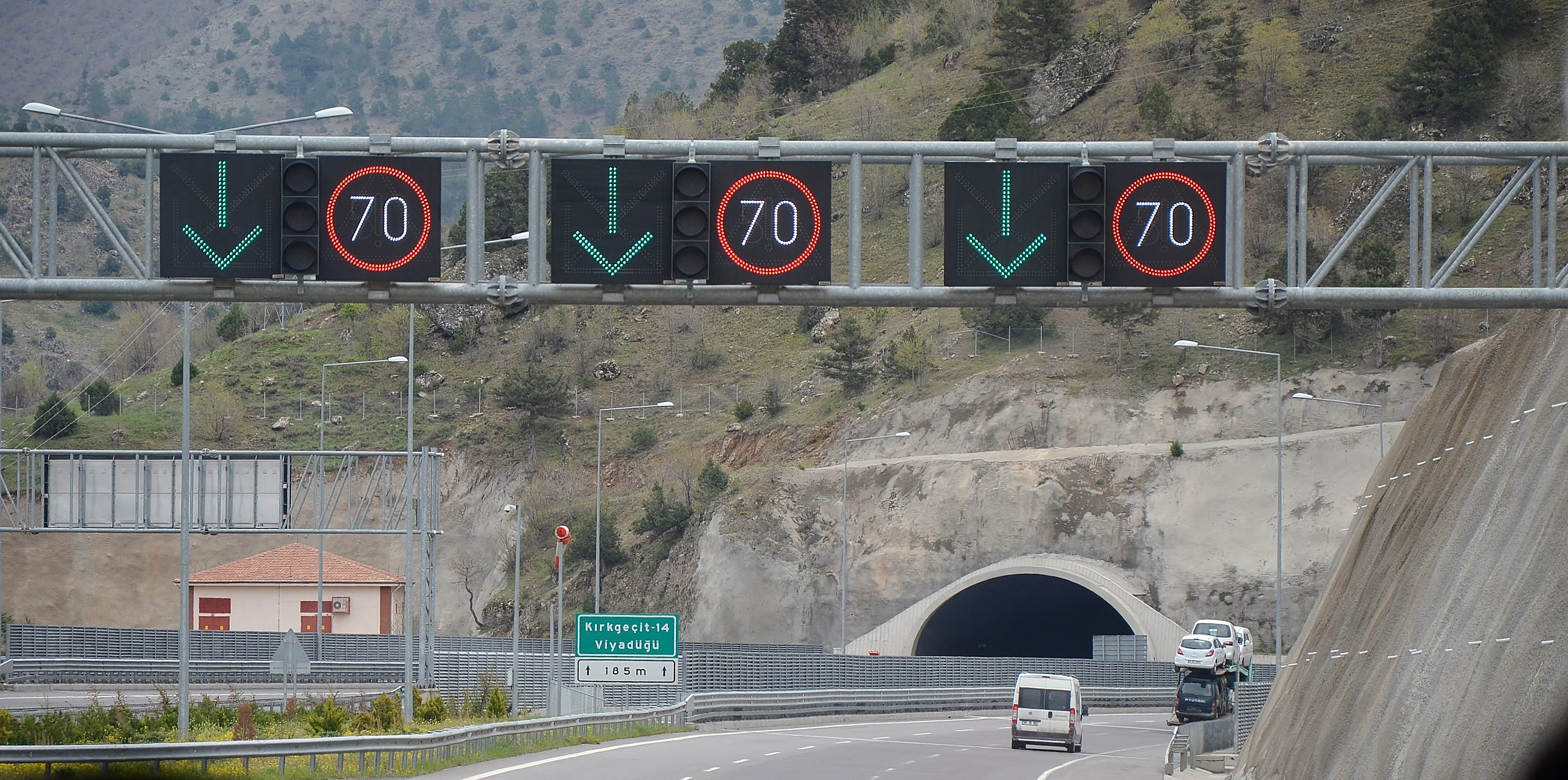
- Kırkgeçit-6 Tunnel in on the Motorway O-21.
- Interactive map of Kırkgeçit Tunnels; Kırkgeçit Tünelleri

Overview
- Location: Kemerhisar, Niğde-Pozantı, Adana
- Coordinates: 37°34′58″N 34°45′00″E Location of Kırkgeçit Tunnels in Turkey.

- Route: O-21 E90

Operation
- Opened: 12 March 2009; 17 years ago
- Operator: General Directorate of Highways
- Traffic: automotive

Technical
- No. of lanes: 2 x 3
- Operating speed: 80 km/h (50 mph)

Kırkgeçit Tunnels (Turkish: Kırkgeçit Tünelleri, literally "Forty-Passes tunnels") are a series of seven motorway tunnels crossing the Taurus Mountains on the province border of Niğde and Adana, Turkey.

The tunnels are located on the Ankara-Tarsus motorway O-21 E90 between Kemerhisar and Pozantı connecting the Central Anatolia Region with the Mediterranean Region. Five of the tunnels in the north are in Niğde Province while the remaining two are situated in Adana Province. All the seven tunnels are twin bores and carry three lanes of traffic in each direction. 16 viaducts named Kırkgeçit Viaducts connect the tunnels in series. Dangerous goods carriers are not permitted to use the tunnels. The Çakıt Tunnel follows the Kırkgeçit-7 Tunnel in direction Pozantı.

The tunnels were constructed as part of the motorway O-21 and were opened to traffic on 12 March 2009. The tunnels allow the travel time of the passage through the mountainous terrain drop from one-and-half hours before to 20 minutes. A saving of ₺110 million annually is calculated for the national economy. The tunnels enable a through-traffic on motorways from the Bulgarian border Kapıkule to the border crossings to Syria and Iraq.

Tunnel	Motorway	Length (bore #1-bore #2)	Province
Kırkgeçit-1	O-21 E90	941–958 m (3,087–3,143 ft)	Niğde
Kırkgeçit-2	O-21 E90	584–548 m (1,916–1,798 ft)	Niğde
Kırkgeçit-3	O-21 E90	255–286 m (837–938 ft)	Niğde
Kırkgeçit-4	O-21 E90	630–439 m (2,067–1,440 ft)	Niğde
Kırkgeçit-5	O-21 E90	651–652 m (2,136–2,139 ft)	Niğde
Kırkgeçit-6	O-21 E90	855–816 m (2,805–2,677 ft)	Adana
Kırkgeçit-7	O-21 E90	534–526 m (1,752–1,726 ft)	Adana

== See also ==
- List of motorway tunnels in Turkey
- Çakıt Tunnel
