= Provincial road 34-28 (Turkey) =

Road in Istanbul, Turkey

Provincial road 34-28 İl yolu 34-28
- Hava alanı-Pendik bağlantısı
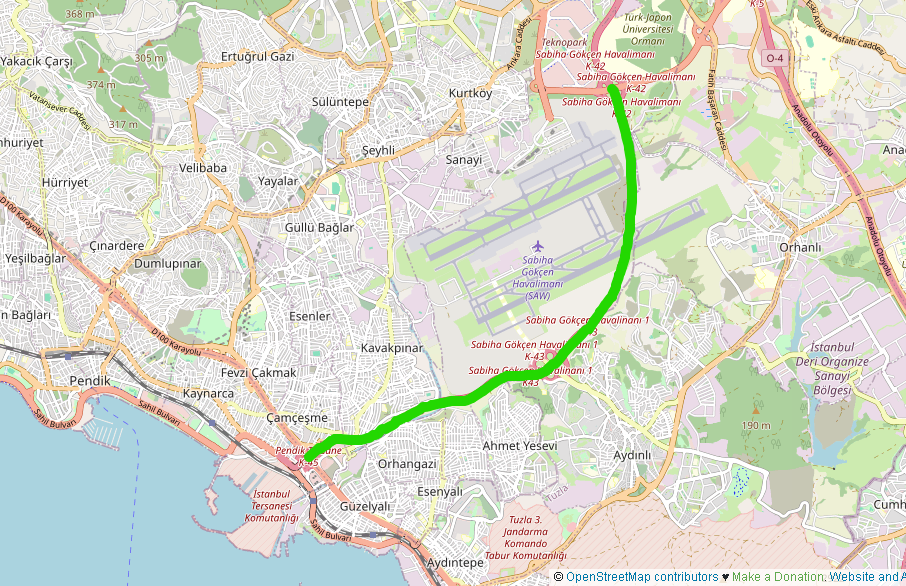

Route information
- Length: 11 km (6.8 mi)
- Existed: 2001–present

Major junctions
- From: O-4 "S.Gökçen Havaalanı K42" Junction in Pendik, Istanbul

- To: D.100 "Pendik Tersane1 K45" junction in Pendik, Istanbul

Location
- Country: Turkey
- Regions: Marmara
- Provinces: Istanbul
- Major cities: Pendik

Highway system
- Highways in Turkey; Motorways; List; State Highways; List

Provincial road 34-28 (Turkish: İl yolu 34-28), named the Hava alanı–Pendik connector It is a first class divided provincial road numbered 34-28, under the responsibility of KGM (General Directorate of Highways), 11 km long, starting at O-4 S. Gökçen Airport K42 Junction and ending at D-100 Pendik Tersane1 K45 Junction.

== Exit list ==
The entire route is in Pendik, Istanbul Province.

km	mi	Exit	Destinations	Notes
0.7	0.43	K41	O-4 Kurtköy junction	O-4—Sabiha Gökçen Airport connection
2.5	1.6	K42	"S.Gökçen Havaalanı" junction	
3.8	2.4		"Sabiha Gökçen Tüneli" Tunnel	1.5km long tunnel
6.9	4.3	K43	"S.Gökçen Havaalanı 1" junction	
10.2	6.3	K44	"Kavakpınar" junction	
10.9	6.8	K45	"Pendik Tersane 1" junction	D.100
1.000 mi = 1.609 km; 1.000 km = 0.621 mi: Tolled
