= Revaluation of the Turkish lira =

Overview of the revaluation of the Turkish lira

New Turkish lira
Yeni Türk Lirası (Turkish)
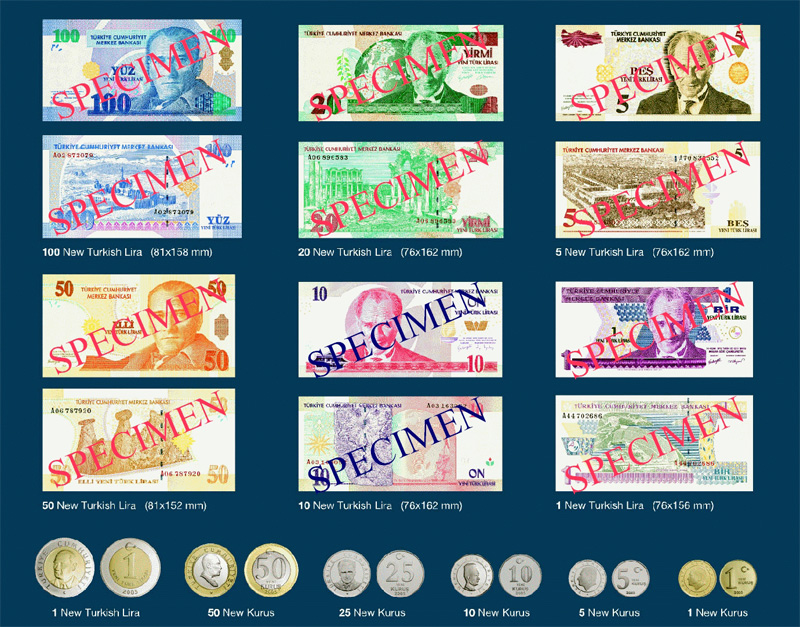
- New lira banknotes and coins

ISO 4217
- Code: TRY

Unit
- Symbol: YTL

Denominations
- Subunit
- 1/100: new kuruş
- Banknotes: 1, 5, 10, 20, 50, 100 new lira
- Coins: 1, 5, 10, 25, 50 new kuruş, 1 new lira

Demographics
- User(s): Turkey (to 31 December 2008); Northern Cyprus (to 31 December 2008)

Issuance
- Central bank: Central Bank of the Republic of Turkey
- Website: www.tcmb.gov.tr

Valuation
- Inflation: 10.61% (Turkey, June 2008)
- Source: Central Bank of the Republic of Turkey, Inflation report 2008-III
- This infobox shows the latest status before this currency was rendered obsolete.

The new Turkish lira (Turkish: Yeni Türk Lirası) was the currency of Turkey and the de facto independent state of the Turkish Republic of Northern Cyprus between 1 January 2005 and 31 December 2008 which was a transition period for the removal of six zeroes from the currency. The new lira was subdivided into 100 new kuruş (yeni kuruş). The symbol was YTL and the ISO 4217 code was TRY.

== History ==
Because of the chronic inflation experienced in Turkey from the 1970s through to the 1990s, the old lira experienced severe depreciation. Turkey has consistently had high inflation rates compared to developed countries: from an average of 9 lira per U.S. dollar in the late 1960s, the currency came to trade at approximately 1,650,000 lira per U.S. dollar in late 2001. This represented an average inflation of about 38% per year. Prime Minister Recep Tayyip Erdoğan had called this problem a "national shame". With the revaluation of the Turkish old lira, the Romanian leu (also revalued in July 2005) briefly became the world's least valued currency unit.

In late December 2003, the Grand National Assembly of Turkey passed a law that allowed for the removal of six zeroes from the currency, and the creation of the new lira. It was introduced on 1 January 2005, replacing the previous lira (which remained valid in circulation until the end of 2005) at a rate of 1 new lira = 1,000,000 old lira.

Following its introduction, the official name of the currency was the "New Turkish Lira", but according to the Central Bank, the word "new" (yeni) was only a "temporary" measure. A news agency reported that "new" would be removed on January 1, 2009. The same source also indicated that the banknotes would have "different shapes and sizes to prevent forgery". The issuance of a new highest denomination, 200 lira, was contemplated at the same time.

== Coins ==
Coins were introduced in 2005 in denominations of 1, 5, 10, 25 and 50 new (Yeni) kuruş and 1 new (Yeni) lira. The 1 new (Yeni) kuruş was minted in brass and the 5, 10 and 25 new kuruş in cupro-nickel, whilst the 50 new kuruş and 1 new lira are bimetallic. All coins show portraits of Mustafa Kemal Atatürk.

To the dismay of the European Central Bank, the sizes and compositions of the 50 new kuruş and 1 new lira coins clearly resemble those of the €1 and €2 coins respectively. (See comparison photo in of YTL 1 coin and €2 coin.) This could cause confusion in the eurozone. It also caused trouble to businesses using vending machines (particularly at airports) in the eurozone since a number of vending machines at the time accepted the 1 new lira coin as a €2 coin. Since €2 is worth roughly four times more, vending machines affected had to be upgraded at the expense of their owners.

== Banknotes ==
Banknotes, referred to by the Central Bank as the "E-8 Emission Group", were introduced in 2005 in denominations of 1, 5, 10, 20, 50, and 100 new lira. Whilst the lower four denominations replaced older notes and used very similar designs, the 50 and 100 new lira notes did not have equivalents in the old currency. All notes show portraits of Mustafa Kemal Atatürk from different points of his life and images of various historical and otherwise important buildings and places in Turkey. A new series of banknotes, the "E-9 Emission Group", entered circulation on 1 January 2009, with the E-8 group ceasing to be valid after 31 December 2009 (although still redeemable at branches of the Central Bank until 31 December 2019). The E-9 banknotes refer to the currency as "lira" rather than "new lira", and include a 200 lira denomination.

Banknotes of Emission 8
Image		Value	Dimensions	Main colour	Description	
Obverse	Reverse	Value	Dimensions	Main colour	Obverse	Reverse
		1 lira	160 × 76 mm	Claret red, blue	Kemal Atatürk	Atatürk Dam (as a part of Southeastern Anatolia Project)
		5 lira	162 × 76 mm	Pastel yellow and greenish brown	Kemal Atatürk	Anıtkabir, Ankara
		10 lira	162 × 76 mm	Red	Kemal Atatürk with Flag of Turkey silhouette	Piri Reis Map
		20 lira	162 × 76 mm	Green	Kemal Atatürk	Ruins of Ephesus
		50 lira	152 × 81 mm	Orange	Kemal Atatürk	Cappadocia
		100 lira	158 × 81 mm	Blue	Kemal Atatürk	Ishak Pasha Palace
These images are to scale at 0.7 pixel per millimetre (18 pixel per inch). For table standards, see the banknote specification table.

Current TRY exchange rates
From Google Finance:	AUD CAD CHF CNY EUR GBP HKD JPY USD INR
From Yahoo! Finance:	AUD CAD CHF CNY EUR GBP HKD JPY USD INR
From XE.com:	AUD CAD CHF CNY EUR GBP HKD JPY USD INR
From OANDA:	AUD CAD CHF CNY EUR GBP HKD JPY USD INR

== See also ==
- Economy of Northern Cyprus
- Economy of Turkey

Preceded by: First Turkish lira Reason: inflation Ratio: 1 new lira= 1,000,000 lira	Currency of Turkey; January 1, 2005 – December 31, 2008	Succeeded by: Second Turkish lira Reason: renaming Ratio: at par
