= Otoyol 53 =

Highway in Turkey

Coordinates: 36°56′54″N 36°10′17″E

O-53
- Toprakkale-İskenderun Motorway; Toprakkale-İskenderun Otoyolu

Route information
- Part of E91 / AH84
- Length: 150 km (93 mi)

Major junctions
- From: O-52
- To: İskenderun South

Location
- Country: Turkey
- Regions: Mediterranean
- Provinces: Adana, Hatay
- Major cities: İskenderun

Highway system
- Highways in Turkey; Motorways; List; State Highways; List
← O-52	→ O-54

Otoyol 53 (English: Motorway 53), abbreviated as O-53, also known as Ceyhan-İskenderun Otoyolu (English: Ceyhan-İskenderun Motorway), is a toll motorway in Mediterranean Region, Turkey, connecting the Adana-Şanlıurfa Motorway O-52 with İskenderun. The motorway is part of international routes as European route E91 and Asian Highway 84.

The O-53 starts from Ceyhan in Adana Province at the junction of O-52, runs southward to İskenderun South bypassing the city in the east.

== See also ==
- List of highways in Turkey
