= European route E89 =

Road in trans-European E-road network

E89

Route information
- Length: 130 km (81 mi)

Major junctions
- North end: Gerede
- South end: Ankara

Location
- Countries: Turkey

Highway system
- International E-road network; A Class; B Class

The European route E89 is a road part of the International E-road network, running from Gerede in Turkey to Ankara in Turkey.

It is a Class A North-South connection road connecting Gerede - Kizilcahamam - Ankara (according to the UNECE).

== Route ==
Turkey

- O-4: Gerede ( E80) - Ankara
- O-20: Ankara ( E90 E88)
