= European route E88 =

Road in trans-European E-road network

E88

Major junctions
- West end: Ankara
- East end: Refahiye

Location
- Countries: Turkey

Highway system
- International E-road network; A Class; B Class

European route E 88 is part of the international E-road network.

== Route ==
Turkey

- O-20: Ankara ( E89 E90)
- D.200: Ankara — Sivas — Refahiye ( E80)
