= Otoyol 21 =

O-21
- Ankara-Tarsus Motorway; Ankara-Tarsus Otoyolu

Route information
- Part of E90
- Length: 432 km (268 mi)

Major junctions
- From: Gölbaşı, Ankara
- To: Tarsus, Mersin

Location
- Country: Turkey
- Regions: Central Anatolia, Mediterranean
- Provinces: Ankara, Konya, Aksaray, Nevşehir, Niğde, Adana, Mersin
- Major cities: Niğde, Tarsus

Highway system
- Highways in Turkey; Motorways; List; State Highways; List
← O-20	→ O-21A

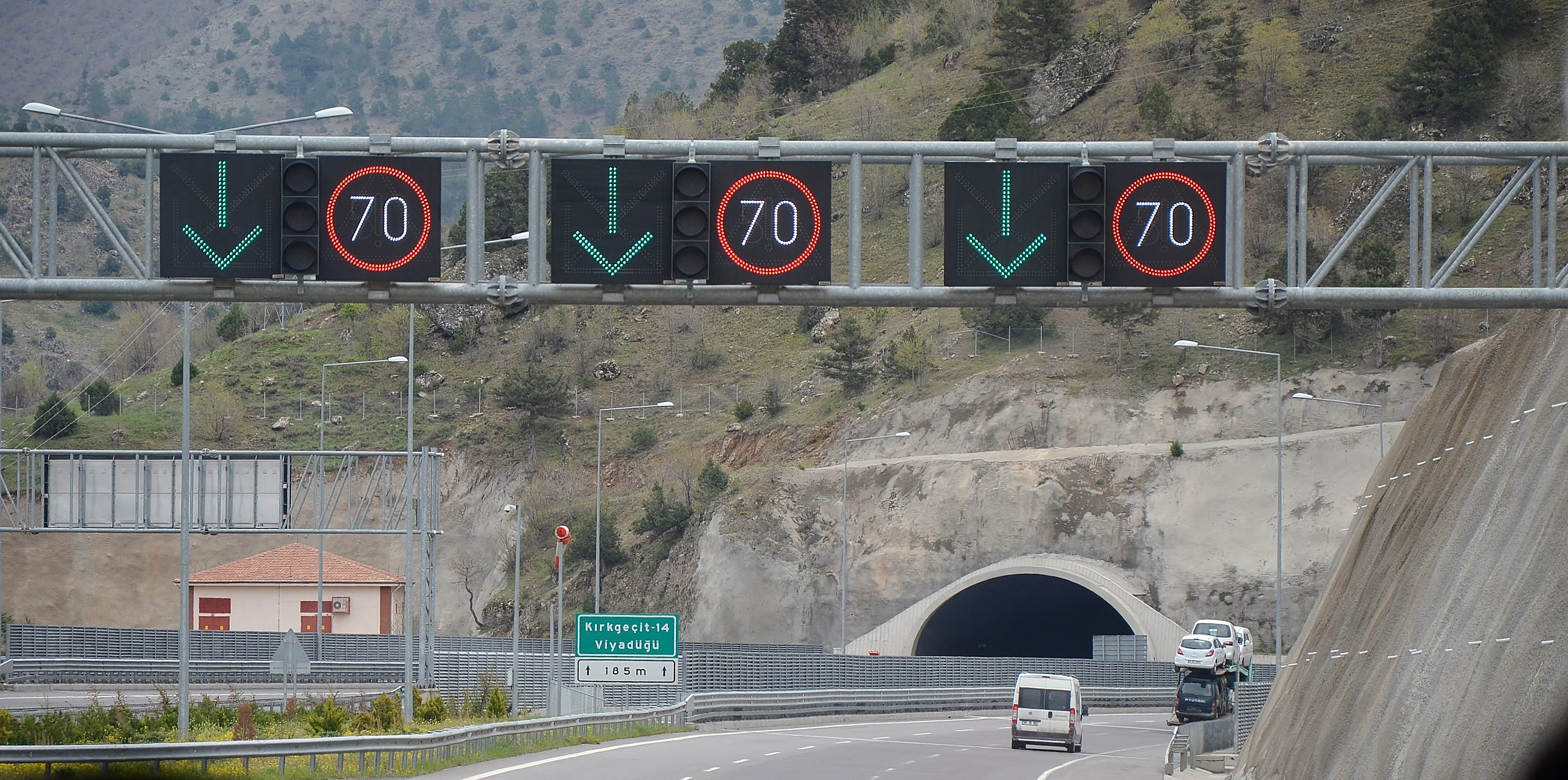
Kırkgeçit Tunnels

Otoyol 21 (English: Motorway 21), abbreviated as O-21, a.k.a. Ankara-Tarsus Otoyolu (English: Ankara-Tarsus Motorway), is a completed toll motorway in the Central Anatolia and Mediterranean regions in Turkey. Currently, it connects Otoyol 20 from Gölbaşı, Ankara with the Adana-Mersin Motorway O-51 at Tarsus in Mersin Province. On its full length, it is part of the European E90. The last part of the highway opened on 16 December 2020. With a length of 432 kilometres, the O-21 is the longest motorway in Turkey.

== Exit list ==
Province	District	km	mi	Exit	Destinations	Notes
Ankara	Gölbaşı	0.0	0.0	K8	O-20 (Ankara beltway) — Ankara	
Ankara	Gölbaşı	14.4	8.9	K1	D.260 — Haymana, Ankara	
Ankara	Gölbaşı	16.9	10.5	Gölbaşı Toll Plaza		
Ankara	Gölbaşı	29.5	18.3	K2	D.750 — Ahıboz	
Ankara	Gölbaşı	76.1	47.3	K3	D.753 — Kulu	
Ankara	Şereflikoçhisar	101.5	63.1	K4	D.757 — Acıkuyu	
Aksaray	Sarıyahşi	139.5	86.7	K5	P.68-83 — Sarıyahşi	
Aksaray	Ağaçören	157.5	97.9	K6	Kırşehir connector — Kırşehir	
Aksaray	Ortaköy	178.3	110.8	K7	D.757 — Kırşehir, Ortaköy	
Aksaray	Aksaray	213.6	132.7	K8	D.300 — Aksaray, Nevşehir	
Nevşehir	Derinkuyu	241.6	150.1	K9	P.68-83 — Sarıyahşi	
Niğde	Niğde	275	171	K10	P.51-78 — Gölcük	
Niğde	Niğde			K11	D.765 — Nevşehir	
Niğde	Niğde			K11	D.805 — Kayseri	
Niğde	Niğde			K12	D.805 — Niğde / Aydın Ave.	
Niğde	Bor			K13	P.51-51 — Kemerhisar	
Niğde	Ulukışla			K14	O-21A — Konya	
Niğde	Ulukışla			Kırkgeçit Tunnels		
Niğde	Ulukışla			Çakıt Tunnel		
Adana	Pozantı			K15	D.750 — Pozantı	Pozantı north
Adana	Pozantı			K16	D.750 — Pozantı	Northbound exit, southbound entrance only.
Adana	Pozantı			K17	D.750 — Akçatekir	
Mersin	Tarsus			K18	D.750 — Çamalan	
Mersin	Tarsus			K19	O-51 — Mersin, Adana	
Mersin	Tarsus			Tarsus Toll Plaza		
Mersin	Tarsus			K20	D.400 — Mersin, Adana	
1.000 mi = 1.609 km; 1.000 km = 0.621 mi: Incomplete access; Tolled; Unopened

== See also ==
- List of highways in Turkey
