= Otoyol 51 =

O-51
- Adana-Kızkalesi Motorway; Adana-Kızkalesi Otoyolu

Route information
- Part of E90 / E982 / AH84
- Length: 141 km (88 mi)
- Existed: 1992–present

Major junctions
- From: O-52 in Seyhan, Adana: O-21 in Tarsus, Mersin; D.750 in Tarsus, Mersin

- O-21 in Tarsus, Mersin; D.750 in Tarsus, Mersin

- To: D.400 in Kızkalesi, Mersin

Location
- Country: Turkey
- Regions: Mediterranean
- Provinces: Adana, Mersin
- Major cities: Adana, Tarsus, Mersin

Highway system
- Highways in Turkey; Motorways; List; State Highways; List
← O-33	→ O-52

Otoyol 51 (English: Motorway 51), abbreviated as O-51, a.k.a. Adana-Kızkalesi Otoyolu (English: Adana-Kızkalesi Motorway), is a toll motorway in the Mediterranean Region of Turkey, connecting the cities Adana and Mersin. The motorway is on its full length of 141 km (88 mi) part of international routes as of European routes E90 and E982 and Asian Highway 84.

The motorway starts from the western terminus of O-52 in Central Adana, runs westward reaching the south terminus of Pozantı-Adana Motorway O-21 northeast of Tarsus, continues southwest to Mersin bypassing it at north, passing Erdemli and eventually terminates in Kızkalesi, a popular tourist city known for its namesake castle.

There are plans to extend the motorway to Taşucu.

== Exit list ==
Province	District	km	mi	Exit	Destination	Notes
Adana	Yüreğir	0.0	0.0	K1	Dr. Mithat Özsan Blv.	Continues as O-52 to Şanlıurfa
Adana	Seyhan River	0.0	0.0	Seyhan Viaduct		
Adana	Seyhan/Çukurova			K2	Özdemir Sabancı Blvd. — Beyazevler	
Adana	Seyhan/Çukurova			K3	Mavi Blv.	Eastbound entrance and exit
Adana	Seyhan/Çukurova			K3	Kasım Yener Blvd.	Westbound entrance and exit
Adana	Seyhan/Çukurova			-	Dr. Ahmet Sadık Blvd.	Westbound exit
Adana	Seyhan/Çukurova			K4	Öğretmenler Blvd.	
Adana	Seyhan/Çukurova			K5	P.01-75 — Karaisali	
Mersin	Tarsus			Adana West Toll Plaza		
Mersin	Tarsus			K19	O-21 — Ulukışla, Niğde	
Mersin	Tarsus			K6	D.750 — Aksaray, Ankara	
Mersin	Tarsus			Berdan Viaduct		
Mersin	Tarsus			K7	Tarsus connector — Tarsus	Connector to D.400
Mersin	Akdeniz			Mersin Toll Plaza		
Mersin	Akdeniz			K8	151st St. — Mersin	Connector to D.400
Mersin	Toroslar			K9	P.33-75 — Mersin, Gözne	
Mersin	Yenişehir			K10	Pamuklu Ave. — Mersin Arena	
Mersin	Mezitli			K11	Vatan Ave. — Kuyuluk	
Mersin	Erdemli			K12	D.400 — Anamur, Antalya	

Light blue indicates toll section of motorway.

== See also ==
- List of highways in Turkey
