= Otoyol 4 =

Highway in Turkey

O-4
- Anadolu Otoyolu

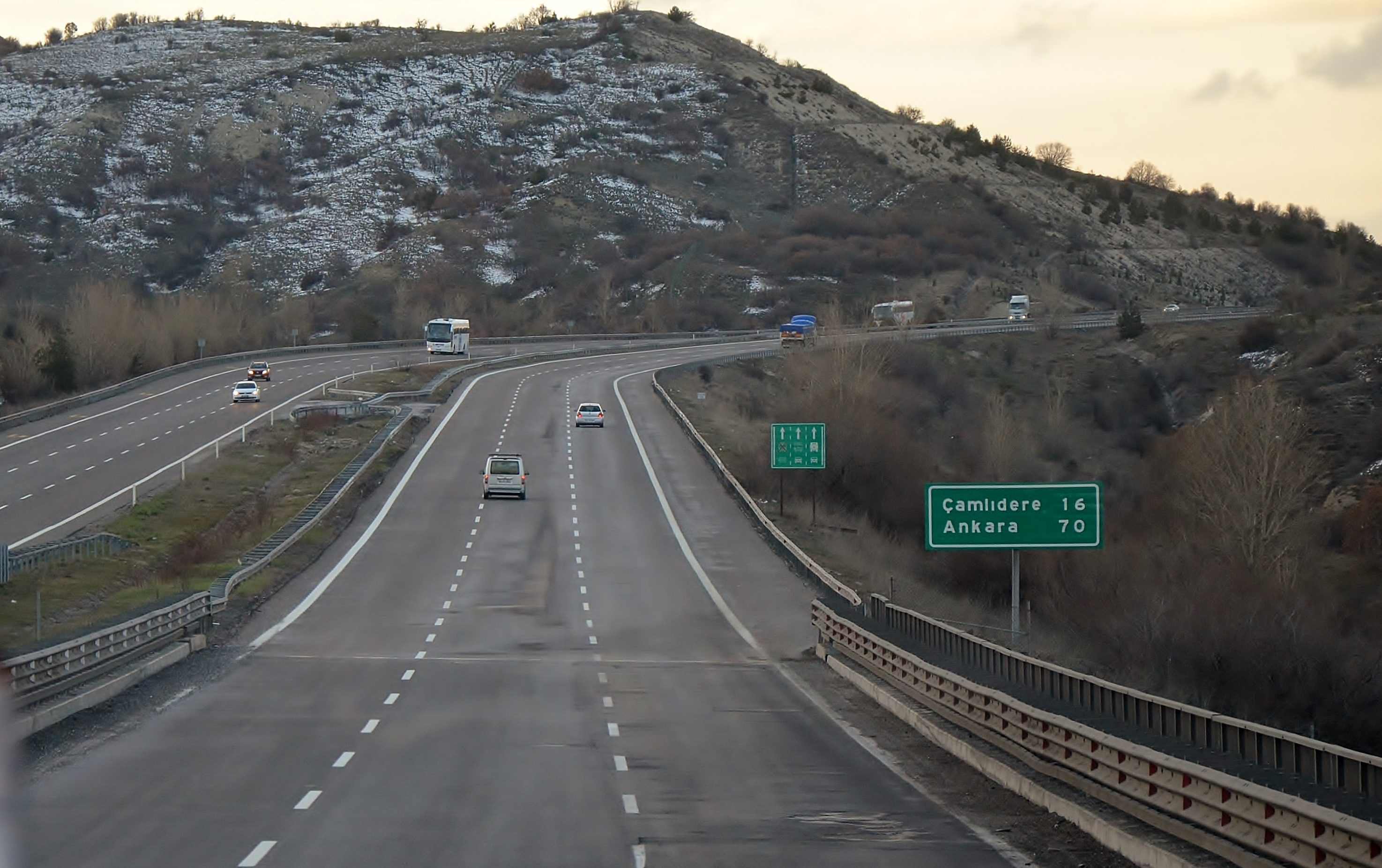

Route information
- Part of E80 E89
- Part of AH1
- Length: 372 km (231 mi)
- Existed: 1984–present

Major junctions
- West end: O-1, in Istanbul

- O-2 in Ataşehir; O-7 in Sultanbeyli; D.100 in Gebze; O-5 in Gebze; D.605 in Izmit; D.650 in Arifiye

- East end: O-20 in Ankara

Location
- Country: Turkey
- Regions: Marmara, Black Sea, Central Anatolia
- Provinces: Istanbul, Kocaeli, Sakarya, Düzce, Bolu, Ankara
- Major cities: Istanbul, Izmit, Bolu, Ankara

Highway system
- Highways in Turkey; Motorways; List; State Highways; List
← O-3	→ O-5

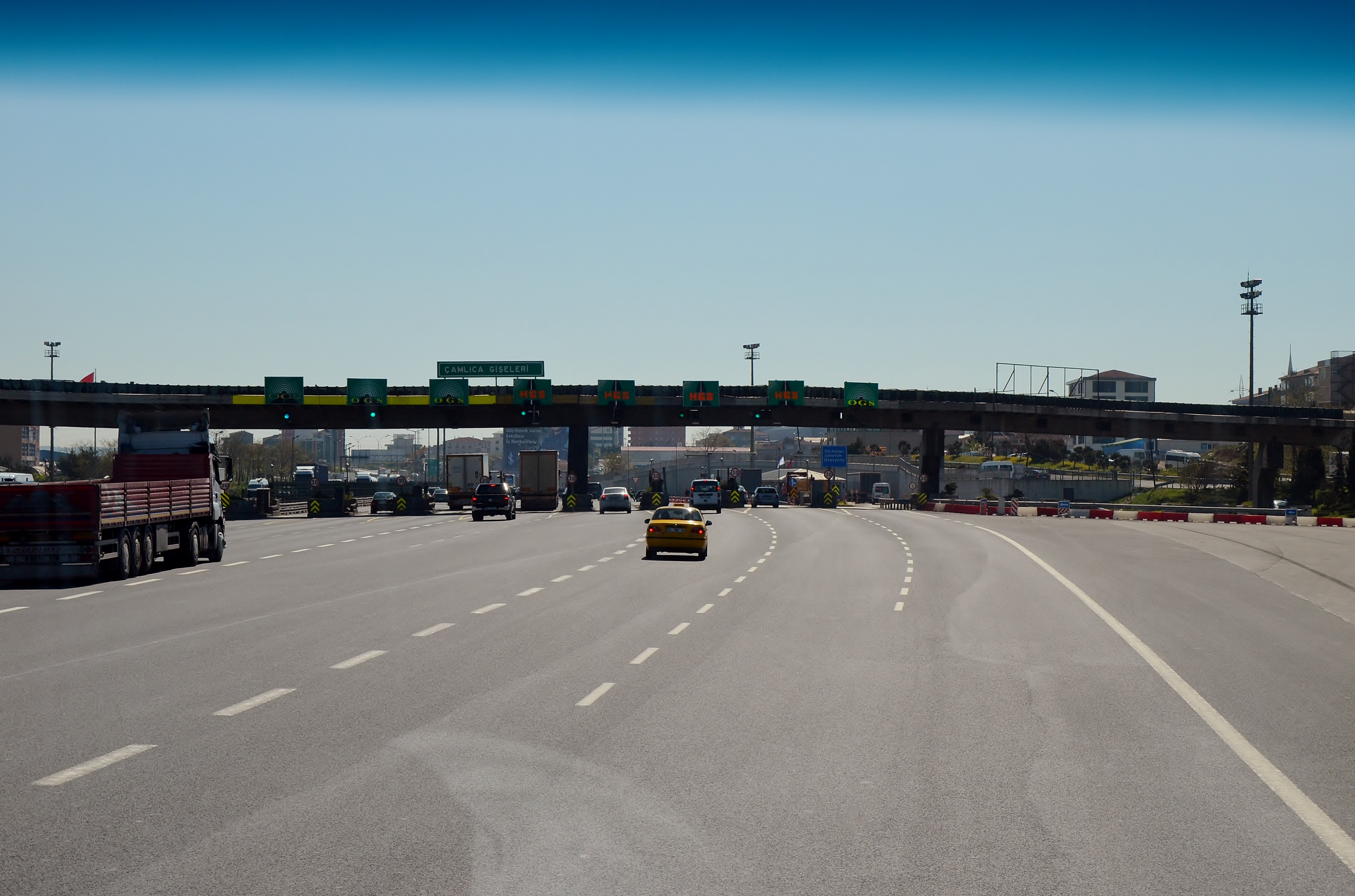
Çamlıca Toll plaza on the east end of Otoyol 4 in Istanbul.

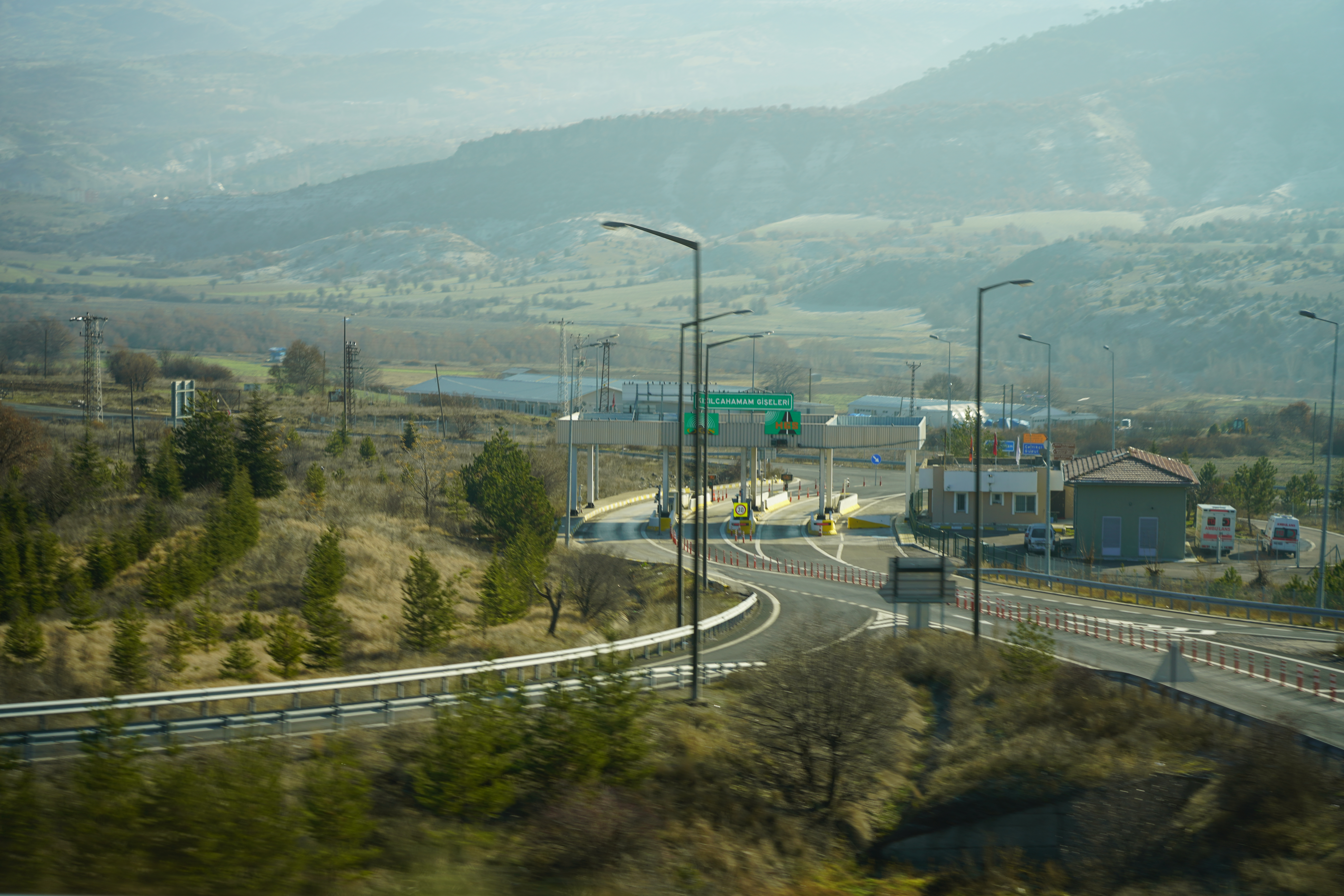
Kızılcahamam Toll plaza on the O-4

Otoyol 4 (English: Motorway 4), named Anatolian Motorway (Turkish: Anadolu Otoyolu) and abbreviated as O-4, is a toll motorway connecting the northwestern Marmara region to the Central Anatolia Region in Turkey. It runs parallel to the D.100 for more than half of its length and then parallels the D750 for most of the eastern half. The O-4 is a major expressway in Turkey as it connects eastern Istanbul and the heavily urbanized northeastern shore of the Sea of Marmara to the nation's capital, Ankara. The O-4 also makes up part of the International E-road network E80 and E89 as well as the AH-1 of the Asian Highway Network.

The O-4 is the third longest completed motorway in Turkey spanning 379 km (235 mi), behind Otoyol 21 and Otoyol 5. Construction of the O-4 began in 1984 and was widely completed in 1992 except for a short gap through the mountains west of Bolu. This gap was connected in 2006, with the opening of the Mount Bolu Tunnel.

== Route description ==
=== Istanbul ===
The O-4 begins at the intersection with the O-1. The next interchange is in northern Ataşehir with the O-2 . After the motorway crosses Necip Fazıl Boulevard, the last toll-free exit in Istanbul (K1), the O-4 becomes a toll-motorway at the Çamlıca toll booths. The first tolled exit is exit K2, which is the Samandıra-Kartal connector, that is the first of several connections to the D.100. Exit K3 connects to Fatih Boulevard in Sultanbeyi. The interchange with the O-7 is located just as the O-4 enters the district of Pendik. Exit K4 is located right on the eastern border of the Pendik district and connects to the Sabiha Gökçen Airport. After exit K4, the O-4 enters the last district in Istanbul, Tuzla. Exit K5 (Orhanlı junction) also offers a connection to the Sabiha Gökçen airport as well as the Kurtköy-Pendik connector. The O-4 continues through northern Tuzla, passing through mostly industrial parks until leaving the Istanbul Province and entering the Kocaeli Province.

=== Kocaeli ===
After crossing into Kocaeli, exit K6 is the Şekerpınar-Çayırova connector in Şekerpınar. The O-4 traverses through northern Gebze until exit K7, which is a direct connection to the D-100. After crossing over the D-100, the O-4 interchanges with the northern end of the O-5 at the unnumbered Mualimköy junction. Following the junction, the motorway runs along the heavily industrialized northern shore of the Izmit Bay with exits at Diliskelisi (K8) and Hereke (K9, K10). Between Hereke and Körfez the motorway runs directly next to the D-100 and the Istanbul-Ankara railway along the shoreline until the motorway enters Körfez. Once in the city, Exit K11 connects to the D.100. Shortly after K11, an unmarked exit to a KGM employee housing facility. The exit is not open to public traffic although cars may use the overpass to make a U-turn. After passing a service area, the O-4 enters the city of İzmit. Exit K12 connects to the D.100 but only for traffic from/to Istanbul. The route then heads north and travels around the hilly northern perimeter of the city, passing through two tunnels and a viaduct. The O-4 crosses over the D.605, which can be accessed via Exit K12. After bypassing Izmit, the motorway heads southeast, crossing over the D.100 (Exit K13) in Bahçelievler. After the exit, the route enters Sakarya Province.

=== Sakarya ===
Otoyol 4 parallels the Istanbul-Ankara railway along the southern shore of Lake Sapanca except for its short bypass around the town of Sapanca. Exit K15 connects to the town, via İzmit Avenue. After Sapanca, the otoyol passes the south of Adapazarı, via K16, at Arifiye. Otoyol 4 reaches Akyazı and at here, the otoyol conneted with the eastern terminus of O-7. After passing K18 which connets to Hendek, Otoyol 4 enters Düzce Province.

=== Düzce ===
Otoyol 4 passes the south of Gümüşova, the city of Düzce and north of Kaynaşlı. After Kaynaşlı, the otoyol enters a valley by passing through a series of viaducts and enters Bolu Province.

=== Bolu ===
After passing the valley via viaducts, Otoyol 4 passing under the Mount Bolu, via Mount Bolu Tunnel, which is the longest tunnel on the route. After passing the tunnel, the route reaches a large service area where it contains a shopping mall on the Ankara direction and hotel services on the Istanbul direction. Shortly after the servcie area, the K21 exit connects to the Lake Abant National Parl, 22km away from the toll plaza. The Otoyol reaches the city of Bolu, connecting via K22 on the west and K23 on the east side of the city. After passing Yeniçağa, the otoyol reaches Gerede where an important K26 exit which not only connects to Gerede but also a major junction for the D100 which passes through the northern part of the Anatolia until reaches to Gürbulak Border Crossing. After Gerede, the Otoyol turns to the southern direction and enters Ankara Province.

=== Ankara ===
When Otoyol 4 enters Ankara Province, it passes from the hilly geography via a very curvy route. The K27 and K28 exits respectively connects to Çamlıdere and Kızılcahamam. The otoyol continues to the south and reaches Kahramankazan, where the tolled section of the route ends. Following the Akıncı Toll Plaza, the Otoyol eventually reaches the city of Ankara and terminates at K1 where connected with Otoyol 20, also known as Ankara Ring Road, near Eryaman.

== Exit List ==
Province	District	km	mi	Exit	Destination	Notes
Istanbul	Ümraniye/Ataşehir	0	0	K10	P.34-12 O-1 Çamlıca K13 junction connector O-2 Anadolu otoyolu K10 junction	O-1—O-2 connector road
Istanbul	Ümraniye/Ataşehir	3.3	2.1	K1	İmes junction	O-4 route
Istanbul	Ümraniye/Ataşehir			Samandıra Toll Plaza		
Istanbul	Sancaktepe	7.9	4.9	K2	Samandıra K2 junction connector P.34-27	O-4 Connector to D.100
Istanbul	Sultanbeyli	12.6	7.8	K3	Sultanbeyli K3 junction—Fatih Blvd,Sultanbeyli	
Istanbul	Sultanbeyli	17.7	11	K3-1	Mecidiye K3-1 Junction connector to O-7 Mecidiye K17 junction	O-4 Connector to O-7
Istanbul	pendik	20	12.4	K4	Kurtköy K4 junction connector to P.34-28 Pendik	Connector to D.100 and D.020
Istanbul	Tuzla	21.6	13.4	K5	Orhanlı K5 junction connector to S. Gökçen Airport	
Kocaeli	Çayırova	29.6	18.4	K6	Şekerpınar K6 junction connector to Çayırova	Connector to D.100
Kocaeli	Çayırova	31.4	19.5	K6-1	Muhsin Yazıcıoğlu Ave. — Gebze OSB	
Kocaeli	Gebze	39.8	24.7	K7	D.100 — Gebze	
Kocaeli	Gebze	42.2	26.2	K7-1	MuallimKöy Junction connector to Osman Gazi Bridge, Yalova, then İzmir	O-5
Kocaeli	Dilovası	46	28.6	K8	Liman Ave. — Dilovası	
Kocaeli	Körfez	52.1	32.3	K9	D.100 — Hereke	Eastbound exit, westbound entrance
Kocaeli	Körfez	54.5	33.7	K10	D.100 — Hereke	Eastbound entrance, westbound exit
Kocaeli	Körfez	67.9	42.2	K11	D.100 — Körfez	
Kocaeli	Derince	75.1	46.7	K12	D.100 — İzmit	Eastbound exit, westbound entrance
Kocaeli	İzmit			Korutepe Tunnel		
Kocaeli	İzmit			Gültepe Tunnel		
Kocaeli	İzmit	86.8	53.9	K13	D.605 — İzmit, Kandıra	
Kocaeli	Kartepe	94.2	58.5	K14	D.100 — İzmit	
Sakarya	Sapanca	101.5	63.1	K15	P.54-52 — Sapanca	
Sakarya	Arifiye	114.1	70.9	K16	D.650 — Arifiye, Sakarya	
Sakarya	Akyazı	130.8	81.3	K17	D.140 — Akyazı	
Sakarya	Hendek	137.4	85.4	K18	Hendek connector — Hendek	Connector to D.100
Düzce	Düzce Merkez	169	105	K19	D.100 — Düzce	
Düzce	Düzce Merkez	189.8	117.9	K20	D.100 — Kaynaşlı	
Bolu	Bolu Merkez			Mount Bolu Tunnel		
Bolu	Bolu Merkez	200.9	124.8	K21	P.14-50 — Abant	
Bolu	Bolu Merkez	207.9	129.2	K22	D.100 — Bolu	Bolu west
Bolu	Bolu Merkez	227.1	141.1	K23	D.100 — Bolu	Bolu east
Bolu	Yeniçağa	249.6	155.1	K24	D.100 — Yeniçağa	
Bolu	Gerede	259.5	161.2	K25	P.14-05 — Dörtdivan	
Bolu	Gerede	266.2	165.4	K26	Gerede connector — Gerede / D.100 — Karabük	
Ankara	Çamlıdere	311.1	193.3	K27	P.06-86 — Çamlıdere	
Ankara	Kızılcahamam	326.9	203.1	K28	P.06-82 — Kızılcahamam, Güdül	
Ankara	Kazan			Kazan Toll Plaza		
Ankara	Kazan	358.7	223.5	K29	Fevzi Çakmak Ave. — Kahramankazan	
Ankara	Kazan	362.7	224.2	K30	P.06-75 — Mürted Air Base	
Ankara	Yenimahalle	371.7	231	K1	O-20 — Ankara	Ankara Beltway
1.000 mi = 1.609 km; 1.000 km = 0.621 mi: Tolled
