= Birecik Bridge =

Birecik Bridge Birecik Köprüsü
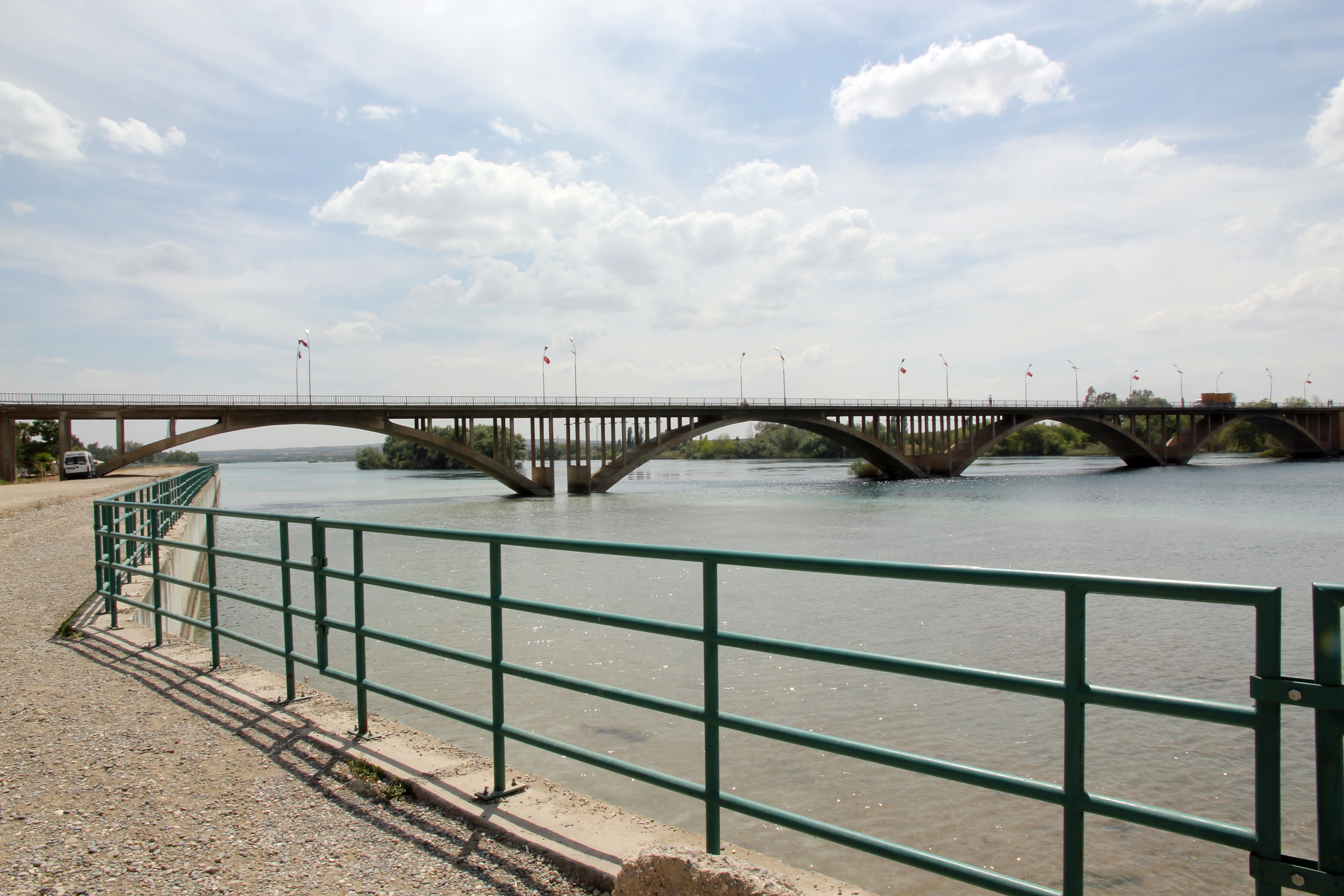
- Birecik bridge
- Coordinates: 37.0134°N 37.5826°E
- Carries: 2 lanes of D.400
- Crosses: Euphrates
- Locale: Birecik
- Named for: Town of Birecik
- Owner: General Directorate of Highways

Characteristics
- Material: Reinforced concrete
- Total length: 695 m (2,280 ft)
- Width: 11 m (36 ft)
- No. of spans: 5

History
- Constructed by: Amaç Ticaret Türk A.Ş.
- Construction start: 18 August 1951
- Construction end: March 1956; 70 years ago

Location
- Interactive map of Birecik Bridge

The Birecik Bridge is a 695 m (2,280 ft) long deck arch bridge carrying the D.400 across the Euphrates in Birecik, Turkey.

== Geography ==
The bridge is on the state highway D.400, which runs from southwest to southeast Turkey. It spans over Fırat River (Euphrates) at about 37°02′N 37°58′E. The river marks the boundary between Nizip district of Gaziantep Province and Birecik district of Şanlıurfa Province. Birecik is just at the east of the bridge and Nizip is 16 km (9.9 mi) to the west.

== Project and construction ==
Up to 1956, travel between Gaziantep and Şanlıurfa was difficult, for all vehicles had to transfer to primitive ferries over the Fırat River. The bridge project was one of the major projects of Turkey in the 1950s. The awarded company was Amaç Ticaret Türk AŞ. The governmental inspection was carried out by the General Directorate of Highways. The construction began in August 1951 and the bridge was completed in March 1956.

== Details ==
The length of the bridge is 695 m (2,280 ft) and it is 11 m (36 ft) wide with1 m (3.3 ft) on each side reserved for pedestrians. There are five arches over the river and fourteen sections over the land. At the time of its completion, it was the third longest bridge in Turkey, after the Karkamış Bridge and Uzunköprü Bridge.

== One of the Turkey's top 50 civil engineering projects ==
Turkish Chamber of Civil Engineers lists Birecik Bridge as one of the fifty civil engineering feats in Turkey, a list of remarkable engineering projects realized in the first 50 years of the chamber.
