= Tekfen Construction and Installation =

Turkish holding company

Tekfen Holding Co., Inc.
- Company type: Anonim Şirket
- Traded as: BİST: TKFEN
- Industry: Conglomerate
- Founded: 1956; 70 years ago
- Headquarters: Istanbul, Turkey
- Key people: Mehmet Erten (Chairman) Hakan Göral (President)
- Revenue: ▲ ₺58,190 million (Consolidated million TRY)(2024)
- Number of employees: 12,611 (2024)
- Website: www.tekfen.com.tr

Tekfen Holding Co., Inc. is a Turkish holding company.

== History ==
Founded in 1956 by civil engineers Feyyaz Berker, Nihat Gökyiğit, and Necati Akçağlılar, Tekfen Group is a Turkish conglomerate active in multiple sectors of the economy. Listed on the BIST 100 and Sustainability Indexes, Tekfen Holding operates primarily in three business segments: engineering and contracting, agricultural industry, and investment. The group comprises 38 companies and 13 subsidiaries operating in Turkey and abroad.

In 1999, the Tekfen Foundation for Education, Health, Culture, Art, and Protection of Natural Resources, commonly known as the Tekfen Foundation, was established.

== See also ==
- Turkish construction and contracting industry
- List of companies of Turkey
- SOCAR Tower
