= AH84 =

Road in Turkey

Asian Highway 84 (AH84) is a road in the Asian Highway Network running 1074 km (667 miles) from Doğubeyazıt to Mersin, Turkey. The route is concurrent with European route E90 and European route E99. The route is as follows:

== Turkey ==
- D.975 Road D975: Doğubeyazıt - Muradiye
- D.280 Road D280: Muradiye - Erciş
- D.290 Road D290: Erciş - Adilcevaz
- D.965 Road D965: Adilcevaz - Baykan
- D.360 Road D360: Baykan - Diyarbakır - Siverek
- D.885 Road D885: Siverek - Şanlıurfa
- Otoyol 52: Şanlıurfa - Gaziantep - Toprakkale - Adana
  - Branch Otoyol 53: Toprakkale - Iskenderun
- Otoyol 50: Adana
- Otoyol 51: Adana - Mersin
