= Otoyol 52 =

Highway in Turkey

O-52
- Adana-Şanlıurfa Motorway; Adana-Şanlıurfa Otoyolu

Route information
- Part of E90 / AH84
- Length: 365 km (227 mi)
- Existed: 1992–present

Major junctions
- From: O-51 in Yüreğir, Adana; O-53 in Ceyhan, Adana; O-53 in Toprakkale, Osmaniye; O-54 in Şehitkamil, Gaziantep; D.875 in Karaköprü, Şanlıurfa

- To: D.400 in Haliliye, Şanlıurfa

Location
- Country: Turkey
- Regions: Mediterranean, Southeastern Anatolia
- Provinces: Adana, Osmaniye, Gaziantep, Kahramanmaraş, Şanlıurfa
- Major cities: Adana, Ceyhan, Osmaniye, Gaziantep, Nizip, Şanlıurfa

Highway system
- Highways in Turkey; Motorways; List; State Highways; List
| ← O-51 | → O-53 |

Otoyol 52 (English: Motorway 52), abbreviated as O-52, a.k.a. Adana-Şanlıurfa Otoyolu (English: Adana-Şanlıurfa Motorway), is a toll motorway in the regions of Mediterranean and Southeastern Anatolia in Turkey, connecting the cities Adana and Şanlıurfa. The motorway is part of European route E90 and Asian Highway 84. The O-52 starts from the eastern terminus of The O-51, runs eastward through Osmaniye, Gaziantep and terminates east of Şanlıurfa.

The highway sustained damage in the 2023 Turkey–Syria earthquake.

== Exit list ==
| Province | District | km | mi | Exit | Destination | Notes |
|---|---|---|---|---|---|---|
| Adana | Yüreğir | 0.0 | 0.0 | K1 | Dr. Mithat Özsan Blv. | Continues as O-51 to Mersin |
| Adana | Sarıçam | | | K2 | D.815 — Pınarbaşı | |
| Adana | Sarıçam | | | K3 | İnönü Blv. | |
| Adana | Ceyhan | | | K4 | D.400 — Osmaniye | |
| Adana | Ceyhan | | | Yılankale Toll Plaza | | |
| Adana | Ceyhan | | | K5 | D.817 — Ceyhan | |
| Adana | Ceyhan | | | K6 | O-53 — İskenderun | Westbound entrance and eastbound exit |
| Osmaniye | Toprakkale | | | K7 | O-53 — İskenderun | Westbound exit and eastbound entrance |
| Osmaniye | Toprakkale | | | K8 | P.80-75 — Osmaniye | |
| Osmaniye | Osmaniye | | | K9 | P.80-50 — Toprakkale | |
| Osmaniye | Düziçi | | | K10 | P.80-01 — Düziçi | |
| Osmaniye | Bahçe | | | Taşoluk Tunnel | | |
| Osmaniye | Bahçe | | | K11 | D.400 — Bahçe | |
| Osmaniye | Bahçe | | | Ayran Tunnel | | |
| Osmaniye | Bahçe | | | Kızlaç Tunnel | | |
| Gaziantep | Nurdağı | | | Aslanlı Tunnel | | |
| Gaziantep | Nurdağı | | | K12 | D.825 — Nurdağı | |
| Kahramanmaraş | Narlı | | | K13 | D.835 — Narlı | |
| Gaziantep | Şehitkamil | | | K14 | D.835 — Gaziantep | |
| Gaziantep | Şehitkamil | | | K15 | D.835 — Gaziantep | |
| Gaziantep | Şehitkamil | | | K16 | O-54 (Gaziantep Bltwy) — D.400 West | |
| Gaziantep | Nizip | | | K17 | Nizip connector — Nizip | |
| Euphrates | | | | Euphrates Viaduct | | |
| Şanlıurfa | Birecik | | | K18 | Birecik connector — Birecik | |
| Şanlıurfa | Suruç | | | K19 | Suruç connector — Onbirnisan | |
| Şanlıurfa | Şanlıurfa | | | Şanlıurfa West Toll Plaza | | |
| Şanlıurfa | Şanlıurfa | | | K20 | Şanlıurfa West connector — Koçören | |
| Şanlıurfa | Şanlıurfa | | | K21 | D.885 — Şanlıurfa | |
| Şanlıurfa | Şanlıurfa | | | K22 | D.400 — Hakkari | |

Light blue indicates toll section of motorway.

== See also ==
- List of highways in Turkey
- Kızlaç Tunnel
- Aslanlı Tunnel
- Ayran Tunnel
- Taşoluk Tunnel
