= Qatur (disambiguation) =

Qotur is a city in Khoy County, West Azerbaijan Province, Iran.

Qatur or Qotur or Gottour (Persian: قطور and Arabic: قطور) may also refer to places in:

== Egypt ==
- Qutur, Egypt, a city in Gharbia Governorate

== Iran ==
- Qatur, Shahin Dezh, West Azerbaijan Province
- Qotur River, West Azerbaijan Province
- Qotur District, in Khoy County
- Qotur Rural District, in Khoy County
