= Kalt, Iran =

Kalt (Persian: كلت) in Iran may refer to:

- Kalt, Khuzestan
- Kalt-e Olya, West Azerbaijan Province
- Kalt-e Sofla, West Azerbaijan Province
