= Najibabad, Iran =

Najibabad نجيب اباد
- Village
- Location within Iran
- Coordinates: 38°31′04″N 44°29′22″E
- Country: Iran
- Province: West Azerbaijan
- County: Khoy
- Bakhsh: Qatur
- Rural District: Qatur

Population (2006)
  - Total: 133
- Time zone: UTC+3:30 (IRST)
  - Summer (DST): UTC+4:30 (IRDT)

Najibabad (Persian: نجيب اباد, also Romanized as Najībābād) is a village in Qatur Rural District, Qatur District, Khoy County, West Azerbaijan Province, Iran. At the 2006 census, its population was 133, in 23 families.
