= Zeri (disambiguation) =

Zeri may refer to:

- Zeri, a commune in Italy
- Zeri, Iran, a village in Iran
- Zeri Rural District, in Iran
- A codename for Adobe's HTTP Dynamic Streaming
- Federico Zeri, Italian historian
- Zero Emissions Research and Initiatives
- Zeri, a playable character in the video game League of Legends
