= Kalt-e Olya =

Kalt-e Olya كلتعليا
- Village
- Location within Iran
- Coordinates: 38°33′23″N 44°30′25″E
- Country: Iran
- Province: West Azerbaijan
- County: Khoy
- Bakhsh: Qatur
- Rural District: Qatur

Population (2006)
  - Total: 292
- Time zone: UTC+3:30 (IRST)
  - Summer (DST): UTC+4:30 (IRDT)

Kalt-e Olya (Persian: كلتعليا, also Romanized as Kalt-e ‘Olyā; also known as Kalt-e Bālā and Koltābād) is a village in Qatur Rural District, Qatur District, Khoy County, West Azerbaijan Province, Iran. At the 2006 census, its population was 292, in 50 families.
