= ACS Mersin =

Glass factory in Mersin, Turkey

- Location within Turkey
- Built: 1969
- Location: Yenitaşkent, Mersin, Turkey; Mersin, Turkey
- Coordinates: 36°51′50″N 34°06′43″E
- Industry: Glass
- Employees: 461

ACS Mersin is a glass factory in Mersin, Turkey. ACS stands for Anadolu Cam Sanayii ("Anatolian Glass Industry")

The factory is at 36°51′50″N 34°06′43″E in Yenitaşkent neighborhood to the north of the Turkish state highway D.400 which connects Mersin to Tarsus. Its distance to Mersin is about 13 kilometres (8.1 mi).

The factory was put into operation in 1969. In 1975, it was acquired by Şişecam Group of Companies. In 1988, NNPB (narrow neck press and blow) technology was successfully used for the first time in Turkey at ACS. Current annual glass production is 260 822 metric tons. The number of employees is 461. But after the planned instauration the annual production will rise to 366685 metric tons and the number of employees will increase to 483.
