= Chalyan =

Village in West Azerbaijan province, Iran

Chalyan Persian: چاليان
- Village
- Location within Iran
- Coordinates: 38°26′23″N 44°32′58″E
- Country: Iran
- Province: West Azerbaijan
- County: Khoy
- District: Qotur
- Rural District: Zeri

Population (2016)
  - Total: 652
- Time zone: UTC+3:30 (IRST)

Chalyan (Persian: چاليان) (Note: Also romanized as Chālyān) is a village in Zeri Rural District of Qotur District in Khoy County, West Azerbaijan province, Iran.

== Demographics ==
=== Population ===
At the time of the 2006 National Census, the village's population was 652 in 135 households. The following census in 2011 counted 699 people in 168 households. The 2016 census measured the population of the village as 652 people in 163 households.
