= Givaran, West Azerbaijan =

Village in West Azerbaijan province, Iran

Givaran Persian: گيوران
- Village
- Location within Iran
- Coordinates: 38°25′53″N 44°23′09″E
- Country: Iran
- Province: West Azerbaijan
- County: Khoy
- District: Qotur
- Rural District: Qotur

Population (2016)
  - Total: 1,067
- Time zone: UTC+3:30 (IRST)

Givaran (Persian: گيوران) (Note: Also romanized as Gīvarān) is a village in Qotur Rural District of Qotur District in Khoy County, West Azerbaijan province, Iran.

== Demographics ==
=== Population ===
At the time of the 2006 National Census, the village's population was 907 in 159 households. The following census in 2011 counted 1,012 people in 196 households. The 2016 census measured the population of the village as 1,067 people in 249 households.
