= Kalt-e Sofla =

Kalt-e Sofla كلتسفلي
- Village
- Location within Iran
- Coordinates: 38°31′53″N 44°29′41″E
- Country: Iran
- Province: West Azerbaijan
- County: Khoy
- Bakhsh: Qatur
- Rural District: Qatur

Population (2006)
  - Total: 485
- Time zone: UTC+3:30 (IRST)
  - Summer (DST): UTC+4:30 (IRDT)

Kalt-e Sofla (Persian: كلتسفلي, also Romanized as Kalt-e Soflá; also known as Kalt-e Pā'īn) is a village in Qatur Rural District, Qatur District, Khoy County, West Azerbaijan Province, Iran. At the 2006 census, its population was 485, in 87 families.
