= Almalu, West Azerbaijan =

Village in West Azerbaijan province, Iran

Almalu Persian: المالو
- Village
- Location within Iran
- Coordinates: 38°29′34″N 44°40′14″E
- Country: Iran
- Province: West Azerbaijan
- County: Khoy
- District: Qotur
- Rural District: Zeri

Population (2016)
  - Total: 813
- Time zone: UTC+3:30 (IRST)

Almalu (Persian: المالو) (Note: Also romanized as Ālmālū) is a village in Zeri Rural District of Qotur District in Khoy County, West Azerbaijan province, Iran.

== Demographics ==
=== Population ===
At the time of the 2006 National Census, the village's population was 913 in 203 households. The following census in 2011 counted 919 people in 219 households. The 2016 census measured the population of the village as 813 people in 231 households.
