= Qareh Gol, Khoy =

Village in West Azerbaijan province, Iran

Qareh Gol Persian: قره گل
- Village
- Location within Iran
- Coordinates: 38°23′42″N 44°38′53″E
- Country: Iran
- Province: West Azerbaijan
- County: Khoy
- District: Qotur
- Rural District: Zeri

Population (2016)
  - Total: 97
- Time zone: UTC+3:30 (IRST)

Qareh Gol (Persian: قره گل) (Note: Also romanized as Qarah Gol) is a village in Zeri Rural District of Qotur District in Khoy County, West Azerbaijan province, Iran.

== Demographics ==
=== Population ===
At the time of the 2006 National Census, the village's population was 153 in 25 households. The following census in 2011 counted 88 people in 17 households. The 2016 census measured the population of the village as 97 people in 23 households.
