= Qilehliq =

Village in West Azerbaijan province, Iran

Qilehliq Persian: قيله ليق
- Village
- Location within Iran
- Coordinates: 38°27′54″N 44°43′18″E
- Country: Iran
- Province: West Azerbaijan
- County: Khoy
- District: Qotur
- Rural District: Zeri

Population (2016)
  - Total: 632
- Time zone: UTC+3:30 (IRST)

Qilehliq (Persian: قيله ليق) (Note: Also romanized as Qīlehlīq) is a village in Zeri Rural District of Qotur District in Khoy County, West Azerbaijan province, Iran.

== Demographics ==
=== Population ===
At the time of the 2006 National Census, the village's population was 645 in 98 households. The following census in 2011 counted 775 people in 157 households. The 2016 census measured the population of the village as 631 people in 149 households.
