= Tarimish =

Village in West Azerbaijan province, Iran

Tarimish Persian: تاريميش
- Village
- Location within Iran
- Coordinates: 38°25′22″N 44°36′14″E
- Country: Iran
- Province: West Azerbaijan
- County: Khoy
- District: Qotur
- Rural District: Zeri

Population (2016)
  - Total: 284
- Time zone: UTC+3:30 (IRST)

Tarimish (Persian: تاريميش) (Note: Also romanized as Tārīmīsh) is a village in Zeri Rural District of Qotur District in Khoy County, West Azerbaijan province, Iran.

== Demographics ==
=== Population ===
At the time of the 2006 National Census, the village's population was 347 in 86 households. The following census in 2011 counted 354 people in 102 households. The 2016 census measured the population of the village as 284 people in 72 households.
