= Salehabad, Khoy =

Village in West Azerbaijan province, Iran

Salehabad Persian: صالح اباد
- Village
- Location within Iran
- Coordinates: 38°23′03″N 44°34′21″E
- Country: Iran
- Province: West Azerbaijan
- County: Khoy
- District: Qotur
- Rural District: Zeri

Population (2016)
  - Total: 91
- Time zone: UTC+3:30 (IRST)

Salehabad (Persian: صالح اباد) (Note: Also romanized as Şāleḩābād) is a village in Zeri Rural District of Qotur District in Khoy County, West Azerbaijan province, Iran.

== Demographics ==
=== Population ===
At the time of the 2006 National Census, the village's population was 123 in 24 households. The following census in 2011 counted 94 people in 21 households. The 2016 census measured the population of the village as 91 people in 25 households.
