= Garnavik =

Village in West Azerbaijan province, Iran

Garnavik Persian: گرناويك
- Village
- Location within Iran
- Coordinates: 38°24′31″N 44°24′46″E
- Country: Iran
- Province: West Azerbaijan
- County: Khoy
- District: Qotur
- Rural District: Qotur

Population (2016)
  - Total: 1,069
- Time zone: UTC+3:30 (IRST)

Garnavik (Persian: گرناويك) (Note: Also romanized as Garnāvīk and Gernāvīk; also known as Karnāvīk) is a village in Qotur Rural District of Qotur District in Khoy County, West Azerbaijan province, Iran.

== Demographics ==
=== Population ===
At the time of the 2006 National Census, the village's population was 1,022 in 175 households. The following census in 2011 counted 1,307 people in 271 households. The 2016 census measured the population of the village as 1,069 people in 255 households.
