= Habash-e Olya =

Village in West Azerbaijan province, Iran

Habash-e Olya Persian: حبش عليا
- Village
- Location within Iran
- Coordinates: 38°29′25″N 44°27′45″E
- Country: Iran
- Province: West Azerbaijan
- County: Khoy
- District: Qotur
- Rural District: Qotur

Population (2016)
  - Total: 1,200
- Time zone: UTC+3:30 (IRST)

Habash-e Olya (Persian: حبش عليا) (Note: Also romanized as Ḩabash-e ‘Olyā; also known as Ḩabashī Bālā, Ḩabashī-ye Bālā, and Ḩabashī-ye ‘Olyā) is a village in Qotur Rural District of Qotur District in Khoy County, West Azerbaijan province, Iran.

== Demographics ==
=== Population ===
At the time of the 2006 National Census, the village's population was 1,269 in 221 households. The following census in 2011 counted 1,382 people in 268 households. The 2016 census measured the population of the village as 1,200 people in 274 households.
