= Ruyan =

Ruyan may refer to:

- Dragonite International Limited, formerly Ruyan, a pharmaceutical company in Hong Kong

== Places ==
- Ruyan (district), a part of Mazandaran Province, Iran
- Ruyan, Semnan, a village in Semnan Province, Iran
- Ruyan, West Azerbaijan, a village in West Azerbaijan Province, Iran

== See also ==
- Royan
