= Habash-e Sofla =

Village in West Azerbaijan province, Iran

Habash-e Sofla Persian: حبش سفلي
- Village
- Location within Iran
- Coordinates: 38°28′52″N 44°28′16″E
- Country: Iran
- Province: West Azerbaijan
- County: Khoy
- District: Qotur
- Rural District: Qotur

Population (2016)
  - Total: 1,209
- Time zone: UTC+3:30 (IRST)

Habash-e Sofla (Persian: حبش سفلي) (Note: Also romanized as Ḩabash-e Soflá) is a village in Qotur Rural District of Qotur District in Khoy County, West Azerbaijan province, Iran.

== Demographics ==
=== Population ===
At the time of the 2006 National Census, the village's population was 1,331 in 240 households. The following census in 2011 counted 1,463 people in 283 households. The 2016 census measured the population of the village as 1,209 people in 287 households.
