= Gugerd, West Azerbaijan =

Village in West Azerbaijan province, Iran

Gugerd Persian: گوگرد
- Village
- Location within Iran
- Coordinates: 38°30′15″N 44°33′46″E
- Country: Iran
- Province: West Azerbaijan
- County: Khoy
- District: Qatur
- Rural District: Zeri

Population (2016)
  - Total: 1,989
- Time zone: UTC+3:30 (IRST)

Gugerd (Persian: گوگرد) (Note: Also romanized as Gūgerd) is a village in Zeri Rural District of Qatur District in Khoy County, West Azerbaijan province, Iran.

== Demographics ==
=== Population ===
At the time of the 2006 National Census, the village's population was 2,407 in 415 households. The following census in 2011 counted 2,148 people in 449 households. The 2016 census measured the population of the village as 1,989 people in 469 households. It was the most populous village in its rural district.
