= Makhin =

Village in West Azerbaijan province, Iran

Makhin Persian: مخين
- Village
- Location within Iran
- Coordinates: 38°27′49″N 44°29′50″E
- Country: Iran
- Province: West Azerbaijan
- County: Khoy
- District: Qotur
- Rural District: Qotur

Population (2016)
  - Total: 1,306
- Time zone: UTC+3:30 (IRST)

Makhin (Persian: مخين) (Note: Also romanized as Makhīn) is a village in Qotur Rural District of Qotur District in Khoy County, West Azerbaijan province, Iran.

== Demographics ==
=== Population ===
At the time of the 2006 National Census, the village's population was 1,170 in 229 households. The following census in 2011 counted 1,327 people in 321 households. The 2016 census measured the population of the village as 1,306 people in 338 households. It was the most populous village in its rural district.
