= Balajuk =

Village in West Azerbaijan province, Iran

Balajuk Persian: بلجوك
- Village
- Location within Iran
- Coordinates: 38°32′01″N 44°20′23″E
- Country: Iran
- Province: West Azerbaijan
- County: Khoy
- District: Qotur
- Rural District: Qotur

Population (2016)
  - Total: 724
- Time zone: UTC+3:30 (IRST)

Balajuk (Persian: بلجوك) (Note: Also romanized as Balajūk) is a village in Qotur Rural District of Qotur District in Khoy County, West Azerbaijan province, Iran.

== Demographics ==
=== Population ===
At the time of the 2006 National Census, the village's population was 742 in 129 households. The following census in 2011 counted 836 people in 204 households. The 2016 census measured the population of the village as 724 people in 194 households.
