= Tarsabad =

Village in West Azerbaijan province, Iran

Tarsabad Persian: ترس اباد
- Village
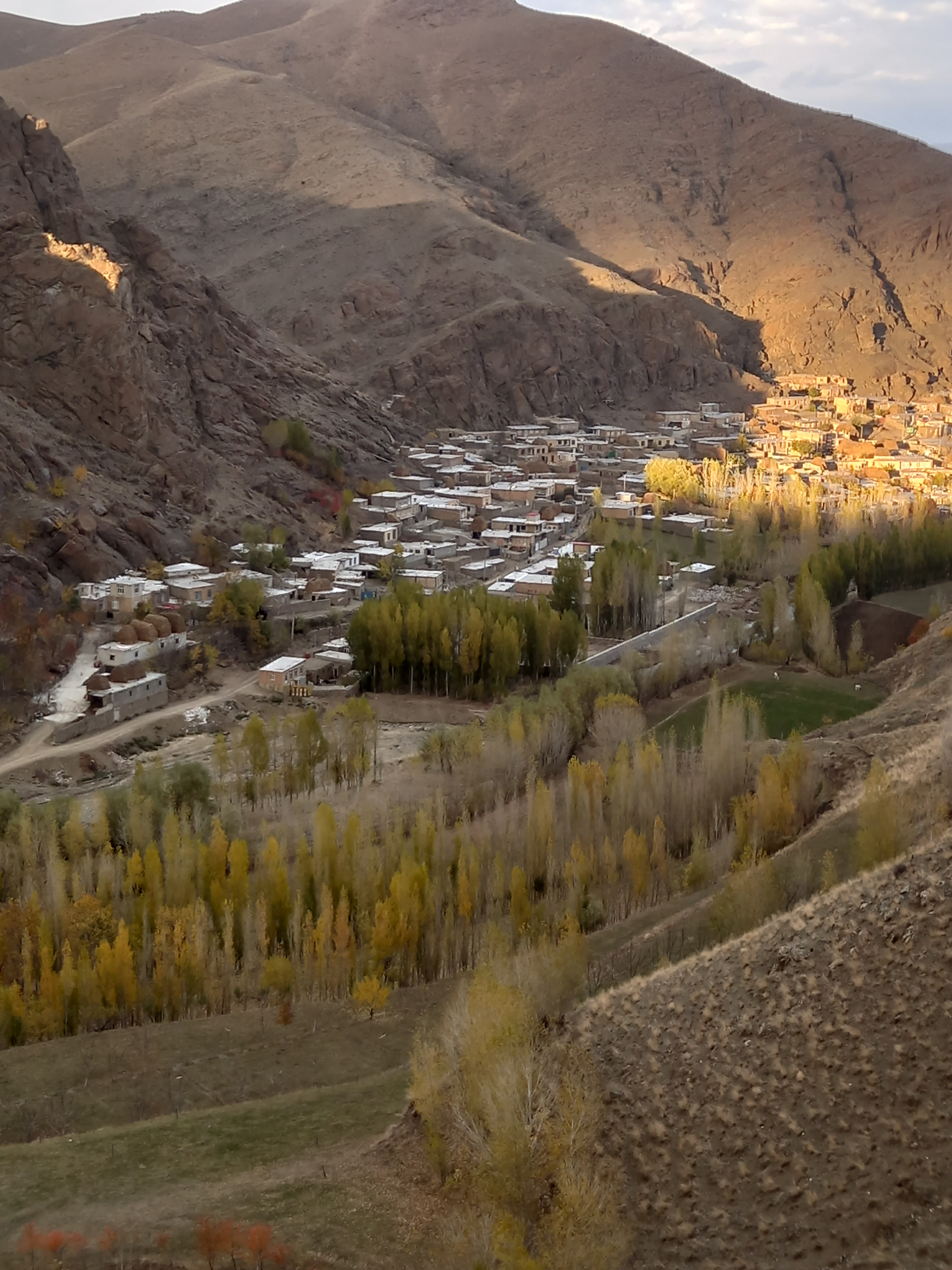
- The village of Tarsabad

- Location within Iran
- Coordinates: 38°24′20″N 44°21′28″E
- Country: Iran
- Province: West Azerbaijan
- County: Khoy
- District: Qotur
- Rural District: Qotur

Population (2016)
  - Total: 571
- Time zone: UTC+3:30 (IRST)

Tarsabad (Persian: ترس اباد) (Note: Also romanized as Tarsābād) is a village in Qotur Rural District of Qotur District in Khoy County, West Azerbaijan province, Iran.

== Demographics ==
=== Population ===
At the time of the 2006 National Census, the village's population was 539 in 104 households. The following census in 2011 counted 625 people in 130 households. The 2016 census measured the population of the village as 571 people in 140 households.
