= Çetenli =

Çetenli may refer to:

- Çetenli, Doğubayazıt, Agri Province, Turkey
- Çetenli, Altınözü, Hatay Province, Turkey
