= Doğubayazıt Reeds =

Coordinates: 39°37′10″N 44°05′20″E

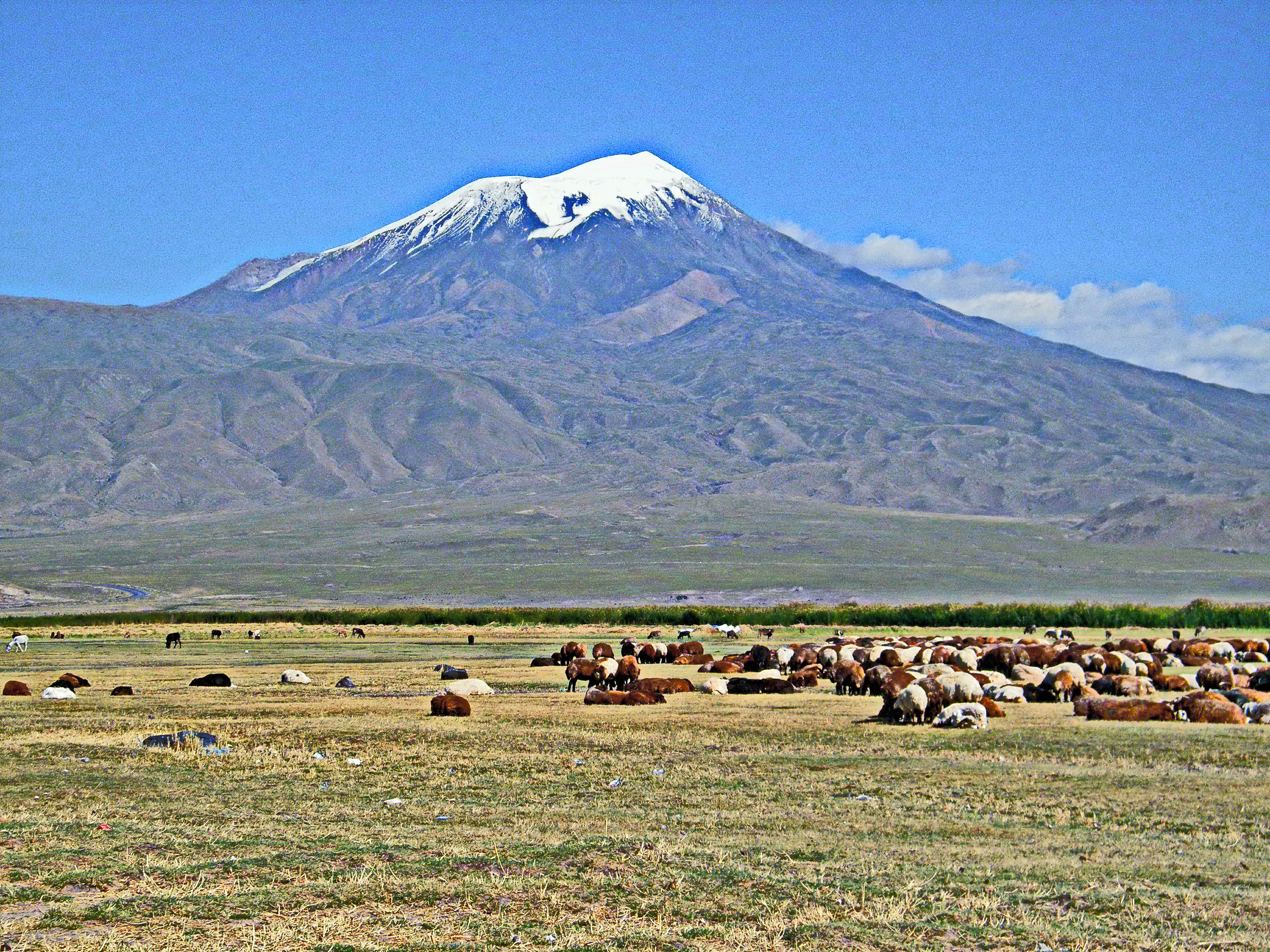
Wetlands around Karabulak village

Doğubayazıt Reeds (Turkish: Doğubayazıt Sazlıkları) is a wetland in northeastern Turkey. It is located on the western slopes of Mount Ararat.

== Geology and geomorphology ==
The wetland lies between Mount Zor (3196 m), a branch of the Karasu Aras Mountains, on the north-northwest, Mount Akyayla (2543 m) and Tendürek Mountain on the south, and Mount Ararat on the northeast. The basin is separated from the Doğubayazıt-Gürbulak groove in the southeast by a threshold of volcanic materials. It consists of large and small freshwater springs located in a depression basin, with vegetation consisting of large reeds. Saz Lake near Karabulak is one of its largest waterbodies.
