= Kutanabad =

Village in West Azerbaijan province, Iran

Kutanabad Persian: كوتان اباد
- Village
- Location within Iran
- Coordinates: 38°25′27″N 44°26′19″E
- Country: Iran
- Province: West Azerbaijan
- County: Khoy
- District: Qotur
- Rural District: Qotur

Population (2016)
  - Total: 603
- Time zone: UTC+3:30 (IRST)

Kutanabad (Persian: كوتان اباد) (Note: Also romanized as Kūtānābād) is a village in Qotur Rural District of Qotur District in Khoy County, West Azerbaijan province, Iran.

== Demographics ==
=== Population ===
At the time of the 2006 National Census, the village's population was 549 in 107 households. The following census in 2011 counted 695 people in 155 households. The 2016 census measured the population of the village as 603 people in 152 households.
