= Razi, West Azerbaijan =

Village in West Azerbaijan province, Iran

Razi Persian: رازي
- Village
- Location within Iran
- Coordinates: 38°29′13″N 44°20′32″E
- Country: Iran
- Province: West Azerbaijan
- County: Khoy
- District: Qotur
- Rural District: Qotur

Population (2016)
  - Total: 914
- Time zone: UTC+3:30 (IRST)

Razi (Persian: رازي) (Note: Also romanized as Rāzī) is a village in Qotur Rural District of Qotur District in Khoy County, West Azerbaijan province, Iran. It contains a border crossing linking it to Kapıköy in Turkey.

== Demographics ==
=== Population ===
At the time of the 2006 National Census, the village's population was 753 in 129 households. The following census in 2011 counted 904 people in 211 households. The 2016 census measured the population of the village as 914 people in 232 households.
