= Hastehjuk =

Village in West Azerbaijan province, Iran

Hastehjuk Persian: هسته جوك
- Village
- Location within Iran
- Coordinates: 38°24′09″N 44°26′55″E
- Country: Iran
- Province: West Azerbaijan
- County: Khoy
- District: Qotur
- Rural District: Qotur

Population (2016)
  - Total: 584
- Time zone: UTC+3:30 (IRST)

Hastehjuk (Persian: هسته جوك) (Note: Also romanized as Hastehjūk; also known as Hasteh Jīk) is a village in Qotur Rural District of Qotur District in Khoy County, West Azerbaijan province, Iran.

== Demographics ==
=== Population ===
At the time of the 2006 National Census, the village's population was 503 in 101 households. The following census in 2011 counted 630 people in 133 households. The 2016 census measured the population of the village as 584 people in 132 households.
