= Kafacherin =

Village in West Azerbaijan province, Iran

Kafacherin Persian: كفچرين
- Village
- Location within Iran
- Coordinates: 38°27′19″N 44°38′38″E
- Country: Iran
- Province: West Azerbaijan
- County: Khoy
- District: Qotur
- Rural District: Zeri

Population (2016)
  - Total: 591
- Time zone: UTC+3:30 (IRST)

Kafacherin (Persian: كفچرين) (Note: Also romanized as Kafacherīn; also known as Kafarchīn) is a village in Zeri Rural District of Qotur District in Khoy County, West Azerbaijan province, Iran.

== Demographics ==
=== Population ===
At the time of the 2006 National Census, the village's population was 564 in 82 households. The following census in 2011 counted 676 people in 148 households. The 2016 census measured the population of the village as 591 people in 132 households.
