= Al Sormeh =

Village in West Azerbaijan province, Iran

Al Sormeh Persian: السرمه
- Village
- Location within Iran
- Coordinates: 38°26′04″N 44°30′48″E
- Country: Iran
- Province: West Azerbaijan
- County: Khoy
- District: Qotur
- Rural District: Zeri

Population (2016)
  - Total: 605
- Time zone: UTC+3:30 (IRST)

Al Sormeh (Persian: السرمه) (Note: Also known as ‘Alī Sūrmeh (علي سورمه)) is a village in Zeri Rural District of Qotur District in Khoy County, West Azerbaijan province, Iran.

== Demographics ==
=== Population ===
At the time of the 2006 National Census, the village's population was 730 in 114 households. The following census in 2011 counted 715 people in 139 households. The 2016 census measured the population of the village as 605 people in 139 households.
