= Iran–Turkey border =

International border

Iran-Turkey border مرز ترکیه و ایران İran–Türkiye sınırı

Characteristics
- Entities: Iran Turkey
- Length: 560 km (350 mi)

The Iran–Turkey border (Persian: مرز ترکیه و ایران; Turkish: İran–Türkiye sınırı) is 534 kilometres (332 miles) in length, and runs from the tripoint with Azerbaijan in the north to the tripoint with Iraq in the south. Should Turkey, which is a candidate for EU membership, accede to the EU, Iran will be a border neighbor with the European Union.

== Description ==
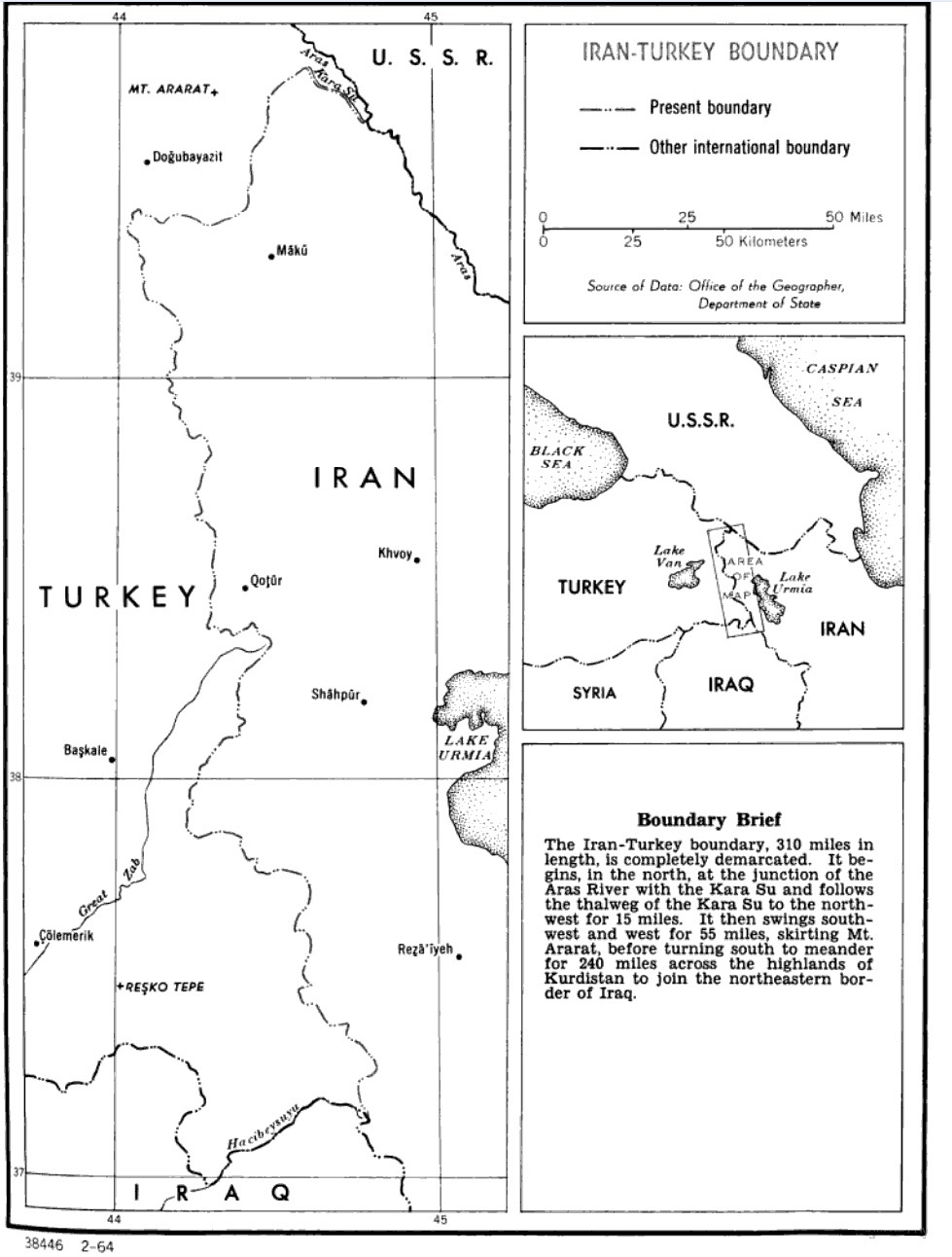
Map of the Iran-Turkey border by the United States Department of State

The border starts in the north at the tripoint with Azerbaijan's Nakhchivan Autonomous Republic on the Aras river. The border then proceeds to the north-west along the Karasu Çayı river, thereby granting Turkey a sliver of territory linking it to Azerbaijan. The border then proceeds south-west and then south via a series of irregular overland lines, down to the Iraqi tripoint. The border region is extremely mountainous and is populated mostly by Kurds on both sides.

== History ==
=== Ottoman era (1500s–1920) ===
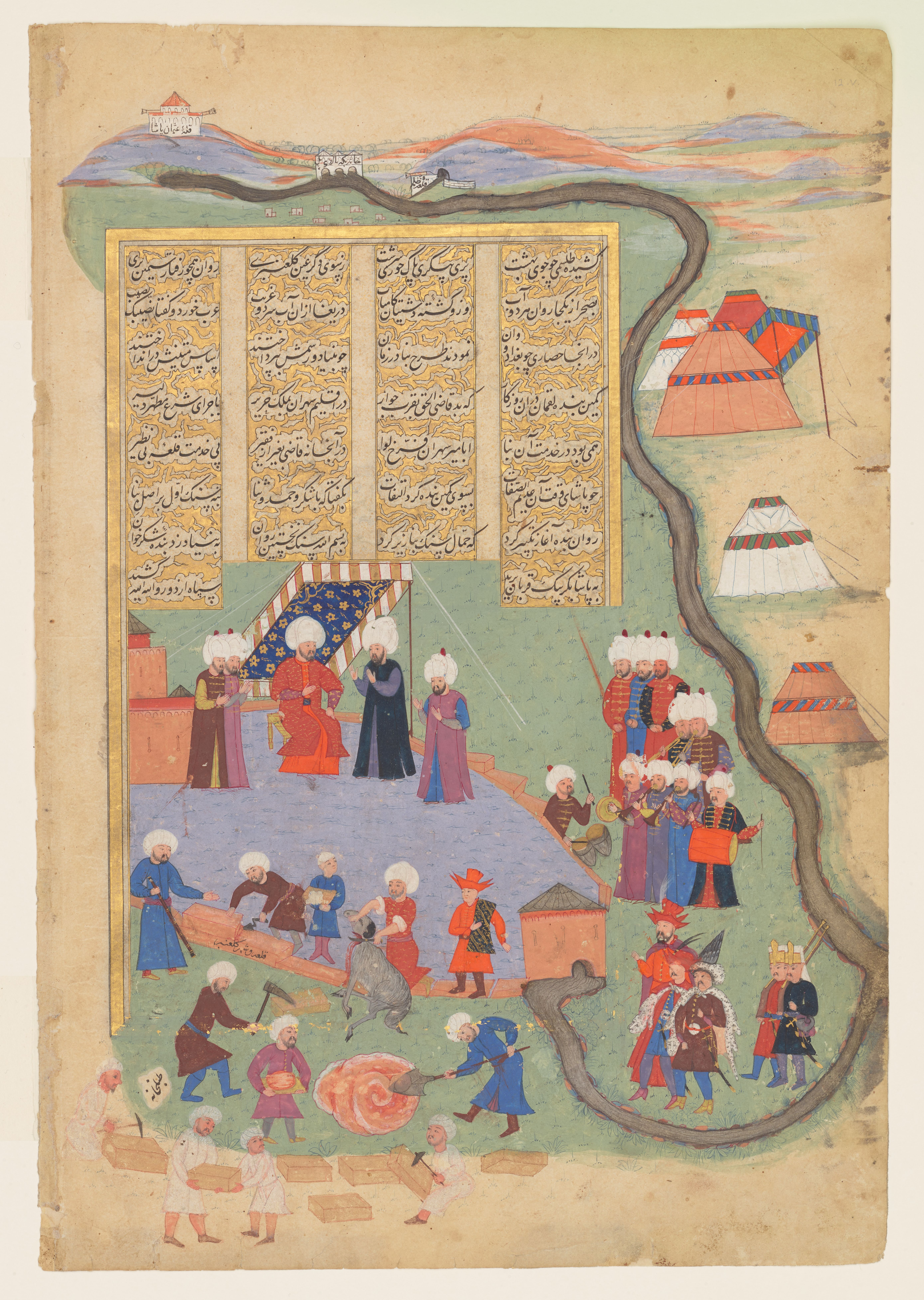
Fortifications along the Ottoman frontier with Safavid Iran, from the History of Sultan Süleyman, by Seyyid Lokman. Persian-language manuscript created in Constantinople (modern-day Istanbul), dated 1579

The Ottoman Empire had conquered much of what is now Iraq from Safavid Persia in the Ottoman–Safavid War of 1532–1555. The war concluded with the Peace of Amasya, by which Ottoman rule over the region was confirmed. Ottoman control of Mesopotamia and eastern Turkey was confirmed following the Ottoman–Safavid War (1623–1639), which ended with the Treaty of Zuhab. The Zuhab treaty stipulated that the boundary between the two empires would run between the Zagros Mountains and the Tigris River, though a precise line was not drawn at that time.

During the Ottoman–Hotaki War (1722–1727) the Ottomans invaded Iran in league with Russia, gaining large parts of north-west Iran via the Treaty of Hamedan. Another war followed in the 1740s which was ended by the Treaty of Kerden in 1746, which restored Iran's western provinces and re-affirmed the 1639 Zuhab border.

The Ottoman–Persian War (1821–1823) ended with the signing of the First Treaty of Erzurum, which re-affirmed the 1639 Zuhab border. A boundary commission involving Iranian, Ottoman, Russian and British officials assisted with the boundary delimitation, resulting in the Second Treaty of Erzurum of 1847 which affirmed the 1639 border with some small modifications. The four-way boundary commission resumed its work in the following years, and after much work and cartographic disputation a detailed map was produced in 1869. Some small modification were made in the vicinity of Qatur as a result of the Treaty of Berlin (1878).

Despite the work of the commission, disputes concerning the precise boundary alignment continued. The Ottomans and Iran agreed to work on a more precise demarcation in 1911 at the urging of Russia and the Britain, both of whom had colonial aspirations in the region. From November 1913 to October 1914 a boundary commission established the Constantinople Protocol, providing a detailed delimitation of the entire boundary. The four-nation boundary commission then surveyed the border on the ground and demarcated it with pillars (excluding the Qatur area which remained in dispute), producing a detailed series of maps depicting the confirmed frontier.

=== Post–Ottoman era (1920–present) ===
During the First World War an Arab Revolt, supported by Britain, succeeded in removing the Ottomans from most of the Middle East. As a result of the secret 1916 Anglo-French Sykes–Picot Agreement Britain gained control of the Ottoman Vilayets of Mosul, Baghdad and Basra, which it organised into Mandatory Iraq in 1920.

By the 1920 Treaty of Sèvres, Anatolian Turkey was to be partitioned, with the areas north of the Mosul Vilayet to be included within an autonomous or independent Kurdish state. Turkish nationalists were outraged at the treaty, contributing to the outbreak of the Turkish War of Independence; the Turkish success in this conflict rendered Sèvres obsolete. By the 1923 Treaty of Lausanne, Turkey's independence was recognised and a far more generous territorial settlement was agreed upon, albeit at the cost of Turkey formally renouncing any claim to Arab lands. In the east the former Ottoman-Iran boundary was retained, now forming the borders between Iran and Iraq, and also Iran and the new Republic of Turkey.

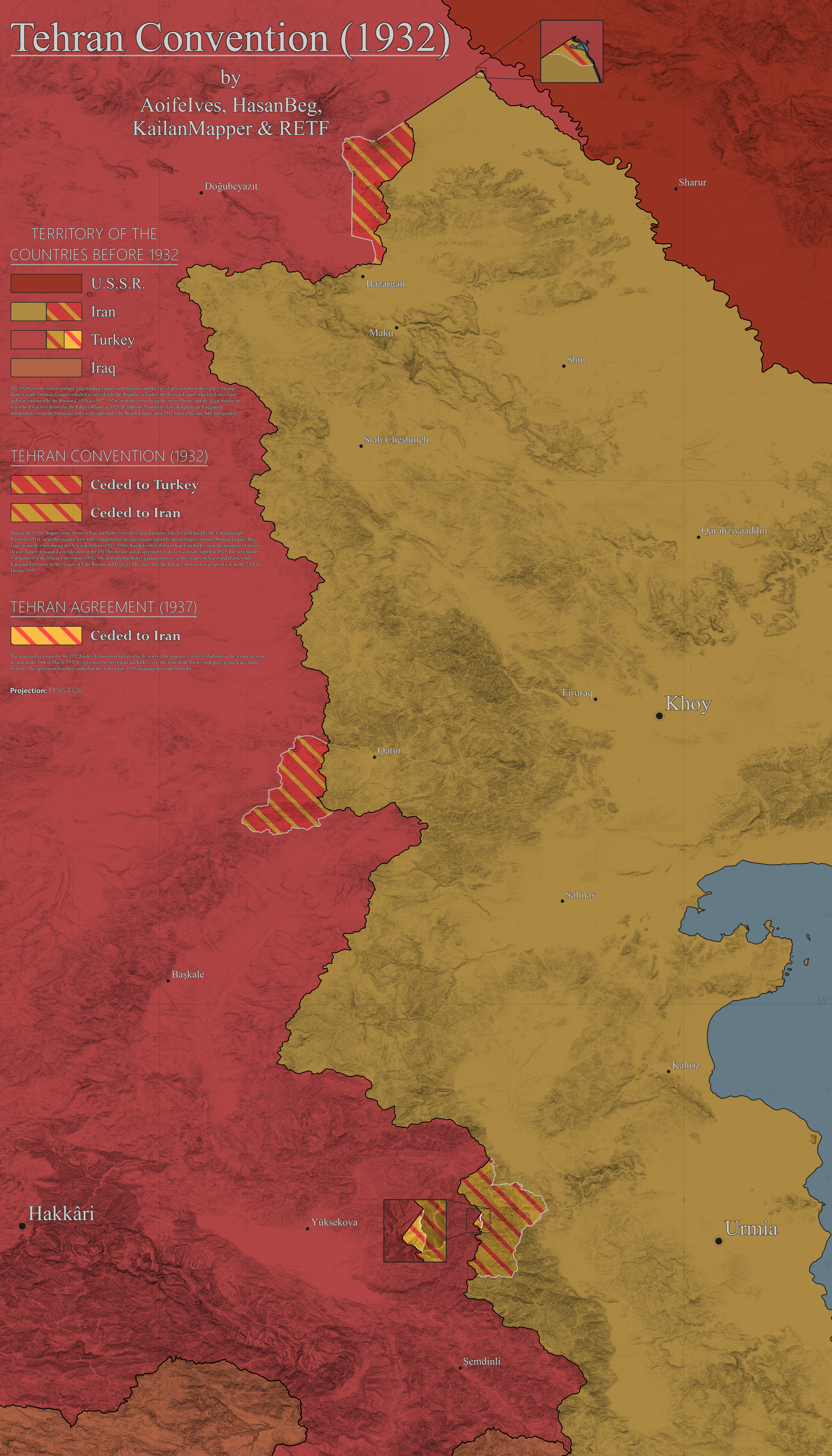
Tehran Convention (1932)

On 9 April 1929, a treaty was signed in Ankara between Turkey and Iran to further delimit their border, partly in response to the Kurdish Ararat rebellion; this was then finalised at the 1932 Tehran Convention, resulting in some small exchanges of territory in the vicinity of Little Ararat, Bazhergah and Qotur. The border was then demarcated and a final agreement signed in Tehran on 26 May 1937.

From 2017, Turkey began constructing a barrier along the Turkey-Iran border aimed at preventing illegal crossings and smuggling. The wall will cover 144 km (89 miles) of the border. As of December 2017, half of the border barrier had been finished. According to the responsible officials, the border barrier should have been completed by spring 2019. The national housing commission TOKİ is building the wall in the provinces of Iğdır and Ağrı.

== Settlements near the border ==
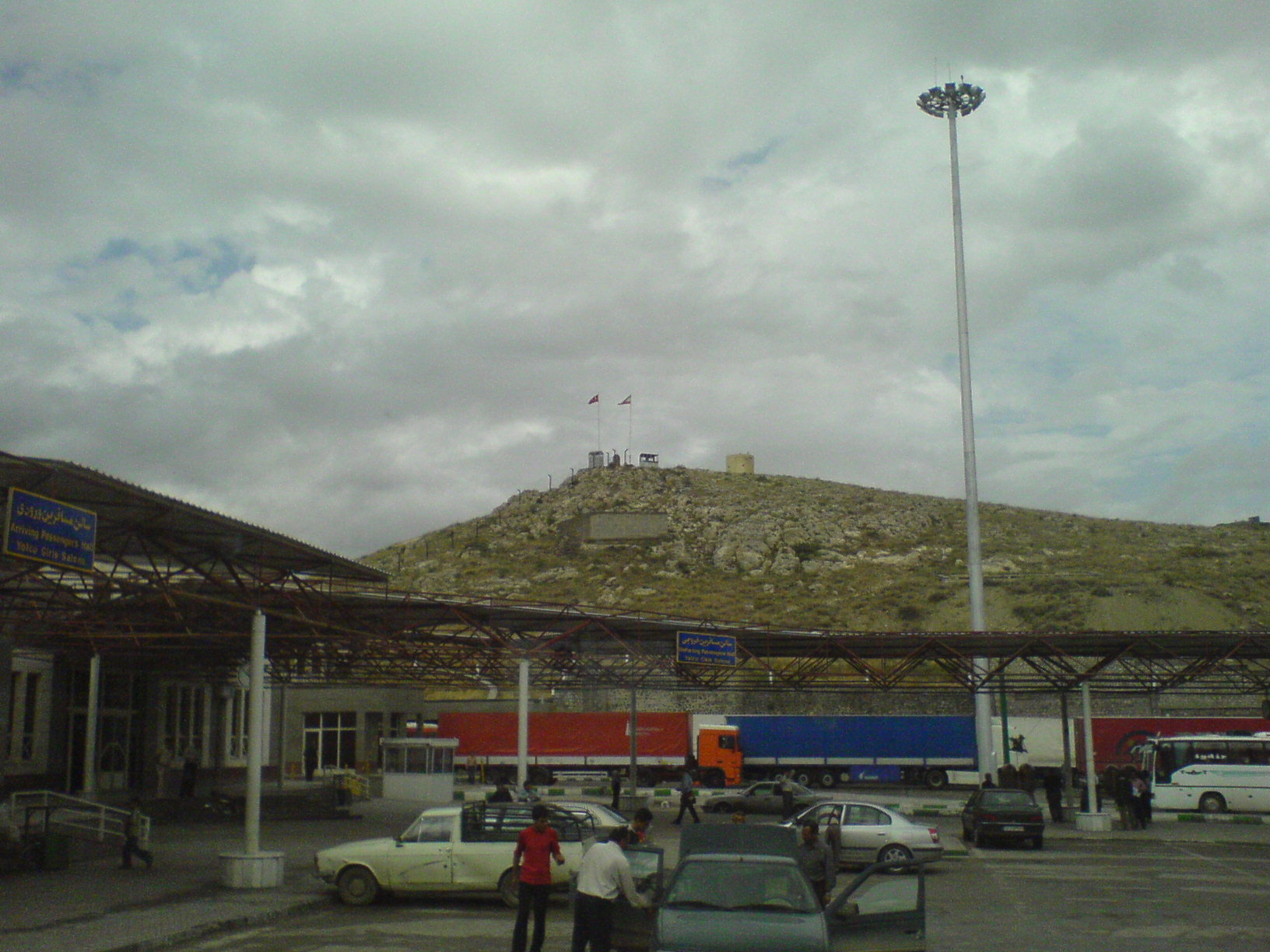
The border crossing at Bazargan

=== Iran ===
- Maku
- Qotur
- Seyah Cheshmeh
- Salmas
- Barduk

=== Turkey ===
- Doğubayazıt, Ağrı
- Kapıköy, Van
- Gürbulak, Ağrı
- Saray, Van
- Böğrüpek
- Atlılar
- Esendere, Hakkari
- Borualan, Iğdır

== Crossings ==
There are three crossings along the entire border, two for vehicular traffic and one for vehicular and rail traffic. The busiest of three, Gürbulak, is among the busiest border checkpoints in the world.

(Turkey) Turkish checkpoint	Province	(Iran) Iranian checkpoint	Province	Opened	Route in Turkey	Route in Iran	Status
Gürbulak	Ağrı	Bazargan	West Azerbaijan	4 September 1953			Open
Kapıköy	Van	Razi	West Azerbaijan	16 April 2011			Open
Esendere	Hakkâri	Serow	West Azerbaijan	15 September 1964			Open
Borualan	Iğdır	N/A	West Azerbaijan	1 January 1985			Closed

== Barrier ==
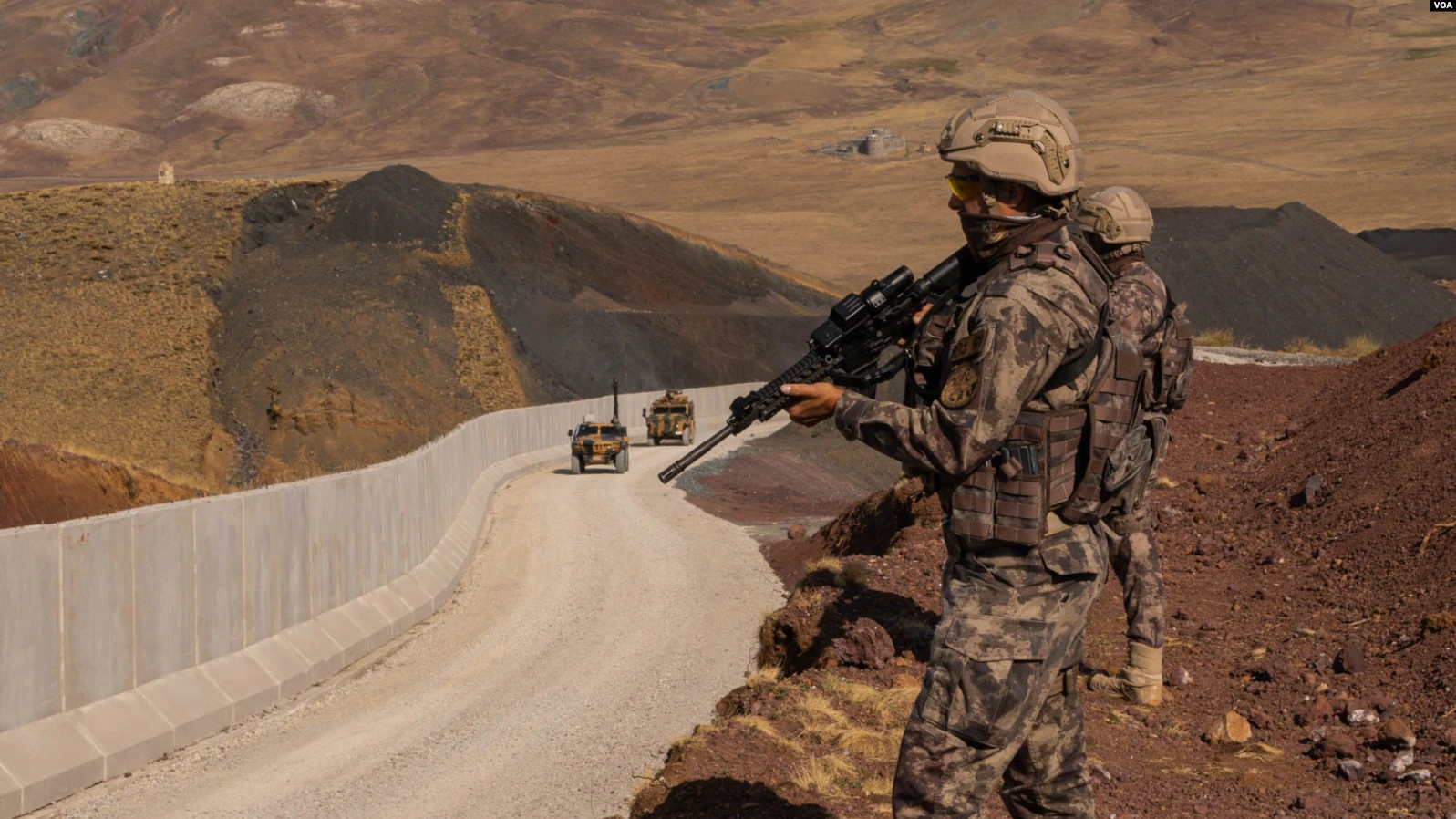
Iran-Turkey border barrier from the Turkish side

The Turkish government has expanded its plans to build a concrete wall along the Iranian border to cover the entirety of the frontier of 295 kilometres (183 miles), Van Governor Mehmet Emin Bilmez said on July 27, 2021.

The wall is 3 metres (9.8 feet) high, and patrols have been reinforced in the light of the 2021 Fall of Afghanistan to Taliban.

== Illegal crossings ==
With the 2021 fall of Afghanistan, a wave of refugees have been crossing Iran, then into Turkey. Both economic migrants looking for job opportunities and refugees fleeing Taliban violence or extorsions have been reported. Turkish border police have raised their efforts, violently massing those refugees at the border, pushing back into Iran, arresting them when they crossed, and deporting them without due process. Evidence of special efforts to prevent reporters from documenting this issue have been reported.

== See also ==
- Ark of Nuh or Noah
- Iran-Turkey relations
