= Mir Omar =

Village in West Azerbaijan province, Iran

Mir Omar Persian: ميرعمر
- Village
- Location within Iran
- Coordinates: 38°23′39″N 44°25′01″E
- Country: Iran
- Province: West Azerbaijan
- County: Khoy
- District: Qotur
- Rural District: Qotur

Population (2016)
  - Total: 1,257
- Time zone: UTC+3:30 (IRST)

Mir Omar (Persian: ميرعمر) (Note: Also romanized as Mīr ‘Omar) is a village in Qotur Rural District of Qotur District in Khoy County, West Azerbaijan province, Iran.

== Demographics ==
=== Population ===
At the time of the 2006 National Census, the village's population was 1,114 in 176 households. The following census in 2011 counted 1,421 people in 310 households. The 2016 census measured the population of the village as 1,257 people in 296 households.
