= Kargakonmaz =

- Village
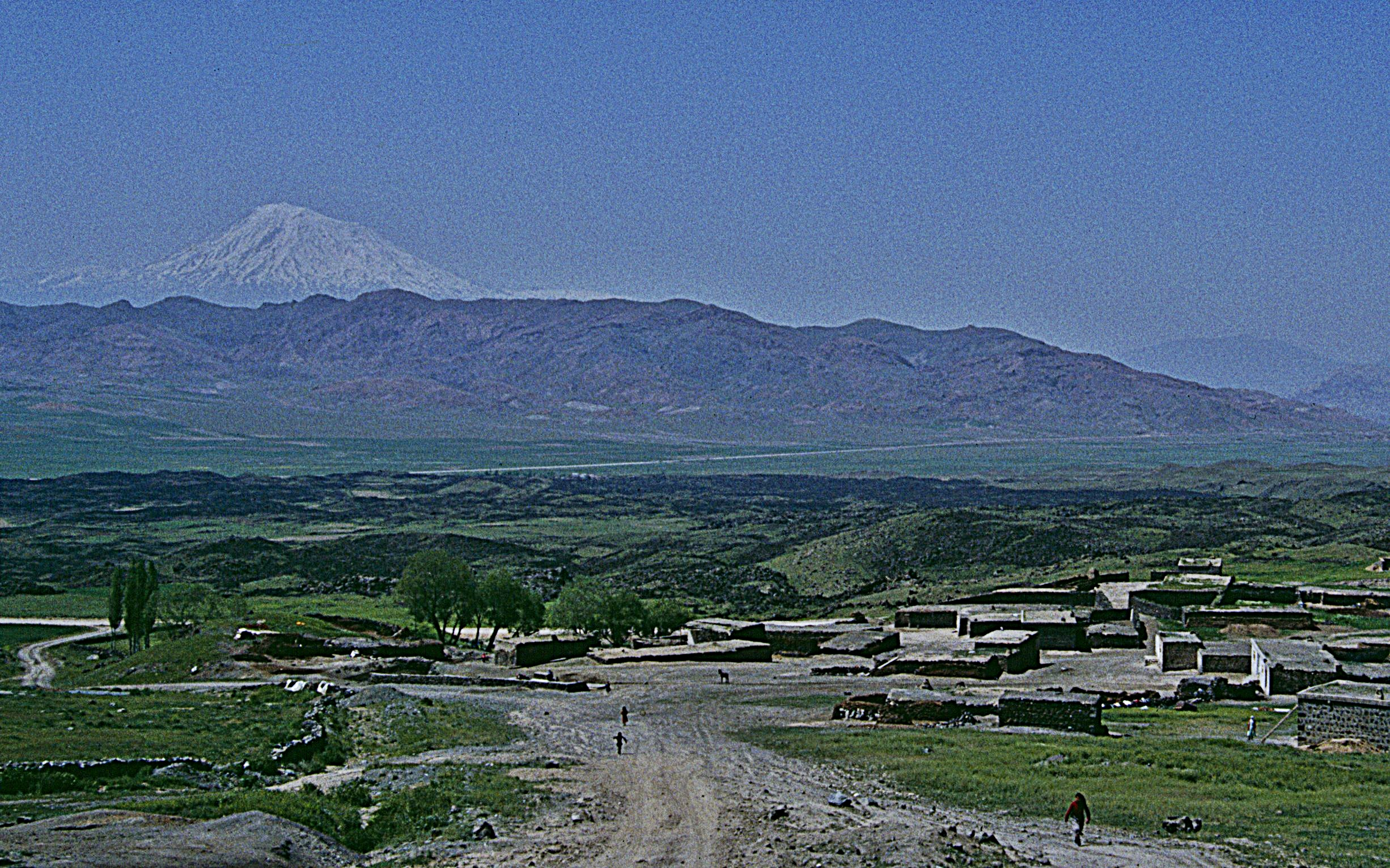
- Country near Kargakonmaz with Mount Ararat in the distance

- Location within Turkey
- Coordinates: 39°25′25″N 44°17′03″E
- Country: Turkey
- Province: Ağrı
- District: Doğubayazıt
- Population (2021): 211
- Time zone: UTC+3 (TRT)

Kargakonmaz is a village in Doğubayazıt District, Ağrı Province, Turkey. Its population is 211 (2021). It is located at 39° 30' 19"N, 44° 16' 29"E , about 128 km from Ağrı, and 31 km from the town of Dogubayazit. It is near the point where the Armenian, Iranian and Turkish borders intersect and is approximately 100 km south of Yerevan, the capital of Armenia. At 1,640 m above sea level, it enjoys a cold to temperate climate. The area enjoys significant rainfall throughout the year, averaging 336 mm per month.

The original name of the village was Qerequymez.

In the year 2000 the village's population was 392 and in 1997 it was 337. The village economy is based on agriculture and animal husbandry. The village primary school has been temporarily closed. The village has telephone and sealed road access and a potable drinking water supply, but no sewerage system and no post office. There are no health services.

Its proximity to Mount Ararat has led to various stories of the town's involvement in Noah's story.
