= Mount Zor =

Mountain in northeastern Turkey

- Location within Turkey

Highest point
- Elevation: 3.196 m (10.49 ft)
- Coordinates: 39°43′05″N 43°55′25″E

Geography
- Location: Doğubayazıt District, Ağrı Province, Turkey
- Parent range: Aras Mountains

Mount Zor (Turkish: Zor Dağı) is a mountain in northeastern Turkey. It is located to the west of Mount Ararat.

== Geology and geomorphology ==
Mount Zor forms the eastern extensions of the Aras Mountains.
