= Doğubayazıt District =

District of Ağrı Province, Turkey

- District
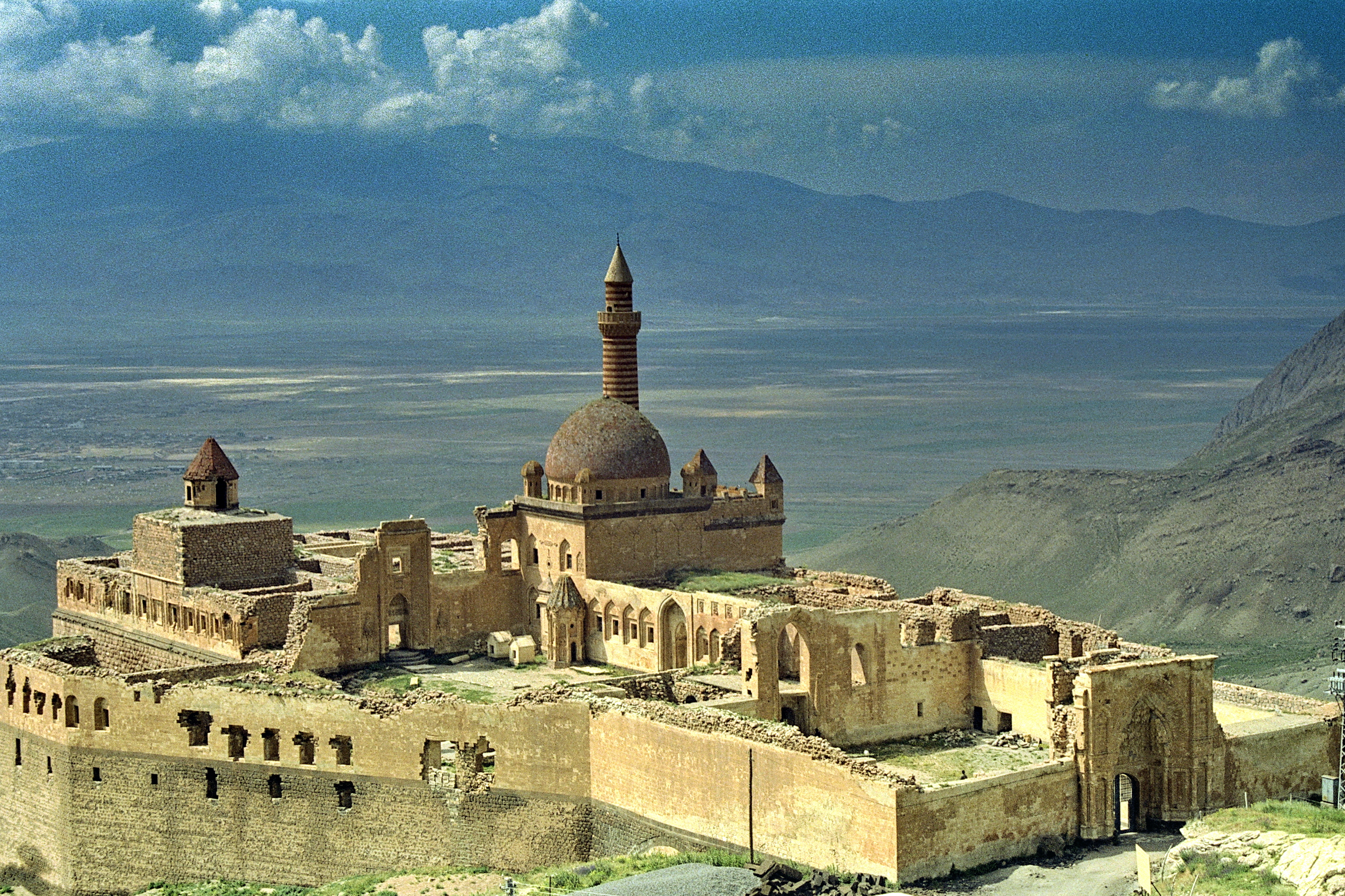
- Ishak Pasha Palace, Doğubayazıt

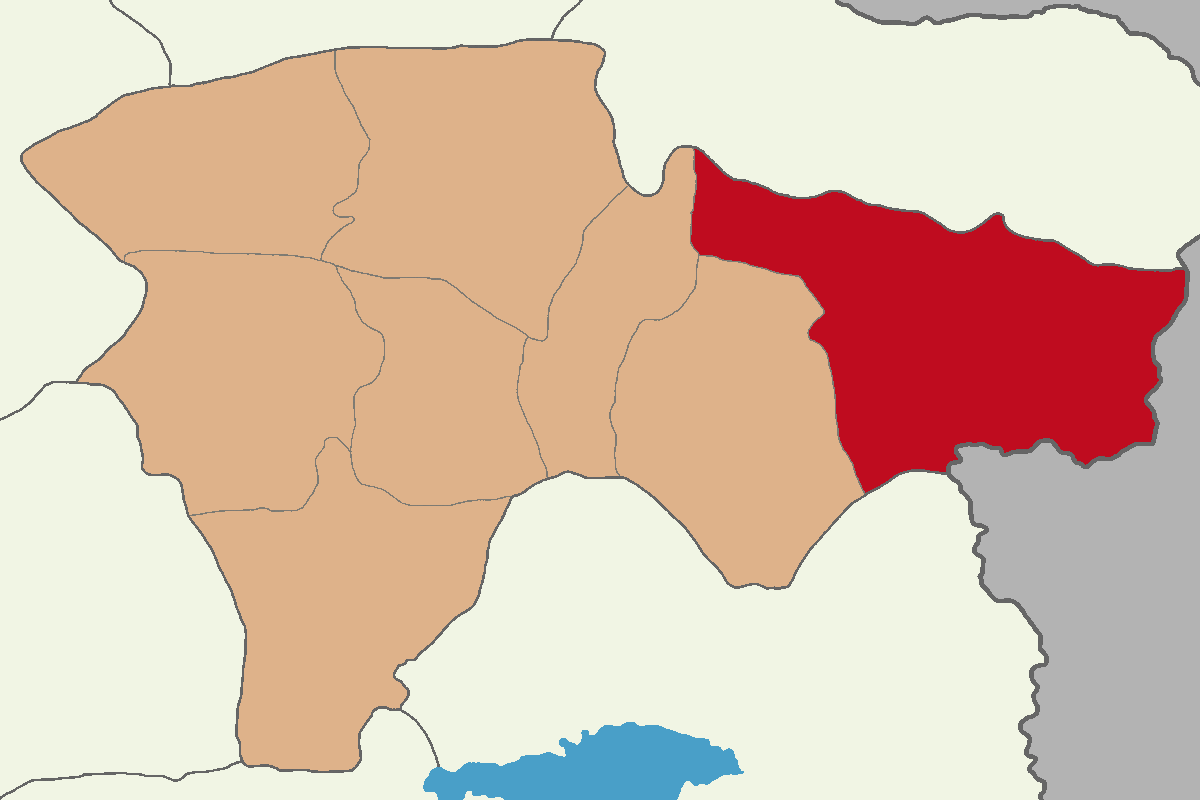
- Map showing Doğubayazıt District in Ağrı Province

- Location within Turkey
- Coordinates: 39°33′N 44°05′E
- Country: Turkey
- Province: Ağrı
- Seat: Doğubayazıt

Government
  - Kaymakam: Murat Ekinci
- Area: 2,250 km^{2} (870 sq mi)
- Population (2021): 118,643
  - Density: 52.7/km^{2} (137/sq mi)
- Time zone: UTC+3 (TRT)
- Website: www.dogubayazit.gov.tr

Doğubayazıt District is a district of Ağrı Province in Turkey. Its seat is the town Doğubayazıt. It is the easternmost district of Turkey, lying near the border with Iran. Its area is 2,250 km^{2}, and its population is 118,643 (2021). The current Kaymakam is Murat Ekinci.

== Composition ==
There is one municipality in Doğubayazıt District:

- Doğubayazıt

There are 85 villages in Doğubayazıt District:

- Aktarla
- Aktuğlu
- Alıntepe
- Aşağıtavla
- Atabakan
- Ayrancı
- Bardaklı
- Barındı
- Başköy
- Bereket
- Besler
- Bezirhane
- Binkaya
- Bozkurt
- Bozyayla
- Bölücek
- Bulakbaşı
- Buyuretti
- Çalıköy
- Çetenli
- Çiftlikköy
- Çömçeli
- Dağdelen
- Dalbahçe
- Demirtepe
- Dolaklı
- Dostali
- Eskisu
- Esnemez
- Gökçekaynak
- Göller
- Gölyüzü
- Gözükara
- Güllüce
- Gültepe
- Güngören
- Günyolu
- Gürbulak
- Hallaç
- Incesu
- Kalecik
- Karabulak
- Karaburun
- Karaca
- Karakent
- Karaseyh
- Kargakonmaz
- Kazan
- Kızılkaya
- Kucak
- Kutlubulak
- Melikşah
- Mescitköy
- Ortadirek
- Ortaköy
- Örmeli
- Örtülü
- Pullutarla
- Sağdıç
- Sağlıksuyu
- Sarıbıyık
- Sarıçavuş
- Sazoba
- Seslitaş
- Somkaya
- Subeşiği
- Suluçem
- Tanıktepe
- Telçeker
- Topçatan
- Tulumlu
- Tutak
- Uzunyazı
- Üçgöze
- Üçmurat
- Üzengili
- Yağmurdüşen
- Yalınsaz
- Yanoba
- Yaygınyurt
- Yeniharman
- Yığınçal
- Yılanlı
- Yiğityatağı
- Yukarıtavla
