= Aras Mountains =

Mountain range in northeastern Turkey

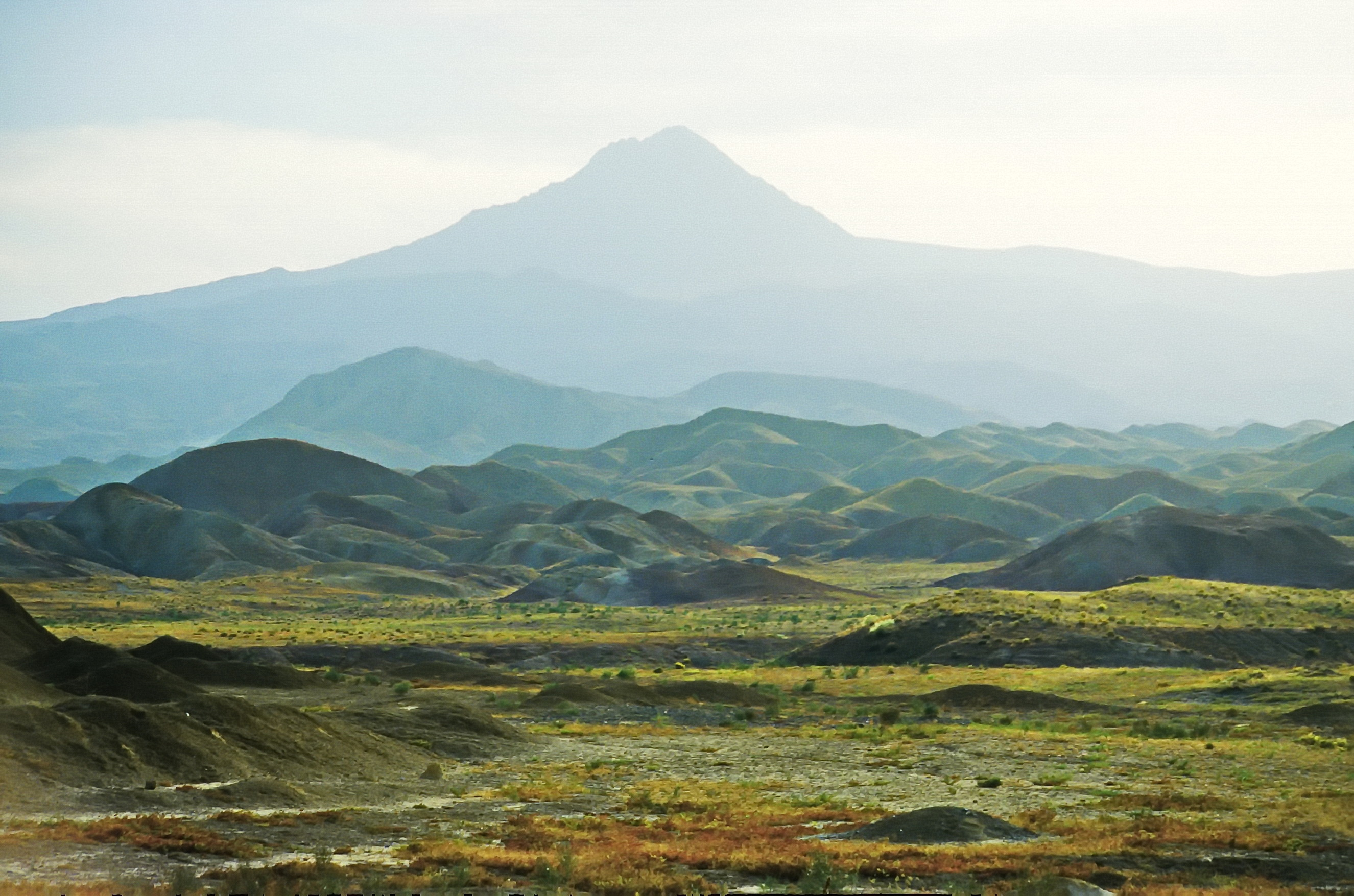
- One of the highest points in the Aras mountains; Mount Aşağı.

Highest point
- Elevation: 3,275 m (10,745 ft)
- Prominence: 3,196 m (10,486 ft)
- Coordinates: 40°01′34″N 43°12′01″E

Geography
- Location within Turkey
- Location: Erzurum Province, Kars Province, Ağrı Province, Iğdır Province, Turkey

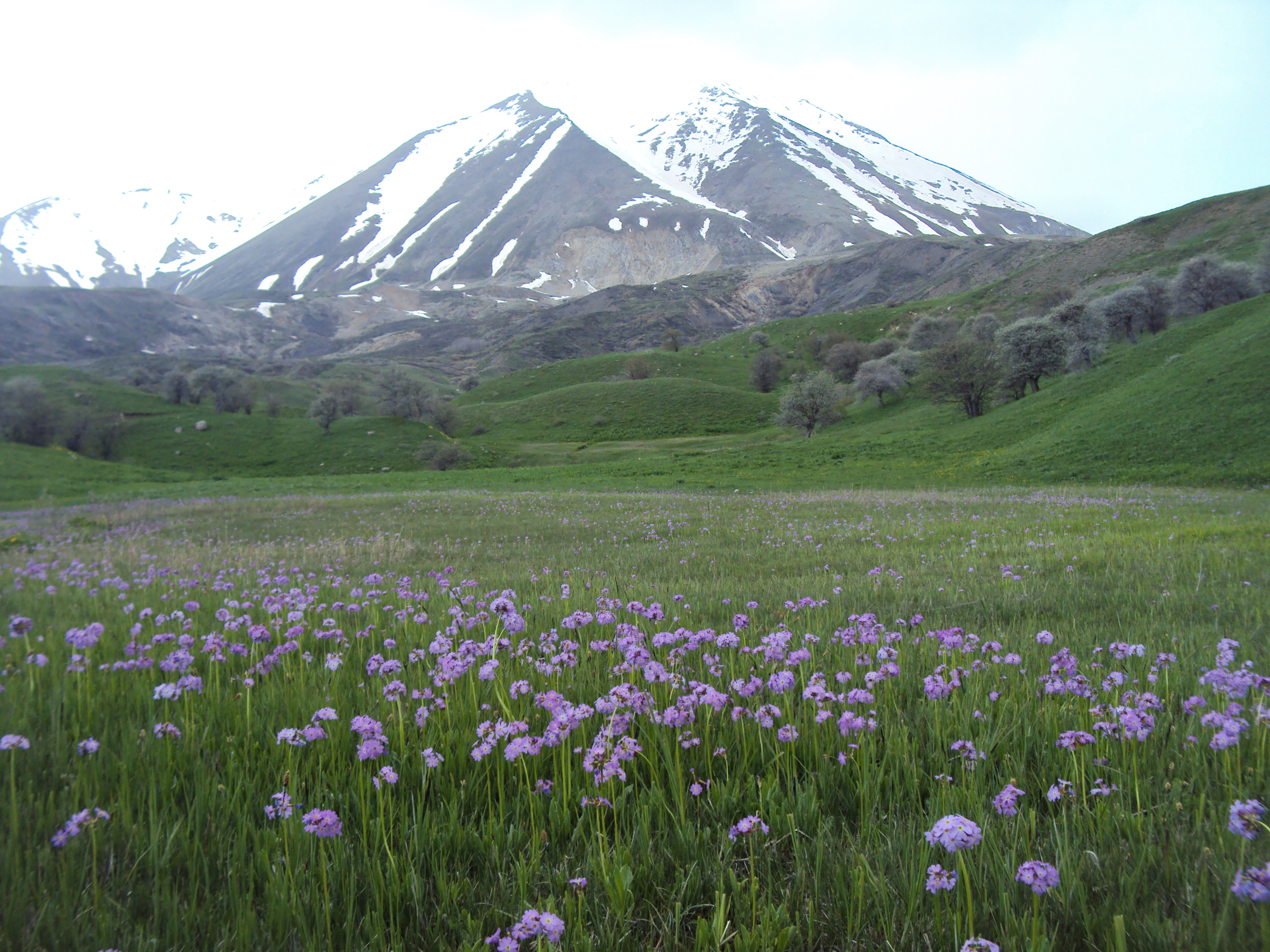
Haykakan Par

Aras Mountains (Turkish: Aras Dağları), is a mountain range in northeastern Turkey. Also known as Haykakan Par (Armenian: Հայկական Պար). It is located on the border of Erzurum, Kars, Ağrı and Iğdır provinces. It is a ridge at the middle of the Armenian highlands. It starts near sources of the Araxes river and stretches from the south bank as far west as Mount Ararat. The length of the ridge 200 km, the height - up to 3445 m. It was formed by a chain of volcanoes that arose along a major tectonic fault. The ridge is part of the watershed between the basins of the Caspian Sea and the Persian Gulf.

== History ==
The Aras Mountains formed the borders of the Kingdom of Erikua and Urartu in ancient times. The crossings above it, on the other hand, have been the most important defense points where the borders of the two countries are protected.

Due to the Armenian genocide, the ethnic composition of the region has changed radically over the last 150 years. In the 1920s, the newly-founded Turkish Republic started the Turkification of all Armenian toponyms remaining in the eastern half of present-day Turkey.

== Geology and geomorphology ==
The Aras Mountains start from the Erzurum border, pass the Ağrı and Kars borders, and end in the west of Mount Ararat. This mountain range, extending from west to east, divides the geography it passes through into two in the north-south direction. The most important elevations of the mountains are Zor and Pamuk mountains. Doğubayazıt district center is located in the south of the Karasu-Aras Mountains, Iğdır is in the north. Lake Balık is located in the Aras Mountains. Doğubayazıt Reeds are located to the east of Zor Dağ, which is part of the Aras Mountains.
