= Gözükara, Doğubayazıt =

Gözükara
- Village
- Location in Turkey
- Coordinates: 39°27′45″N 44°06′41″E
- Country: Turkey
- Province: Ağrı
- District: Doğubayazıt
- Elevation: 2,166 m (7,106 ft)
- Population (2023): 328
- Time zone: UTC+3 (TRT)
- Postal code: 04402
- Area code: 0472

Gözükara is a village in the Doğubayazıt District of Ağrı Province, Turkey.

== History ==
The village's former name was recorded as Karagöz in 1901. The village has been known by its current name since 1928.

== Geography ==
The village is located 123 km from the provincial capital of Ağrı and 26 km from the district center of Doğubayazıt.

== Population ==
Historical population
Year	Pop.	±% p.a.
1965	310	—
1985	485	+2.26%
1990	501	+0.65%
1997	445	−1.68%
2007	500	+1.17%
2012	492	−0.32%
2017	400	−4.06%
2023	328	−3.25%
Source: Population censuses (1965-1997) and TÜİK (2007-2023)
