= State road D.400 (Turkey) =

Road in Turkey

D.400

Route information
- Part of E90
- Length: 2,057 km (1,278 mi)

Major junctions
- West end: Datça
- East end: Road 16 at Serow, West Azarbaijan

Location
- Country: Turkey

Highway system
- Highways in Turkey; Motorways; List; State Highways; List

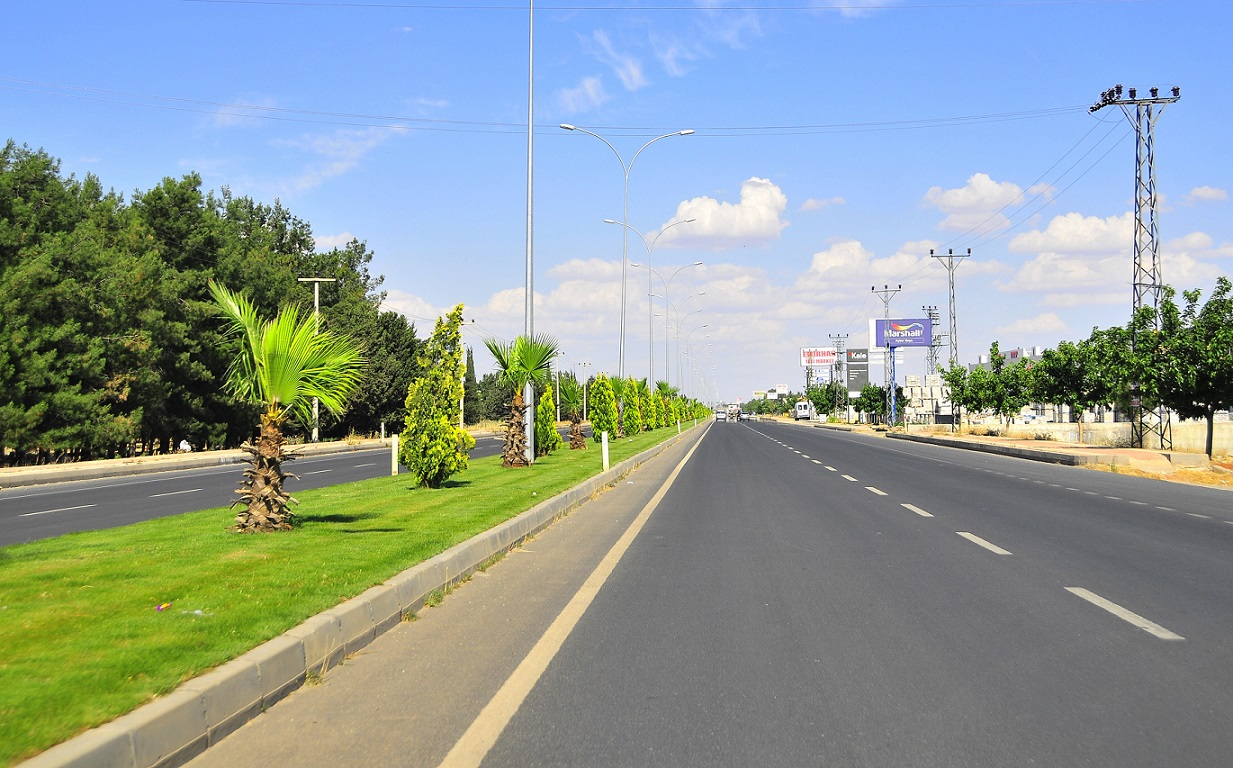
State road D400 near Şanlıurfa

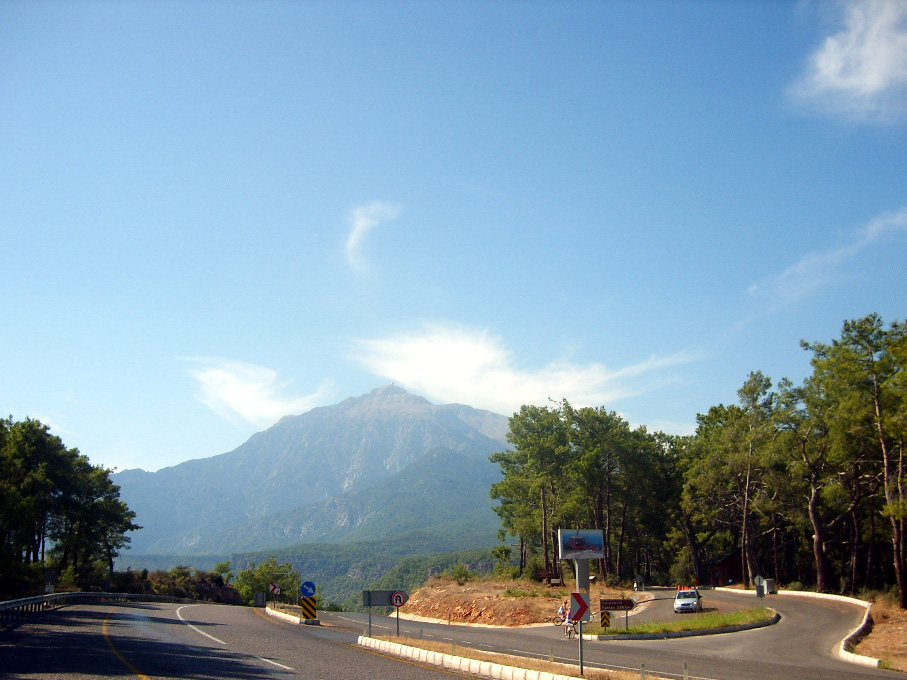
Between Kumluca and Kemer (Antalya Province)

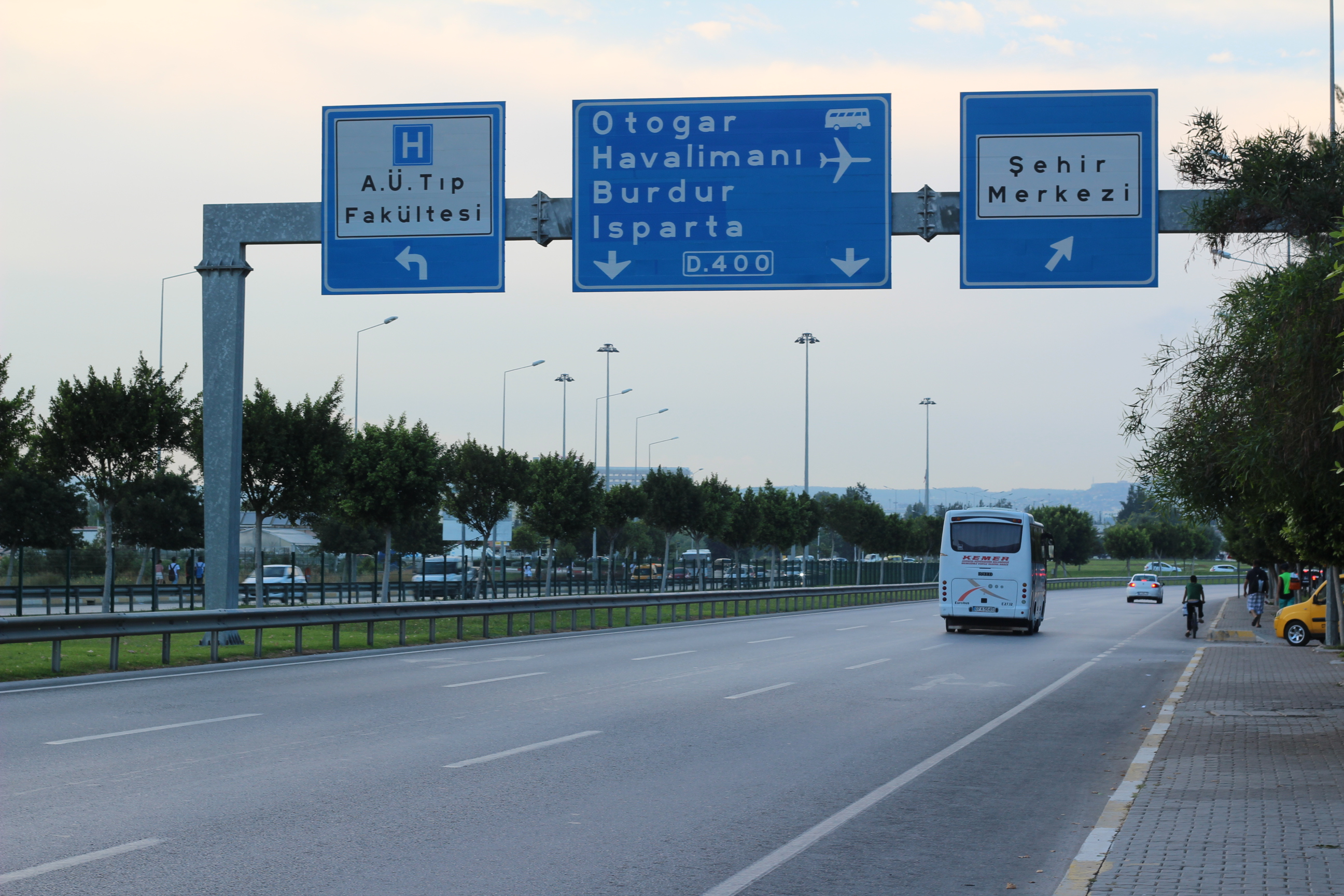
In Antalya as Dumlupınar Bulvarı

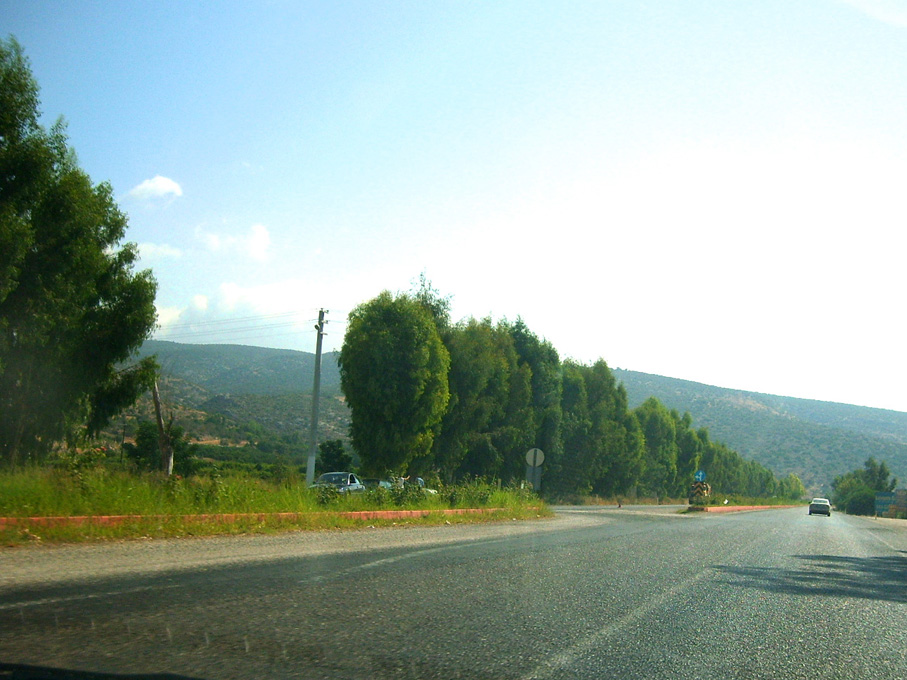
Between Yeşilovacık and Silifke (Mersin Province)

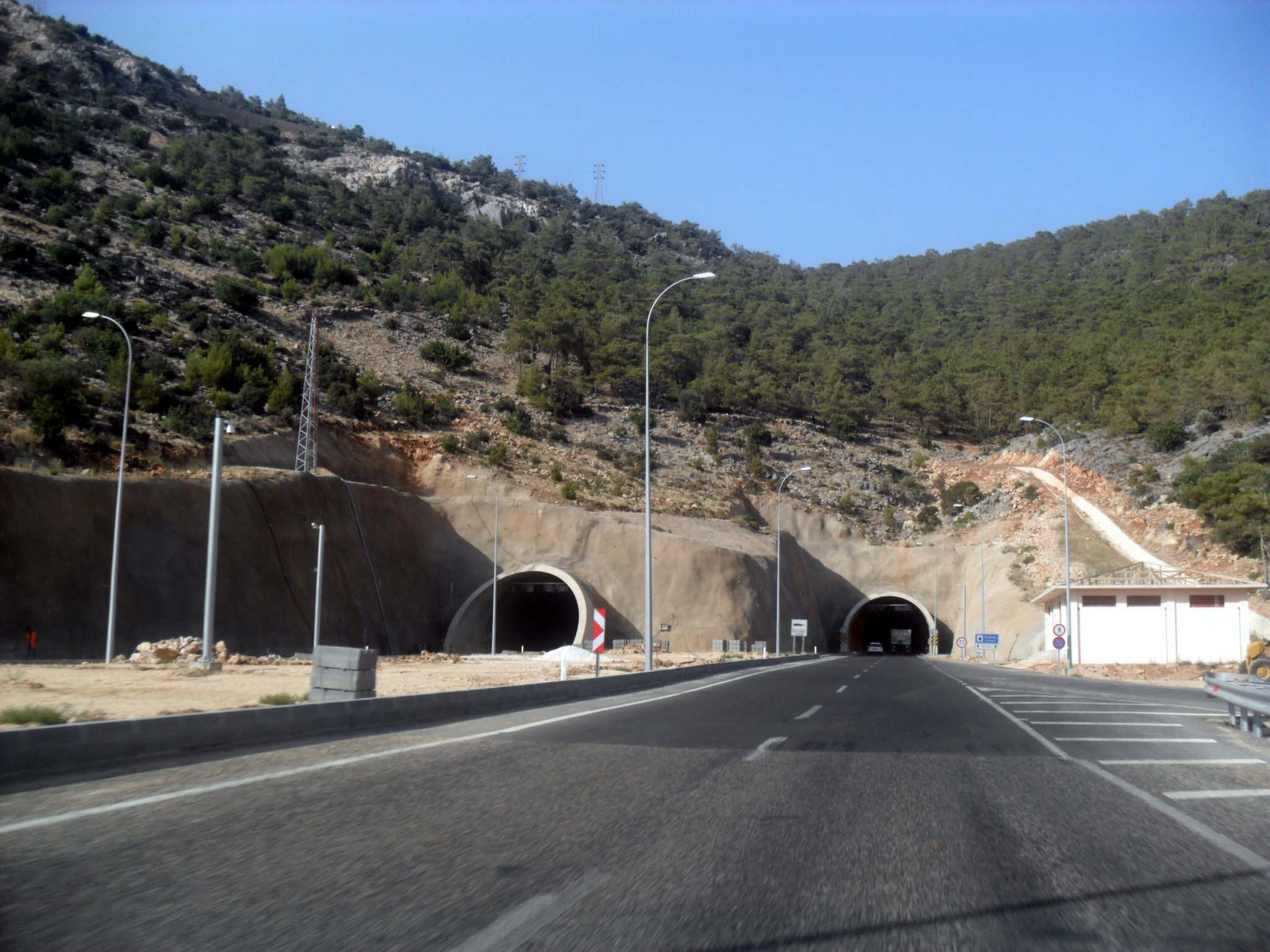
Boğsak Tunnel (Mersin Province)

D.400 is an east–west state road in southern Turkey. The 2,057-kilometre (1,278 mi) road starts at Datça in the southwest corner of the Anatolian peninsula and ends at the Iranian border at Esendere.

D.400 runs through the cities of Marmaris, Fethiye, Antalya, Alanya, Mersin, Adana, Gaziantep, Şanlıurfa, and Hakkâri and links to Road 16 in Iran. Between Nizip and Cizre, D.400 is part of the European route E90.

== Itinerary ==
The table below shows the locations between Datça and Esendere.

Province	City	Distance from previous location	Distance from Datça	Distance from Esendere
Muğla	Datça	0	0	2,057
Muğla	Bozburun	51	51	2,006
Muğla	Marmaris	18	69	1,988
Muğla	Muğla	27	96	1,961
Muğla	Köyceğiz	33	129	1,928
Muğla	Ortaca	18	147	1,910
Muğla	Dalaman	5	152	1,905
Muğla	Fethiye	43	195	1,862
Muğla	Eşen	44	239	1,818
Antalya	Kalkan	36	275	1,782
Antalya	Kaş	26	301	1,756
Antalya	Demre	47	348	1,609
Antalya	Finike	28	376	1,681
Antalya	Kumluca	18	394	1,663
Antalya	Kemer	52	446	1,611
Antalya	Antalya	42	488	1,569
Antalya	Serik	42	530	1,527
Antalya	Manavgat	36	566	1,491
Antalya	Alanya	60	626	1,431
Antalya	Gazipaşa	44	670	1,387
Mersin	Kaledran	39	709	1,348
Mersin	Anamur	45	754	1,303
Mersin	Bozyazı	14	768	1,289
Mersin	Aydıncık	39	807	1,150
Mersin	Yeşilovacık	44	851	1,206
Mersin	Silifke	42	893	1,164
Mersin	Erdemli	46	939	1,118
Mersin	Mersin	38	977	1,080
Mersin	Tarsus	28	1,005	1,053
Adana
Adana	Adana	42	1,047	1,010
Adana	Misis	21	1,068	989
Adana	Ceyhan	24	1,092	965
Osmaniye
Osmaniye	Osmaniye	51	1,143	914
Osmaniye	Bahçe	30	1,173	884
Gaziantep
Gaziantep	Nurdağı	21	1,194	853
Gaziantep	Gaziantep	62	1,256	801
Gaziantep	Nizip	45	1,301	756
Şanlıurfa
Şanlıurfa	Birecik	16	1,317	740
Şanlıurfa	Şanlıurfa	80	1,397	660
Şanlıurfa	Viranşehir	91	1,488	569
Mardin
Mardin	Kızıltepe	73	1,561	496
Mardin	Nusaybin	56	1,617	440
Şırnak
Şırnak	Cizre	100	1,717	340
Şırnak	Şırnak	46	1,763	294
Hakkari
Hakkari	Hakkâri	183	1,946	111
Hakkari	Yüksekova	70	2,016	41
Hakkari	Esendere (Iranian border)	41	2,057	0
1.000 mi = 1.609 km; 1.000 km = 0.621 mi

== Intersections ==
- D.550 at Gökova
- D.555 near Dalaman
- D.350 near Fethiye
- D.635 near Finike
- D.650 at Antalya
- D.685 near Antalya Airport
- D.687 at Bereket, Antalya Province
- D.695 near Kızılağaç, Antalya Province
- D.715 at Silifke
- O-51 near Erdemli
- D.815 at Adana
- O-52 at Çakaldere, Adana Province
- D.817 at Ceyhan
- O-52 near Tüysüz, Osmaniye Province
- D.817 near Tüysüz, Osmaniye Province
- D.825 at Nurdağı
- D.835 near Gaziantep
- O-54 at Gaziantep
- O-52 at Gaziantep
- P.27-26 at Nizip
- D.885 at Şanlıurfa
- D.905 at Viranşehir
- D.950 at Kızıltepe
- D.430 at Cizre
- D.370 at Şırnak
- D.975 near Bağışlı, Hakkari Province
- Road 16 at Serow, West Azarbaijan
