= Serow, Iran =

City in West Azerbaijan province, Iran

Serow Persian: سرو
- City
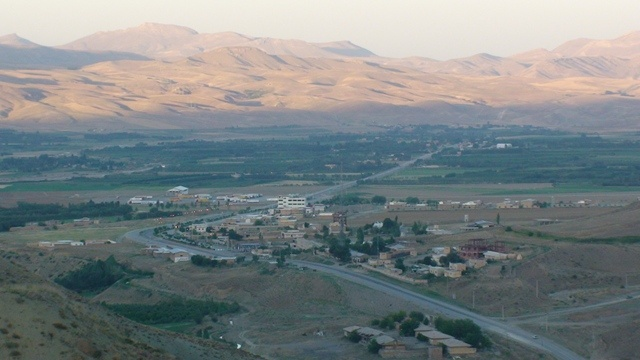

- Location within Iran
- Coordinates: 37°43′38″N 44°38′33″E
- Country: Iran
- Province: West Azerbaijan
- County: Urmia
- District: Sumay-ye Beradust
- Established as a city: 2000

Population (2016)
  - Total: 1,800
- Time zone: UTC+3:30 (IRST)

Serow (Persian: سرو) (Note: Also known as Sero and Sīroo; Kurdish: سێرۆ) is a city in, and the capital of, Sumay-ye Beradust District in Urmia County, West Azerbaijan province, Iran. The village of Serow merged with the villages of Bahik (بهیک), Kurabad (کورآباد), and Nujavan (نوجوان) to become the new city of Serow in 2000.

== Demographics ==
=== Language and ethnicity ===
Serow is populated by two distinct communities. The first are the Kurds who speak Kurmanji Kurdish and follow Sunni Islam. The second are the Azerbaijanis who speak Azeri Turkish and follow Shia Islam.

=== Population ===
At the time of the 2006 National Census, the city's population was 1,508 in 279 households. The following census in 2011 counted 1,530 people in 331 households. The 2016 census measured the population of the city as 1,800 people in 469 households.

== Geography ==
Situated on the border with Turkey, it has a border crossing linking it with the Turkish town of Esendere.
