= Barduk =

beyduh بیدوک
- Village
- Location within Iran
- Coordinates: 37°50′04″N 44°33′53″E
- Country: Iran
- Province: West Azerbaijan
- County: Urmia
- Bakhsh: Sumay-ye Beradust
- Rural District: Sumay-ye Jonubi

Population (2006)
  - Total: 368
- Time zone: UTC+3:30 (IRST)
  - Summer (DST): UTC+4:30 (IRDT)

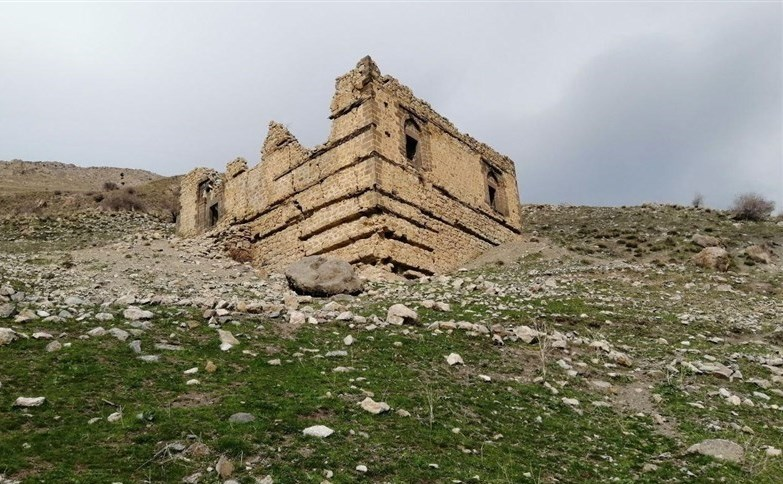
Barduk Castle in 2020

Beyduh (Persian: بیدوک, also Romanized as Beyduh, Beydook, and Bayduk; in Armenian: Բերդուկ) is a village in Sumay-ye Jonubi Rural District, Sumay-ye Beradust District, Urmia County, West Azerbaijan Province, Iran. At the 2006 census, its population was 368, in 64 families. It lies near the Iran–Turkey border.
