= Ravyan =

Village in West Azerbaijan province, Iran

Ravyan Persian: راويان
- Village
- Location within Iran
- Coordinates: 38°23′07″N 44°30′18″E
- Country: Iran
- Province: West Azerbaijan
- County: Khoy
- District: Qotur
- Rural District: Zeri

Population (2016)
  - Total: 938
- Time zone: UTC+3:30 (IRST)

Ravyan (Persian: راويان) (Note: Also romanized as Rāvīyān and Rāvyān; also known as Rūyān) is a village in Zeri Rural District of Qotur District in Khoy County, West Azerbaijan province, Iran.

== Demographics ==
=== Population ===
At the time of the 2006 National Census, the village's population was 1,375 in 251 households. The following census in 2011 counted 1,211 people in 251 households. The 2016 census measured the population of the village as 938 people in 230 households.
