= Zeri, Iran =

Village in West Azerbaijan province, Iran

Zeri Persian: زري
- Village
- Location within Iran
- Coordinates: 38°26′52″N 44°33′22″E
- Country: Iran
- Province: West Azerbaijan
- County: Khoy
- District: Qotur
- Rural District: Zeri

Population (2016)
  - Total: 1,611
- Time zone: UTC+3:30 (IRST)

Zeri (Persian: زري) (Note: Also romanized as Zerī) is a village in, and the capital of, Zeri Rural District in Qotur District of Khoy County, West Azerbaijan province, Iran.

== Demographics ==
=== Population ===
At the time of the 2006 National Census, the village's population was 1,598 in 293 households. The following census in 2011 counted 1,779 people in 375 households. The 2016 census measured the population of the village as 1,611 people in 366 households.
