= Qotur =

City in West Azerbaijan province, Iran

Qotur Persian: قطور Kurdish: کۆتۆلێ
- City
- Location within Iran
- Coordinates: 38°28′15″N 44°24′27″E
- Country: Iran
- Province: West Azerbaijan
- County: Khoy
- District: Qotur
- Established as a city: 2007

Population (2016)
  - Total: 5,147
- Time zone: UTC+3:30 (IRST)

Qotur (Persian: قطور (Note: Also romanized as Qaţūr, Qotur, and Qoţūr; also known as Ghatoor, Kotur, Kutur, and Qutur; Armenian: Կոտոր or Ղոթուր)) is a city in, and the capital of, Qotur District in Khoy County, West Azerbaijan province, Iran. It also serves as the administrative center for Qotur Rural District.

== Etymology ==
The city's name is said to originate from a disease very common in dogs and goats in Turkish language (qotur), and the warm water springs in this area helped to treat the disease and alleviate its symptoms.

== History ==
Following the Treaty of Berlin in 1878, Qotur was handed over from the Ottoman Empire to Iran.

== Demographics ==
=== Language and ethnicity ===
Qotur is adjacent to the Iran–Turkey border and is populated by Kurds of the Shakak tribe.

=== Population ===
At the time of the 2006 National Census, Qotur's population was 3,962 in 652 households, when it was a village in Qotur Rural District. The following census in 2011 counted 4,663 people in 1,000 households, by which time the village had been converted to a city. The 2016 census measured the population of the city as 5,147 people in 1,193 households.

== Climate ==
Due to its elevation at 1,961 m (6,433 ft) above sea level, Qotur has a cold continental mediterranean climate (Köppen: Dsb). Winters are cold and snowy while summers are warm and far dryer. The average annual temperature in Qotur is 6.9 °C (44.4 °F). Precipitation here is about 414mm (16.3 in) per year.
