= Çetenli, Doğubayazıt =

Çetenli
- Village
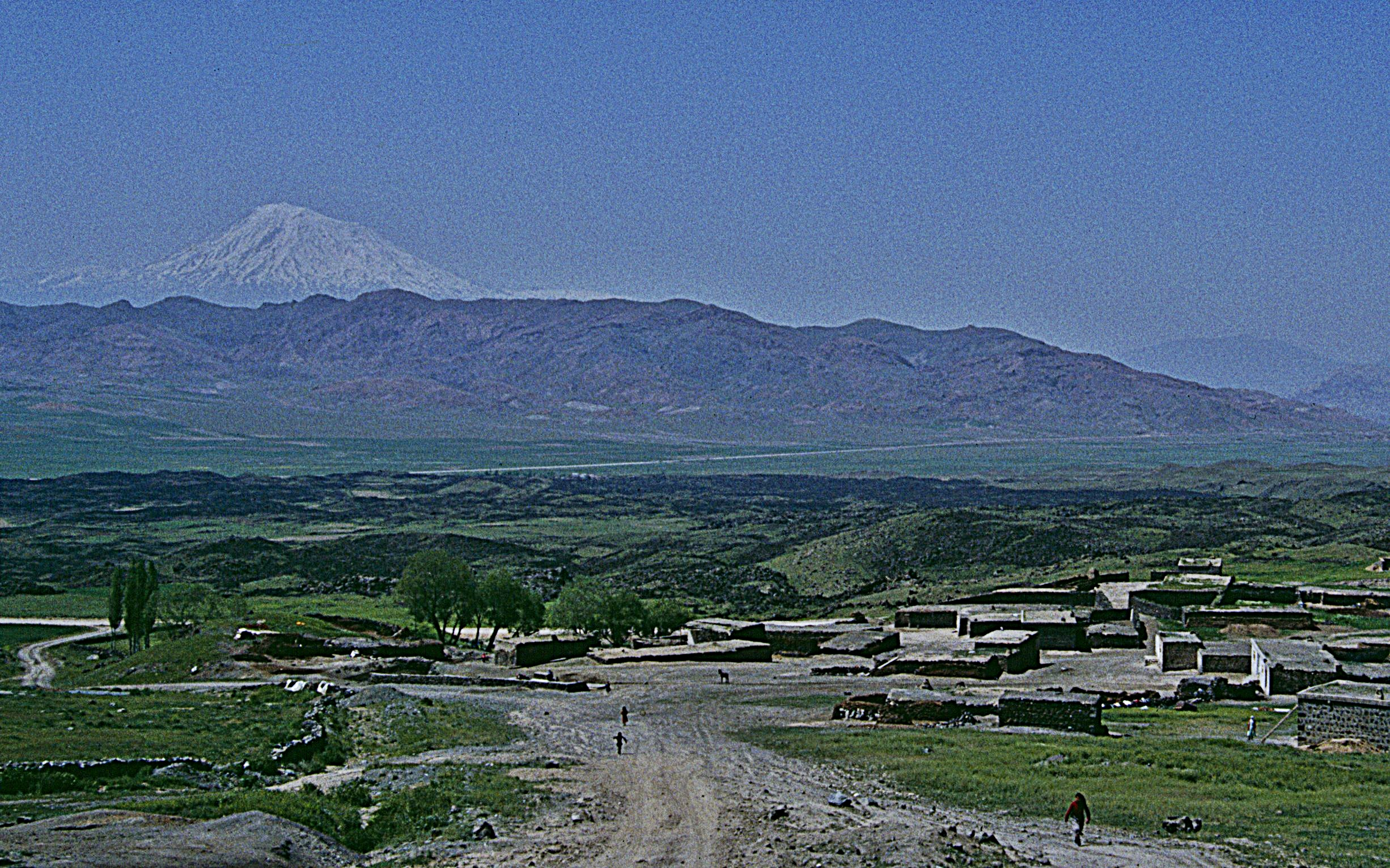
- Çetenli with Mount Ararat in the distance

- Location within Turkey
- Coordinates: 39°26′24″N 44°01′18″E
- Country: Turkey
- Province: Ağrı
- District: Doğubayazıt
- Population (2021): 867
- Time zone: UTC+3 (TRT)
- Postal code: 04400

Çetenli is a village in Doğubayazıt District, Ağrı Province, Turkey. Its population is 867 (2021).

The name of the village comes from the çeten plant, of which the village has a large number of fields. Located in Agri Province, the town is located 18 km from the town of Dogubayazit, and is in the shadow of the biblical Mount Ararat. The climate is mountainous and cold to temperate.

The village population has fluctuated greatly. In 2007 it was 3000 while in 2000, it was 1076 and in 1997, 1674. The village economy is based on agriculture and animal husbandry and has a school, medical center and a potable drinking water supply, but there is no sewerage nor post office. The village has asphalt roads connecting it, electricity and landline telephone.
