= Zeri Rural District =

Rural district in West Azerbaijan province, Iran

Zeri Rural District Persian: دهستان زرئ
- Rural District
- Location within Iran
- Coordinates: 38°27′N 44°35′E
- Country: Iran
- Province: West Azerbaijan
- County: Khoy
- District: Qotur
- Established: 1997
- Capital: Zeri

Population (2016)
  - Total: 8,339
- Time zone: UTC+3:30 (IRST)

Zeri Rural District (Persian: دهستان زرئ) is in Qotur District of Khoy County, West Azerbaijan province, Iran. Its capital is the village of Zeri.

== Demographics ==
=== Population ===
At the time of the 2006 National Census, the rural district's population was 9,513 in 1,729 households. There were 9,472 inhabitants in 2,047 households at the following census of 2011. The 2016 census measured the population of the rural district as 8,339 in 2,000 households. The most populous of its 12 villages was Gugerd, with 1,989 people.

=== Other villages in the rural district ===
- Al Sormeh
- Almalu
- Chalyan
- Kafacherin
- Qareh Gol
- Qilehliq
- Ravyan
- Salehabad
- Tarimish
