= Bazhergah =

Village in West Azerbaijan Province, Iran

Bazhergah باژرگه
- Village
- Location within Iran
- Coordinates: 38°01′04″N 44°47′03″E
- Country: Iran
- Province: West Azerbaijan
- County: Urmia
- Bakhsh: Sumay-ye Beradust
- Rural District: Sumay-ye Shomali

Population (2006)
  - Total: 115
- Time zone: UTC+3:30 (IRST)
  - Summer (DST): UTC+4:30 (IRDT)

Bazhergah (Persian: باژرگه, also Romanized as Bāzhergah; also known as Bājergeh) is a village in Sumay-ye Shomali Rural District, Sumay-ye Beradust District, Urmia County, West Azerbaijan Province, Iran. At the 2006 census, its population was 115, in 16 families.
