= Esendere, Yüksekova =

Municipality in Hakkâri Province, Turkey

Esendere
- Municipality
- Location in Turkey
- Coordinates: 37.715°N 44.602°E
- Country: Turkey
- Province: Hakkâri
- District: Yüksekova
- Population (2023): 4,497
- Time zone: UTC+3 (TRT)

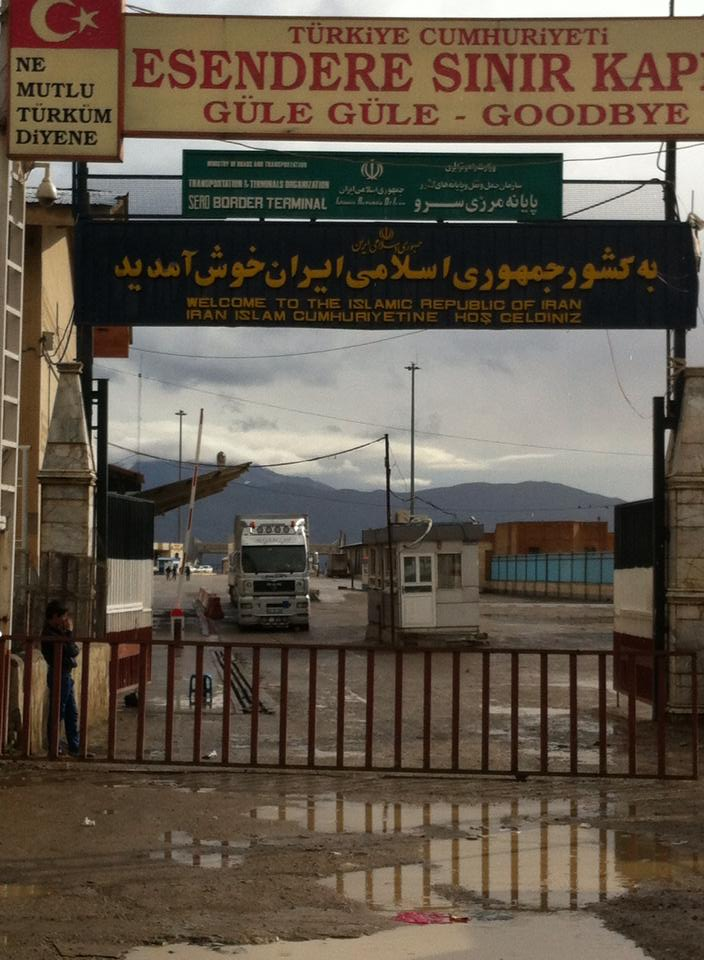
Border crossing with Iran at Esendere

Esendere (Kurdish: Bajêrga mezin, Armenian: Բաժերգյա, romanized: Bazhergya) is a belde in Yüksekova District in Hakkâri Province in Turkey. The belde is populated by Kurds of the Dirî and Geravî tribes and had a population of 4,497 in 2023.

The State road D.400 runs through Esendere before it ends at the border with Iran.

It comprises the neighborhoods of Güvenli, Merkez, Sarıyıldız and Yılmaz.

== Population ==
Population history from 1997 to 2023:

Population
Year	Pop.	±%
1997	3,153	—
2007	3,343	+6.0%
2012	3,337	−0.2%
2017	3,222	−3.4%
2022	2,786	−13.5%
2023	4,497	+61.4%
