= Qotur Rural District =

Rural district in West Azerbaijan province, Iran

Qotur Rural District Persian: دهستان قطور
- Rural District
- Location within Iran
- Coordinates: 38°29′N 44°26′E
- Country: Iran
- Province: West Azerbaijan
- County: Khoy
- District: Qotur
- Established: 1987
- Capital: Qotur

Population (2016)
  - Total: 11,105
- Time zone: UTC+3:30 (IRST)

Qotur Rural District (Persian: دهستان قطور) is in Qotur District of Khoy County, West Azerbaijan province, Iran. It is administered from the city of Qotur.

== Demographics ==
=== Population ===
At the time of the 2006 National Census, the rural district's population was 14,894 in 2,610 households. There were 12,448 inhabitants in 2,653 households at the following census of 2011. The 2016 census measured the population of the rural district as 11,105 in 2,645 households. The most populous of its 29 villages was Makhin, with 1,306 people.

=== Other villages in the rural district ===
- Balajuk
- Garnavik
- Givaran
- Habash-e Olya
- Habash-e Sofla
- Hastehjuk
- Kutanabad
- Mir Omar
- Razi
- Tarsabad
