= Qotur District =

District in West Azerbaijan province, Iran

Qotur District Persian: بخش قطور
- District
- Location within Iran
- Coordinates: 38°29′N 44°31′E
- Country: Iran
- Province: West Azerbaijan
- County: Khoy
- Established: 1997
- Capital: Qotur

Population (2016)
  - Total: 24,591
- Time zone: UTC+3:30 (IRST)

Qotur District (Persian: بخش قطور) is in Khoy County, West Azerbaijan province, Iran. Its capital is the city of Qotur.

== History ==
The village of Qotur was converted to a city in 2007.

== Demographics ==
=== Population ===
At the time of the 2006 National Census, the district's population was 24,407 in 4,339 households. The following census in 2011 counted 26,583 people in 5,700 households. The 2016 census measured the population of the district as 24,591 inhabitants in 5,838 households.

=== Administrative divisions ===
Qotur District Population
Administrative Divisions	2006	2011	2016
Qotur RD	14,894	12,448	11,105
Zeri RD	9,513	9,472	8,339
Qotur (city)		4,663	5,147
Total	24,407	26,583	24,591
RD = Rural District
