= Sidewalk cycling =

Cycling on pedestrian footpaths

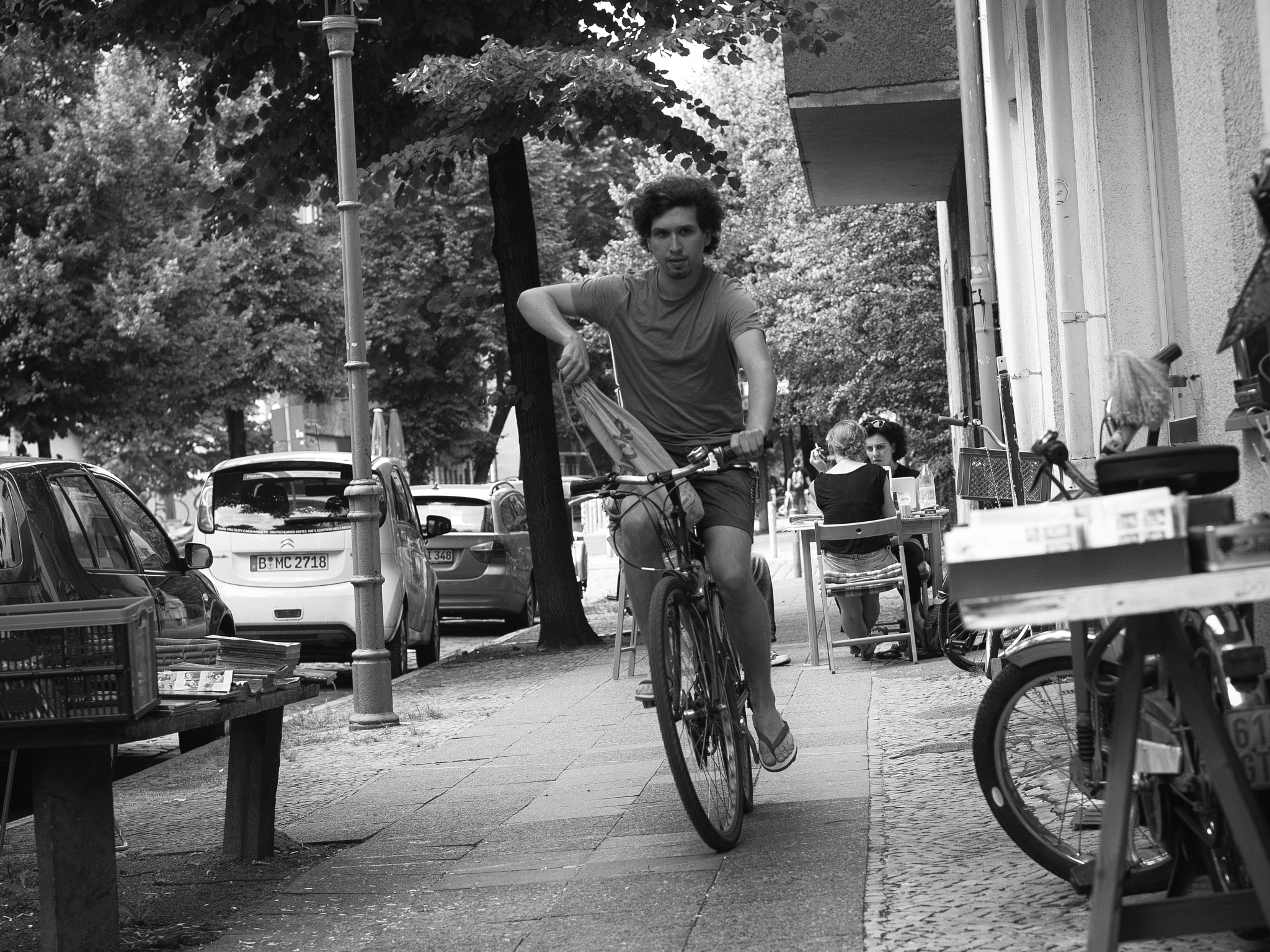
Cyclist on sidewalk between lamp posts and outdoor dining

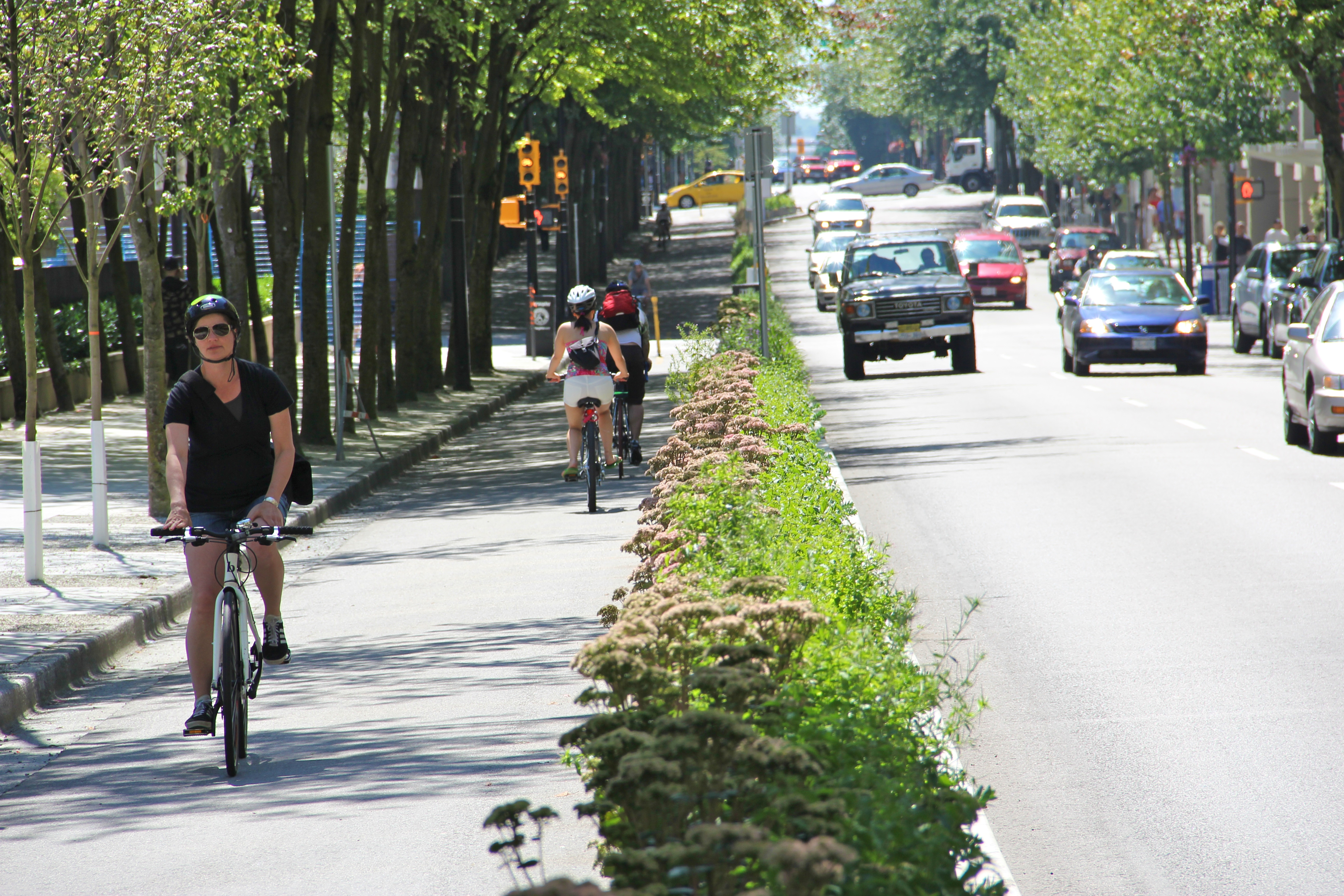
Separated cycle path, with physical barriers against both the road and the sidewalk

Sidewalk cycling is the practice of riding bicycles on sidewalks or footpaths, where pedestrians usually have priority. It is controversial, and is illegal in many countries (including well-known cycling countries such as the Netherlands and Denmark), in some municipalities, cities or districts, while in some places it is only permitted for children up to the age of 12 or 14.

Cycling on sidewalks puts cyclists in direct conflict with pedestrians, and undermines the principle of a reverse traffic pyramid. Some instead advocate vehicular cycling in places without dedicated cycling infrastructure, which is in line with the principle of an inverted traffic pyramid that prioritizes the convenience and safety of pedestrians, cyclists, and motorists, in that order.

Some argue that cars take up most of the traffic, while cyclists and pedestrians often come second in urban planning and traffic planning, and have to "fight for the crumbs". In contrast, sidewalks are designed for walking speed, and often have curbs and other obstacles (benches, signs, lamp posts, garbage cans) that make them uncomfortable or risky to cycle on. Cycling on sidewalks has been greatly reduced in places where streets have been redesigned with pedestrians and cyclists in mind.

== History ==
Most legislation assumes for cycling either on separate cycling infrastructure or together with cars. In Norway, cycling on sidewalks was allowed for adults in 1978, and continued in 1986. It has been argued that the original intent of the law was for children and "weak" cyclists to use the sidewalk, while adults still were expected to use the roadway for cycling. In a commentary on why Norwegian cycling culture in the 2010s has become so aggressive, it has been argued that it was a big mistake to allow cycling on sidewalks in the 1970s. Some argue that allowing cycling on sidewalks even prevents development of dedicated cycling infrastructure. On the other hand, it has been argued that the development of dedicated cycling infrastructure also benefits motorists and pedestrians.

== Causes ==
Reasons why many cyclists choose to cycle on the sidewalk may be less perceived risk, although the actual risk is often higher compared to cycling on the road. Some cyclists do so because it is perceived as a "faster" route. Some choose to cycle fast for exercise, or cycle on and off the sidewalk to avoid "losing speed". Sometimes cyclists prefer the sidewalk to cycling in narrow bike lanes (which lack protection from cars).

== Risks ==
Relative risks of crossing a road intersection. Crossing a secluded cycle path was found in one study to be up to 11.9 times riskier than cycling in the middle of a road lane

Sidewalk cycling is associated with many types of serious accidents between cars and bicycles, particularly at intersections and crosswalks, because drivers do not typically expect traffic coming from the sidewalk at high speeds, or may have difficulty seeing cyclists due to the design of intersections (regardless of who has the right of way).

The risk of collisions with cars increases significantly, and it has been claimed that adults experience 4-6 times more collisions when cycling on sidewalks than on roads. Cyclists become less visible to motorists, and the degree of improvisation results in a greater risk that cyclists' maneuvers appear unexpected to motorists. At intersections, motorists may perceive cyclists as "coming out of nowhere." When cycling on sidewalks, cyclists should also be particularly alert when crossing driveways and exits.

== Attitudes ==
Some cyclists believe that cycling on the sidewalk is humiliating and that they have the right to cycle on the road. Cycling on the sidewalk is also seen as "forbidden fruit" by some. On the other hand, some believe that one must be fearless as a cyclist to dare to cycle with cars.

Since cyclists travel at significantly higher speeds than pedestrians they can make pedestrians feel unsafe. In particular there have been several examples of conflicts between dog owners and cyclists, for various reasons, since dogs can move unpredictably.

== Etiquette ==
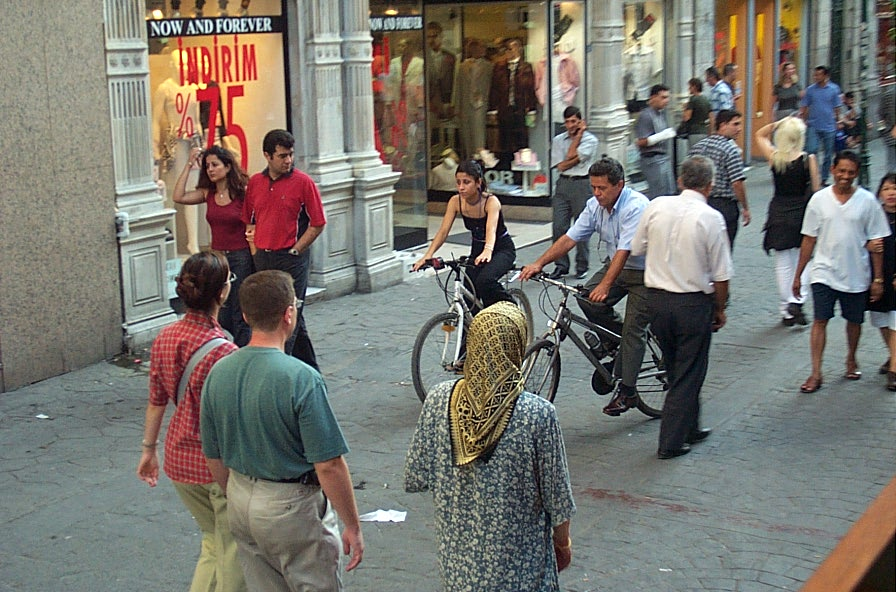
Cycling in a crowded area in Beyoglu, Istanbul

Some recommend to always get off and walk the bike on the sidewalk. In cases where cycling on the sidewalk is permitted, there are rules and recommendations to ensure that pedestrians feel safe. For example, the Norwegian traffic regulations require that cyclists pass at walking speed, with a good distance, and in any case not faster than 6 km/h (3.7 mph), but in practice this has proven difficult for cyclists to comply with.

If one must cycle on a sidewalk or footpath one should pay the utmost attention to pedestrians:

- Reduce speed, and ride as close to walking speed as possible
- Give way to pedestrians
- Give an audiable alert to warn pedestrians
- Pass pedestrians gently and respectfully
- Get off and walk the bike if conditions warrant it
- Keep distance from doors and side paths, and always watch out for cars that may cross the sidewalk
- Do not ride against traffic, and if necessary, cross the road to continue on the right side
- Return to riding on the road at the first safe opportunity

== Legality ==
Cycling on sidewalks prohibited
Legal after discretionary assessment
Allowed to ride on sidewalks

Country	Legal status
Netherlands	Cycling on sidewalks is prohibited (55 euro fine), except that children up to 12 years old riding smaller bicycles may use sidewalks in some cases.
Denmark	Cycling on sidewalks prohibited.
Sweden	Cycling on sidewalks prohibited (500 kr fine), except children under 8 years.
Norway	In theory permitted as long as one does not inconvenience pedestrians, but requires passing pedestrians at a good distance and at a maximum speed of 6 kilometres (3.7 mi)/h, which in practice means that cycling on sidewalks is prohibited in most cases if there are pedestrians. The rules are not enforced in practice.
Finland	Cycling on sidewalks is prohibited, except for children under 12 years of age.
Iceland	Allowed as long as the cyclist does not inconvenience pedestrians.
United Kingdom	Cycling on sidewalks is prohibited (30 pound fine).
Germany	Cycling on sidewalks is generally prohibited (55 to 100 euro fine), except for children up to 10 years of age. In places where it is specifically permitted, cyclists must adjust their speed and always give way to pedestrians.
France	Cycling on sidewalks is prohibited (135 euro fine), except for children under 8 years of age as long as the child does not obstruct pedestrians.
Belgium	Cycling on sidewalks is prohibited inside built-up areas. Outside built-up areas, it is allowed if the sidewalk is on the right-hand side and there is no cycle path. Children under 10 years of age can ride bicycles on sidewalks if they adjust their speed and give way to pedestrians.
Italy	Cycling on sidewalks is prohibited (41 euro fine), except for children under 8 years of age.
Australia	Varies between states and territories. Allowed in Queensland and Western Australia as long as cyclists show consideration for pedestrians. Only allowed for children under 12 in New South Wales and Victoria.
Austria	Cycling on sidewalks prohibited.
Canada	Varies between the different provinces.
Chile	Cycling on sidewalks prohibited, except if there are obstacles in the roadway. Children under 14 or the elderly can ride bicycles on sidewalks.
Colombia	Cycling on sidewalks prohibited.
Costa Rica	Cycling on sidewalks prohibited.
(Czech Republic) Czechia	Cycling on sidewalks prohibited.
Estonia	Cycling on the sidewalk is only permitted if it is significantly difficult to cycle on the roadway due to the condition of the road. It is stringent for children under 13, but even these should generally not cycle on the sidewalk.
Greece	Cycling on sidewalks prohibited.
Hungary	Cycling on the sidewalk is allowed if the road is poorly suited for cycling, but at a maximum speed of 10 kilometres (6.2 mi)/h, and pedestrians cannot be obstructed.
(Republic of Ireland) Ireland	Cycling on sidewalks is prohibited unless entering or exiting a property.
Israel	Cycling on sidewalks prohibited.
Japan	Cycling on sidewalks is generally prohibited, except if circumstances make it unavoidable and for people under 13, over 70 and the disabled. Pedestrians have priority, and the maximum speed is 10 km/h (6.2 mph).
South Korea	Generally, cyclists must use cycle paths or cycle together with cars, unless the sidewalk is specially signposted for cyclists or the cyclists deems use of the sidewalk necessary due to an unusable road. Exceptions for children, the elderly and the disabled.
Latvia	If it is impossible, difficult or dangerous to cycle on the roadway, the cyclist may choose to cycle on the sidewalk at walking speed. Children under 12 years of age can also cycle on the sidewalk.
Lithuania	Cyclists are expected to cycle to use cycle paths or cycle together with cars. If choosing to cycle on the sidewalk, the cyclist must not obstruct pedestrians, and must cycle at a walking pace (3–7 km/h (1.9–4.3 mph)) and pass at a good distance.
Luxembourg	Cycling on sidewalks prohibited. Exception for children under 13 as long as pedestrians are not disturbed.
New Zealand	Cycling on sidewalks is prohibited unless delivering mail, or having a bicycle with small wheels that are smaller than 355 mm (typical on children's bicycles), or it is specifically marked as a combined pedestrian and bicycle path.
Poland	Cycling on sidewalks is prohibited (50 PLN fine), except in difficult weather conditions (e.g. snow), or for children up to 10 years of age, or if there is a lack of cycling infrastructure and the speed limit is higher than 50 km/h (31 mph) as well as the sidewalk being wider than 2 meters.
Portugal	Cycling on sidewalks is prohibited, except for children up to 10 years old.
Slovakia	Cycling on sidewalks is prohibited, except for children under 10 years of age, or on sidewalks that are specially marked for cyclists, but in any case no faster than 20 km/h (12 mph).
Slovenia	Cycling on sidewalks is prohibited, except for children up to 6 years old.
Spain	Cycling on sidewalks is prohibited, unless it is specifically marked for shared use, or if there is no dedicated cycle lane and the sidewalk is at least 3 meters wide and cycling at a maximum speed of 10 km/h (6.2 mph), keeping at least 1 meter distance from pedestrians and being able to cycle in a straight line for more than 5 meters.
Switzerland	Cycling on sidewalks is prohibited, except for children under 12 years of age where there is no bike path and as long as consideration is given to pedestrians.
Turkey	Cycling on sidewalks prohibited.
(United States) USA	Varies significantly between different state and local governments.
Brazil	Cycling on sidewalks is prohibited and subject to fines and bicycle confiscation, except where there is specific signage permitting it.
Singapore	Cycling on the sidewalk is allowed, but at a maximum speed of 10 km/h (6.2 mph), while the speed limit is 25 km/h (16 mph) when cycling on sidewalks that have a dedicated cycling lane and pedestrians cannot be obstructed.
Malaysia	Cycling on the sidewalk is prohibited unless it is marked as a designated shared cycling footpath.

== See also ==
- Dooring, cycling accident due to car door opening
- Electric kick scooter
- Hook turn, maneuver to turn across a lane of oncoming traffic
- Jaywalking, walking on or crossing a road (including a cycle path) illegally on foot
- Jaycycling, reckless cycling
- Pedestrian zones sometimes allow cycling
- Safety of cycling infrastructure, how design choices for cycle paths and adjacent sidewalks, crosswalks and roads affect the safety of cyclists and pedestrians
- Sidewalk rage, aggressive or angry behavior exhibited by pedestrians
