= Transport in Turkey =

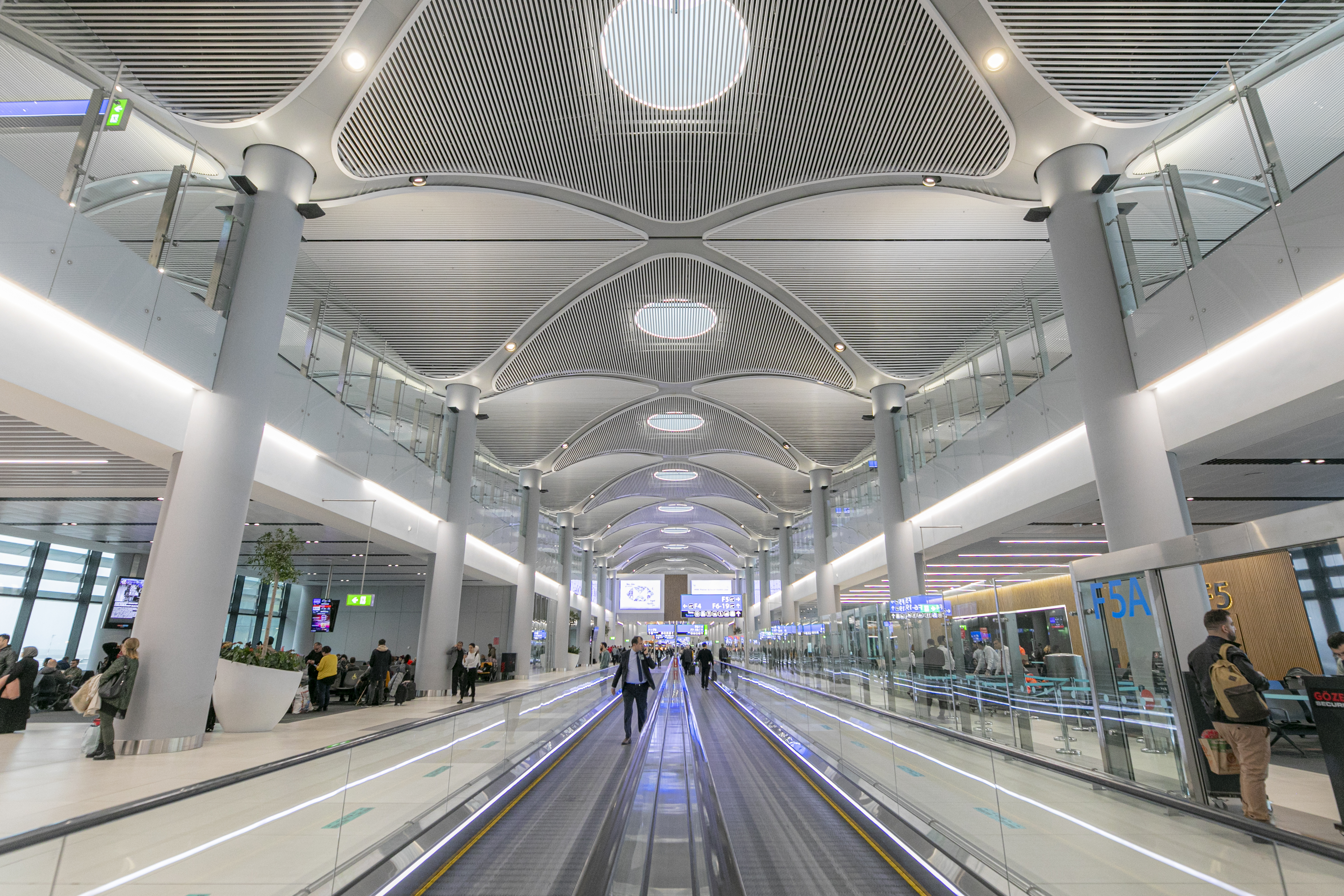
Istanbul Airport is the main international airport serving Istanbul, Turkey. It is a major hub in the world.

Transport in Turkey is road-dominated and mostly fuelled by diesel. Transport consumes a quarter of energy in Turkey, and is a major source of air pollution in Turkey and greenhouse gas emissions by Turkey. The World Health Organization has called for more active transport such as cycling. As of 2023 health impact assessment is not done in Turkey.

== Rail transport ==
=== Rail network ===
Rail transport map of Turkey along with urban rail networks indication

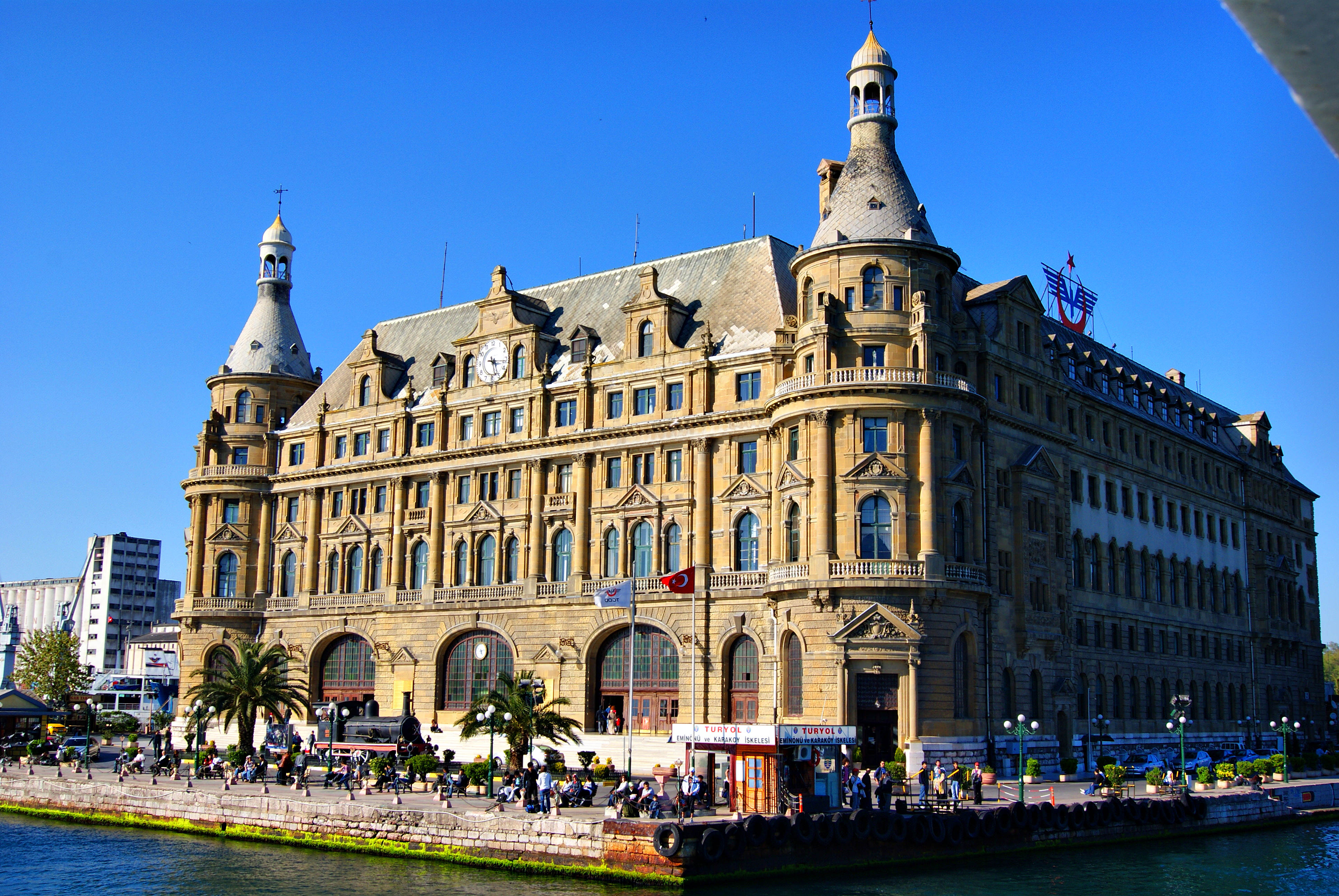
Haydarpaşa railway station built in 1909 by the Anatolian Railway (CFOA) as the western terminus of the Baghdad and Hedjaz railways, has become a symbol of Istanbul and Turkey and is famous throughout the Middle East.

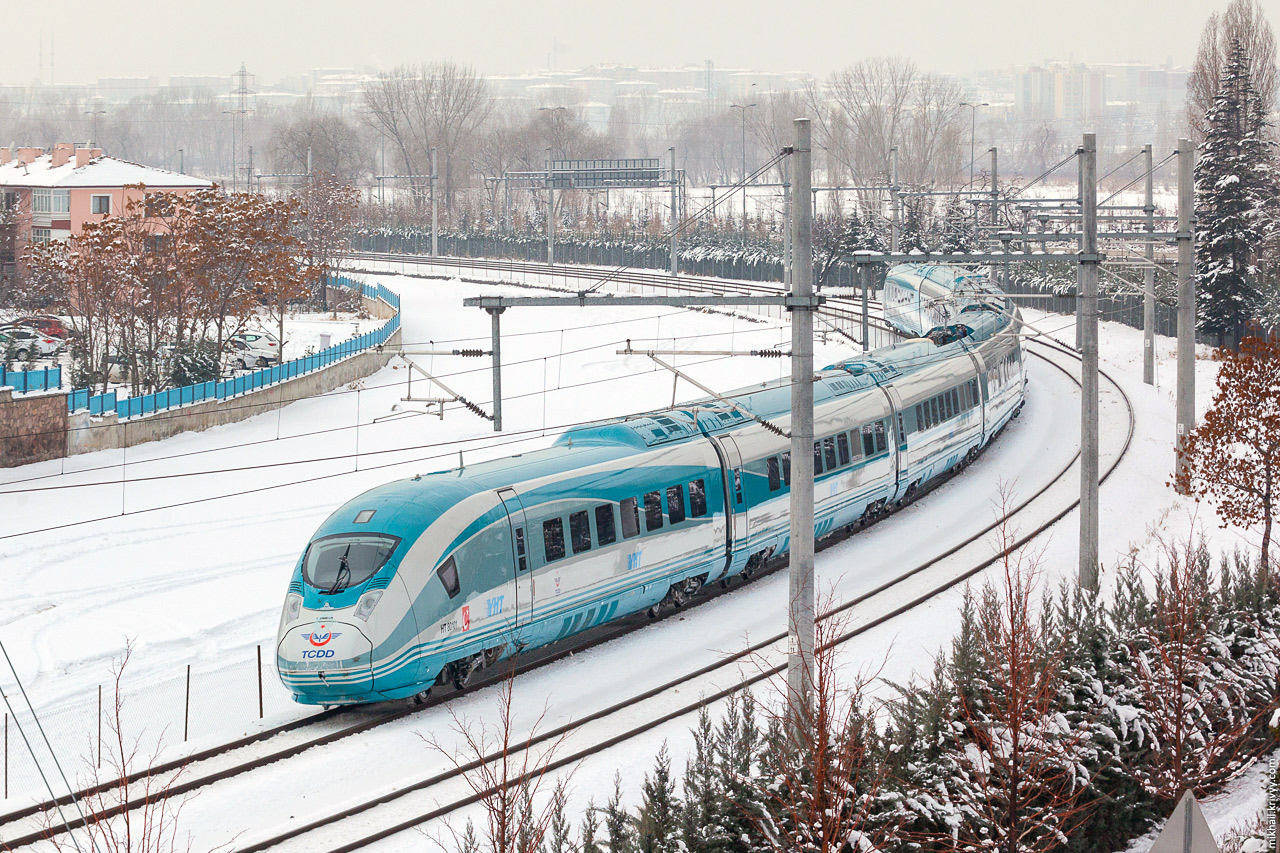
TCDD HT80000 (Siemens Velaro TR) has a maximum operating speed of 300 km/h (186 mph)

The TCDD – Türkiye Devlet Demir Yolları (Turkish State Railways) possess 13,919 km of 1,435 mm (4 ft 8 1/2 in) gauge, of which 7,142 km are electrified (2024). There are daily regular passenger trains all through the network. TCDD has started an investment program of building 5.000 km high-speed lines until 2023. Multiple high speed train routes are running, including: Ankara-Eskişehir-İstanbul, Ankara-Konya and Ankara-Sivas lines.

The freight transportation is mainly organized as block trains for domestic routes, since TCDD discourages under 200 to loads by surcharges.

=== Urban rail ===
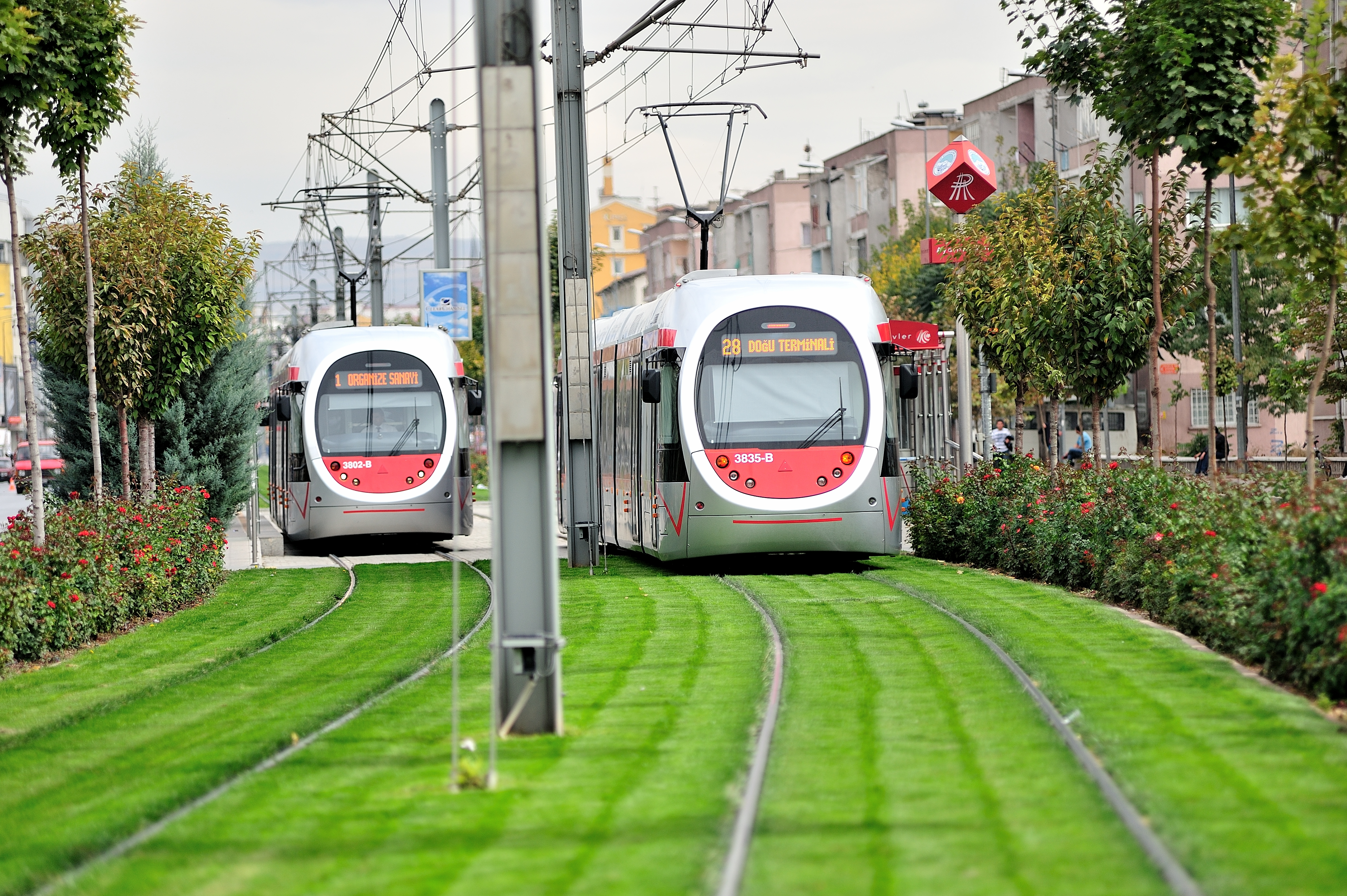
Trams in Kayseri

After almost 30 years without any trams, Turkey is experiencing a revival in trams. Established in 1992, the tram system of Istanbul earned the best large-scale tram management award in 2005. Another award-winning tram network belongs to Eskişehir (EsTram) where a modern tram system opened in 2004. In 2010, Kayseri (Kayseray) won the "Worldwide Project of the Year" and "Best Urban Integration Project of the Year" awards for being a light rail system with nearly the entire route constructed as a green track. Several other cities are planning or constructing tram lines, with modern low-flow trams.

By 2014, there have been 12 cities in Turkey using railroads for transportation.

- Cities with commuter rail systems: Istanbul, Ankara, İzmir, Sakarya, Gaziantep
- Cities with metro systems: Istanbul, Ankara, İzmir, Bursa, Adana
- Cities with light rail transit systems: Istanbul, Ankara, İzmir, Adana, Bursa, Eskişehir, Konya, Antalya, Kayseri, Gaziantep, Samsun, Kocaeli.

=== Railway links with adjacent countries ===
- Azerbaijan – via Georgia
  (Kars-Nakhchivan-Baku under construction)
- Armenia – closed (see Kars Gyumri Akhalkalaki railway line)
- Bulgaria – open – 1,435 mm (4 ft 8 1/2 in)
- (Georgia (country)) Georgia – under reconstruction – break-of-gauge 1,435 mm (4 ft 8 1/2 in)/1,520 mm (4 ft 11 27/32 in).
- Greece – open – 1,435 mm (4 ft 8 1/2 in) (Note: Passenger services as Express of Friendship/Filia suspended from 13 February 2012)
- Iran – via Lake Van train ferry – same gauge
- Iraq – Suggested as part of Iraq–Europe Development Road
- Syria – closed (plans to reopen it is on the agenda)– 1,435 mm (4 ft 8 1/2 in) (Note: It was suspended after breakout of Syrian Civil War in 29 August 2011)

== Road transport ==
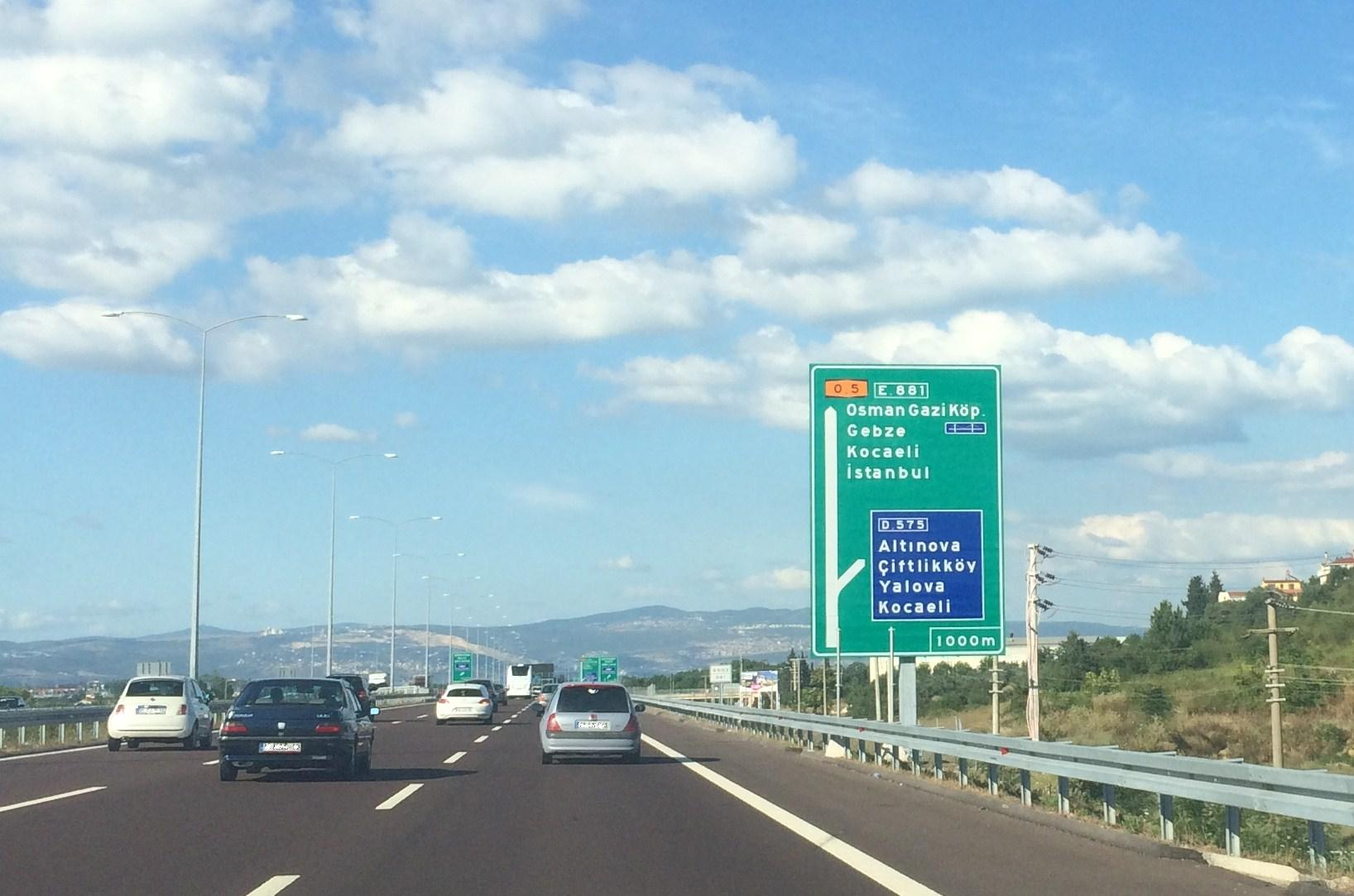
Otoyol 5 near Altınova exit

Road transport is responsible for much air pollution in Turkey and almost a fifth of Turkey's greenhouse gas emissions, mainly via diesel. It is one of 3 G20 countries without a fuel efficiency standard. As of 2020 there are many old, inefficient, polluting trucks. Retiring old polluting vehicles by forcing all cars and trucks to meet tailpipe emission standards would reduce disease, especially from polycyclic aromatic hydrocarbons. As of 2024, the country has a roadway network of 68,617 kilometres (42,637 miles). The Eurasia Tunnel (2016) provides an undersea road connection for motor vehicles. The Bosphorus Bridge (1973), Fatih Sultan Mehmet Bridge (1988) and Yavuz Sultan Selim Bridge (2016) are the three suspension bridges connecting the European and Asian shores of the Bosphorus strait. The Osman Gazi Bridge (2016) connects the northern and southern shores of the Gulf of İzmit. The 1915 Çanakkale Bridge (2022), connects the European and Asian shores of the Dardanelles strait.

Fuel quality and emissions standards are not as good as those in the EU, and as of 2026 about 5% of cars on the road are hybrid and 3% electric but almost no commercial vehicles on the road are electric. As of 2026 there is an extra 40% tariff on imported Chinese electric vehicles.

In 2023 the World Bank said the government should plan and subsidize the rollout of public electric car chargers, particularly because so many people live in flats. They said that a subsidy would provide environmental and social benefits. They also said that cities should set an end date for diesel buses.

In the same year, according to a study by Dr. Hüseyin Korkmaz of Istanbul University, Istanbul drivers lost an average of 105 hours due to traffic congestion. The research, utilizing AI to analyze data from the Turkish National Police, identified 97,354 traffic accidents in the city that year, with many occurring during peak hours on major routes. The study highlights that even minor accidents can significantly disrupt traffic flow, especially when lanes are closed. Dr. Korkmaz suggests that addressing Istanbul's traffic issues requires improved public transportation, better urban planning, and measures to control population growth and vehicle usage.

=== Road network ===
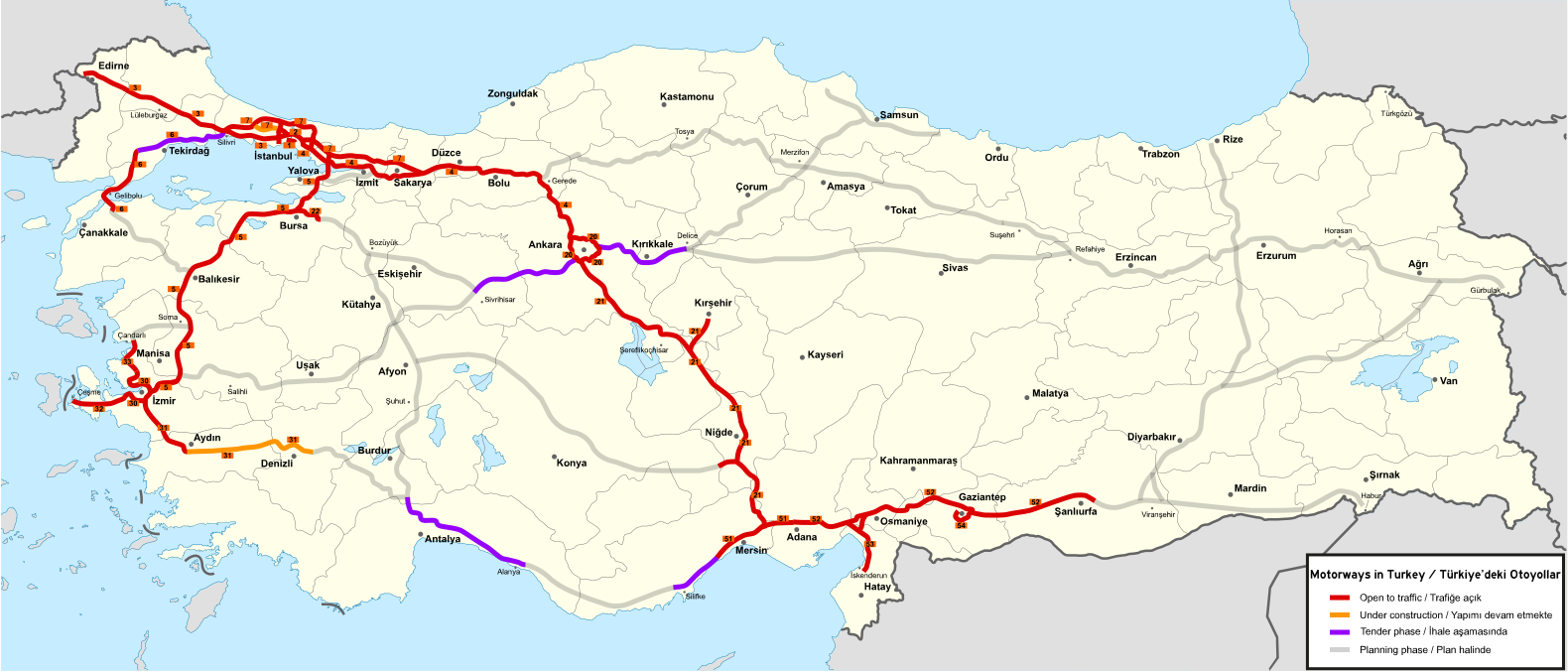
Turkish Otoyol network map

There are three types of intercity roads in Turkey:

– The first is the historical and free road network called State roads (Devlet Yolları) that are completely under the responsibility of the General Directorate of Highways except for urban sections (like the sections falling within the inner part of ring roads of Ankara, Istanbul or İzmir. Even if they mostly possess dual carriageways and interchanges, they also have some traffic lights and intersections.

– The second type of roads are controlled-access highways that are officially named Otoyol. But it isn't uncommon that people in Turkey call them Otoban (referring to Autobahn) as this types of roads entered popular culture by the means of Turks in Germany. They also depend on the General Directorate of Highways except those that are financed with a BOT model.

– The third type of roads are provincial roads (Il Yolları) are highways of secondary importance linking districts within a province to each other, the provincial center, the districts in the neighboring provinces, the state roads, railway stations, seaports, and airports

- Motorways: Motorway 3.796 km (January 2025)
- Dual carriageways: 29.673 km (January 2025)
- State Highways 30.832 km (January 2025)
- Provincial Roads 33.922 km (January 2025)
- Motorway Projects‐Vision 8.325 km (in 2053)

As of 2023, there are 471 tunnels (total length 665 km) and 9.660 bridges (total length 739 km) on the network.

=== Public road transport ===
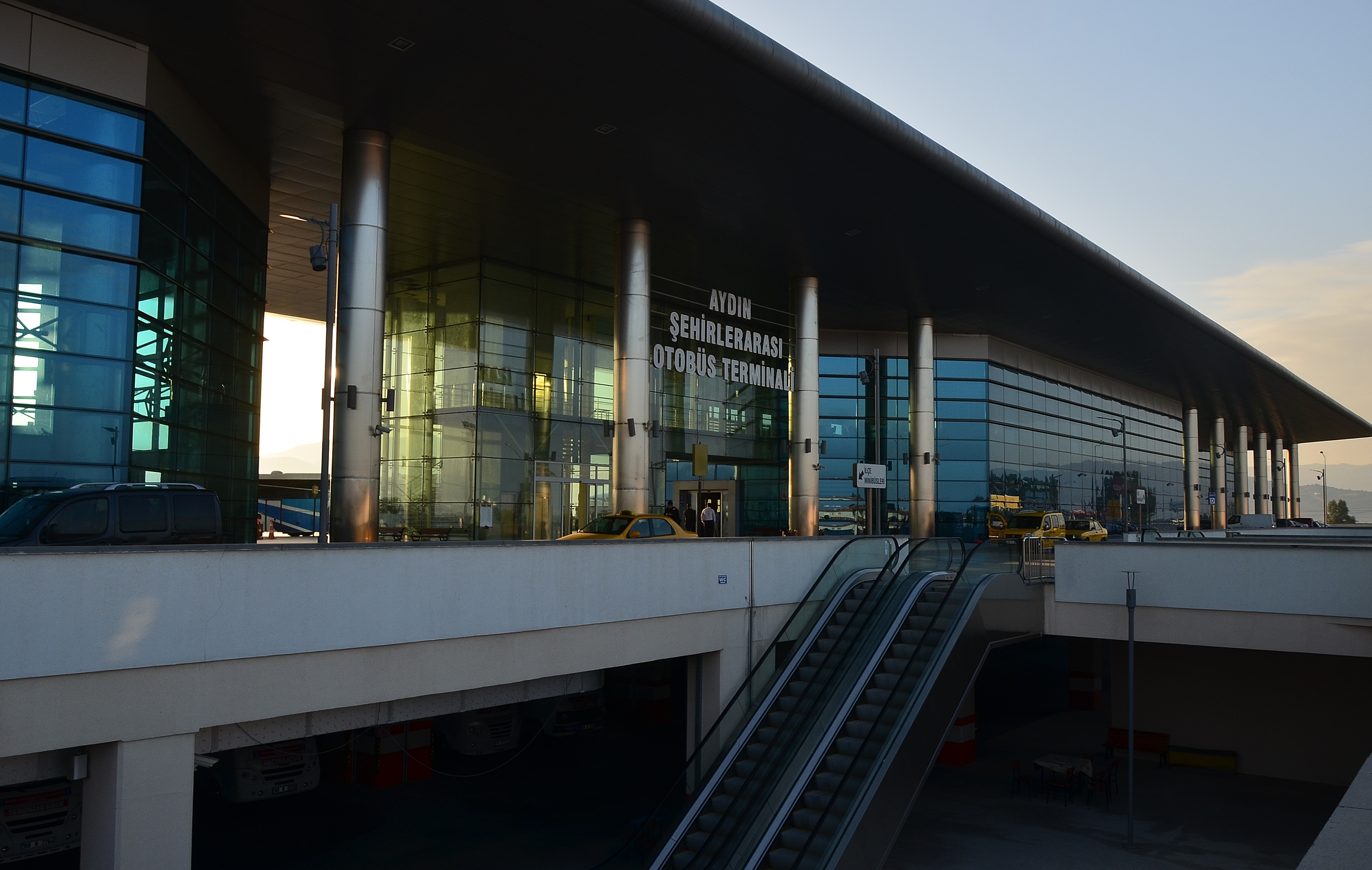
Intercity bus station in Aydın

There are numerous private bus companies providing connections between cities in Turkey. For local trips to villages there are dolmuşes, small vans that seat about twenty passengers. As of 2024, number of road vehicles is around 31 million. The number of vehicles by type and use is as follows.

- Car 16,232,458
- Minibus 522,608
- Bus 213,416
- Small truck 4,703,287
- Truck 1,000,326
- Motorcycle 6,261,927
- Special Purpose vehicle 102,100
- Tractor 2,265,267
- Total: 31,301,389

=== Motor vehicles by year (2002-2024) ===
| Yıl | Total | Car | Minibus | Bus | Small truck | Truck | Motorcycle | Special Purpose vehicle | Tractor |
|---|---|---|---|---|---|---|---|---|---|
| 2002 | 8.655.170 | 4.600.140 | 241.700 | 120.097 | 875.381 | 567.152 | 1.046.907 | 23.666 | 1.180.127 |
| 2003 | 8.903.843 | 4.700.343 | 245.394 | 123.500 | 973.457 | 579.010 | 1.073.415 | 24.468 | 1.184.256 |
| 2004 | 10.236.357 | 5.400.440 | 318.954 | 152.712 | 1.259.867 | 647.420 | 1.218.677 | 28.004 | 1.210.283 |
| 2005 | 11.145.826 | 5.772.745 | 338.539 | 163.390 | 1.475.057 | 676.929 | 1.441.066 | 30.333 | 1.247.767 |
| 2006 | 12.227.393 | 6.140.992 | 357.523 | 175.949 | 1.695.624 | 709.535 | 1.822.831 | 34.260 | 1.290.679 |
| 2007 | 13.022.945 | 6.472.156 | 372.601 | 189.128 | 1.890.459 | 729.202 | 2.003.492 | 38.573 | 1.327.334 |
| 2008 | 13.765.395 | 6.796.629 | 383.548 | 199.934 | 2.066.007 | 744.217 | 2.181.383 | 35.100 | 1.358.577 |
| 2009 | 14.316.700 | 7.093.964 | 384.053 | 201.033 | 2.204.951 | 727.302 | 2.303.261 | 34.104 | 1.368.032 |
| 2010 | 15.095.603 | 7.544.871 | 386.973 | 208.510 | 2.399.038 | 726.359 | 2.389.488 | 35.492 | 1.404.872 |
| 2011 | 16.089.528 | 8.113.111 | 389.435 | 219.906 | 2.611.104 | 728.458 | 2.527.190 | 34.116 | 1.466.208 |
| 2012 | 17.033.413 | 8.648.875 | 396.119 | 235.949 | 2.794.606 | 751.650 | 2.657.722 | 33.071 | 1.515.421 |
| 2013 | 17.939.447 | 9.283.923 | 421.848 | 219.885 | 2.933.050 | 755.950 | 2.722.826 | 36.148 | 1.565.817 |
| 2014 | 18.828.721 | 9.857.915 | 427.264 | 211.200 | 3.062.479 | 773.728 | 2.828.466 | 40.731 | 1.626.938 |
| 2015 | 19.994.472 | 10.589.337 | 449.213 | 217.056 | 3.255.299 | 804.319 | 2.938.364 | 45.732 | 1.695.152 |
| 2016 | 21.090.424 | 11.317.998 | 463.933 | 220.361 | 3.442.483 | 825.334 | 3.003.733 | 50.818 | 1.765.764 |
| 2017 | 22.218.945 | 12.035.978 | 478.618 | 221.885 | 3.642.625 | 838.718 | 3.102.800 | 60.099 | 1.838.222 |
| 2018 | 22.865.921 | 12.398.190 | 487.527 | 218.523 | 3.755.580 | 845.462 | 3.211.328 | 63.359 | 1.885.952 |
| 2019 | 23.156.975 | 12.503.049 | 493.373 | 213.358 | 3.796.919 | 844.481 | 3.331.326 | 65.470 | 1.908.999 |
| 2020 | 24.144.857 | 13.099.041 | 493.395 | 212.407 | 3.938.732 | 859.670 | 3.512.576 | 70.309 | 1.958.727 |
| 2021 | 25.249.119 | 13.706.065 | 484.806 | 208.882 | 4.115 205 | 886.303 | 3.744.370 | 78.482 | 2.025.006 |
| 2022 | 26.482.847 | 14.269.352 | 487.381 | 208.442 | 4.277.424 | 919.125 | 4.141.914 | 85.276 | 2.093.933 |
| 2023 | 28.740.492 | 15.221.134 | 502.628 | 210.740 | 4.487.244 | 959.793 | 5.079.396 | 93.407 | 2.186.150 |
| 2024 | 31.301.389 | 16.232.458 | 522.608 | 213.416 | 4.703.287 | 1.000.326 | 6 261.927 | 102.100 | 2.265.267 |

=== Cycling ===
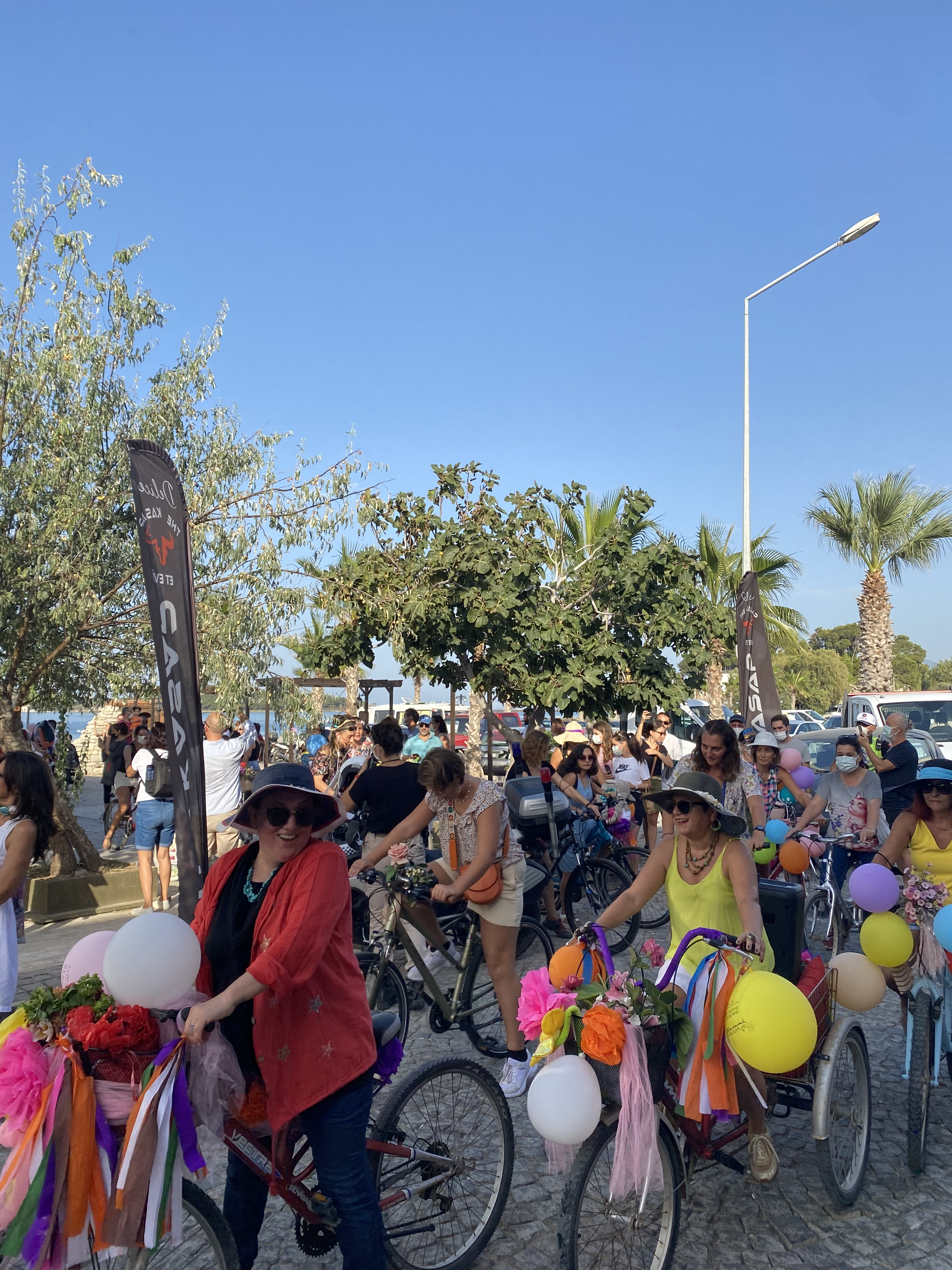
Fancy Women Bike Ride in Urla, İzmir

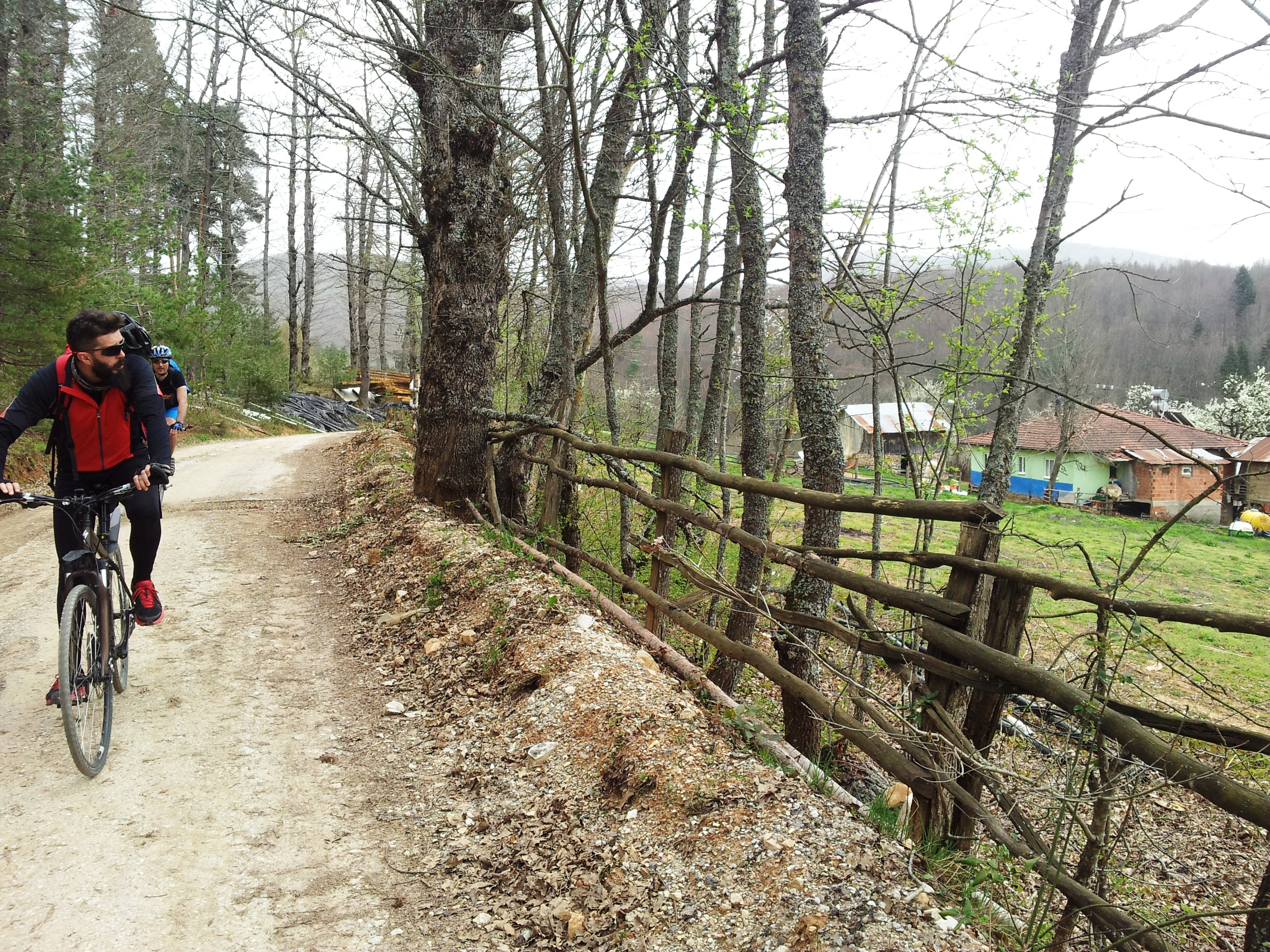
Rural west Turkey

Cycling in Turkey is held back by poor infrastructure. It is sometimes done for health reasons, and infrastructure is being improved. The World Health Organization has called for transport in Turkey to include more active transport such as cycling.

=== Escooters ===
Escooter rental is available in some cities, and escooters can be used on cycle paths, and on urban roads without cycle paths where the speed limit is below 50 kph.

=== Pedestrians ===
In 2024 over a thousand pedestrians were killed and over 42 thousand injured by traffic collisions. Suggestions to improve pedestrian safety include better enforcing existing speed limits and reducing them in some urban areas.

=== Car ownership ===
As of 2024 about 10% of cars sold were electric, and over half the registered motor vehicles were cars - about 16.2 million - of which 5.5 million were diesel fueled, 5.2 million LPG, 4,9 million gasoline, 0.4 million hybrid, and 0.2 million electric.

== Air transport ==
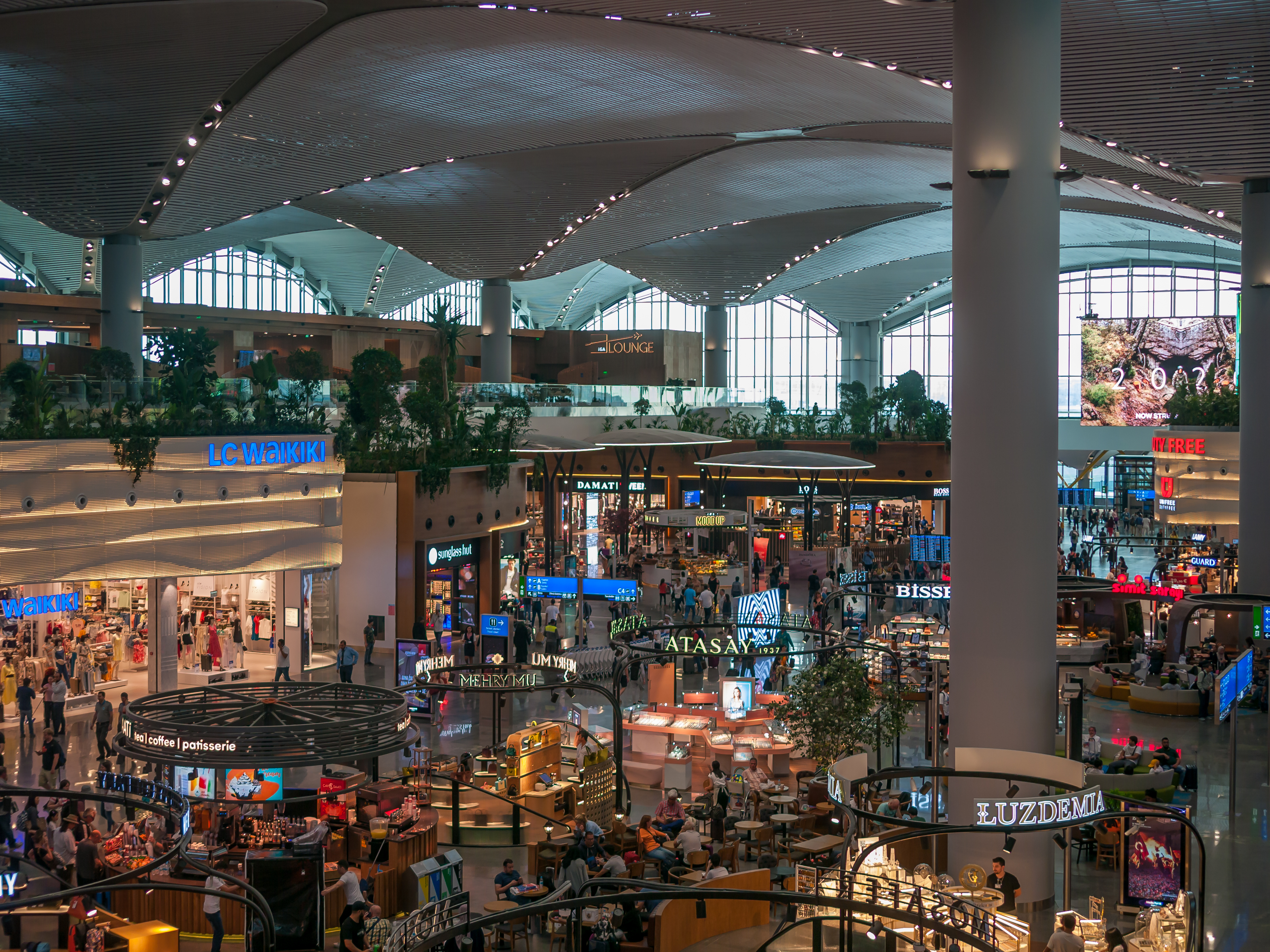
Istanbul Airport is the largest airport in Turkey.

In 2013 Turkey had the tenth largest passenger air market in the world with 74,353,297 passengers. In 2013 there were 98 airports in Turkey, including 22 international airports. As of 2015, Istanbul Atatürk Airport is the 11th busiest airport in the world, serving 31,833,324 passengers between January and July 2014, according to Airports Council International. The new (third) international airport of Istanbul is planned to be the largest airport in the world, with a capacity to serve 150 million passengers per annum. Turkish Airlines, flag carrier of Turkey since 1933, was selected by Skytrax as Europe's best airline for five consecutive years in 2011, 2012, 2013, 2014 and 2015. With 435 destinations (51 domestic and 384 international) in 126 countries worldwide, Turkish Airlines is the largest carrier in the world by number of countries served as of 2016.

=== Airlines ===
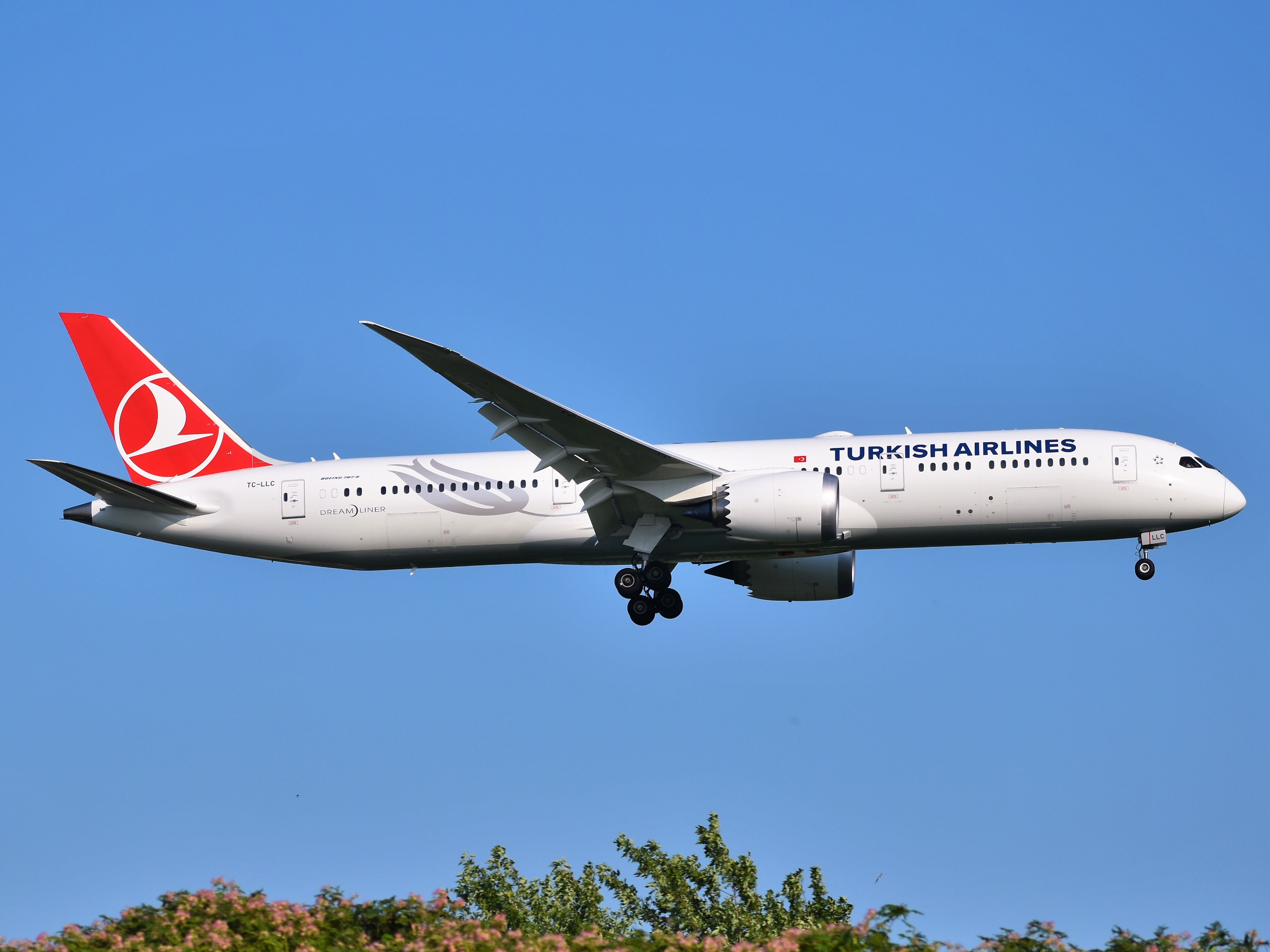
Turkish Airlines, the flag carrier of Turkey

=== Airports ===
Total number of Airports in Turkey: 117 (2007)

Airports – with paved runways
total: 88
over 3,047 m: 16
2,438 to 3,047 m:

1,524 to 2,437 m: 19
914 to 1,523 m: 16
under 914 m: 4 (2010) (Link:)

Airports – with unpaved runways
total: 11
1,524 to 2,437 m: 1
914 to 1,523 m: 6
under 914 m: 4 (2010) (Link:)

Heliports 20 (2010)

== Water transport ==
About 1,200 km

=== Ports and harbours ===
Black Sea

- Hopa
- Inebolu
- Samsun
- Trabzon
- Zonguldak

Aegean Sea

- İzmir

Mediterranean Sea

- İskenderun
- Mersin
- Antalya

Sea of Marmara Potential for electric ferries is being studied in 2026.

- Gemlik
- Bandırma
- Istanbul
- İzmit
- Derince

== Air pollution ==
Road traffic is a major source of air pollution in Turkey, and Istanbul is one of the few European cities without a low emission zone.

Transport emitted 85 megatonnes of CO_{2} in 2018, about one tonne per person and 16 percent of Turkey's greenhouse gas emissions. Road transport dominated transport emissions with 79 megatonnes, including agricultural vehicles.

== See also ==
- Right to Clean Air Platform Turkey
- Public transport in Istanbul
- List of highways in Turkey
- Turkish State Highway System
- List of otoyol routes in Turkey
- Otoyol
- List of countries by vehicles per capita Turkey "total number of vehicles" 16th, Turkey "vehicles per capita" 66th

== Sources ==
- Difiglio, Prof. Carmine; Güray, Bora Şekip; Merdan, Ersin (November 2020). Turkey Energy Outlook. iicec.sabanciuniv.edu (Report). Sabanci University Istanbul International Center for Energy and Climate (IICEC). ISBN 978-605-70031-9-5.
- Bisiklet Yolları Klavuzu [Bicycle Path Guidelines] (PDF) (Report) (in Turkish). Ministry of Environment and Urban Planning (Turkey). December 2019.
