= Cycling in Turkey =

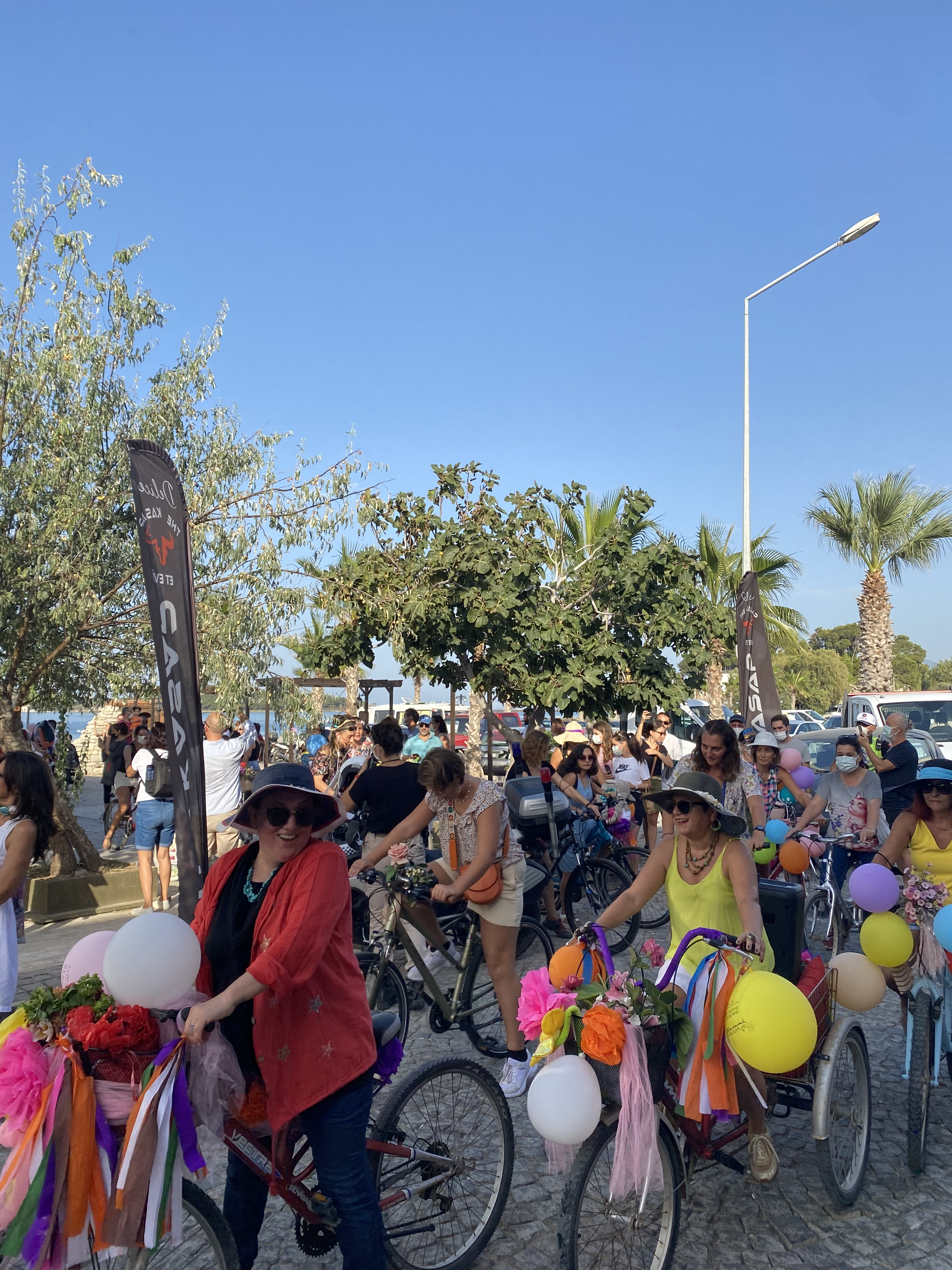
Fancy Women Bike Ride in Urla, İzmir

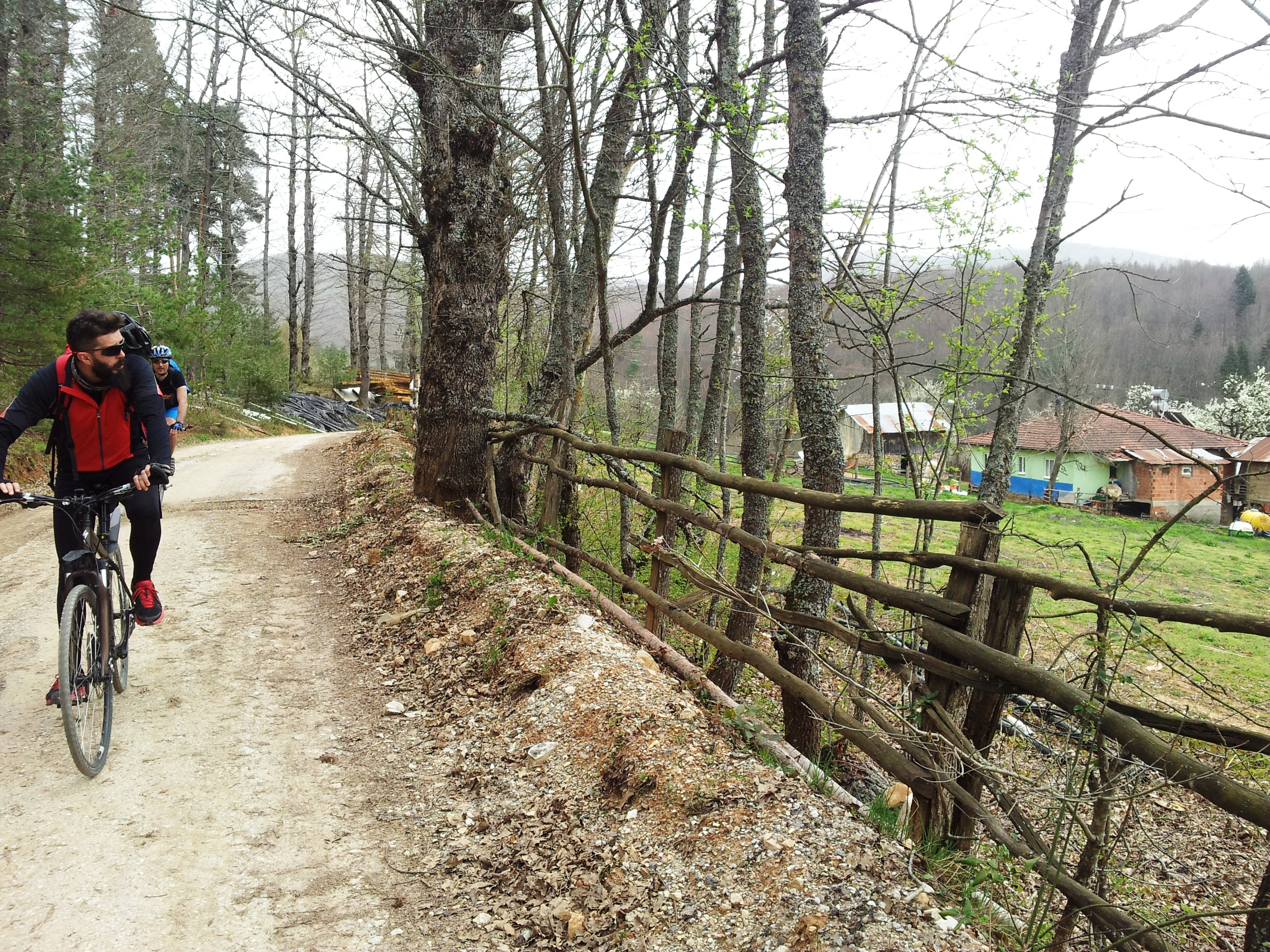
Rural west Turkey

Cycling in Turkey is held back by poor infrastructure. It is sometimes done for health reasons, and infrastructure is being improved. The World Health Organization has called for transport in Turkey to include more active transport such as cycling.

== History ==
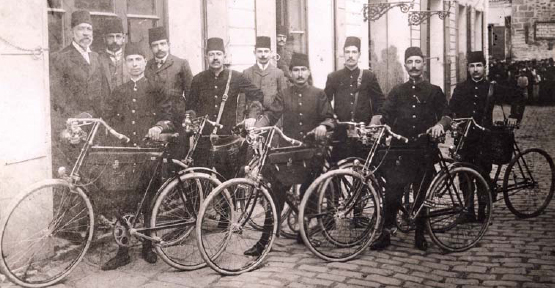
Postmen in Istanbul in late Ottoman times

At first the Ottomans cycled for transport and later also for sport. The army used bicycles. Many women in Turkey cycled, and cycling helped the feminist movement towards the end of the Ottoman Empire. Thomas Stevens went through Constantinople on his round the world trip, as did others later in the 19th century, publishing accounts such as Across Asia on a Bicycle: The Journey of Two American Students from Constantinople to Peking.

Rahmi Koç Museum has a display of bicycles.

== Utility cycling ==
A 2019 survey of Turkish college students found that 10 percent of cyclists wear a bike helmet. Respondents to a 2018 survey in Isparta said that Accident Prone Areas were the most important factor for integration with public transport. Some of the bike lanes created in that city in 2016 were removed in 2018, partly because roadside businesses wanted the space for car parking.

== Policy and manufacturing ==
The Ministry of Environment, Urbanisation and Climate Change has published a guide for cycle paths. There is not much data available to help plan where bicycle routes should go.

== Infrastructure ==
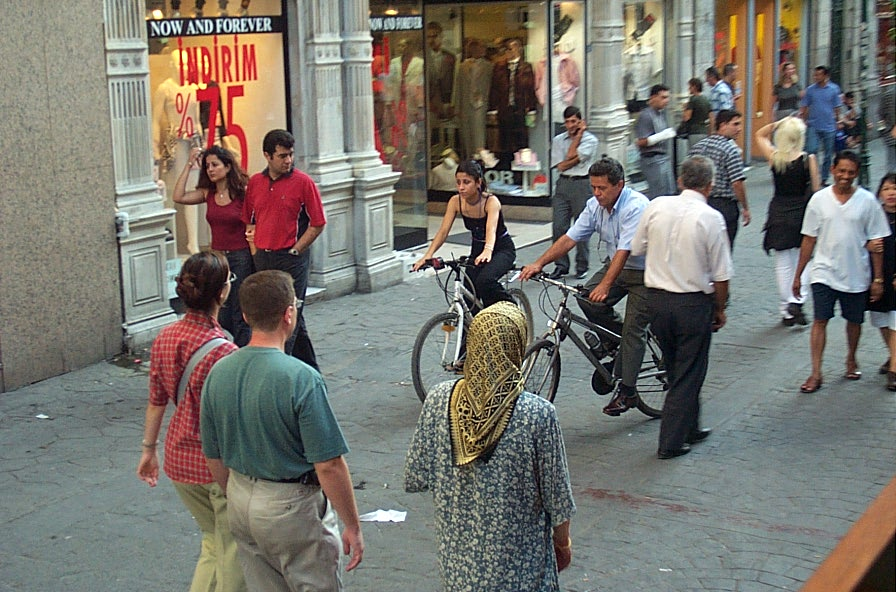
Sidewalk cycling in Beyoglu, Istanbul

In 2019 a new regulation on cycle paths was issued, but according to a 2020 study cities are not bike friendly. Cycle paths are sometimes not well connected. In 2021 a bicycle route master plan was published.

Suggestions have been made for Istanbul. Improvements were made in Istanbul during the COVID-19 pandemic. Locations close to shorelines are thought to be best for bike sharing stations. Konya has the most bike lanes with over 400 kilometres (250 mi). Bikes (except tandems) are allowed on the Istanbul metro outside peak hours and if folded at any time. The city's sustainable urban mobility plan in 2022 suggested cycle feeder routes and junction improvements.

Hatay claimed to have opened in 2020 the longest uninterrupted bike path in the world. Some of Turkey's bike paths have been integrated into the EuroVelo route network. The EV13 The Iron Curtain Trail follows 140 kilometres (87 mi) of the border with Bulgaria via Edirne. Around 500 kilometres (310 mi) of existing bike paths in İzmir were incorporated into the EV8 The Mediterranean Route in 2019.

== For sport and recreation ==
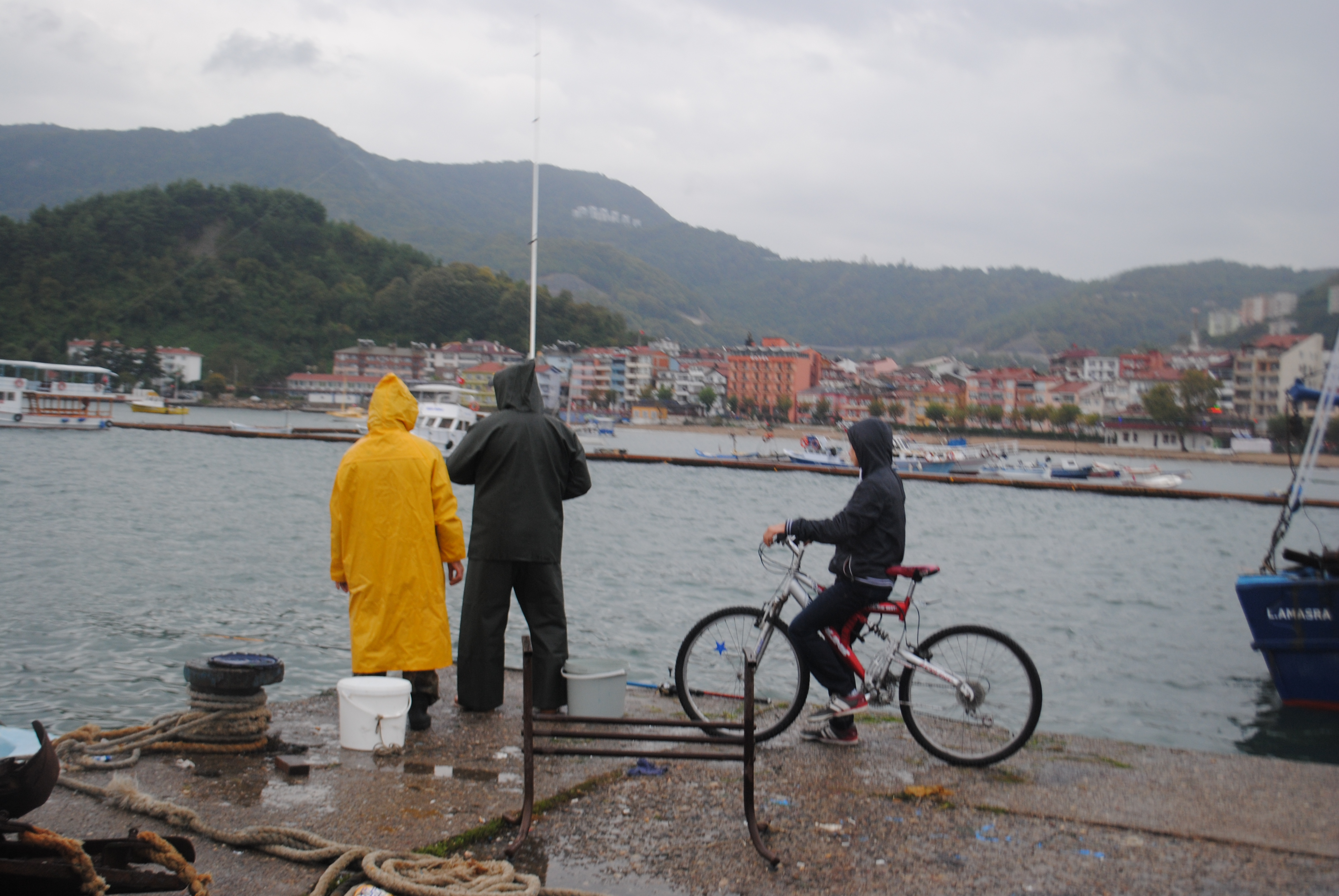
Amasra

The governing organisation for cycle sport in Turkey is the Turkish Cycling Federation. There is a velodrome in Istanbul. There are cycling festivals. Dogs such as Kangal can be a problem in rural areas, and some recommend dismounting.

=== Rides ===
Fancy Women Bike Ride (Turkish: Süslü Kadinlar Bisiklet Turu ) was started by Sema Gur, a high school teacher from Turkey. In 2013, three hundred women from Izmir, Turkey, participated in a Chic Women Bike Ride, which in subsequent years grew as an annual international event known as the Fancy Women Bike Ride on Car-Free Days. For the Fancy Women Bike Ride, women decorate their bikes and instead of wearing sporty biking gear, they dress and make themselves up as colorfully and fancifully as they like.

== Rules ==
Bicycles include electric bicycles whose maximum continuous rated power does not exceed 250 W, whose power decreases as they accelerate, and whose power is completely cut off after reaching a maximum speed of 25 km/h or immediately after the pedaling is interrupted. To ride on a highway cyclists must be over 11 and physically and mentally healthy. All traffic rules apply to cyclists. Helmets are not obligatory.

== See also ==
- Women and bicycling in Islam
