= Cycling in South Korea =

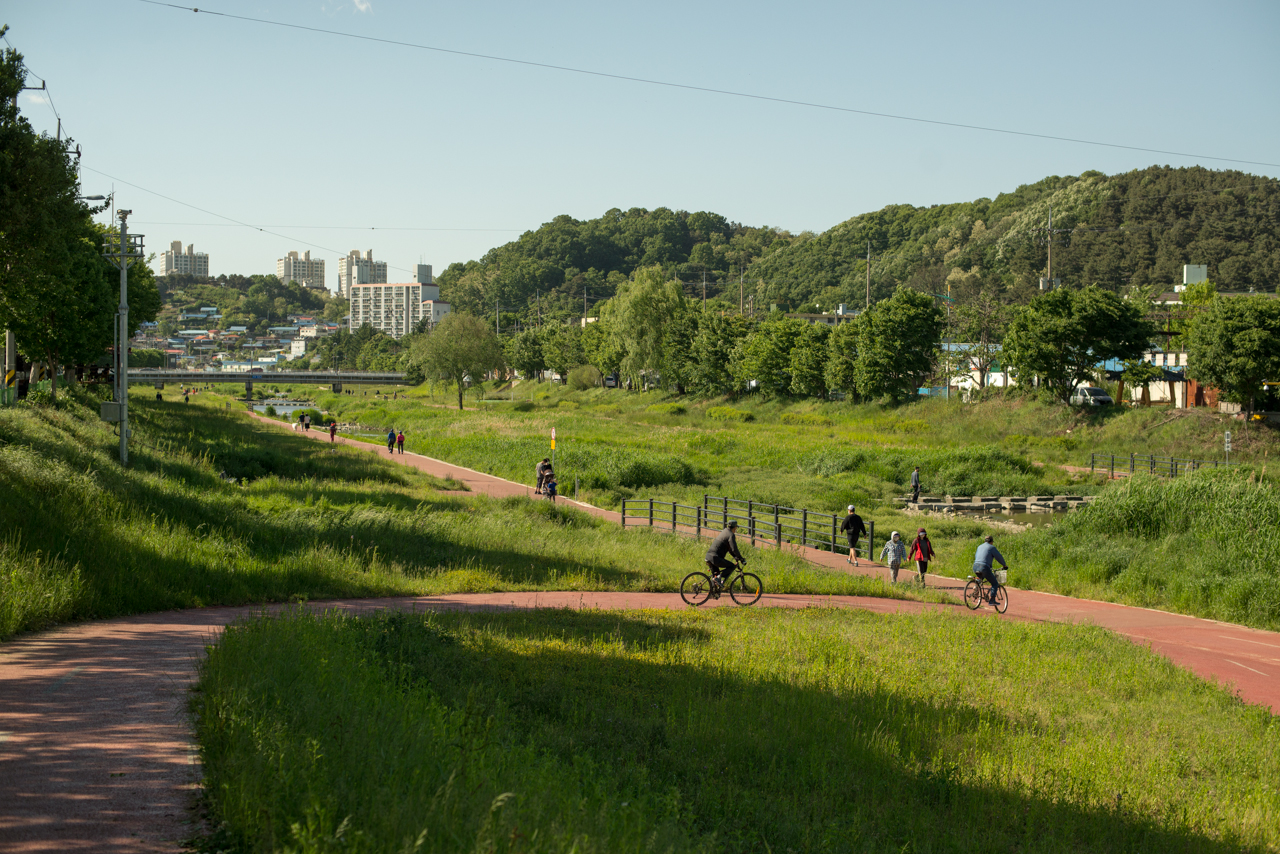
Daejeoncheon river (Daejeon)

Many local governments in South Korea are encouraging citizens to use bicycles by expanding bicycle infrastructure, implementing free bicycle insurance systems, and implementing bicycle sharing systems.

== Overview ==
According to the Road Traffic Act, bicycles are classified as vehicles, so they can share roads with cars, except for limited-access roads.

In South Korea, there are four types of bicycle roads: bicycle-only roads, which only bicycles can use; bicycle-pedestrian shared roads, bicycle-only lanes designated on the shoulder of the road; and bicycle priority roads where bicycles and cars can use the same road.

== Infrastructure ==
=== Bicycle-only road ===
bicycle-only roads are usually colored red to distinguish them from roadways, but if they are already separated by trees or curbs, they may take the form of general road paving.

According to the law, throttle-type electric bicycles that can be moved by the power of the motor without pedaling are classified as personal mobility devices, and therefore are prohibited from entering bicycle paths.

The eight-lane bike-only road between Daejeon and Sejong City in central Korea is the first central bike-only road in the country. The road is equipped with solar power generation facilities that produce 6 MW of electricity a day while blocking rain, snow, and sunlight, and there are no traffic lights or crosswalks in the middle of the road. This road was promoted along with a project to expand the 8.78 km section of four-lane road to eight lanes, and it opened in 2012. To exit this road, you must use five overpasses.

=== Bicycle priority road ===
Bicycle priority roads are shared by bicycles and vehicles, and bicycle markings are placed on the road surface at 25m intervals. Originally, the bicycle pictogram road surface guidance markings on this road were white, but since 2020, they have been painted in dark red.

=== Bicycle-pedestrian shared road ===
In 2020, the Seoul Metropolitan Government launched a project to replace the paint used to guide signs on bicycle priority lanes with semi-permanent color blocks.

=== Bicycle crossing ===
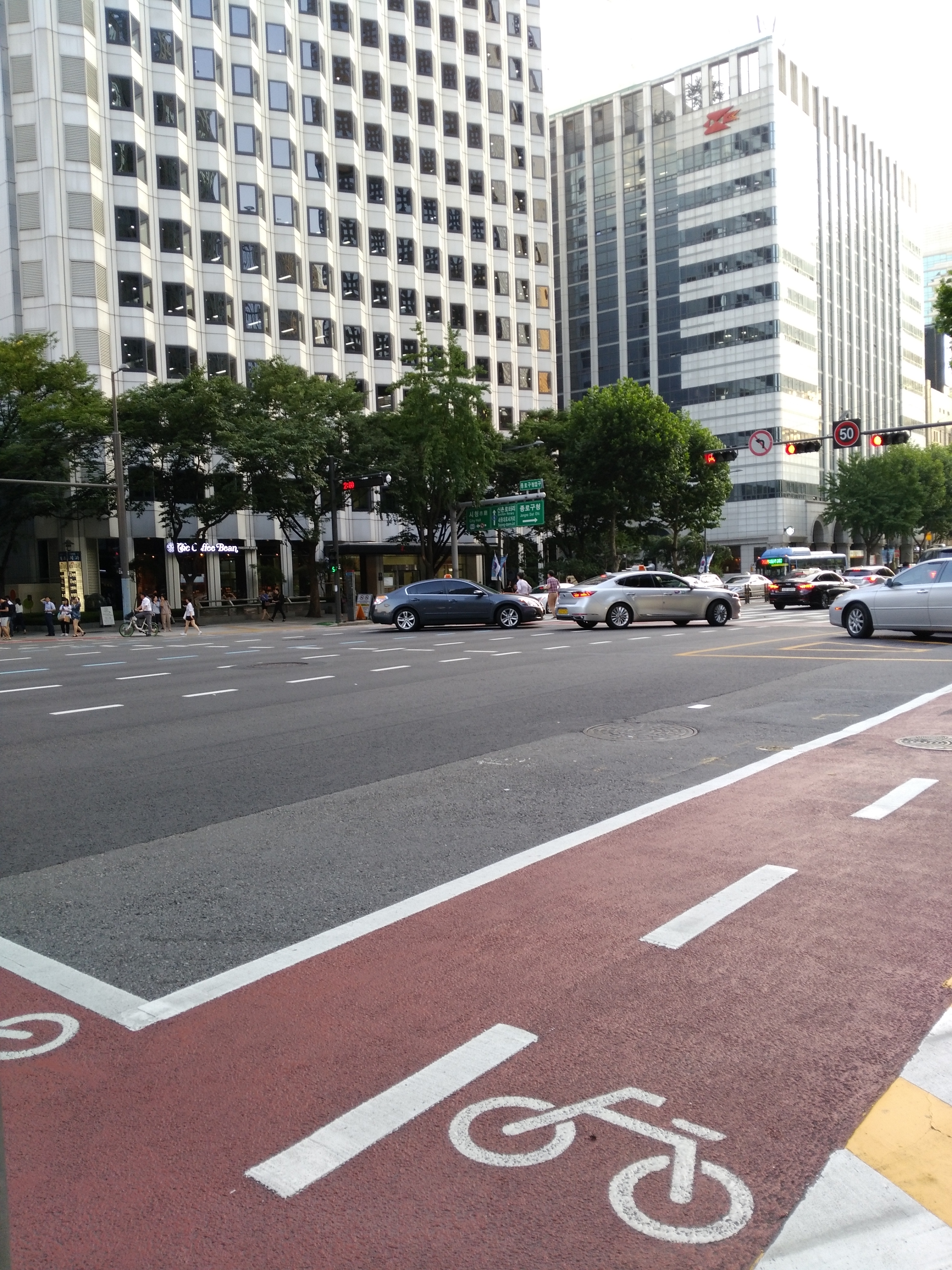
Bicycle crossing next to a crosswalk in Jongno District, Seoul

According to the Road Traffic Act, bicycles are considered vehicles, so cyclists crossing the road using a crosswalk must get off the bicycle and walk it. However, if there is a bicycle crossing next to the crosswalk, the cyclist can use the crossing without getting off. The crossing is usually in the form of a bicycle mark painted on a red pavement.

== Bike sharing system ==
Many cities have bicycle sharing systems. Goyang, Gyeonggi Province, which has a bicycle population of about 200,000, or about 20% of all citizens, introduced TAZO, a bicycle sharing service, in 2021. It is possible to use GPS to locate the bicycle without a separate stand and use it with a smartphone application.

== By region ==
=== Daejeon ===
Daejeon City declared itself a bicycle city in November 2007, and is currently pursuing policies to promote bicycle use, such as building infrastructure, operating the public bicycle service Tashu, and providing bicycle insurance for citizens.

=== Seoul ===
As of December 2023, there are 1,337 km of bicycle paths in Seoul.

=== Gyeonggi Province ===
Since 2018, Goyang City has been requiring all citizens to sign up for bicycle insurance. All citizens registered as residents of the city are automatically enrolled without any procedures, and the city is covering all insurance premiums.
