= Fancy Women Bike Ride =

Cycling tour

Fancy Women Bike Ride Süslü Kadınlar Bisiklet Turu

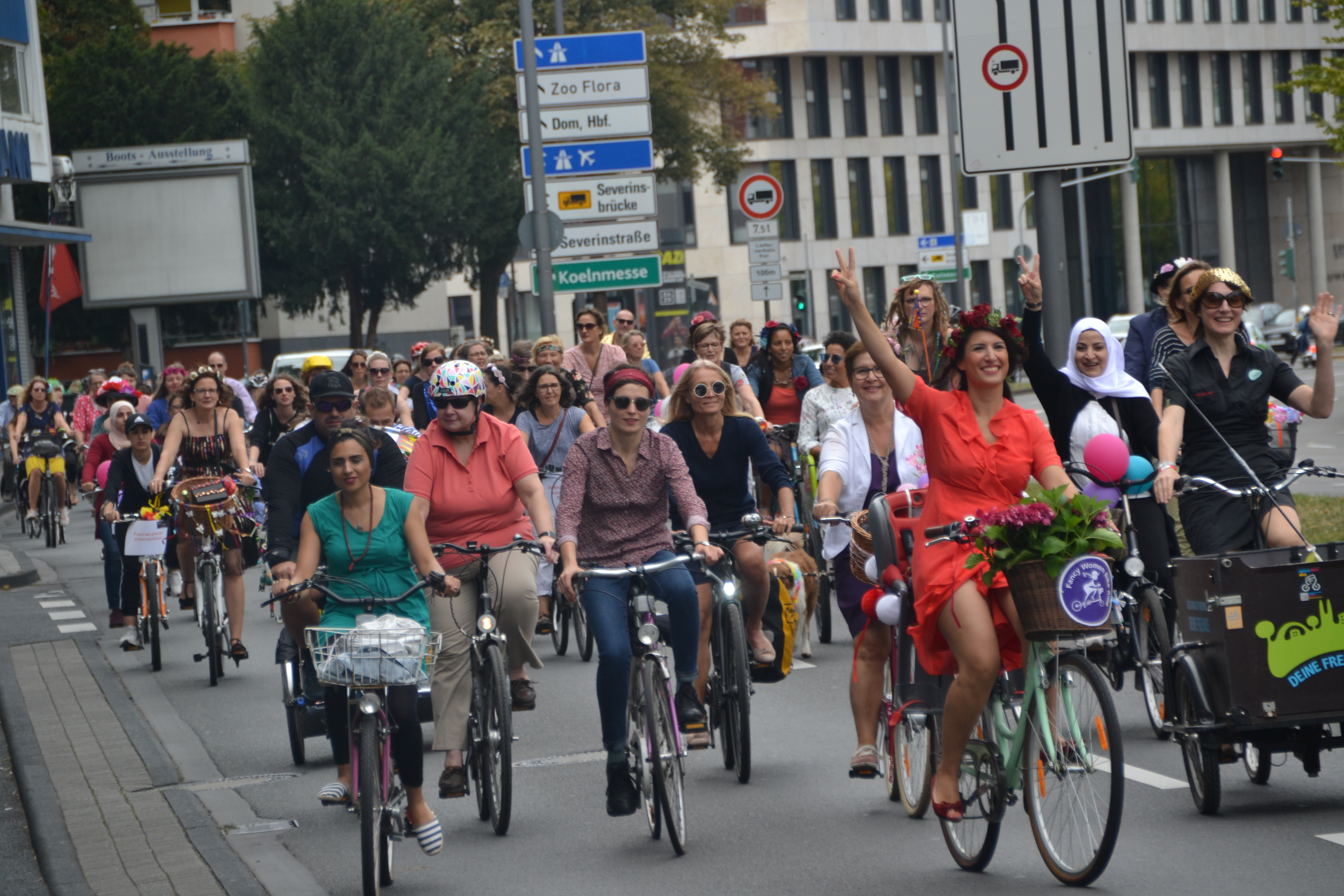
- 2019 event in Germany
- Status: Active
- Genre: Cycling tour
- Date: 2013
- Frequency: Annually
- Locations: Started in İzmir, expanded to 150+ cities
- Country: Worldwide
- Founder: Sema Gür
- Most recent: September 19, 2021
- Next event: September 17, 2023
- Website: Official English website

The Fancy Women Bike Ride was an annual event started in 2013 by history teacher Sema Gür in İzmir, Turkey. The event drew attention to the themes of freedom and women. The other coordinator of the event was Pınar Pinzuti. The events ran for 11 years and finished in 2023.

== History ==
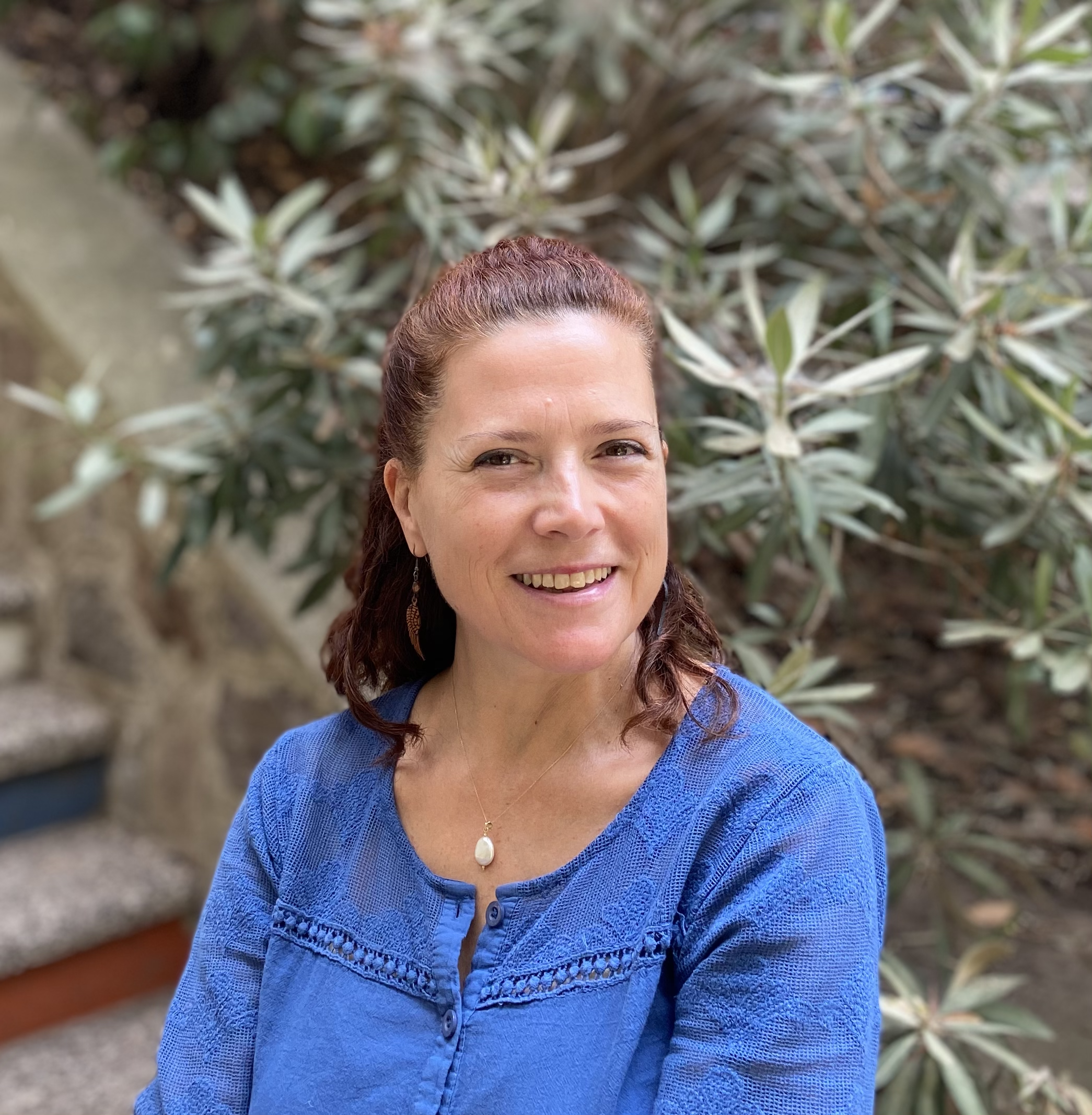
Sema Gür, founder of the tour

Sema Gür was born in 1973 in Bandırma where she lived until she began attending university. She has been involved in various social responsibility projects and won the Department of History Teaching at Dokuz Eylül University Buca Education Faculty in 1991; she graduated from in 1995. Gür started to work as a history teacher at American Collegiate Institute in 1997.

Gür learned how to ride a bicycle in 2012 and subsequently founded the Fancy Women Bike Ride as a Facebook event in 2013. Her intent was to call attention to the World Car-Free Cities Day.

In 2013, 300 women supported the first round. The women toured the center of the city dressed in elegant and fancy clothes and adorning their bicycles with flowers. At the end of the tour, they announced the press release, “Let the cities smell of perfume instead of the smell of exhaust.”

The organization, which became famous over the years, has reached many women. In 2015, tours were organized in İzmir, Istanbul, Adana, Ankara, Eskişehir, Marmaris and Bodrum. The number of cities reached 28 in 2016 and 50 in 2017.

In 2018, the event gained an international dimension. The legal existence of the bicycle tour, which is also organized in Italy, Switzerland and Germany, has been accepted by the European Union Transportation Commission. In 2019, the event was shown as one of the most successful grassroots movements in the world in Copenhagenize Index 2019. In addition, the number of cities reached 115.

In 2021, tours were organized in 25 countries and 150 cities. On November 24, 2021, the Berlin Senatorial for Environment, Transport and Climate Protection selected the tour as "Green Transport Movement of the Year".

In 2022, Sema Gür and Pınar Pinzuti were awarded with UN World Bicycle Day Award by Leszek Sibilski.

2023 saw the 11th and last event; there have been no events since September 2023.

== Gallery ==
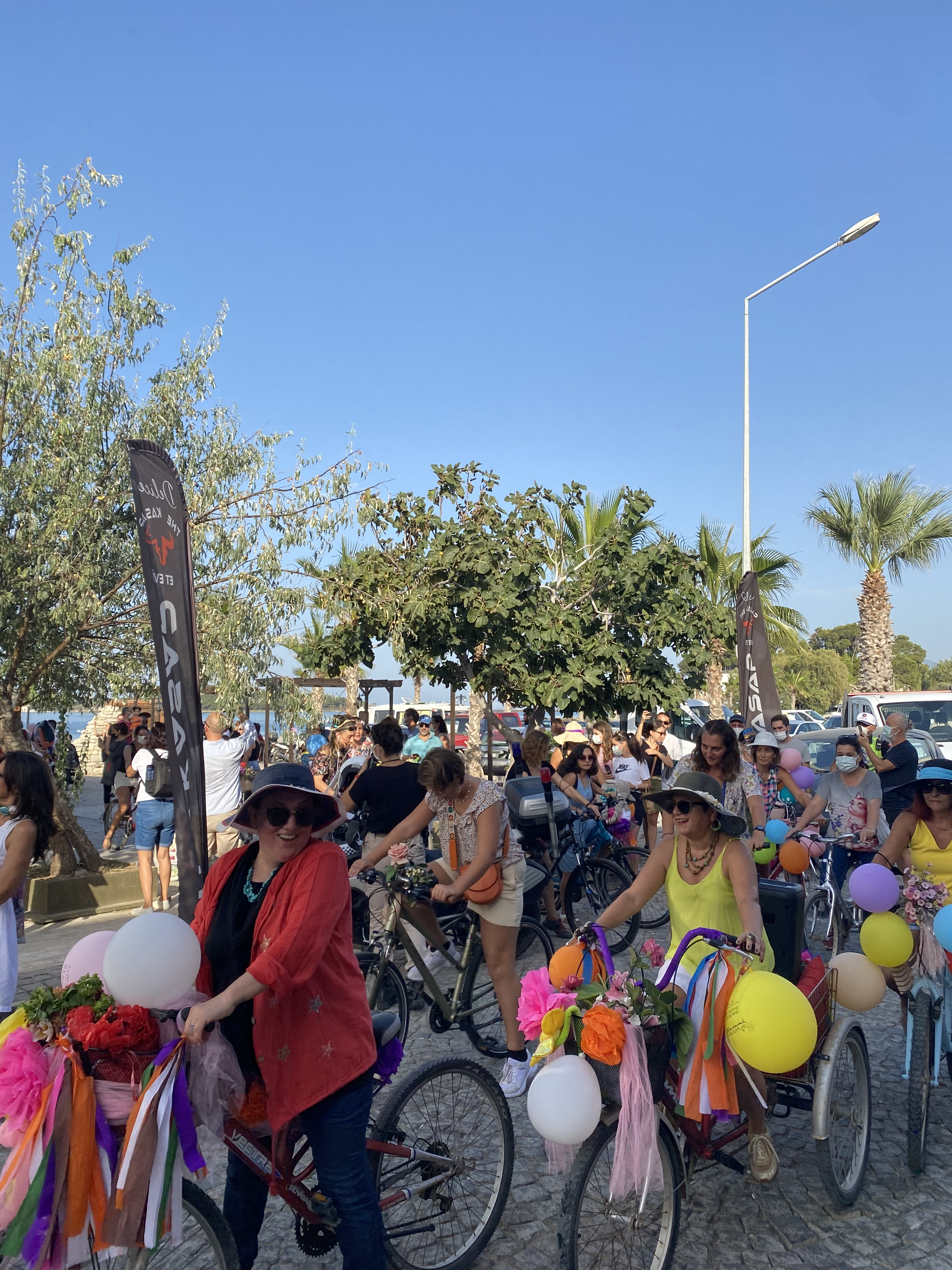
Tour organized in Urla
