= Yeşilköy, Sivrihisar =

Yeşilköy
- Neighbourhood
- Location in Turkey Yeşilköy (Turkey Central Anatolia)
- Coordinates: 39°17′53″N 31°28′39″E
- Country: Turkey
- Province: Eskişehir
- District: Sivrihisar
- Population (2022): 106
- Time zone: UTC+3 (TRT)
- Postal code: 26600
- Area code: 0222

Yeşilköy is a neighbourhood of the municipality and district of Sivrihisar, Eskişehir Province, Turkey. Its population is 106 (2022).

Formerly, the village was named "Acı Yaylası", and was subordinated to the Aşağı Kepen village. Its distance to Sivrihisar is 17 km (11 mi), and to Eskişehir 117 km (73 mi). Main economy of the village is agriculture and husbandry. The Sivrihisar Aviation Center and the M.S.Ö. Air & Space Museum in the aviation center are located just east of Yeşilköy.

== Population ==
Historical population
Year	Pop.	±% p.a.
2007	143	—
2012	121	−3.29%
2017	112	−1.53%
2022	106	−1.10%
Source: TÜIK (2007-2022)
