= Sivrihisar =

- District and municipality
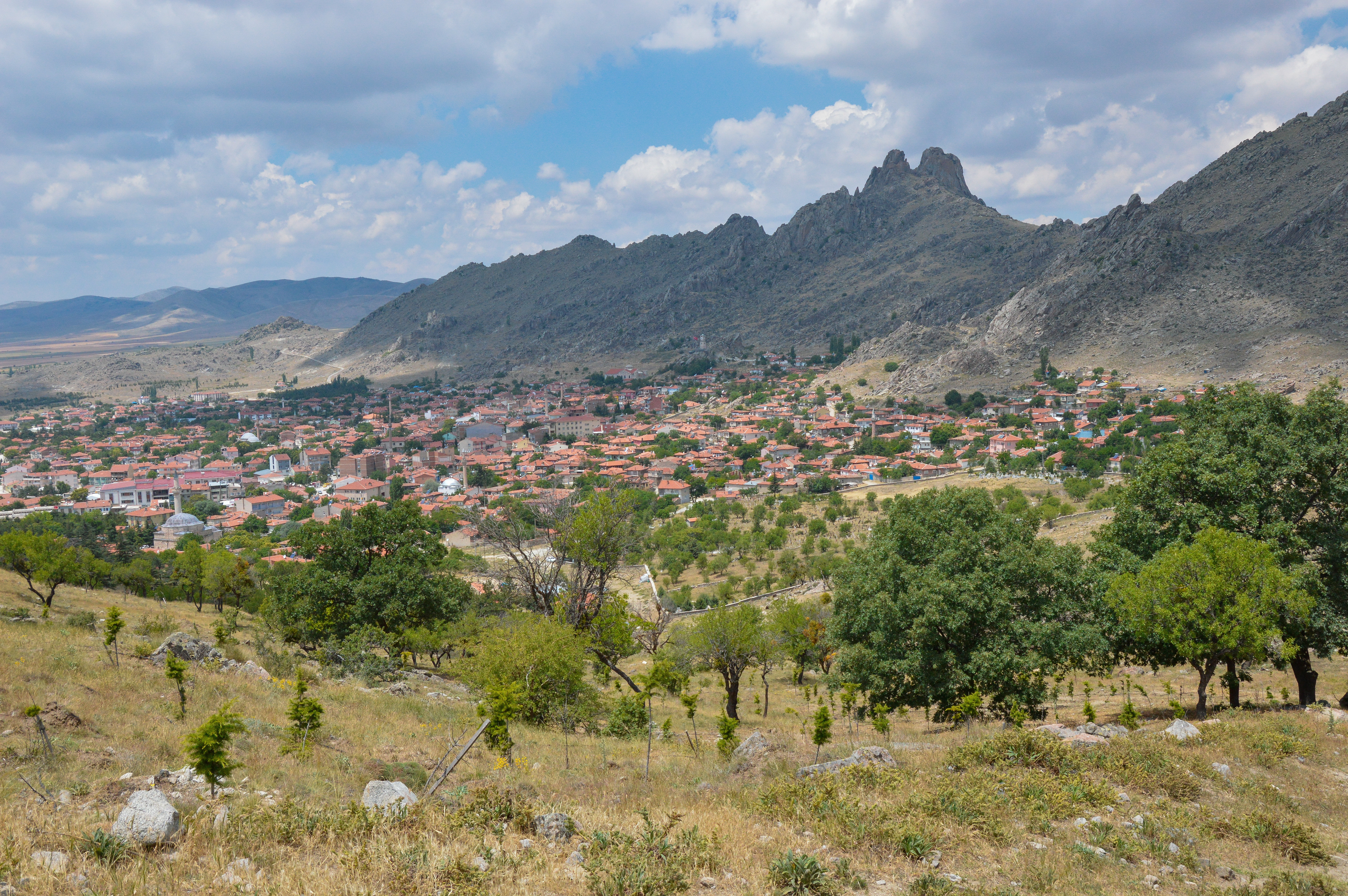
- View of the town with mountain range in the background

- Logo

- Map showing Sivrihisar District in Eskişehir Province

- Location within Turkey Location within Turkey Central Anatolia
- Coordinates: 39°27′00″N 31°32′16″E
- Country: Turkey
- Province: Eskişehir

Government
  - Mayor: Habil Dökmeci (CHP)
- Area: 2,748 km^{2} (1,061 sq mi)
- Elevation: 1,070 m (3,510 ft)
- Population (2022): 20,087
  - Density: 7.310/km^{2} (18.93/sq mi)
- Time zone: UTC+3 (TRT)
- Postal code: 26600
- Area code: 0222
- Website: www.sivrihisar.bel.tr

Sivrihisar is a municipality and district of Eskişehir Province, Turkey. Its area is 2,748 km^{2}, and its population is 20,087 (2022). Its elevation is 1,070 m (3,510 ft).

== Location ==
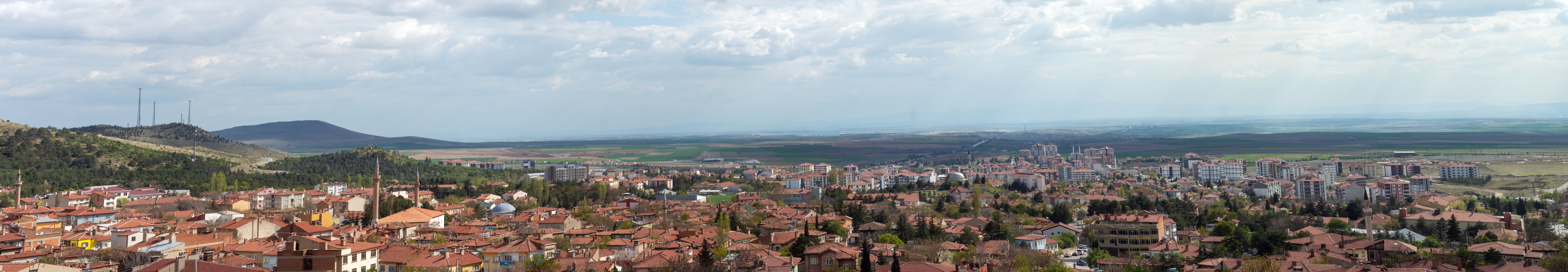
Panoramic view of Sivrihisar

The town of Sivrihisar lies 13 km (8.1 mi) north of the historical site of Pessinus, at the foot of a high double-peaked ridge of granite, which bears the ruins of ancient Spaleia and a later Byzantine castle, which gives the town its name (sivri "sharp, pointed", hisar "fortress, castle"). It is located at the interchange of the E-90 and E-96 routes.

== Economy ==
As of 1920, Sivrihisar was producing knitting clothing.

== Composition ==
There are 78 neighbourhoods in Sivrihisar District:

- Ahiler
- Aktaş
- Aşağıkepen
- Aydınlı
- Babadat
- Bahçecik
- Ballıhisar
- Benlikuyu
- Benliyaver
- Beyyazı
- Biçer
- Böğürtlen
- Buhara
- Buzluca
- Camikebir
- Çandır
- Çaykoz
- Cumhuriyet
- Demirci
- Demirciköy
- Dinek
- Dumluca
- Dümrek
- Elcik
- Elmalı
- Ertuğrulköy
- Gedik
- Gerenli
- Göktepe
- Gülçayır
- Güvemli
- Hamamkarahisar
- Hızırbey
- Hüdavendigar
- İbikseydi
- İğdecik
- İlören
- İlyaspaşa
- İstiklalbağı
- Kadıncık
- Kaldırımköy
- Karabaşlı
- Karaburhan
- Karacakaya
- Karacalar
- Karacaören
- Karacaörenyaylası
- Karadat
- Karakaya
- Karkın
- Kaymaz
- Kertek
- Kılıç
- Kınık
- Koçaş
- Koltan
- Kubbeli
- Kurşunlu
- Kurtşeyh
- Memik
- Mülkköy
- Nasrettinhoca
- Oğlakçı
- Ortaklar
- Paşakadın
- Sadıkbağı
- Sarıkavak
- Selimiye
- Sığırcık
- Tekören
- Yaverören
- Yenice
- Yenidoğan
- Yeniköy
- Yeşilköy
- Yukarıkepen
- Yunusemre
- Zeyköyü

== Notable natives ==
- Moushegh Ishkhan an Armenian poet, writer and educator.
- Nasreddin Hoca was born in Hortu village of Sivrihisar.
- Yunus Emre was born in Sivrihisar.

== Gallery ==
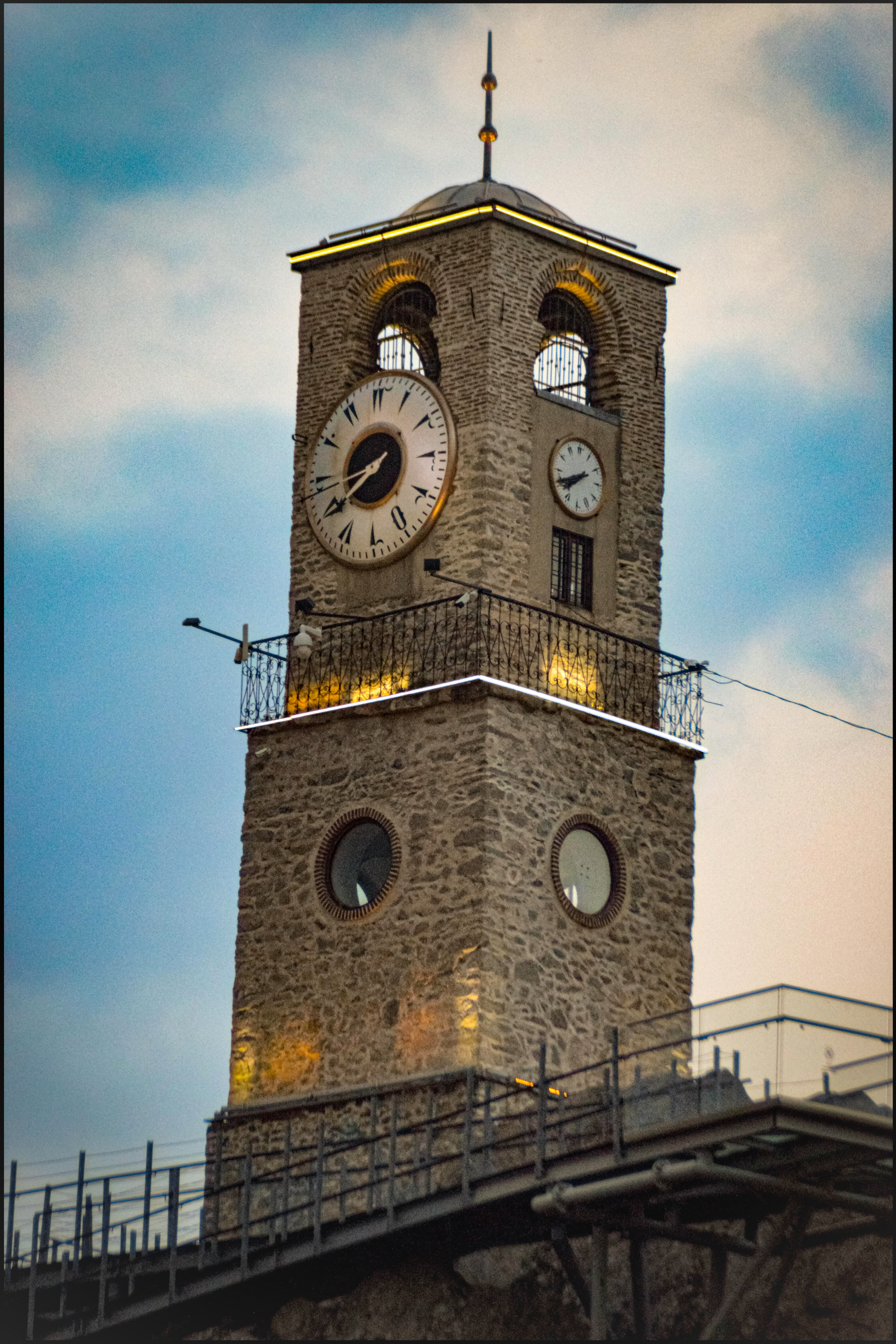
Sivrihisar Clock Tower

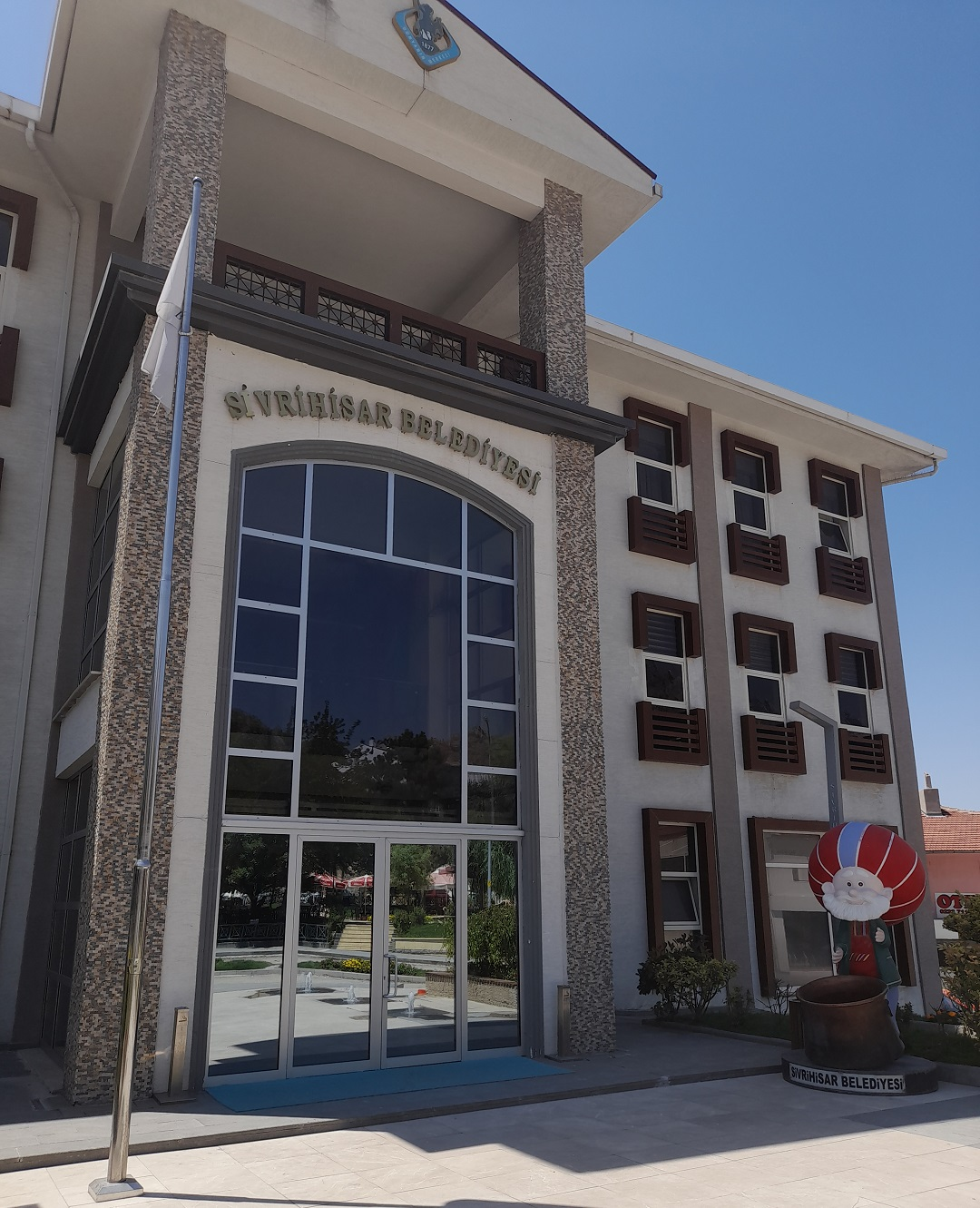
Sivrihisar Municipality Building

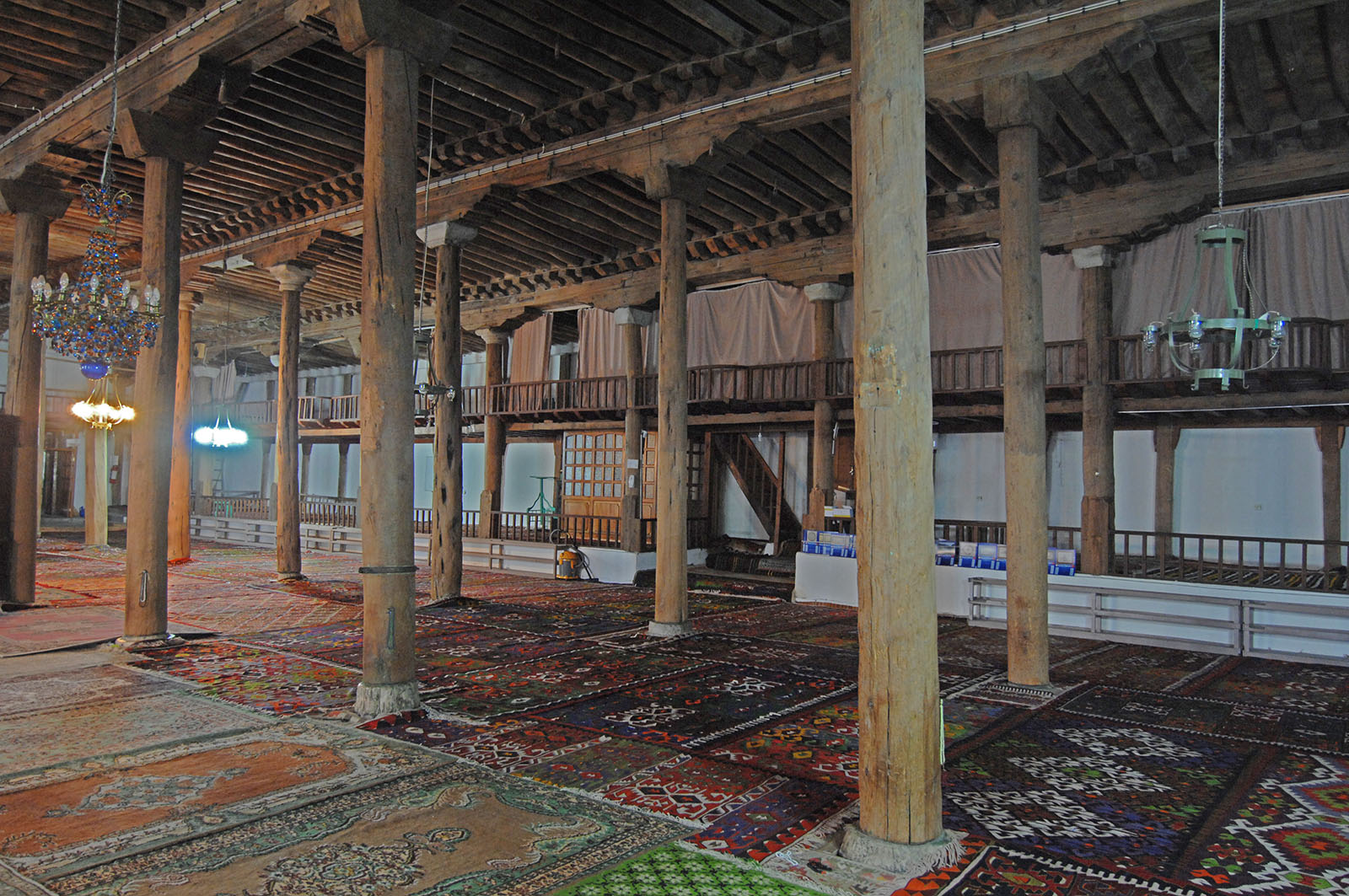
Interior of the historical Grand Mosque of Sivrihisar

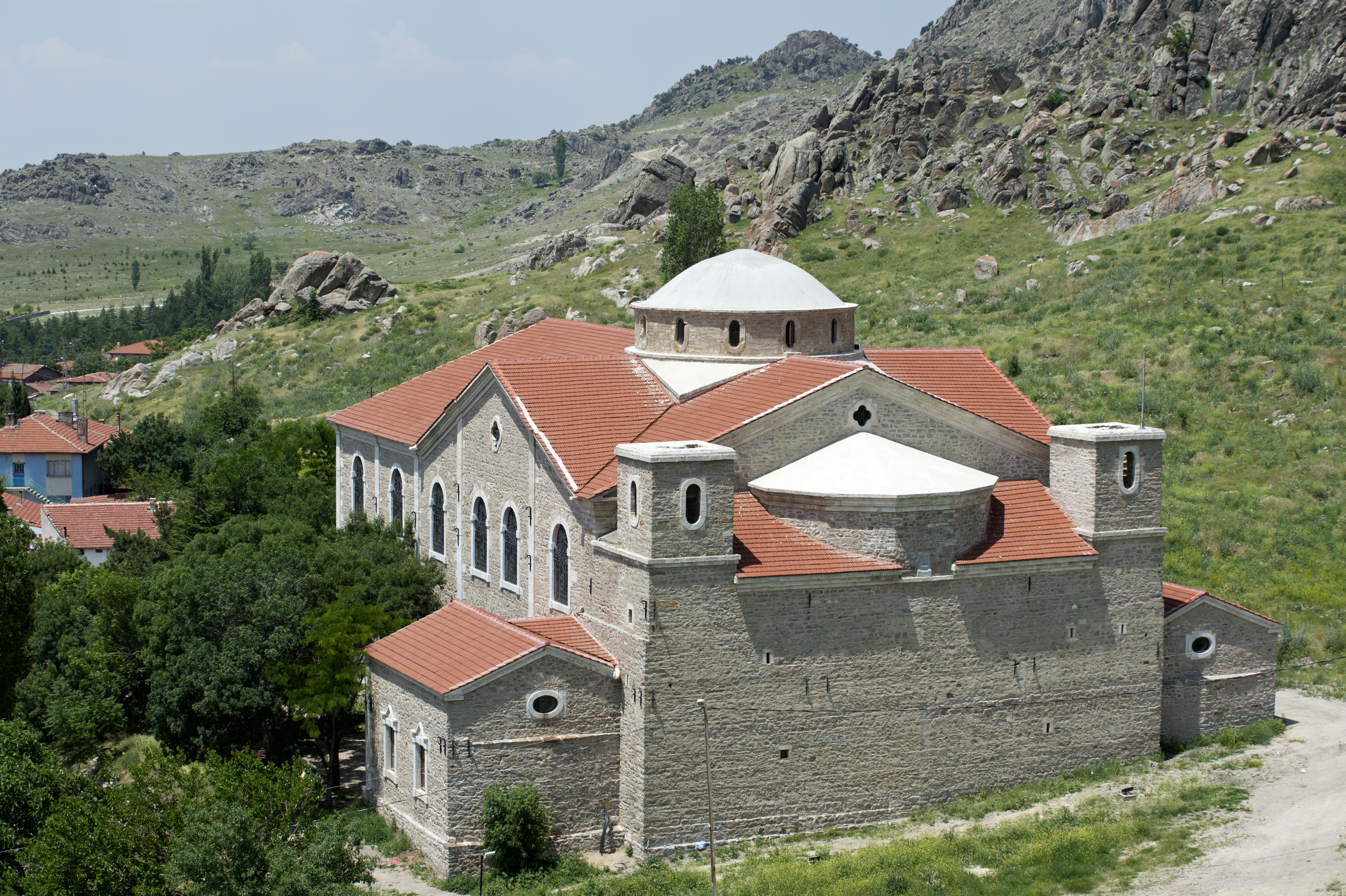
Backside view of the Holy Trinity Church, 1881

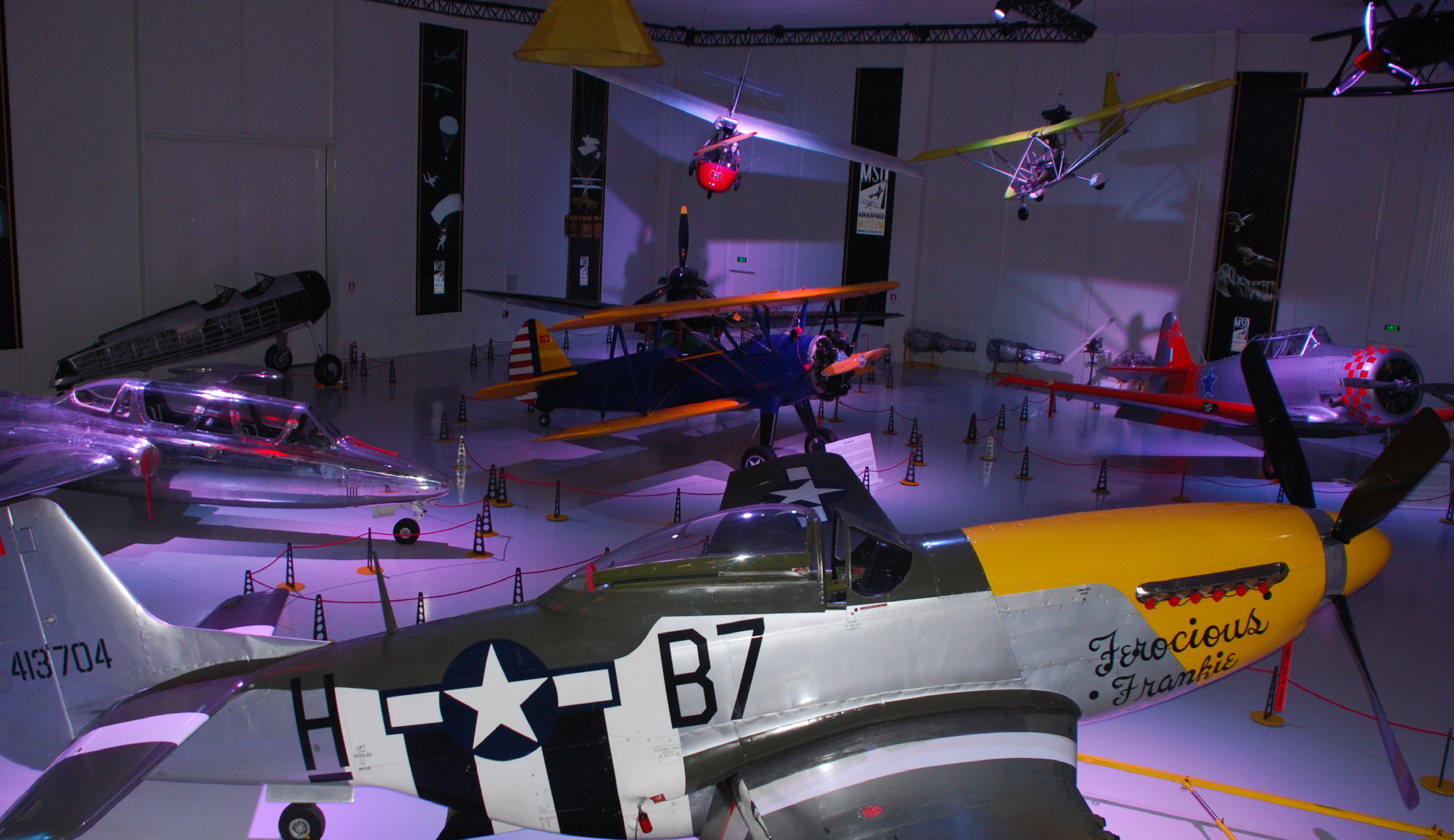
North American Aviation P-51 Mustang of the US Air Force and other airworthy aircraft on display in the M.S.Ö. Air & Space Museum

== See also ==
- Monument of Sivrihisar Airplane
- Sivrihisar Aviation Center
