= Monument of Sivrihisar Airplane =

- Sivrihisar Uçağı Anıtı
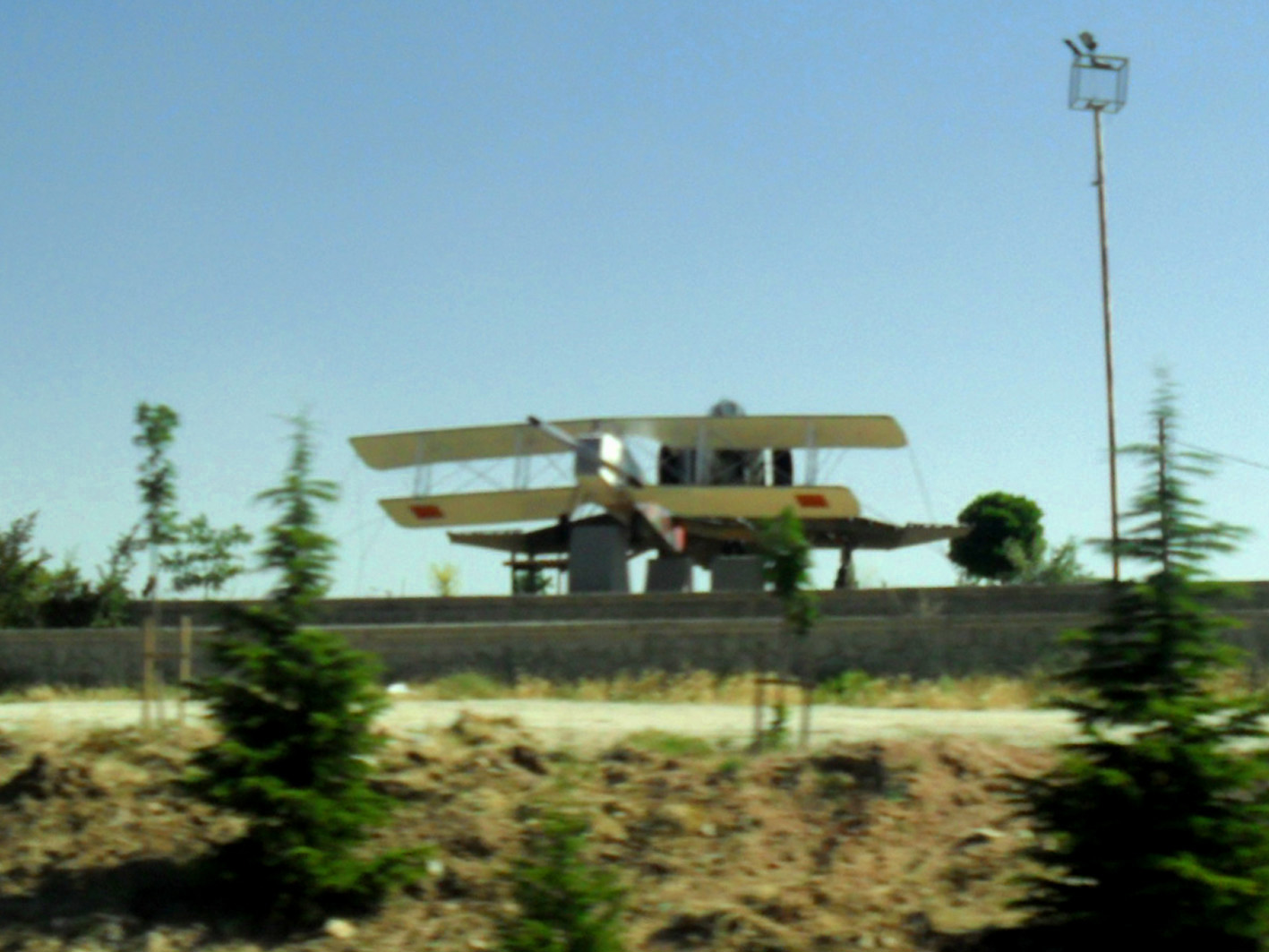
- Interactive map of Monument of Sivrihisar Airplane
- Location: Sivrihisar, Eskişehir Province, Turkey
- Coordinates: 39°26′02″N 31°32′00″E
- Type: Biplane replica
- Opening date: September 22, 2007; 18 years ago
- Dedicated to: Donation of a warplane to the Turkish military

The Monument of Sivrihisar Airplane (Turkish: Sivrihisar Uçağı Anıtı) is a monument featuring a biplane replica in Sivrihisar district of Eskişehir Province, Turkey, to commemorate the purchase of a military aircraft by the citizens of Sivrihisar, and its donation to the Turkish military during the Turkish War of Independence.

== Geography ==
The replica has been installed to the south of Turkish state highway D.200 at a point, which is close to the junction of two busy state roads to Ankara. Its distance to the town center is about 2 kilometres (1.2 mi).

== History ==
During the Turkish War of Independence, Sivrihisar was captured by the advancing Greek forces on 12 August 1921. The town later was recaptured on 20 September 1921 during the Battle of Sakarya. During the war, Turkish army had only five warplanes, which were old and not maintained. The military badly needed a new airplane. After the Turkish control was reestablished, the citizens of Sivrihisar decided to buy a new airplane to show their gratitude to the army and after a fund drive they collected TL 4,000. With this money, they bought a single-engine two-seat biplane bomber aircraft of type Breguet 14 B.2 from Breguet Aviation in France. The plane was named after the place of the donors, "Sivrihisar". This was one of the first up-to-date warplanes of the Turkish Air Force. In Atatürk’s journal of the war, there is a note "a check from Sivrihisar to Osmanlı Bankası to buy a new airplane is entrusted to Eskişehir MP Mehmet Efendi". Also Semyon Aralov, then the Soviet representative in Turkey notes that an airplane donated by the Sivrihisar citizens was flying over Sivrihisar during his visit there on 27 March 1922.

Piloted by Halim Canko, the warplane carried out the roles of reconnaissance, fighter and bomber aircraft.

== Commemoration ==
After the research of the historian Tahsin Özalp in collaboration with Turgut Özakman, it was decided to commemorate the event, and the aircraft replica was produced at the Middle East Technical University. The monument was opened on 22 September 2007.
