= Holy Trinity Church, Sivrihisar =

Armenian Apostolic temple in Eskişehir

Holy Trinity Church
- Սուրբ Երրորդություն եկեղեցի Surp Yerrortutyun Ermeni Kilisesi
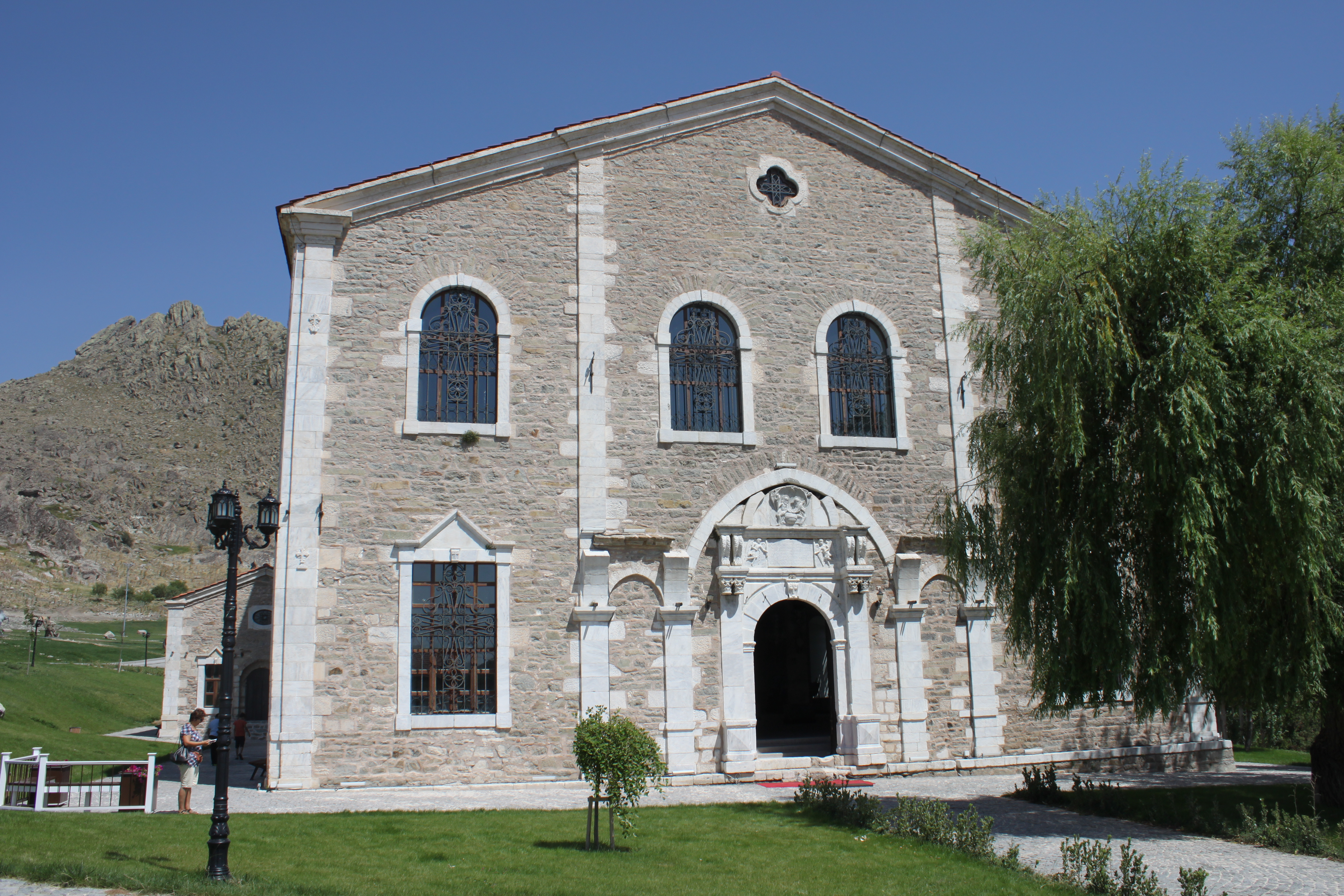
- Exterior of the church

- Location of the church in Turkey

Religion
- Affiliation: Armenian Apostolic Church

Location
- Location: Sivrihisar, Eskişehir, Turkey
- Interactive map of Holy Trinity Church
- Coordinates: 39.4535°N 31.5352°E

Architecture
- Completed: 1650

The Holy Trinity Church (Turkish: Kutsal Üçlü Ermeni Kilisesi, Armenian: Սուրբ Երրորդություն եկեղեցի) or Surp Yerrortut'yun Church is a historical Armenian Apostolic temple in the former Armenian quarter of Sivrihisar in the western Turkish province of Eskişehir. It was used as a store after the Armenians of the town had been deported and killed during the Armenian genocide. It is one of the biggest churches in Anatolia.

It was built in the year 1650 but set under fire in 1876. In 1881, the Holy Trinity Church was rebuilt by the architect Mintes Panoyat under patriarch Nerses II. After the Armenian genocide in 1915, the church stood empty. A restoration plan was given up in 2001, but reconstruction of the dome started in 2010. The church at the stage of building reopened.

The Holy Trinity Church itself is a rectangular basilica. The old frescoes and Armenian inscriptions inside the church are almost completely destroyed.

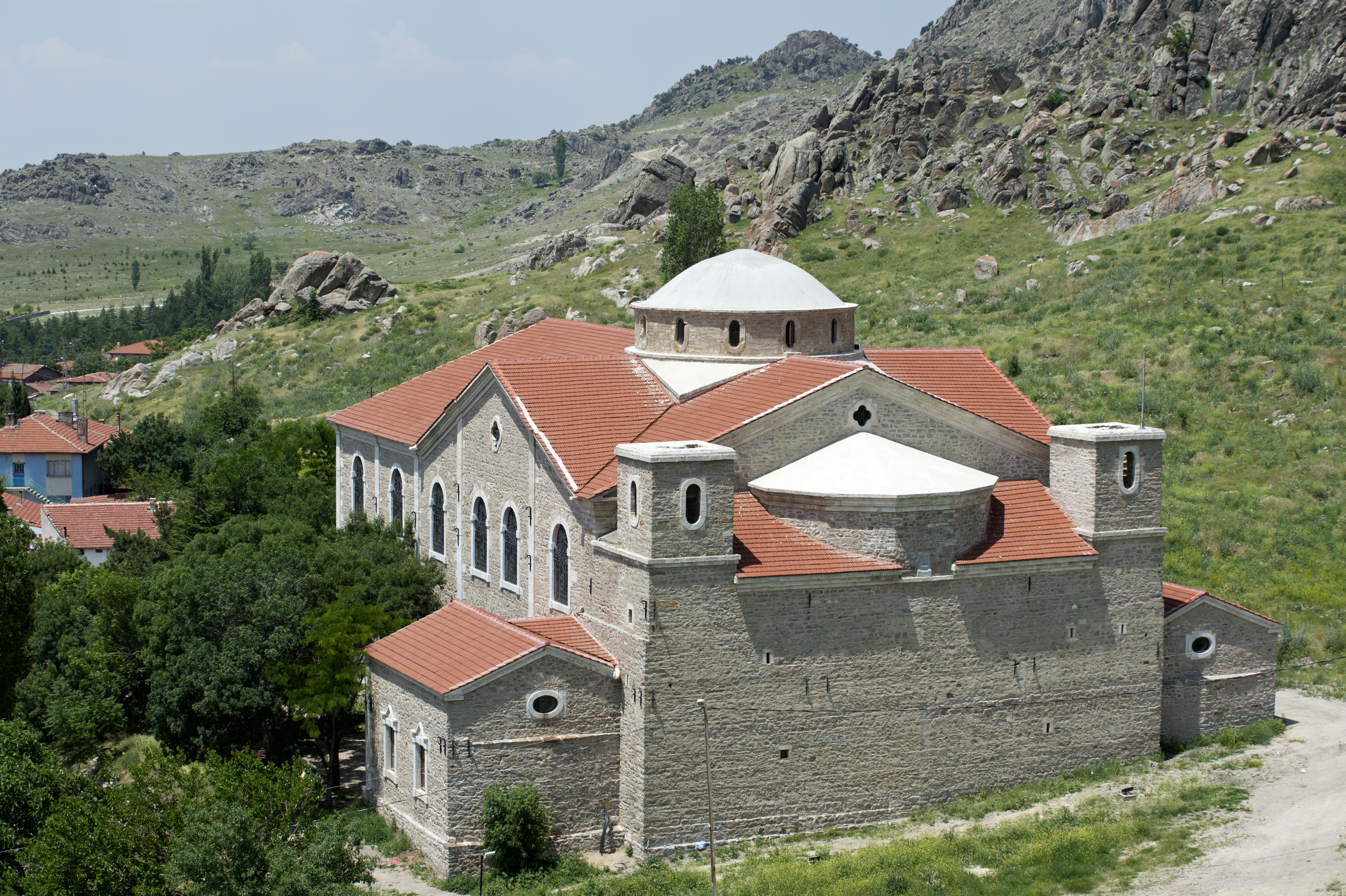
The Holy Trinity Church in Sivrihisar.

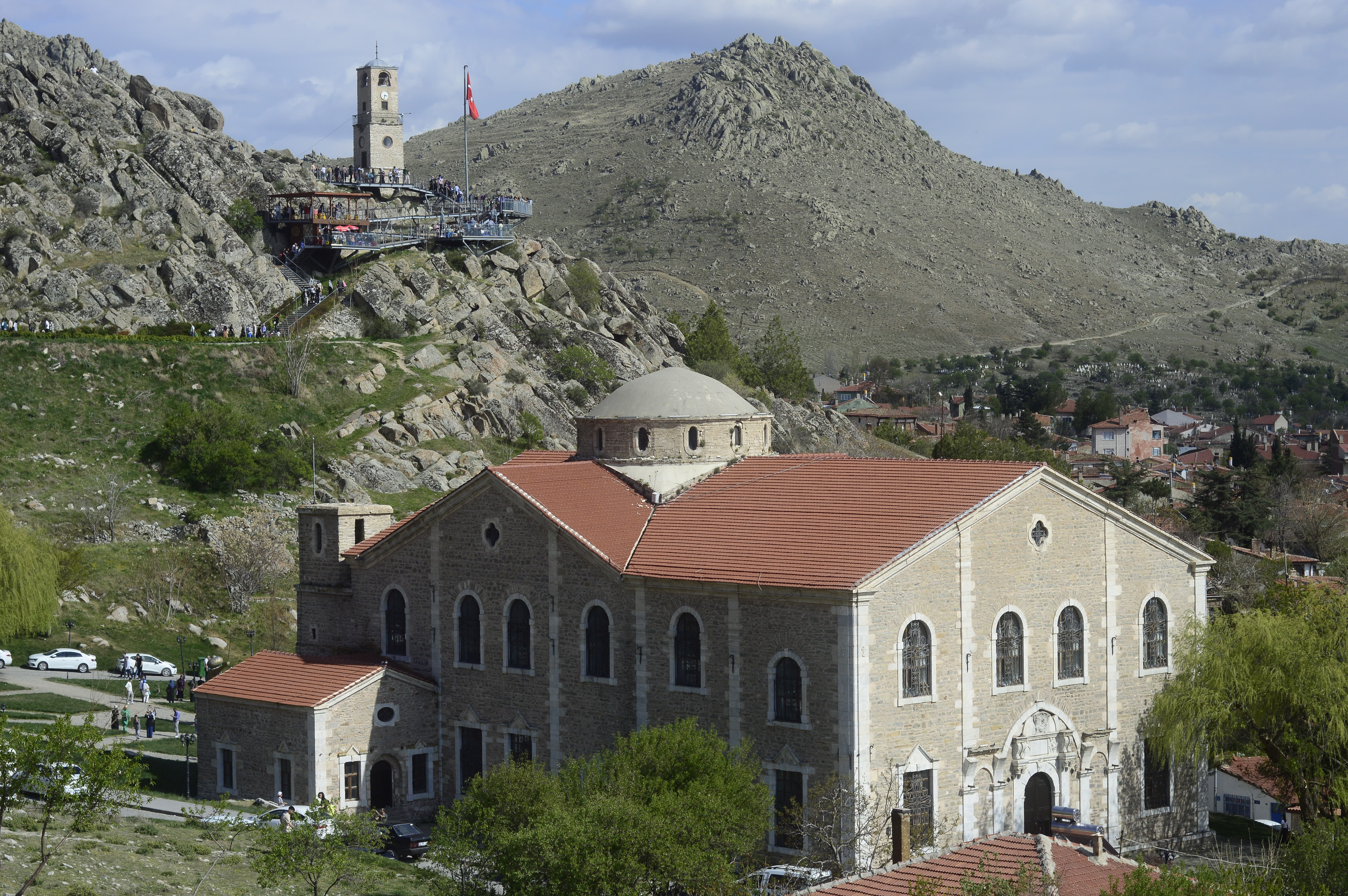
Holy Trinity Church and Sivrihisar Clock Tower in 2024

== Sources ==
- "Sivrihisar'daki Surp Yerrortutyun kilisesi açılışa hazırlanıyor" (in Turkish). (in Turkish)
