= Moushegh Ishkhan =

Armenian poet

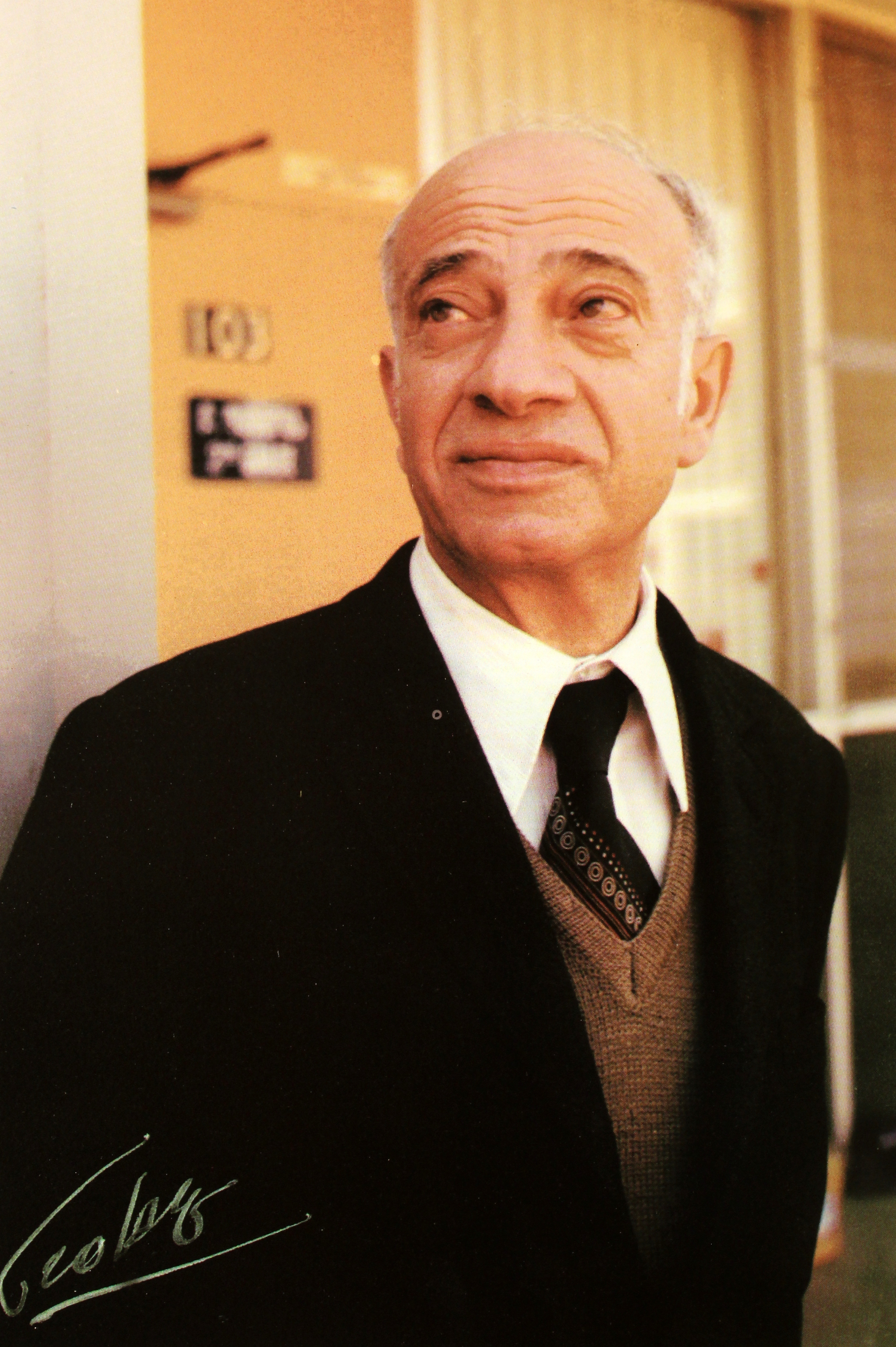
- Born: 1913; Sivrihisar, Ottoman Empire
- Died: 12 June 1990; Beirut, Lebanon
- Occupation(s): Poet, educator, and writer

Moushegh Ishkhan (Armenian: Մուշեղ Իշխան; born as Jenderejian, 1913 Sivrihisar - 12 June 1990 Beirut) was an Armenian Diasporan poet, writer and educator.

== Life and work ==
Moushegh Ishkhan was born in 1913 in Sivrihisar, a village near Ankara. Orphaned during the Armenian genocide at the age of two, Ishkhan settled in Damascus. Receiving his elementary education locally, he moved to Cyprus where he attended the Melkonian Educational Institute. After studying for two years at Melkonian, Ishkhan moved to Beirut, Lebanon in 1930 where he attended Nshan Palandjian College. After his graduation in 1935, he became a teacher for three years. His first book of poems was published in 1936. He studied at the University of Brussels since 1938, but World War II interrupted his studies and in 1940 he returned to Beirut. Upon his return, he continued teaching at Nshan Palandjian College.

He authored 17 books. He published plays, novels, and a series of textbooks on Armenian literature in addition to his well-known poetry.

Yerevan school No. 5 named after Moushegh Ishkhan also has a museum dedicated to him.

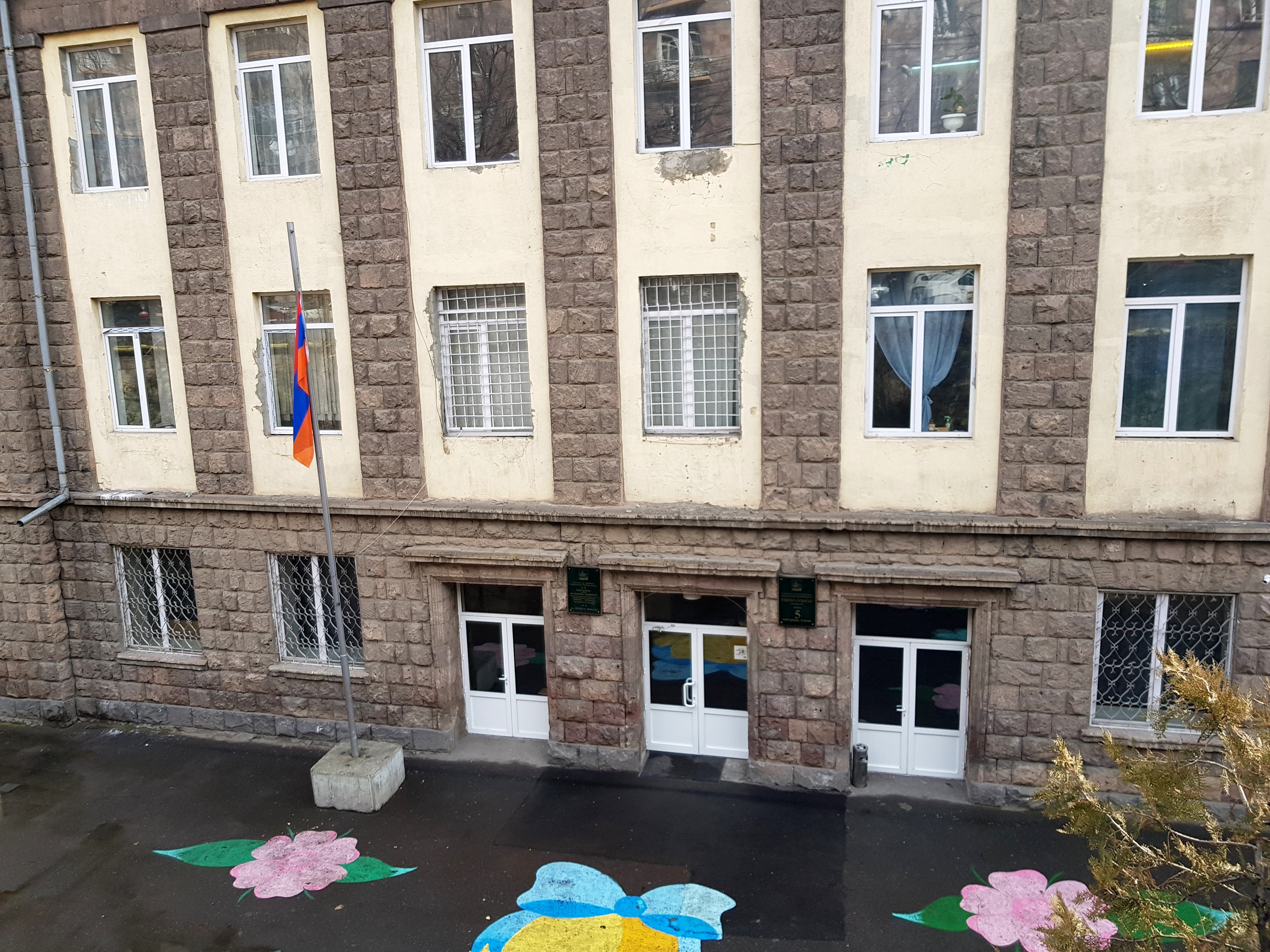
Moushegh Ishkhan School N 5, yerevan

== Poetry ==
According to Ishkhan, in the absence of territory for Armenian diaspora it is language that functions as the 'space' for imagining the nation:

"The Armenian language is the home

and haven where the wanderer can own

roof and wall and nourishment...".
