= Sivrihisar Aviation Center =

- IATA: None; ICAO: None

Summary
- Airport type: Private
- Owner: Sivrihisar Aviation Club
- Location: Yeşilköy, Sivrihisar, Eskişehir Province, Turkey
- Opened: 2014
- Elevation AMSL: 850 m (2,790 ft)
- Coordinates: 39°17′59″N 31°29′38″E
- Website: www.shm.aero

Map
- Location within Turkey

Runways
| Direction | Length | | Surface |
| Direction | ft | m | Surface |
|---|---|---|---|
| 05/23 | 5,940 | 1,810 | Asphalt |

Sivrihisar Aviation Center (Turkish: Sivrihisar Havacılık Merkezi), Necati Artan Facilities, is an airpark located at Sivrihisar district of Eskişehir Province in Turkey.

== History ==
Located in Yeşilköy neighborhood at 13 km (8.1 mi) on the D.260 southwest of Sivrihisar in Eskişehir Province, the airpark is built on nearly 100 ha (1,000,000 m^{2}) land at an elevation of 850 m (2,790 ft) AMSL. The construction was carried out in three phases. The first phase, which consisted of a 800 m (2,600 ft)-long runway, two hangars and operation buildings, was completed in 2014. The airpark became operational in March 2014. The buildings comprising the second phase (additional hangars) and the final phase, a lodging facility for 80 persons, were completed in 2015.

== Features ==
The runway, in the 05/23 direction, is now, after extension, 1,810 m (5,940 ft) long and 32 m (105 ft) wide. Beside the runway, there is a turf runway for gliders and light aircraft. The airpark features two aprons, one in the west and another one in the east. The west apron occupies 20,150 m^{2} (216,900 sq ft) concrete ground. There are hangars of various private companies, technical offices and Aeronautical Information Service. Its airport parking lot can hold seven aircraft with 11 m (36 ft) wingspan, five aircraft with 14 m (46 ft) wingspan as well as three business jets with wingspan up to 25 m (82 ft). Opened in 2018, the airpark hosts the M.S.Ö. Air & Space Museum at the west apron. Many aircraft in the museum's inventory are ready to fly. The east apron stretches over an area of 22,300 m^{2} (240,000 sq ft), where the Operations Control Center, the VIP terminal, the flight school, offices and technical hangars are situated. The east apron is reserved for air shows.

== Events ==
Events like flight training, parachuting training and aeromodelling are also held at the airpark.

The biggest event organized at the airpark is the annual SHG Airshows, which was attended by 56,000 in 2019. Other events organized include SHY Air Race, Fly-Inn, Children's Day Paper Plane Contest and Flying Villages.
