= M.S.Ö. Air & Space Museum =

Aerospace museum in Turkey

- M.S.Ö. Hava ve Uzay Müzesi
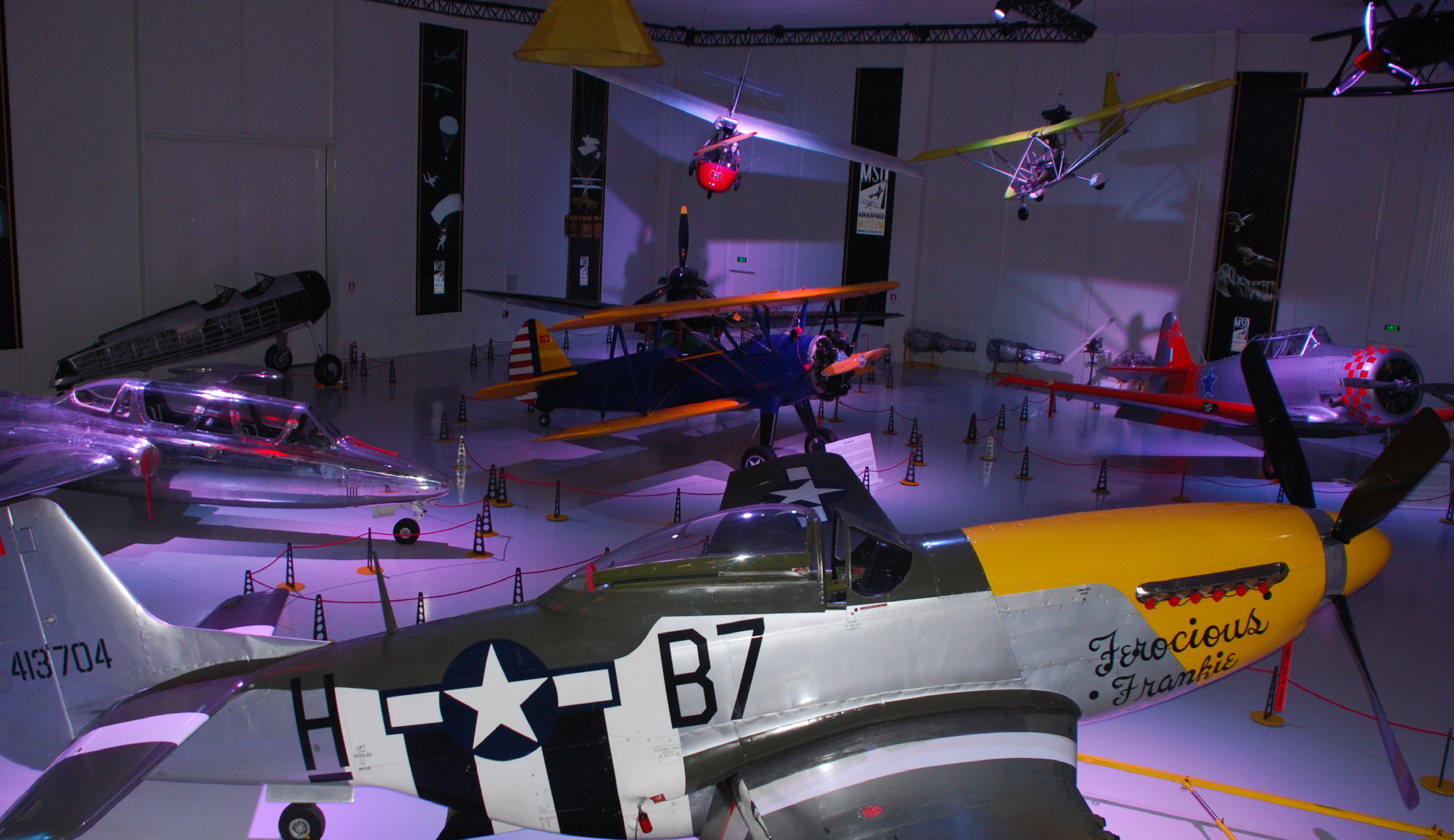
- North American P-51 Mustang in the museum.
- Established: 2018; 7 years ago
- Coordinates: 39°17′59.29″N 31°29′38.50″E
- Type: Aerospace museum
- Director: Ali İsmet Öztürk
- Website: msomuseum.com

M.S.Ö. Air and Space Museum (Turkish: M.S.Ö. Hava ve Uzay Müzesi) is located at Sivrihisar Aviation Center, Eskişehir, Turkey. The museum is open every day except Mondays. The museum has both airworthy historical aircraft and static displays.

== Museum ==
The museum is directly connected to the west apron at the Sivrihisar Aviation Center, where airworthy aircraft can leave the hangars at once and perform display flights. The main entrance of the museum is through the B gate of Sivrihisar Aviation Center. The museum building consists of four hangars and houses various exhibits ranging from engines to dioramas to aircraft. The building also houses the Aeronautical Information Service office and a museum store.

== Exhibits ==
The airworthy aircraft on display include:

- North American P-51 Mustang "Ferocious Frankie" Ser. No. 44-13704
- Douglas DC-3 "Turkish Delight" Ser. No. 2204
- Supermarine Spitfire LF Mk.IX TE517
- North American T-6 Texan "Happy Hour" Ser. No. SA079
- Boeing-Stearman Model 75
- Antonov An-2 Ser. No. 17805
- Cessna 195

The museum also hosts aviation-related events, for example, the Women and World Aviation Symposium planned for March 2020.

== See also ==
- List of aerospace museums
- List of surviving North American P-51 Mustangs
- List of surviving Supermarine Spitfires
