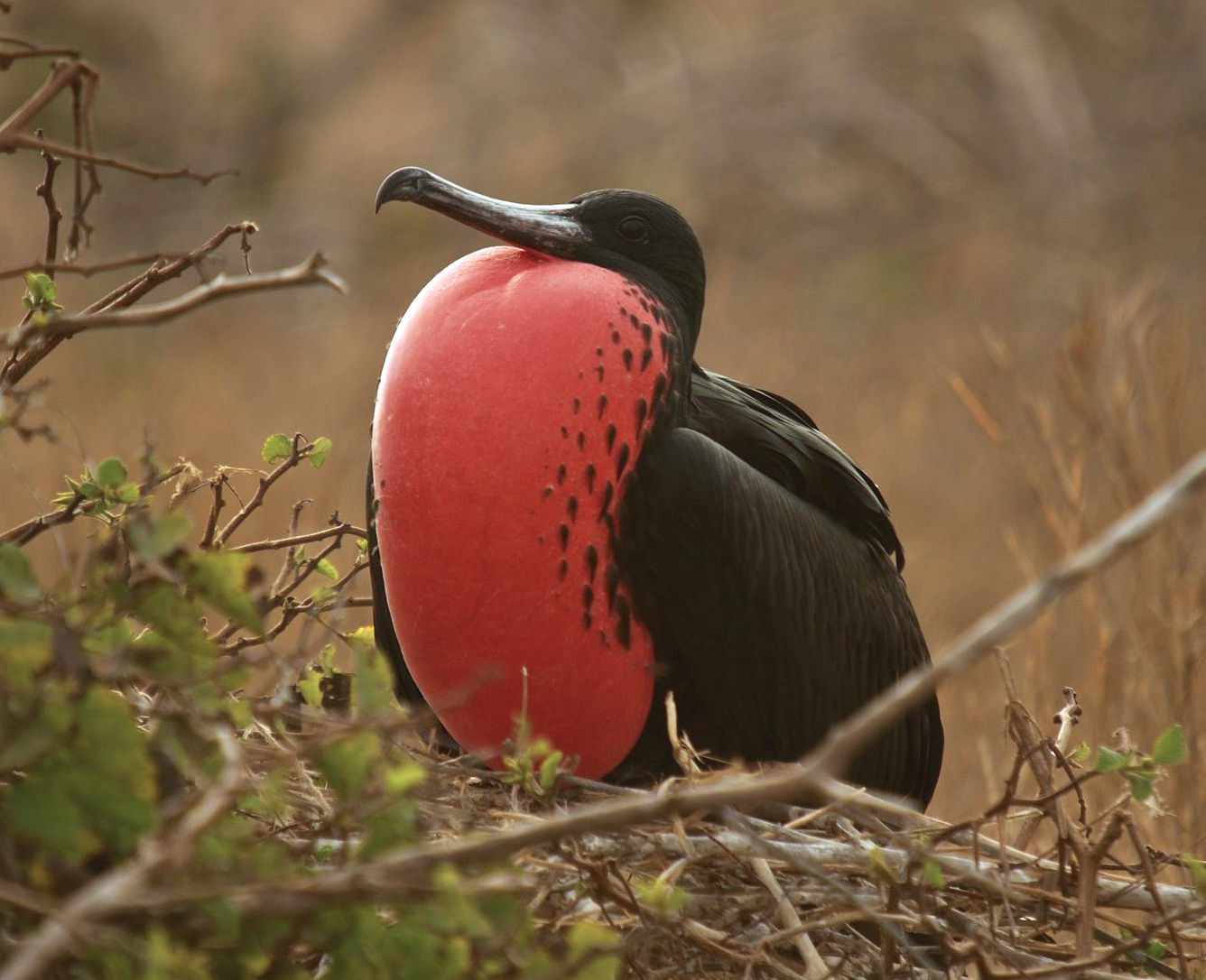
- Male Fregata magnificens magnificens with inflated gular sac, Española, Galápagos
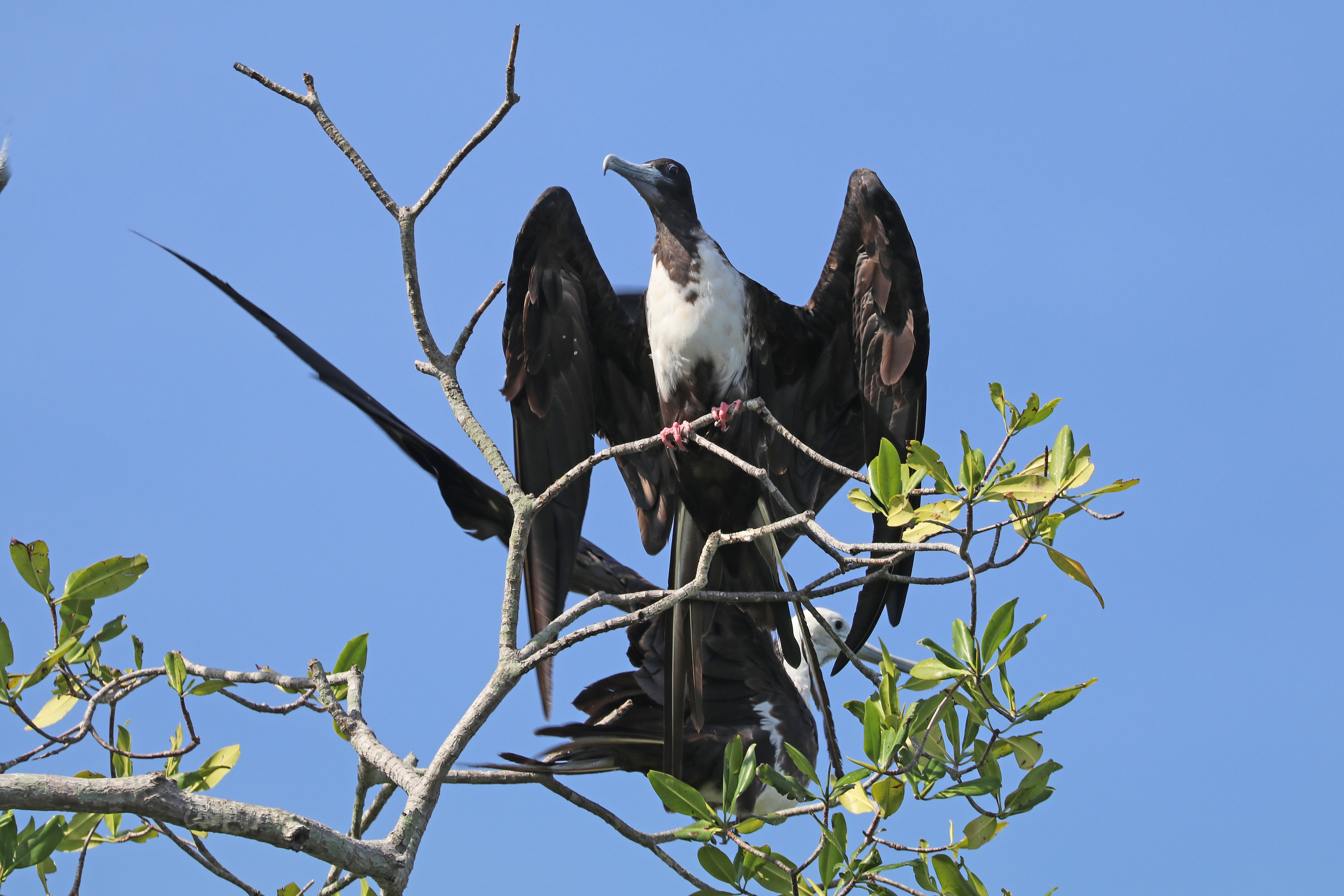
- Female Fregata magnificens rothschildi, Panama

Conservation status
- Least Concern (IUCN 3.1)

Scientific classification
- Kingdom: Animalia
- Phylum: Chordata
- Class: Aves
- Order: Suliformes
- Family: Fregatidae
- Genus: Fregata
- Species: F. magnificens

Binomial name
- Fregata magnificens Mathews, 1914

Subspecies
- F. m. magnificens Mathews, 1914; F. m. rothschildi Mathews, 1915
- Range map

= Magnificent frigatebird =

Species of bird

The magnificent frigatebird (Fregata magnificens), frigate petrel or man o' war is a seabird of the frigatebird family Fregatidae. With a length of 89–114 centimetres (2 ft 11 in – 3 ft 9 in) and wingspan of 2.17–2.44 m (7 ft 1 in – 8 ft 0 in), it is the largest species of frigatebird. It occurs over tropical and subtropical waters off America, between northern Mexico and Peru on the Pacific coast and between Florida and southern Brazil along the Atlantic coast. There are also populations on the Galápagos Islands in the Pacific and the Cape Verde islands in the Atlantic. It is one of the fastest birds in the world, flying at speeds of up to 153 kilometres (95 mi) per hour.

The magnificent frigatebird is a large, lightly built seabird with brownish-black plumage, long narrow wings and a deeply forked tail. The male has a striking red gular sac which he inflates to attract a mate. The female is slightly larger than the male and has a white breast and belly. Frigatebirds feed on fish taken in flight from the ocean's surface (often flying fish), and sometimes indulge in kleptoparasitism, harassing other birds to force them to regurgitate their food.

== Taxonomy ==
The magnificent frigatebird was originally considered to belong to the species Fregata aquila but in 1914 the Australian ornithologist Gregory Mathews proposed that the magnificent frigatebird should be considered as a separate species with the binomial name Fregata magnificens. Of the four other species within the genus Fregata, genetic analysis has shown that the magnificent frigatebird is most closely related to the Ascension frigatebird (Fregata aquila).

There are two subspecies:

- F. m. magnificens - breeds on the Galápagos Islands
- F. m. rothschildi - breeds on islands off the Pacific coast of Mexico and Central America, the tropical Atlantic from Florida south to Brazil, and on the Cape Verde islands (where almost extirpated)

Prior to 2022, both these subspecies were considered synonymous with one another and grouped under F. m. magnificens. However, they were split by the International Ornithological Congress in 2022 based on a 2011 study which examined genetic and morphological variation in magnificent frigatebirds, finding both expected and also highly unexpected results. As predicted by the flight capacity of the species, the authors found signatures of high gene flow across most of the distribution range. This included evidence of recent gene flow among Pacific and Atlantic localities, likely across the Isthmus of Panama. This geological formation is a strong barrier to movement in most tropical seabirds. However, the same study also found that the magnificent frigatebird on the Galápagos Islands is genetically and morphologically distinct. Based on this study, the Galápagos population has not been exchanging any genes with their mainland counterparts for several hundred thousand years.

== History and etymology ==
Christopher Columbus encountered magnificent frigatebirds when passing the Cape Verde Islands on his first voyage across the Atlantic in 1492. His journal for the voyage survives in a version made in the 1530s by Bartolomé de las Casas. The entry for 29 September reads in English:

They saw a bird that is called a frigatebird, which makes the boobies throw up what they eat in order to eat it herself, and she does not sustain herself on anything else. It is a seabird, but does not alight on the sea nor depart from land 20 leagues [97 km; 60 mi]. There are many of these on the islands of Cape Verde.

In the 15th century text the name of the bird is written as rabiforçado. The modern Spanish word for a frigatebird is rabihorcado or "forked tail". A population of magnificent frigatebirds once bred on the Cape Verde Islands but is now probably extinct.

The word frigatebird derives from the French mariners' name for the bird La Frégate - a frigate or fast warship. The etymology of the name was given by French naturalist Jean-Baptiste du Tertre when describing the magnificent frigatebird in 1667. (Note: Du Tertre wrote: "Loyseau que les habitans des Indes appellent Fregate (à cause de la vistesse de son vol) n'a pas le corp plus gros qu'une poule ...".) English mariners referred to frigatebirds as Man-of-War birds. This name was used by the English explorer William Dampier in his book An Account of a New Voyage Around the World published in 1697:

The Man-of-War (as it is called by the English) is about the bigness of a Kite, and in shape like it, but black; and the neck is red. It lives on Fish yet never lights on the water, but soars aloft like a Kite, and when it sees its prey, it flys down head foremost to the Waters edge, very swiftly takes its prey out of the Sea with his Bill, and immediately mounts again as swiftly; never touching the Water with his Bill. His Wings are very long; his feet are like other Land-fowl, and he builds on Trees, where he finds any; but where they are wanting on the ground.

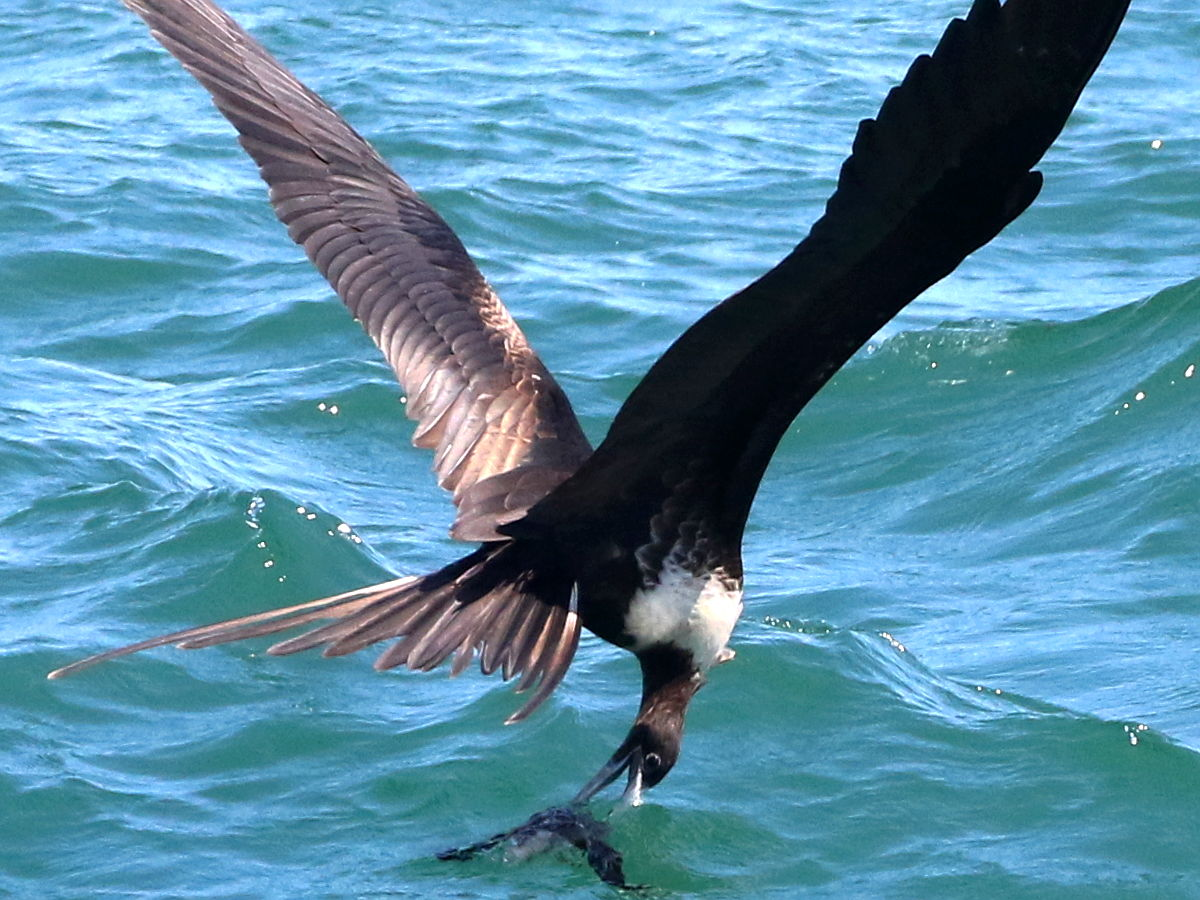
Female fishing off Copacabana beach, Brazil

The modern name Frigate Bird was used in 1738 by the English naturalist and illustrator Eleazar Albin in his A Natural History of the Birds. The book included an illustration of the male bird showing the red gular pouch. Like the genus name, the English term is derived from the French mariners' name for the bird la frégate—a frigate or fast warship.

The genus name, Fregata has the same source as the English term, and magnificens is Latin for "splendidly", from magnificus, "grand".

== Distribution ==
The magnificent frigatebird is widespread in the tropical Atlantic, breeding colonially in trees in Florida, the Caribbean and also along the Pacific coast of the Americas from Mexico to Ecuador, including the Galápagos Islands. One of the largest colonies in the world is located in Codrington Lagoon, Barbuda.

It has occurred as a vagrant as far from its normal range as the Isle of Man, Denmark, Spain, England, Nova Scotia, the Magdalen Islands, and British Columbia.

== Description ==
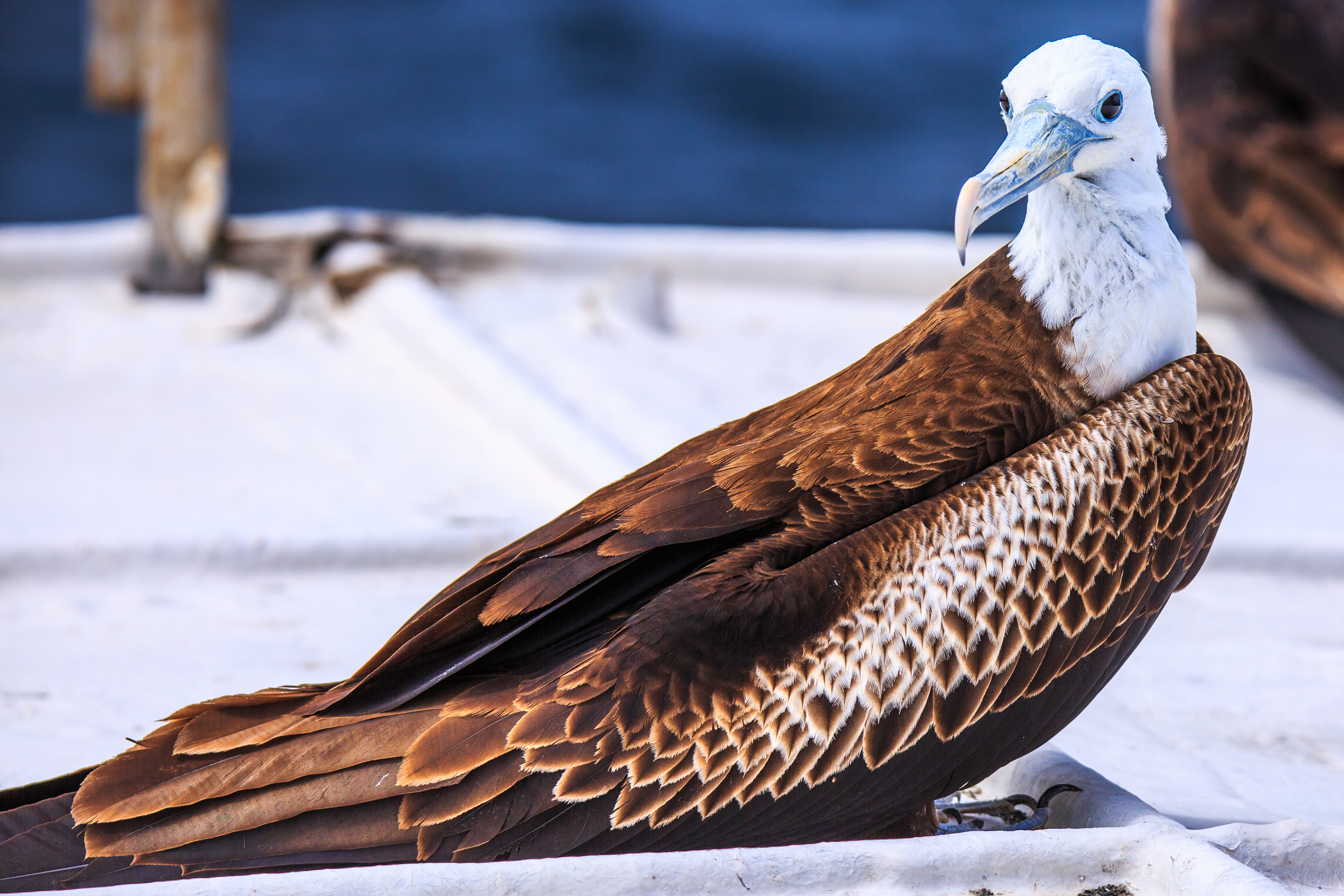
Female juvenile

The magnificent frigatebird is the largest species of frigatebird. It measures 89–114 cm (2 ft 11 in – 3 ft 9 in) in length, has a wingspan of 2.17–2.44 m (7 ft 1 in – 8 ft 0 in) and weighs 1.1–1.59 kilograms (2 lb 7 oz – 3 lb 8 oz). Males are all-black with a scarlet throat pouch that is inflated like a balloon in the breeding season. Although the feathers are black, the scapular feathers produce a purple iridescence when they reflect sunlight, in contrast to the male great frigatebird's green sheen. Females are black but have a white breast and lower neck sides, a brown band on the wings, and a blue eye-ring that is diagnostic of the female of the species. Immature birds have a white head and underparts.

This species is very similar to the other frigatebirds and is similarly sized to all but the lesser frigatebird. However, it lacks a white axillary spur, and juveniles show a distinctive diamond-shaped belly patch. The magnificent frigatebird is silent in flight, but makes various rattling sounds at its nest.

It spends days and nights on the wing, with an average flapping rate of 2.84 beat per second, ground speed of 10 km/h (6.2 mph), covering up to 223 km (139 mi) before landing. They alternately climb in thermals, to altitudes occasionally as high as 2,500 m (8,200 ft), and descend to near the sea surface.

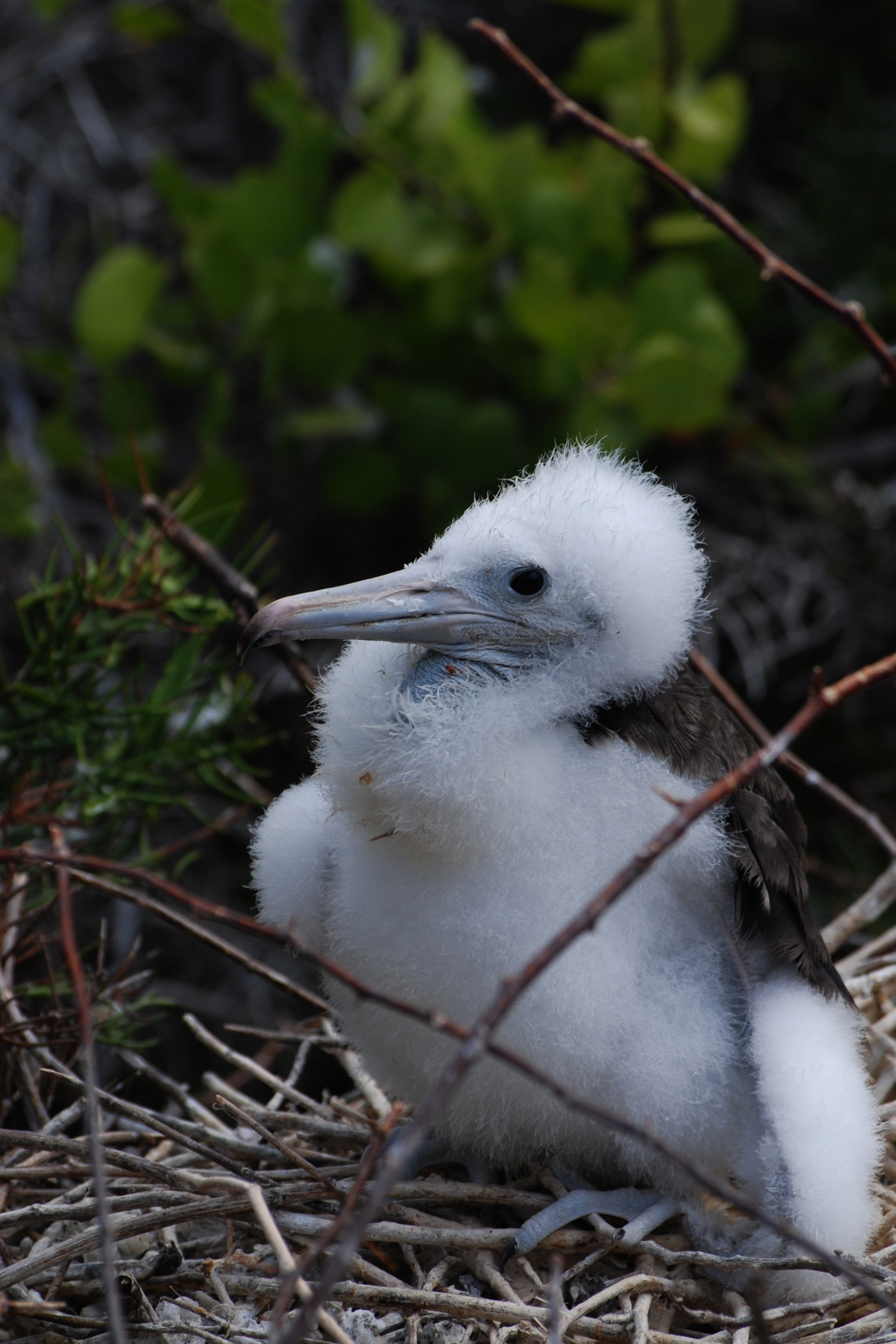
Chick on a nest

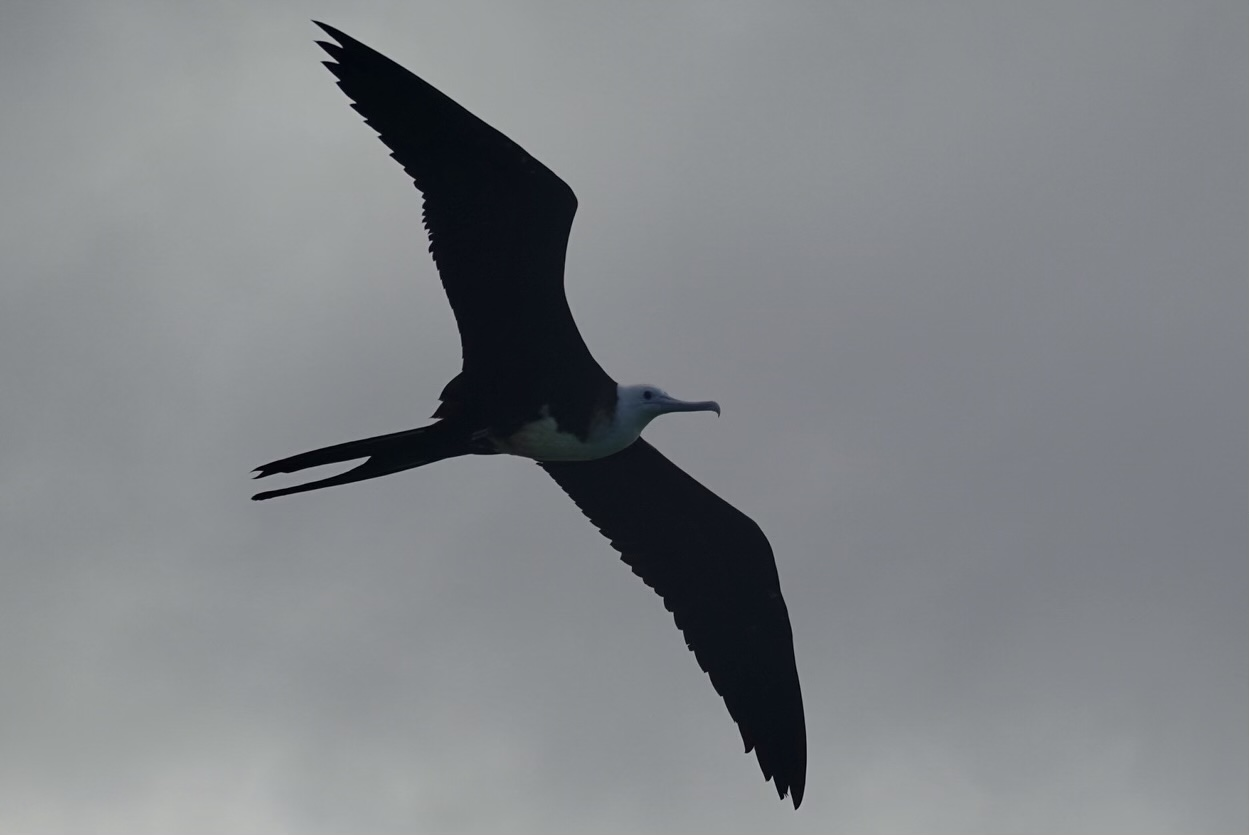
Juvenile Above Isla Isabela

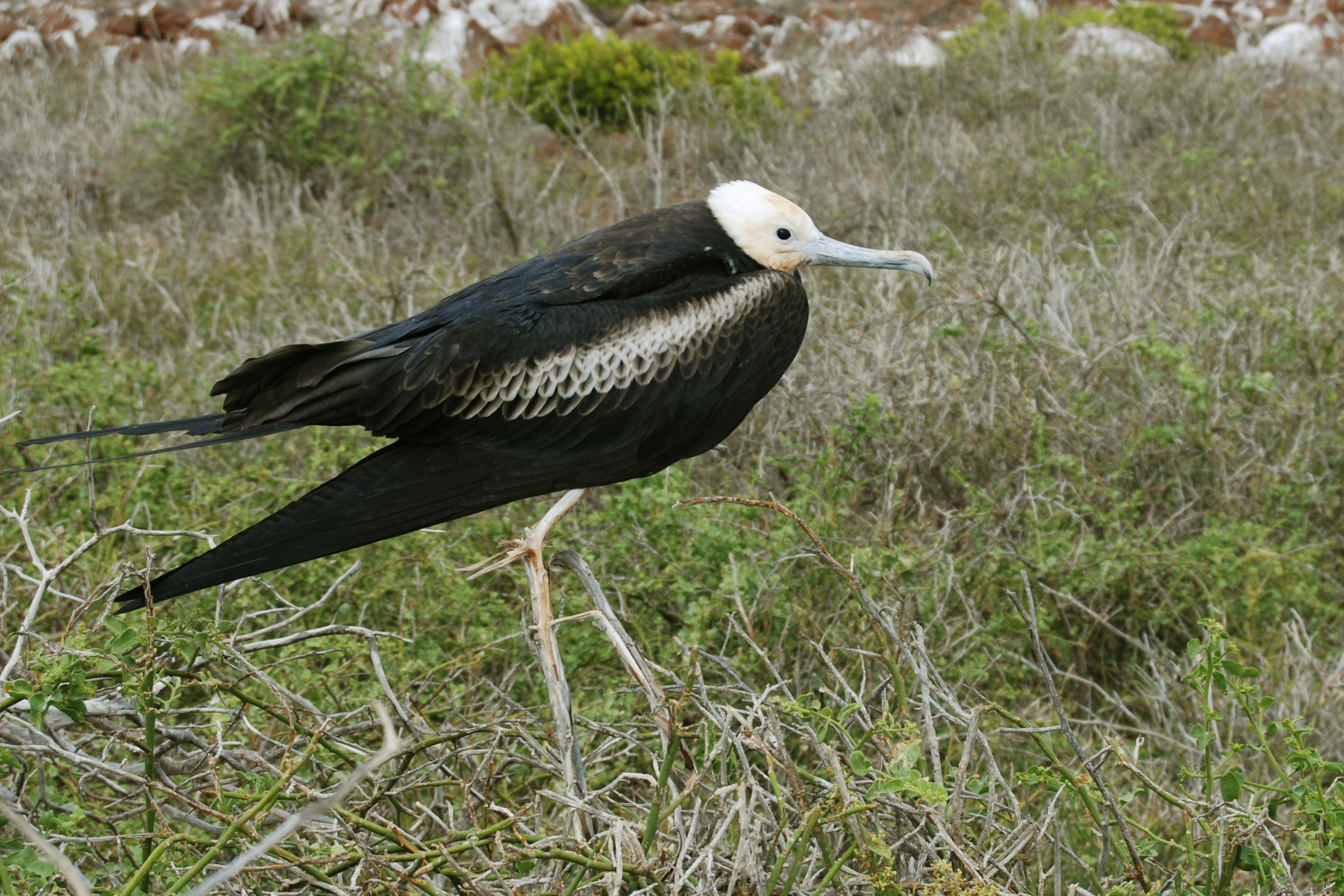
Juvenile

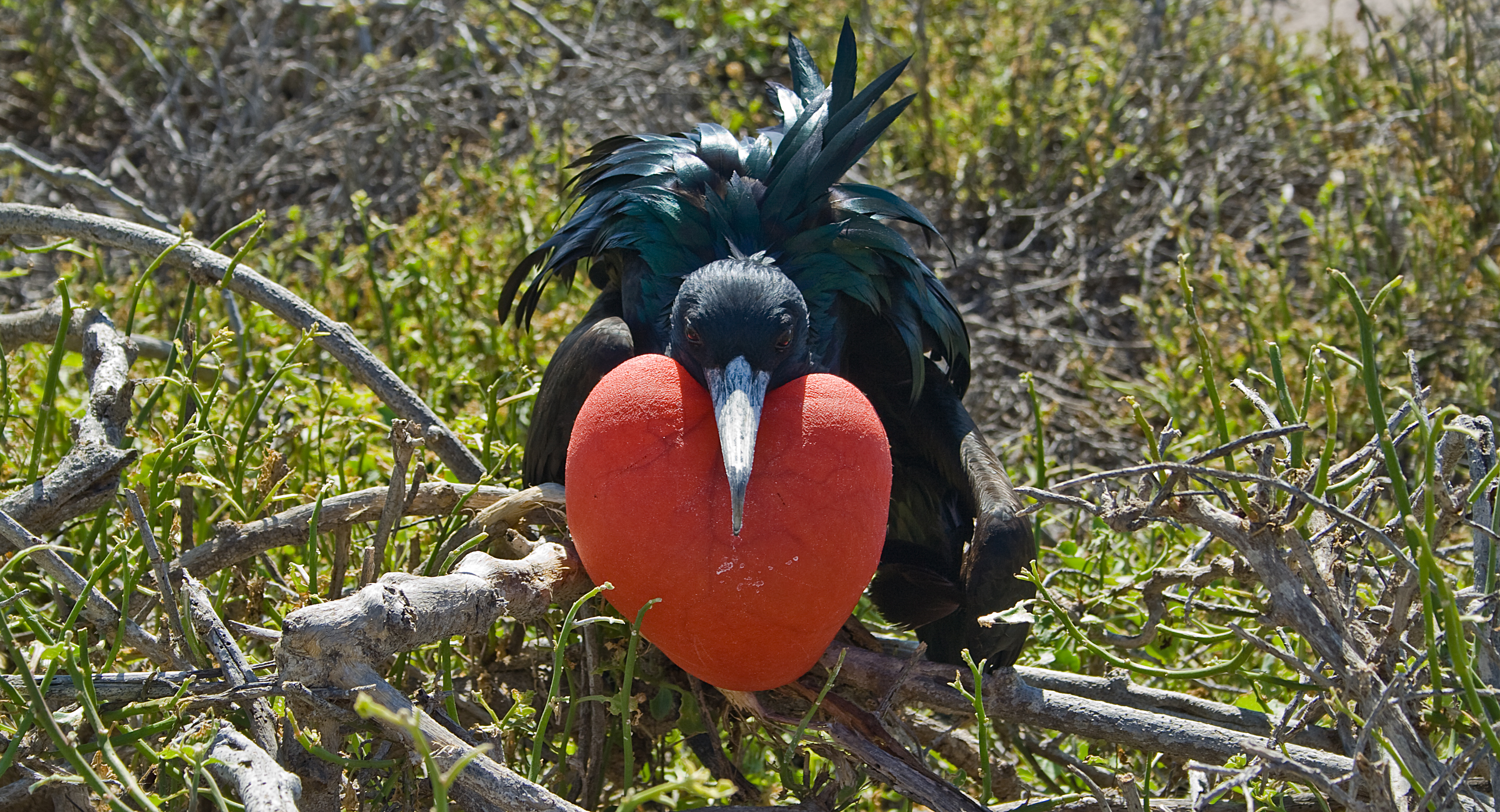
Male with partial inflated throat pouch

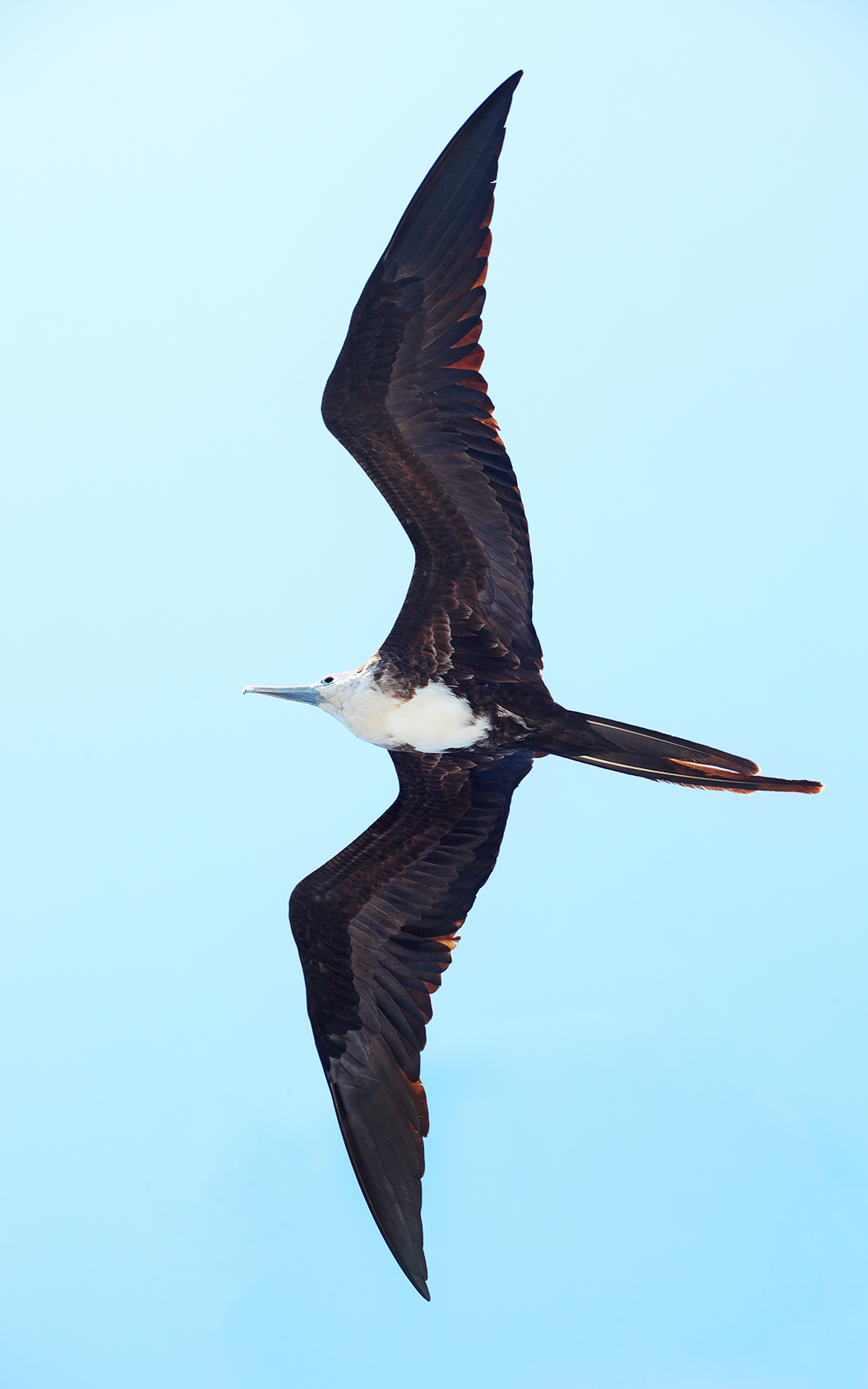
Juvenile in flight, Galapagos Islands

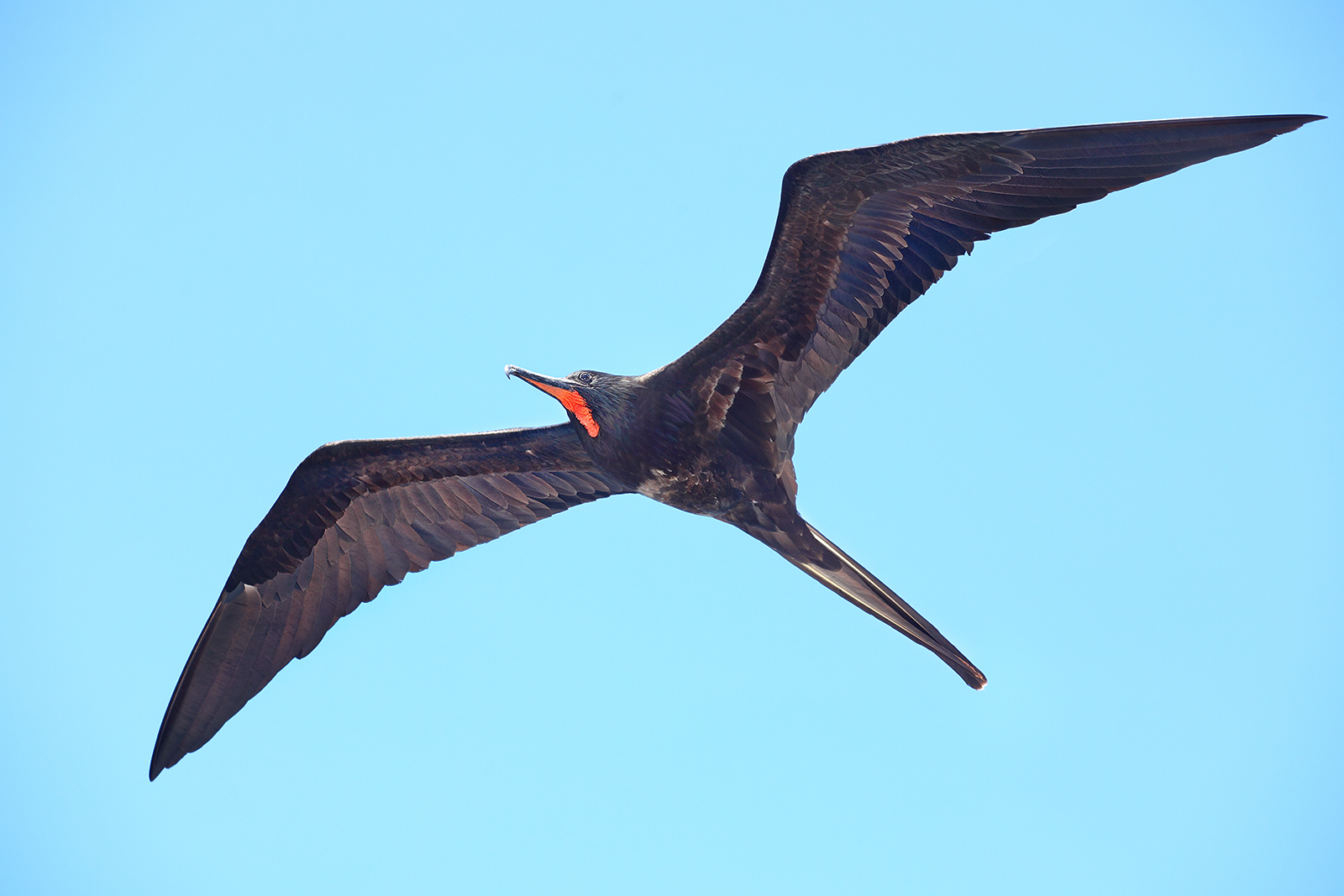
Male in flight, Galapagos Islands

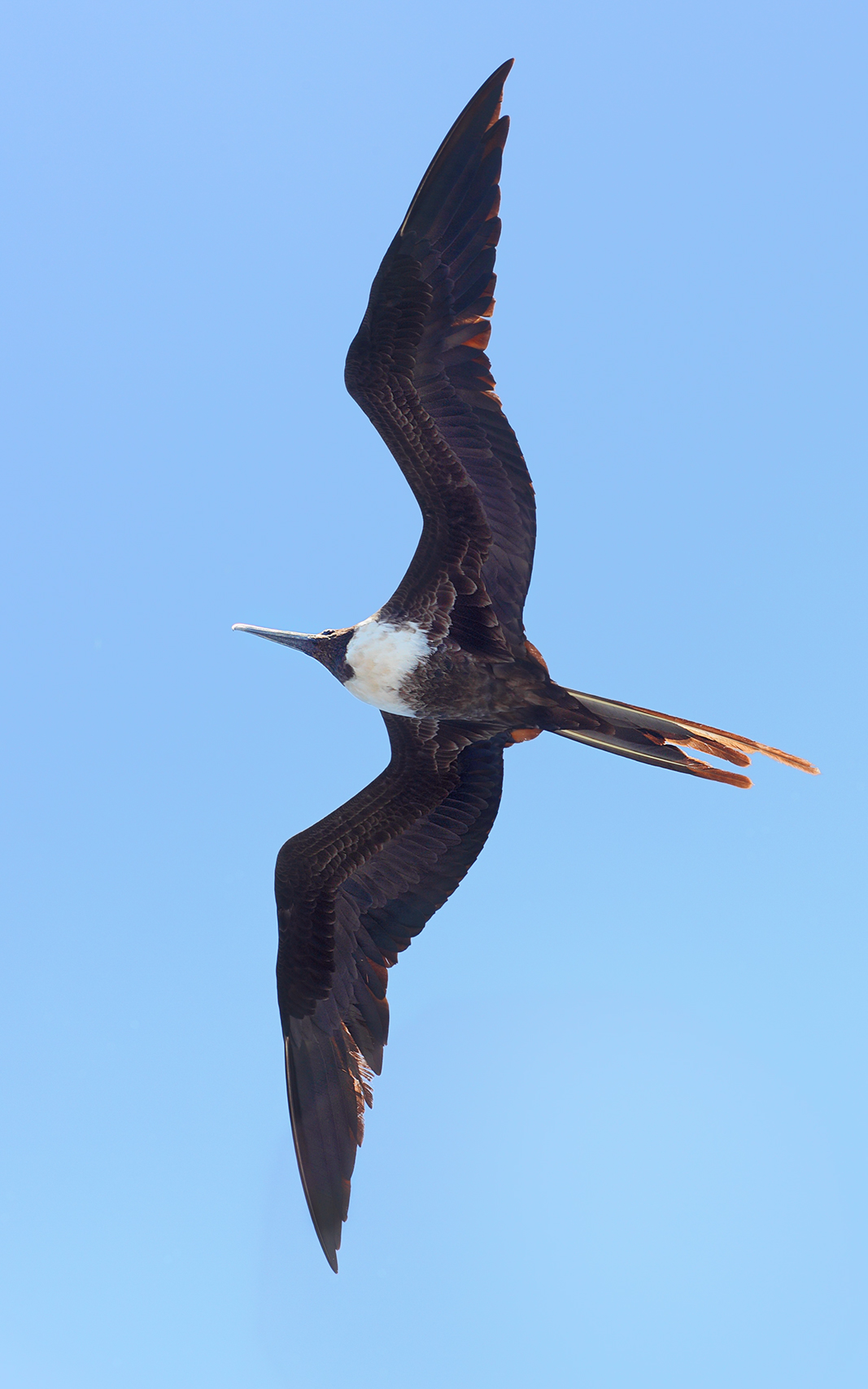
Female in flight, Galapagos Islands

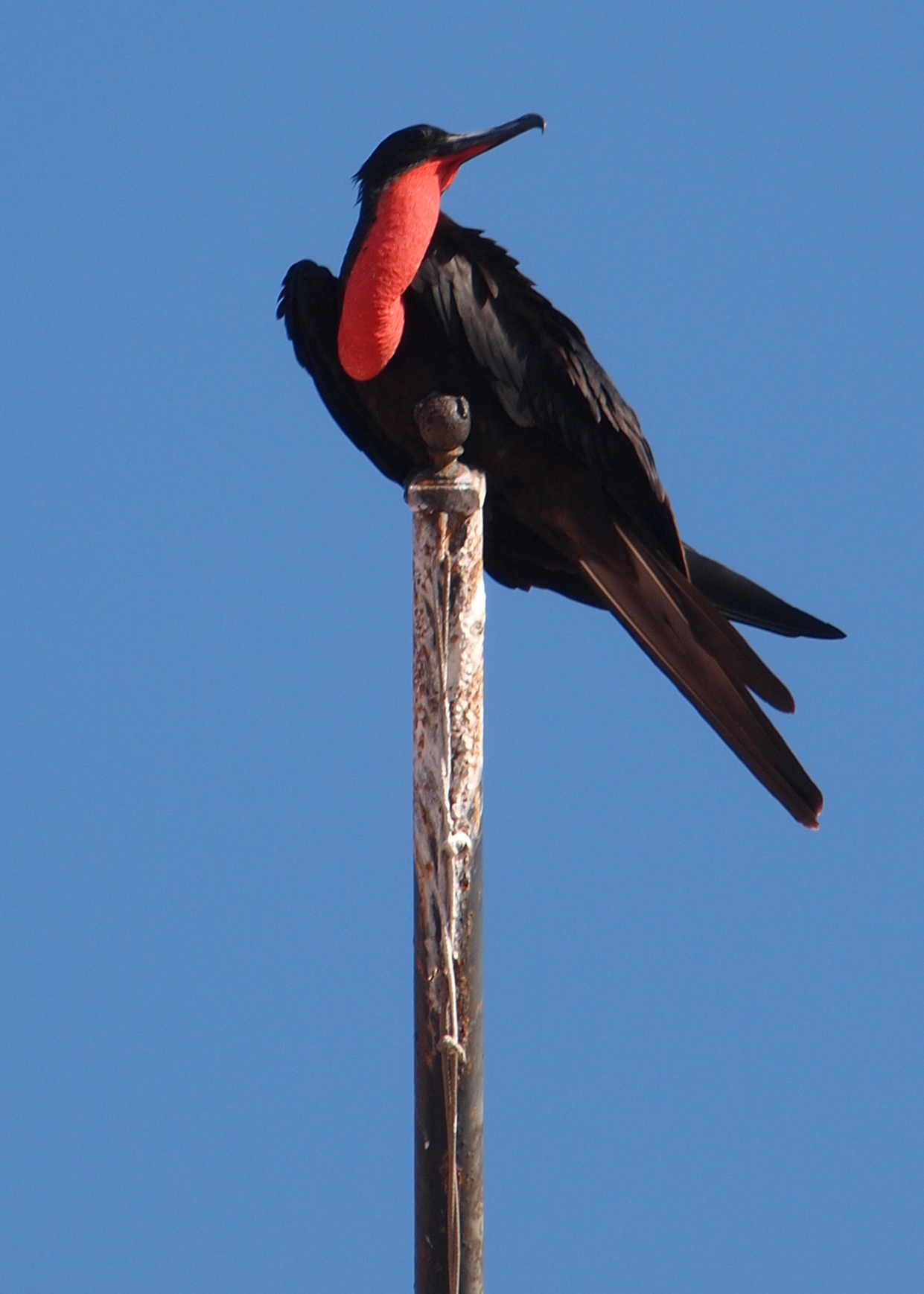
Male, Mexico

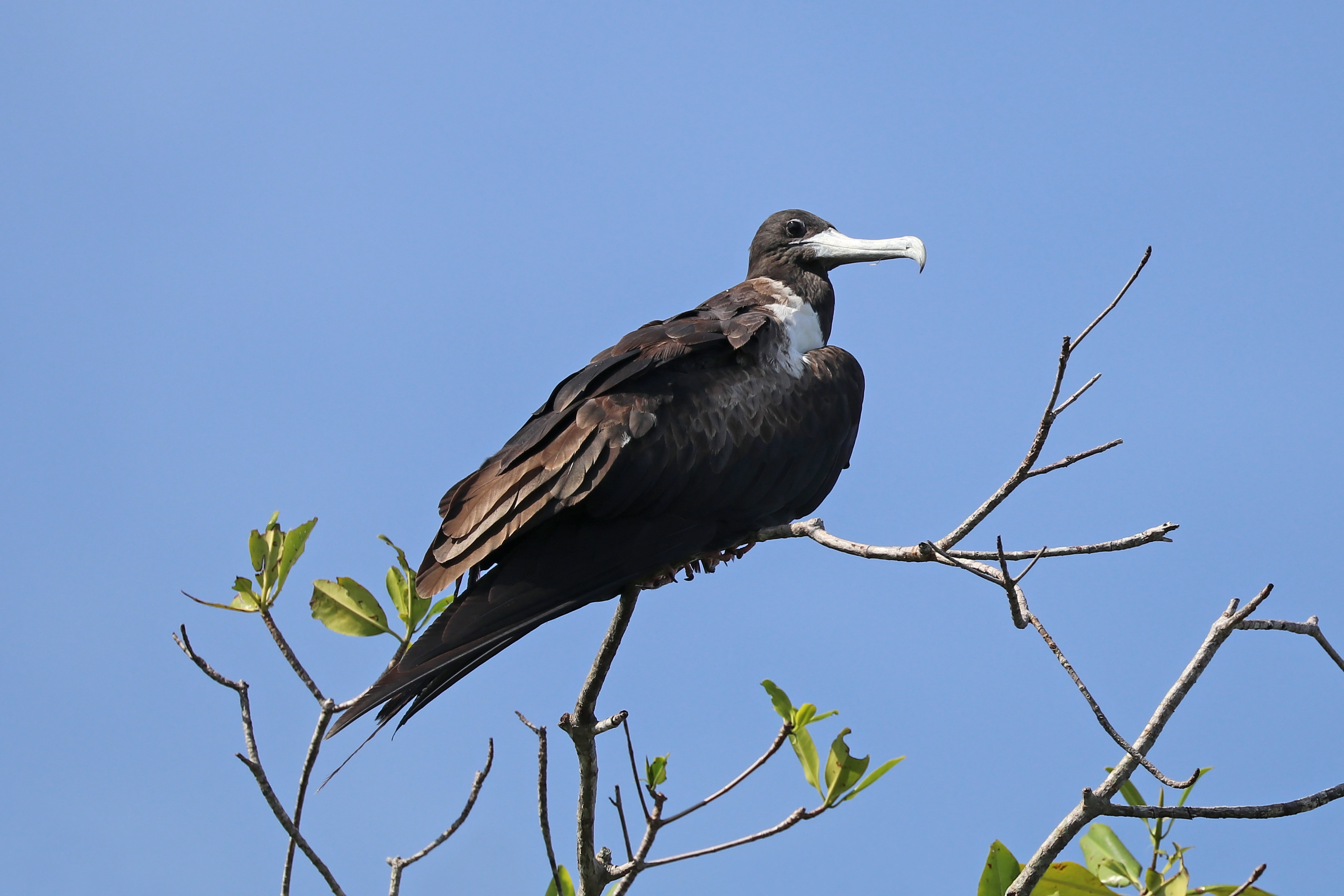
Female, Panama

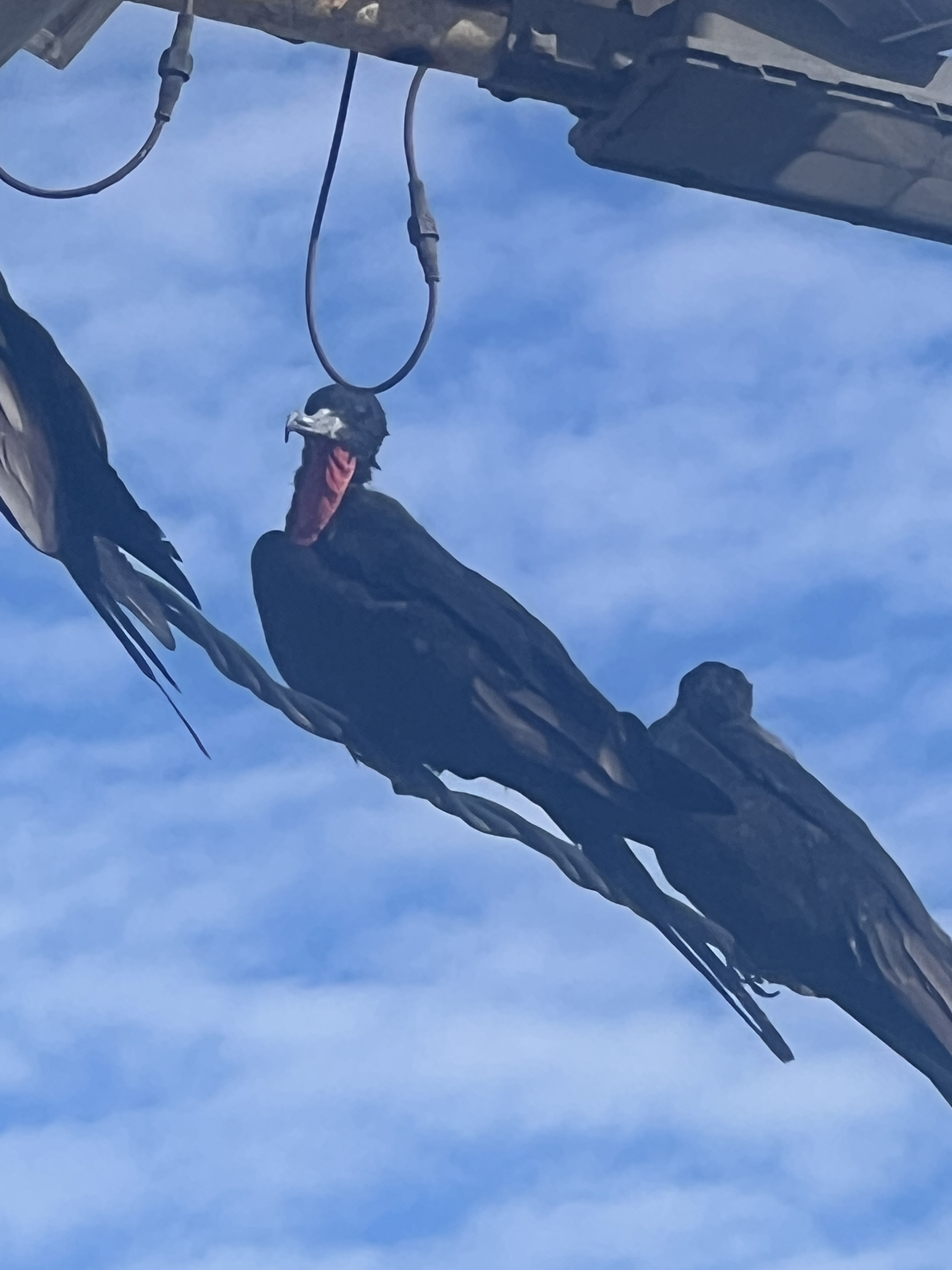
Males at Punta Sal

== Behaviour ==
=== Breeding ===
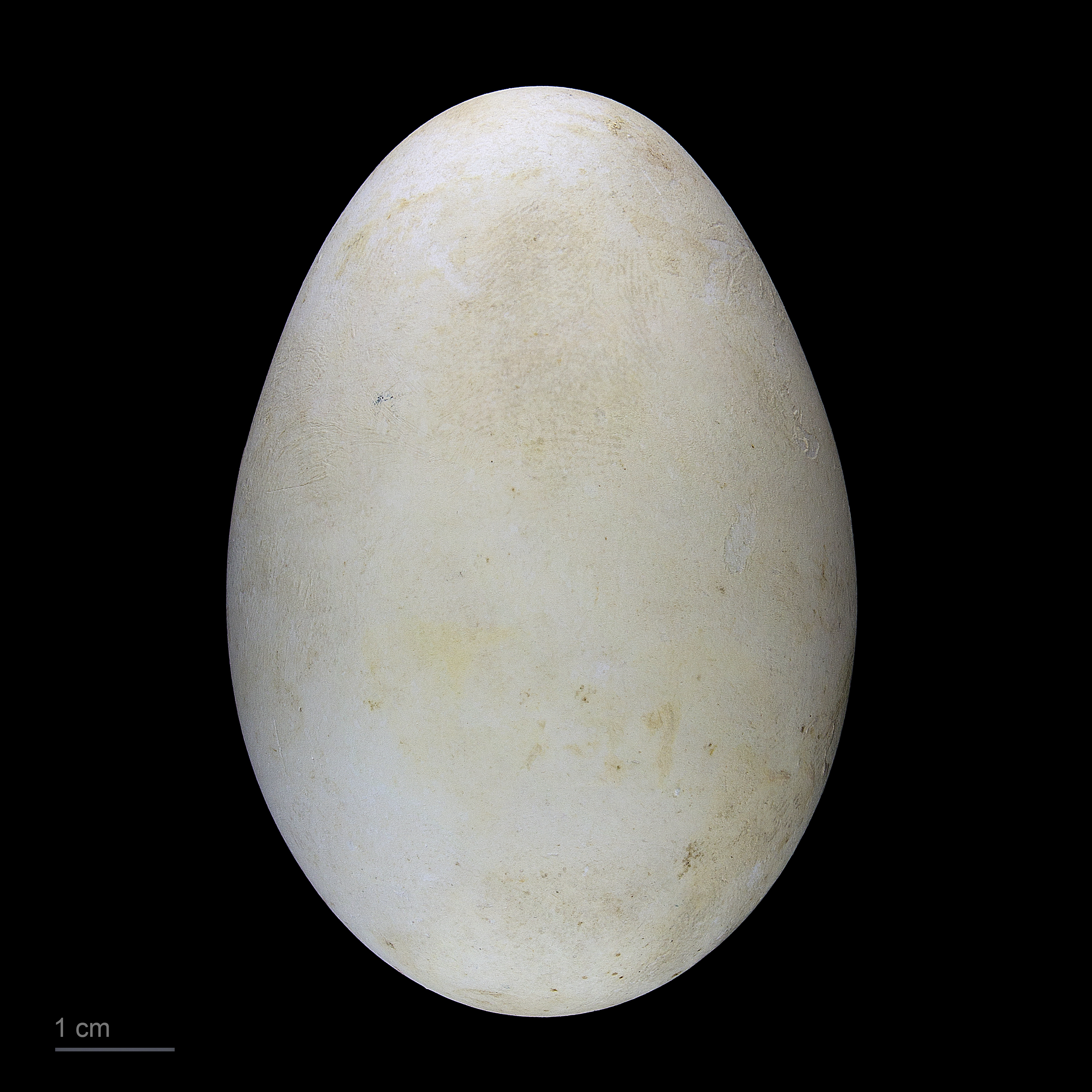
Egg (MHNT)

The male bird displays a large, scarlet red throat pouch to attract a female mate. The female descends to join a male she has chosen. A shallow platform nest is constructed on top of both trees and bushes on islands and cays with mangroves. This nest is made of branches and twigs.

The bird lays a clutch of one clear white egg that measures 68 by 47 millimetres (2 3/4 by 1 3/4 in) on average. This egg is incubated by both sexes for a period of 50 to 60 days. After the egg hatches, the male parent will abandon it, with the female staying to provision for the young for almost a year.

=== Feeding ===
This species feeds mainly on fish, squid, jellyfish and crustaceans. Individual bird diets vary depending on food availability, preferred hunting technique, sex, and age.

It is a kleptoparasite, pecking at other seabirds to force them to disgorge their meals. After forcing the other seabird to regurgitate its meal, the magnificent frigatebird will dive and catch the prey before it hits the surface of the water.

== Status ==
The Galápagos population of the magnificent frigatebird may warrant a separate conservation status. This small population of genetically unique magnificent frigatebirds is vulnerable. Any catastrophic event or threats by humans could wipe out the population of approximately two-thousand magnificent frigatebirds that nest on the Galápagos Islands. Magnificent frigatebirds are currently classified as of Least Concern by the International Union for Conservation of Nature, but because of the genetic uniqueness of those on the Galápagos Islands this may need to be revisited.

This population on Cape Verde is thought to be extremely low and on the brink of extinction, despite the original sighting of this species by Columbus likely being that of the Cape Verde population. Protection of the frigatebird's breeding sites is necessary for the species' recovery.
