= Boatswain Bird =

Boatswain Bird can refer to:

- Another name for the red-billed tropicbird
- Boatswain Bird Island, a small uninhabited island nature reserve, home to many boatswain birds and other species, off the coast of Ascension Island.
