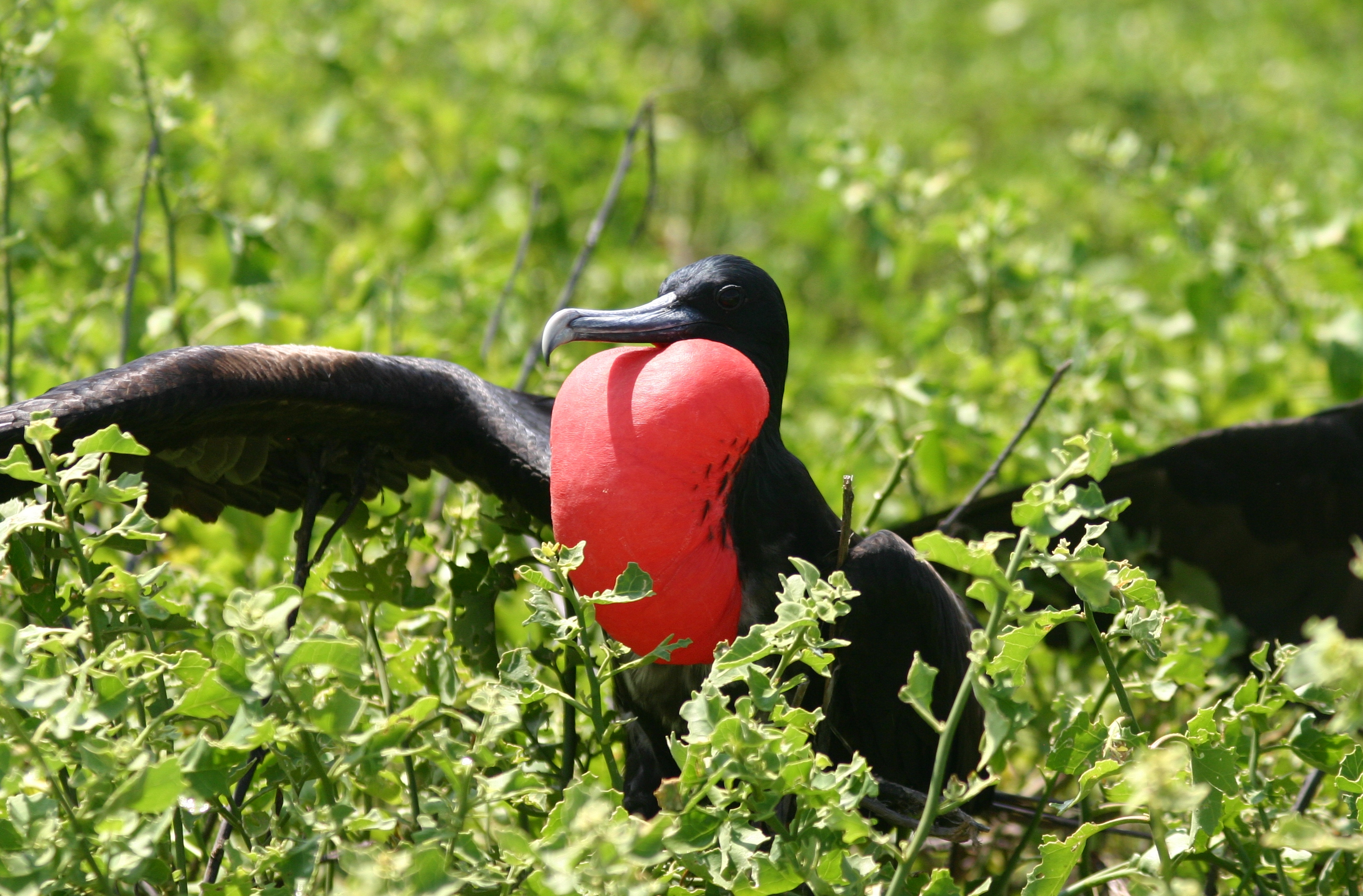
- Adult male, displaying, with inflated gular sac

Conservation status
- Least Concern (IUCN 3.1)

Scientific classification
- Kingdom: Animalia
- Phylum: Chordata
- Class: Aves
- Order: Suliformes
- Family: Fregatidae
- Genus: Fregata
- Species: F. minor

Binomial name
- Fregata minor (Gmelin, 1789)
- Range map

Synonyms
- Pelecanus minor Gmelin 1789; Tachypetes palmerstoni

= Great frigatebird =

Species of bird (Fregata minor)

The great frigatebird (Fregata minor) is a large seabird in the frigatebird family. There are major nesting populations in the tropical Pacific Ocean, such as Hawaii and the Galápagos Islands; in the Indian Ocean, colonies can be found in the Seychelles (on Aldabra and Aride Islands) and Mauritius, and there is a tiny population in the South Atlantic, mostly on and around St. Helena and Boatswain Bird Island (Ascension Island).

The great frigatebird is a large and lightly built seabird up to 105 cm long with predominantly black plumage. The species exhibits sexual dimorphism; the female is larger than the adult male and has a white throat and breast, and the male's scapular feathers have a purple-green sheen. In the breeding season, the male is able to distend his striking red gular sac. The species feeds on fish taken in flight from the ocean's surface (mostly flying fish), and indulges in kleptoparasitism less frequently than other frigatebirds. They feed in pelagic waters within 80 km (50 mi) of their breeding colony or roosting areas.

== Taxonomy ==
The great frigatebird was formally described in 1789 by the German naturalist Johann Friedrich Gmelin in his revised and expanded edition of Carl Linnaeus's Systema Naturae. He placed it in the genus Pelecanus and coined the binomial name Pelecanus minor. Gmelin based his description on the "lesser frigate pelican" that had been described in 1785 by the English ornithologist John Latham in his book A General Synopsis of Birds. Latham, in turn, largely based his account on the "man of war bird" that had been described and illustrated by the English naturalist George Edwards in 1760. The great frigatebird is now considered one of five closely related species of frigatebird that make up their own genus (Fregata) and family (Fregatidae). Its closest relative, within the group, is the Christmas Island frigatebird (Fregata andrewsi). Due to the rules of taxonomy, the species name of minor has been retained. This has led to the discrepancy of minor (Latin for "smaller") in contrast with its common name.

A Late Pleistocene fossilised wing phalanx and proximal end of humerus (indistinguishable from the extant great frigatebird) were recovered from Ulupau Head on Oahu.

=== Subspecies ===
Five subspecies are usually recognised:

- F. m. aldabrensis Mathews, 1914. West Indian Ocean (Aldabra, Comoros, Europa Island)
- F. m. minor (J. F. Gmelin, 1789). Central and East Indian Ocean to South China Sea
- F. m. palmerstoni (J. F. Gmelin, 1789). West and Central Pacific Ocean (Caroline Island, Marshall Islands, Hawaiian Islands, Palmyra atoll, Phoenix Islands, Line Islands including Kiritimati (Christmas Island), Marquesas Islands, Tuamotus, Society Islands, Pitcairn Islands and Isla Salas y Gómez)
- F. m. ridgwayi Mathews, 1914. East Pacific Ocean (Revillagigedo Islands, Cocos Island, Galápagos Islands)
- F. m. nicolli Mathews, 1914. South Atlantic (Trindade and Martim Vaz)

== Description ==
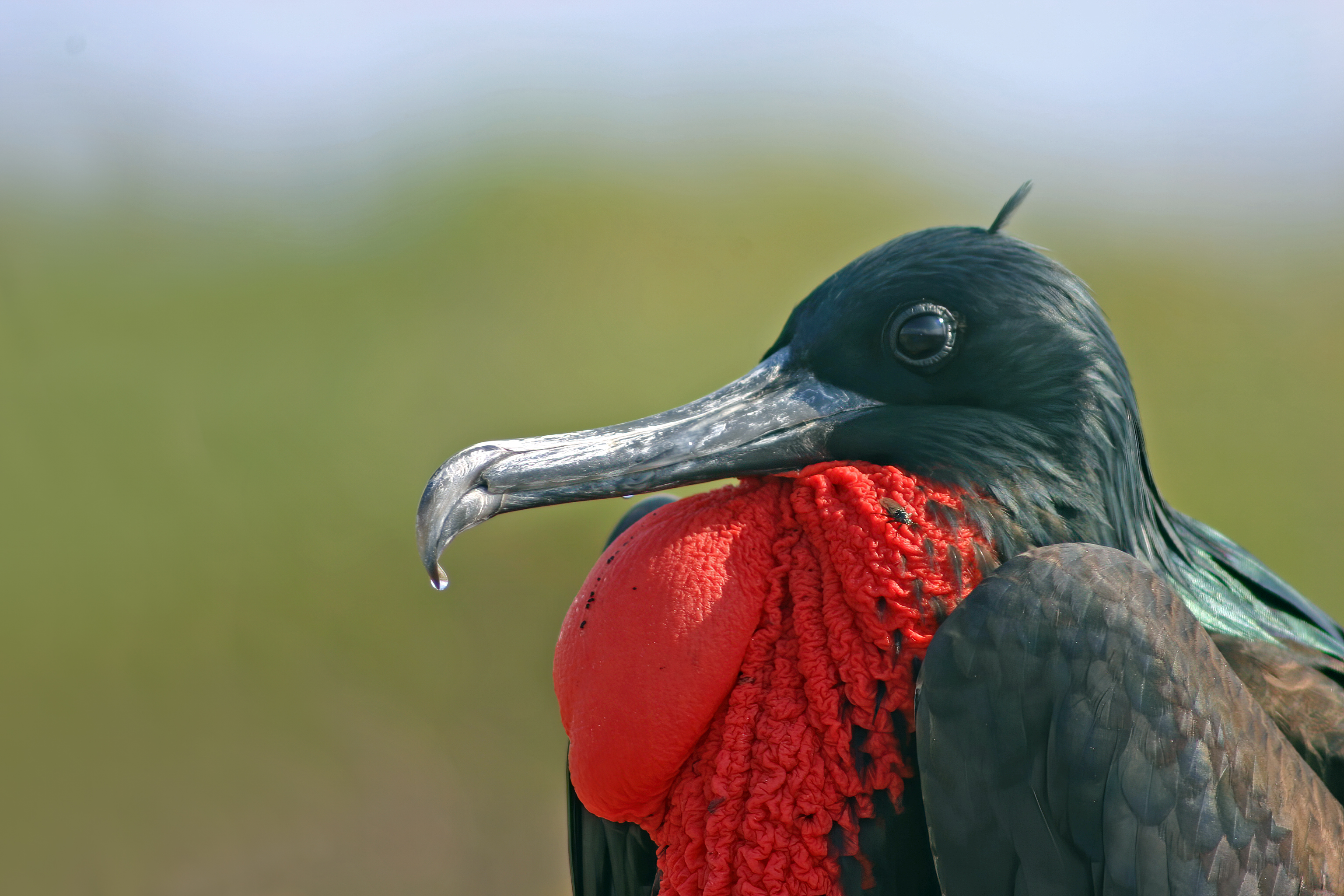
Male, showing feathers on gular sac

The great frigatebird measures 85 to 105 cm (33 to 41 in) in length and has a wingspan of 205–230 cm (81–91 in). Male great frigatebirds are smaller than females, but the extent of the variation varies geographically. The male birds weigh 1,000–1,450 g (2.20–3.20 lb) while the heavier female birds weigh 1,215–1,590 g (2.679–3.505 lb).

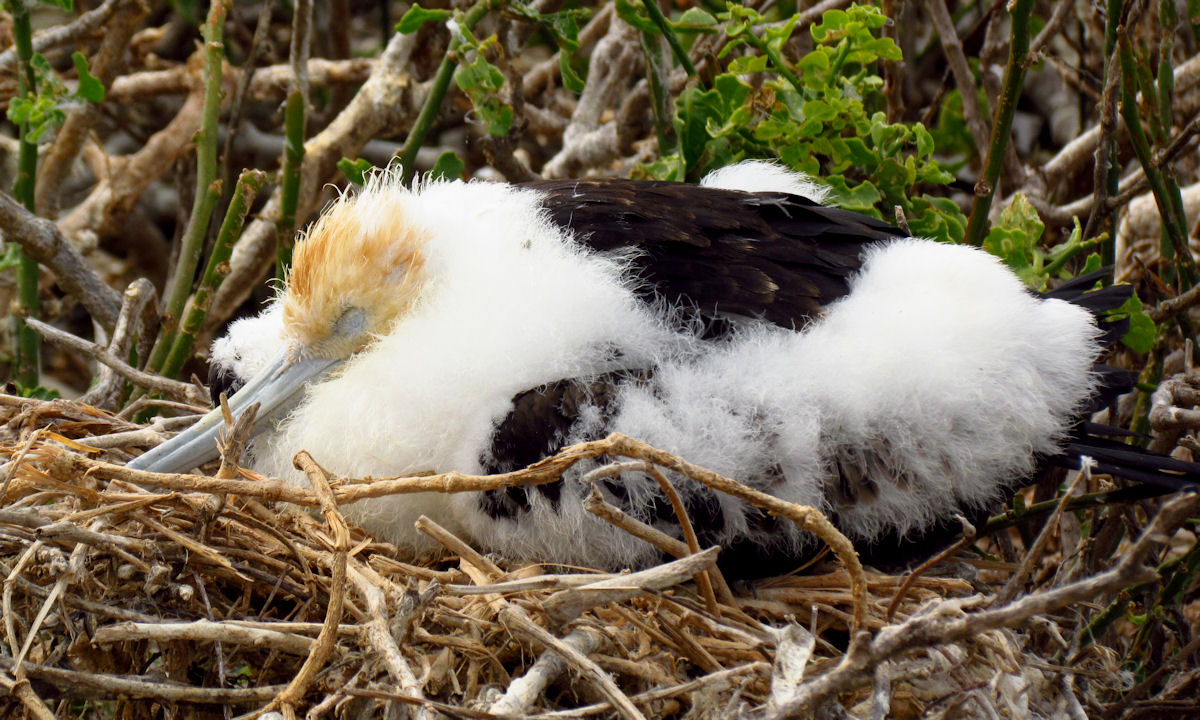
Chick, Genovesa Island, Ecuador

Frigatebirds have long narrow pointed wings and a long narrow deeply forked tail. They have the highest ratio of wing area to body mass and the lowest wing loading of any bird. This has been hypothesized to enable the birds to use marine thermals created by small differences between tropical air and water temperatures. The plumage of males is black with scapular feathers that have a green iridescence when they refract sunlight. Females are black with a white throat and breast and have a red eye ring. Juveniles are black with a rust-tinged white face, head, and throat.

== Distribution and habitat ==
The great frigatebird has a wide distribution throughout the world's tropical seas. Hawaii is the northernmost extent of their range in the Pacific Ocean, with around 10,000 pairs nesting mostly in the Northwestern Hawaiian Islands. In the Central and South Pacific, colonies are found on most island groups from Wake Island to the Galápagos to New Caledonia with a few pairs nesting on Australian possessions in the Coral Sea. Colonies are also found on numerous Indian Ocean islands, the most well-known include the Seychelles islands of Aldabra and Aride, Christmas Island, the Maldives and Mauritius. The Atlantic population is very small, restricted to Ascension Island, St. Helena, and the Brazilian islands of Trindade and Martin Vaz.

Great frigatebirds undertake regular migrations across their range, both regular trips and more infrequent widespread dispersals. Birds marked with wing tags on Tern Island in the French Frigate Shoals were found to regularly travel to Johnston Atoll (873 km), one was reported in Quezon City in the Philippines. One male great frigatebird relocated from Europa Island in the Mozambique Channel to the Maldives 4400 km away for four months, where it fed on rich fishing grounds. Despite their extended range, birds also exhibit philopatry, breeding in their natal colony even if they travel to other colonies.

== Behaviour ==
=== Feeding ===
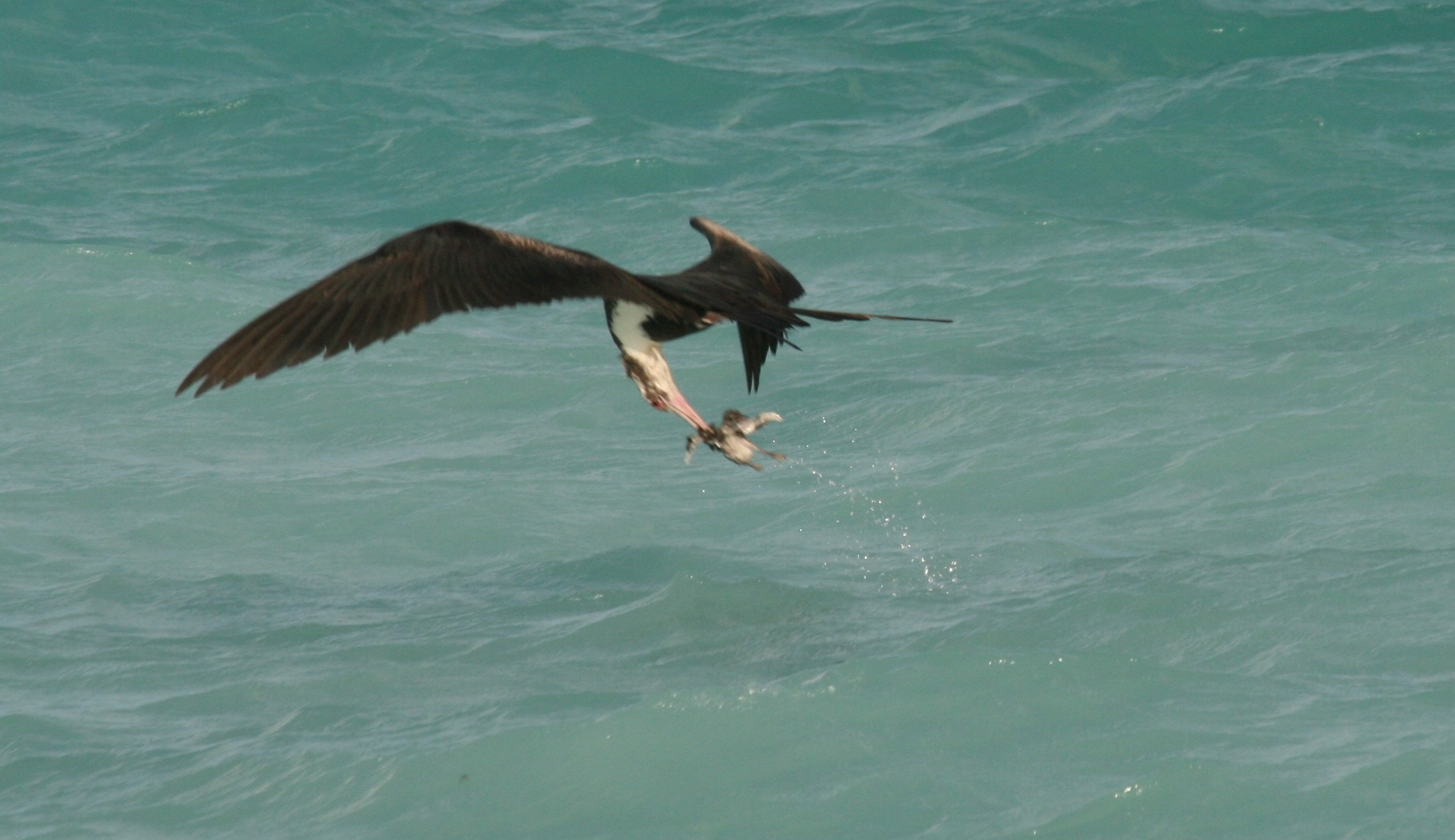
An immature great frigatebird performing a surface snatch on a sooty tern chick dropped by another bird

The great frigatebird forages in pelagic waters within 80 km (50 mi) of the breeding colony or roosting areas. Flying fish from the family Exocoetidae are the most common item in the diet of the great frigatebird; other fish species and squid may be eaten as well. Prey is snatched while in flight, either from just below the surface or from the air in the case of flying fish flushed from the water. Great frigatebirds will make use of schools of predatory tuna or pods of dolphins that push schooling fish to the surface. Like all frigatebirds they will not alight on the water surface and are usually incapable of taking off should they accidentally do so. They are often seen foraging in large, mixed-species flocks, especially flocking with sooty terns and wedge-tailed shearwaters.

Great frigatebirds will also hunt seabird chicks at their breeding colonies, taking mostly the chicks of sooty terns, spectacled terns, brown noddies, black noddies and even from other great frigatebirds. Studies show that only females (adults and juveniles) hunt in this fashion, and only a few individuals account for most of the kills. Great frigatebirds will also feed opportunistically in coastal areas on turtle hatchlings and fish scraps from commercial fishing operations.

Great frigatebirds will attempt kleptoparasitism, chasing other nesting seabirds (boobies, tropicbirds and gadfly petrels in particular) in order to make them regurgitate their food. This behaviour is not thought to play a significant part of the diet of the species, and is instead a supplement to food obtained by hunting. A study of great frigatebirds stealing from masked boobies estimated that the frigatebirds could at most obtain 40% of the food they needed, and on average obtained only 5%.

=== Breeding ===
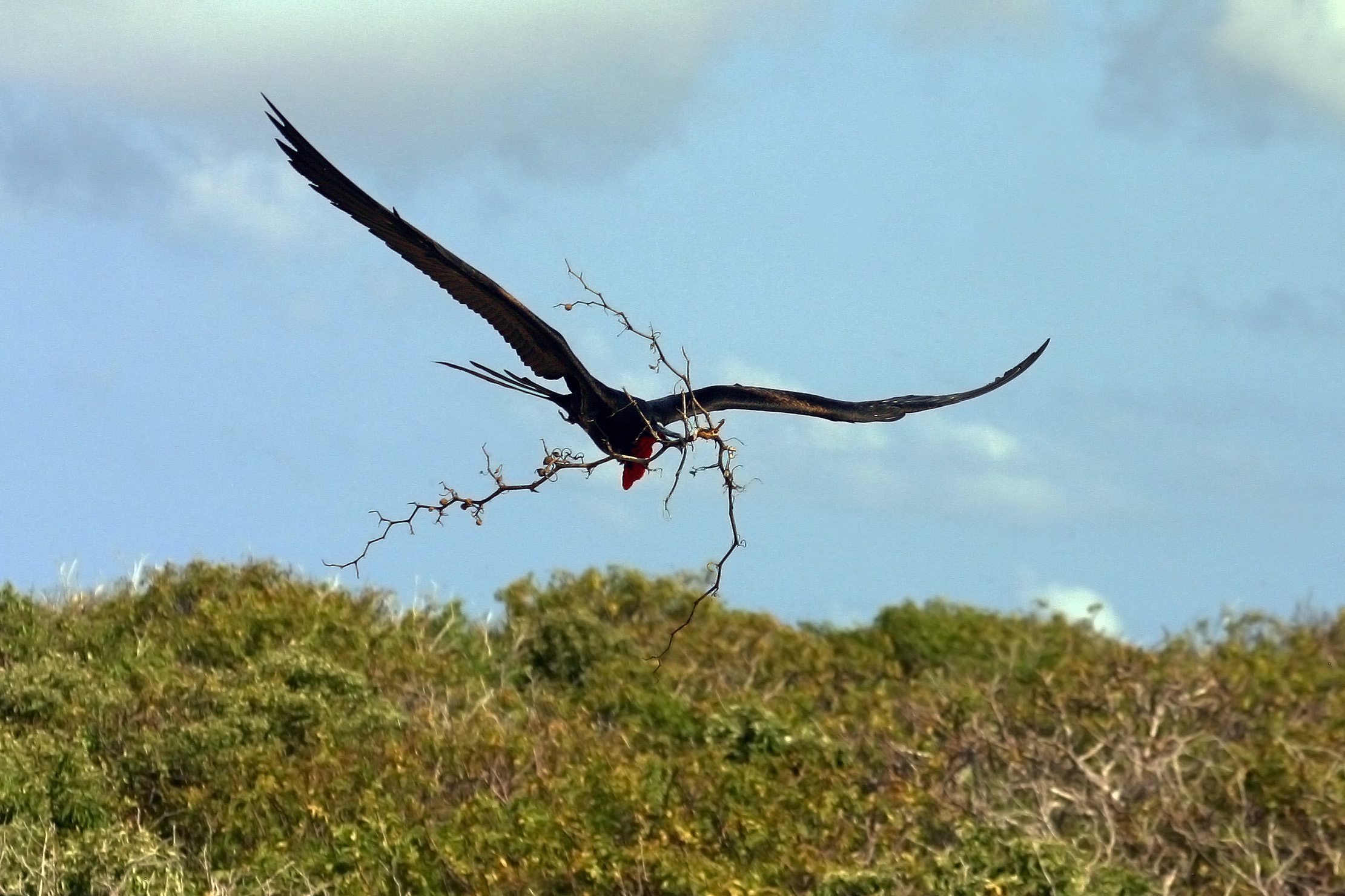
Male collecting twigs for the nest

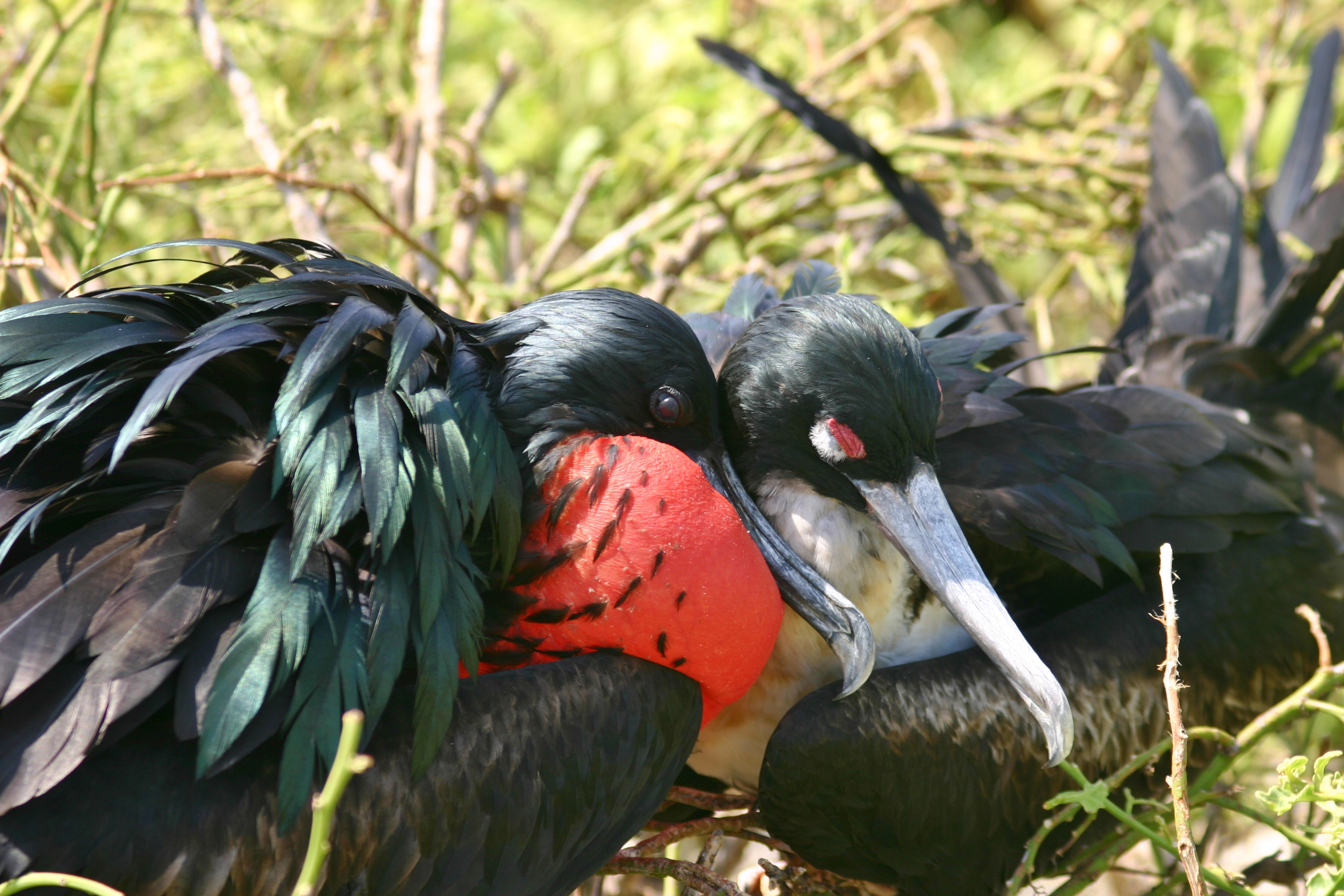
Breeding pair

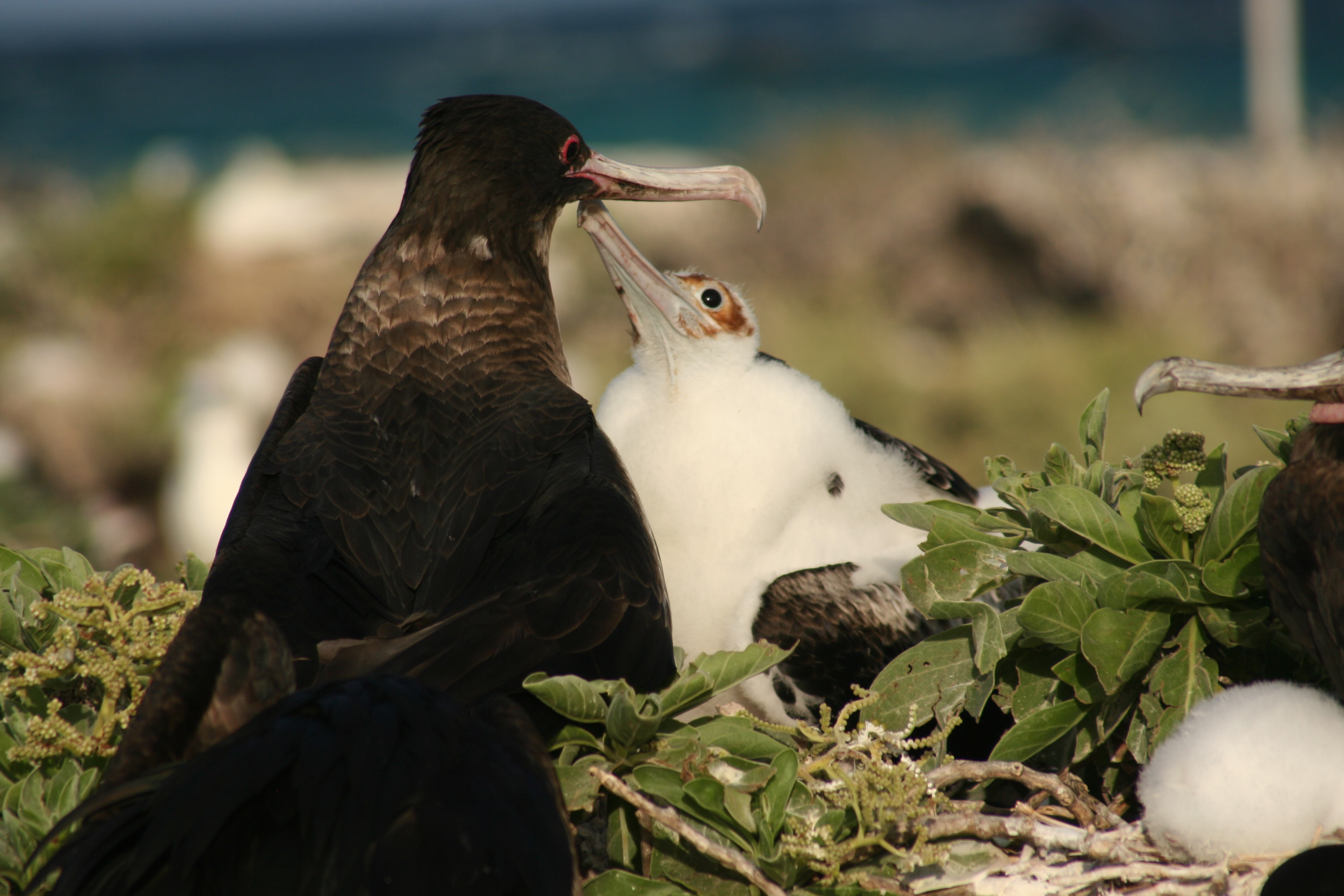
Chick begging from female parent

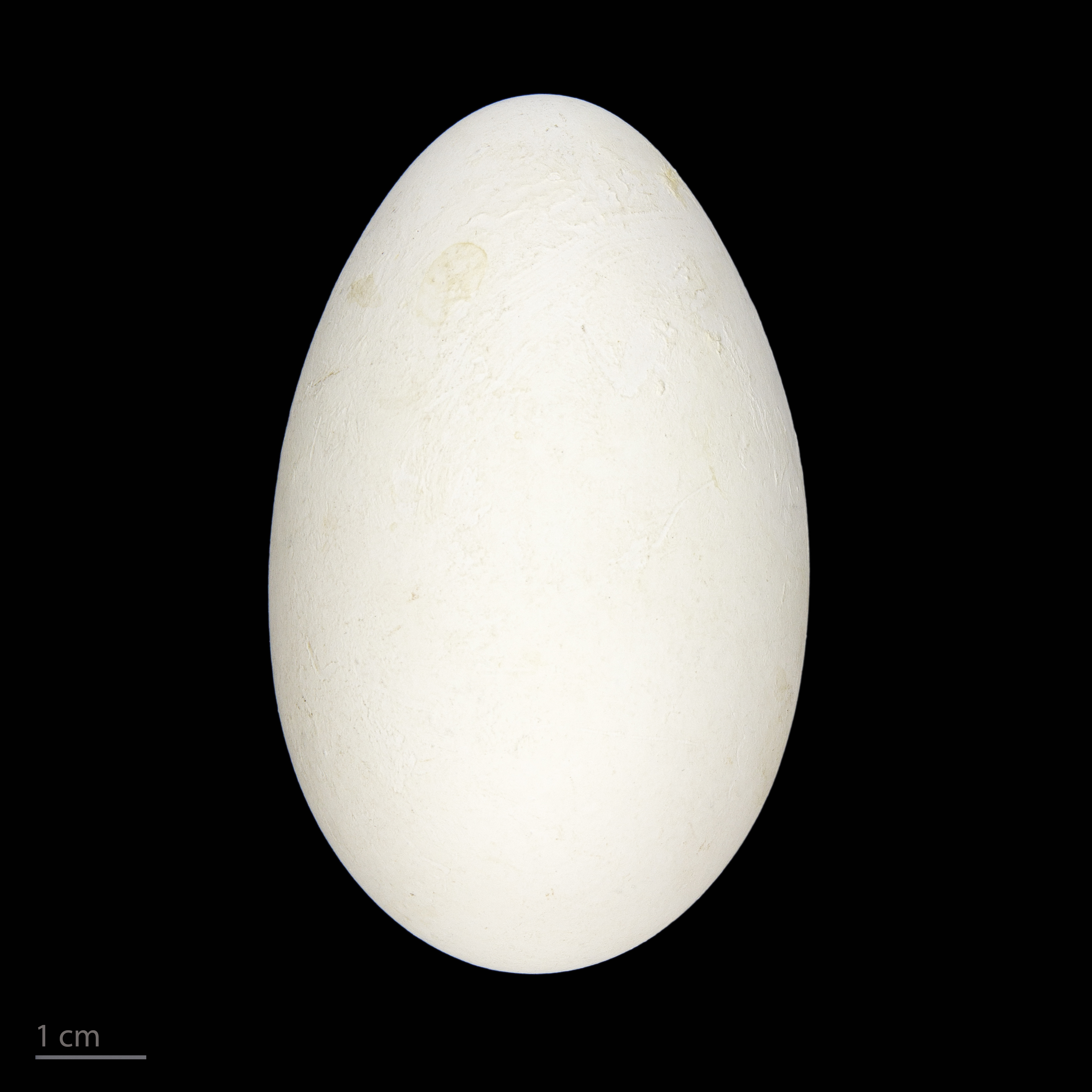
Fregata minor - MHNT

Great frigatebirds are seasonally monogamous, with a breeding season that can take two years from mating to the end of parental care. The species is colonial, nesting in bushes and trees (and on the ground in the absence of vegetation) in colonies of up to several thousand pairs. Nesting bushes are often shared with other species, especially red-footed boobies and other species of frigatebirds.

Both sexes have a patch of skin at the throat that is the gular sac; in male great frigatebirds this skin is red and can be inflated to attract a mate. Groups of males sit in bushes and trees and force air into their sac, causing it to inflate over a period of 20 minutes into a startling red balloon. As females fly overhead the males waggle their heads from side to side, shake their wings and call. Females will observe many groups of males before forming a pair bond. Having formed a bond the pair will sometimes select the display site, or may seek another site, to form a nesting site; once a nesting site has been established both sexes will defend their territory (the area surrounding the nest that can be reached from the nest) from other frigatebirds.

Pair bond formation and nest-building can be completed in a couple of days by some pairs and can take a couple of weeks (up to four) for other pairs. Males collect loose nesting material (twigs, vines, flotsam) from around the colony and off the ocean surface and return to the nesting site where the female builds the nest. Nesting material may be stolen from other seabird species (in the case of black noddies the entire nest may be stolen) either snatched off the nesting site or stolen from other birds themselves foraging for nesting material. Great frigatebird nests are large platforms of loosely woven twigs that quickly become encrusted with guano. There is little attempt to maintain the nests during the breeding season and nests may disintegrate before the end of the season.

A single dull chalky-white egg measuring 68 mm × 48 mm (2.7 in × 1.9 in) is laid during each breeding season. If the egg is lost the pair bond breaks; females may acquire a new mate and lay again in that year. Both parents incubate the egg in shifts that last between 3–6 days; the length of shift varies by location, although female shifts are longer than those of males. Incubation can be energetically demanding, birds have been recorded losing between 20 and 33% of their body mass during a shift.

Incubation lasts for around 55 days. Great frigatebird chicks begin calling a few days before hatching and rub their egg tooth against the shell. The altricial chicks are naked and helpless, and lie prone for several days after hatching. Chicks are brooded for two weeks after hatching after which they are covered in white down, and guarded by a parent for another fortnight after that. Chicks are given numerous meals a day after hatching, once older they are fed every one to two days. Feeding is by regurgitation, the chick sticks its head inside the adult's mouth.

Parental care is prolonged in great frigatebirds. Fledging occurs after four to six months, the timing dependent on oceanic conditions and food availability. After fledging chicks continue to receive parental care for between 150 and 428 days; frigatebirds have the longest period of post-fledging parental care of any bird. The length of this care depends on oceanic conditions, in bad years (particularly El Niño years) the period of care is longer. The diet of these juvenile birds is provided in part by food they obtained for themselves and in part from their parents. Young fledglings will also engage in play; with one bird picking up a stick and being chased by one or more other fledglings. After the chick drops the stick the chaser attempts to catch the stick before it hits the water, after which the game starts again. This play is thought to be important in developing the aerial skills needed to fish.

Great frigatebirds take many years to reach sexual maturity and breed only once they have acquired the full adult plumage. This is attained by female birds when they are eight to nine years of age and for male birds when they are 10 to 11 years of age. The average lifespan is unknown but is assumed to be relatively long. As part of a study conducted in 2002 on Tern Island in Hawaii, 35 ringed great frigatebirds were recaptured. Of these 10 were 37 years or older and one was at least 44 years old.

== Status ==
Because of the large overall total population and extended range, the species is classified by the International Union for Conservation of Nature as being of Least Concern.

In the South Atlantic, great frigatebirds (subspecies F. m. nicolli) once bred on both Saint Helena and Trindade. The Saint Helena population disappeared in ancient times and is known only from subfossil remains, estimated to be a few hundred years old. The Trindade archipelago is part of a Brazilian military area and the human population consists only of a few Brazilian Navy personnel, limiting easy access for ornithologists. Once abundant, it has disappeared as a breeding bird from the main island of Trindade, but small numbers remain elsewhere in this archipelago. The main island was once covered in forest but after this was destroyed, overgrazing by the introduced goats prevented any recovery. A series of eradication programs in the second half of the 20th century eliminated all the introduced vertebrates other than house mice. Feral cats that had seriously depleted ground nesting birds were finally eradicated in 1998. In Brazil, the only country where F. m. nicolli survives, the great frigatebird is considered critically endangered.

== Gallery ==
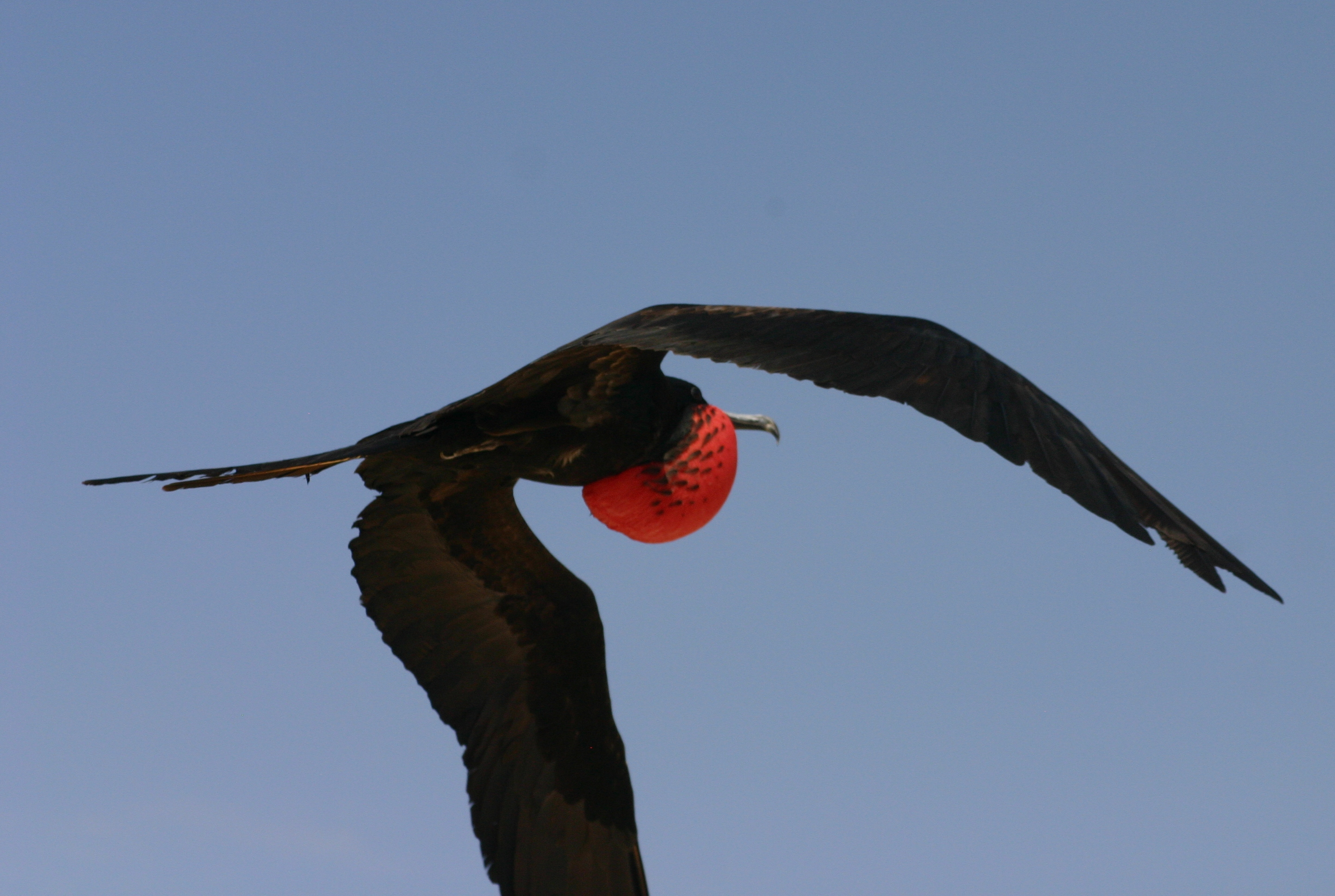
Male in flight, Galápagos Islands

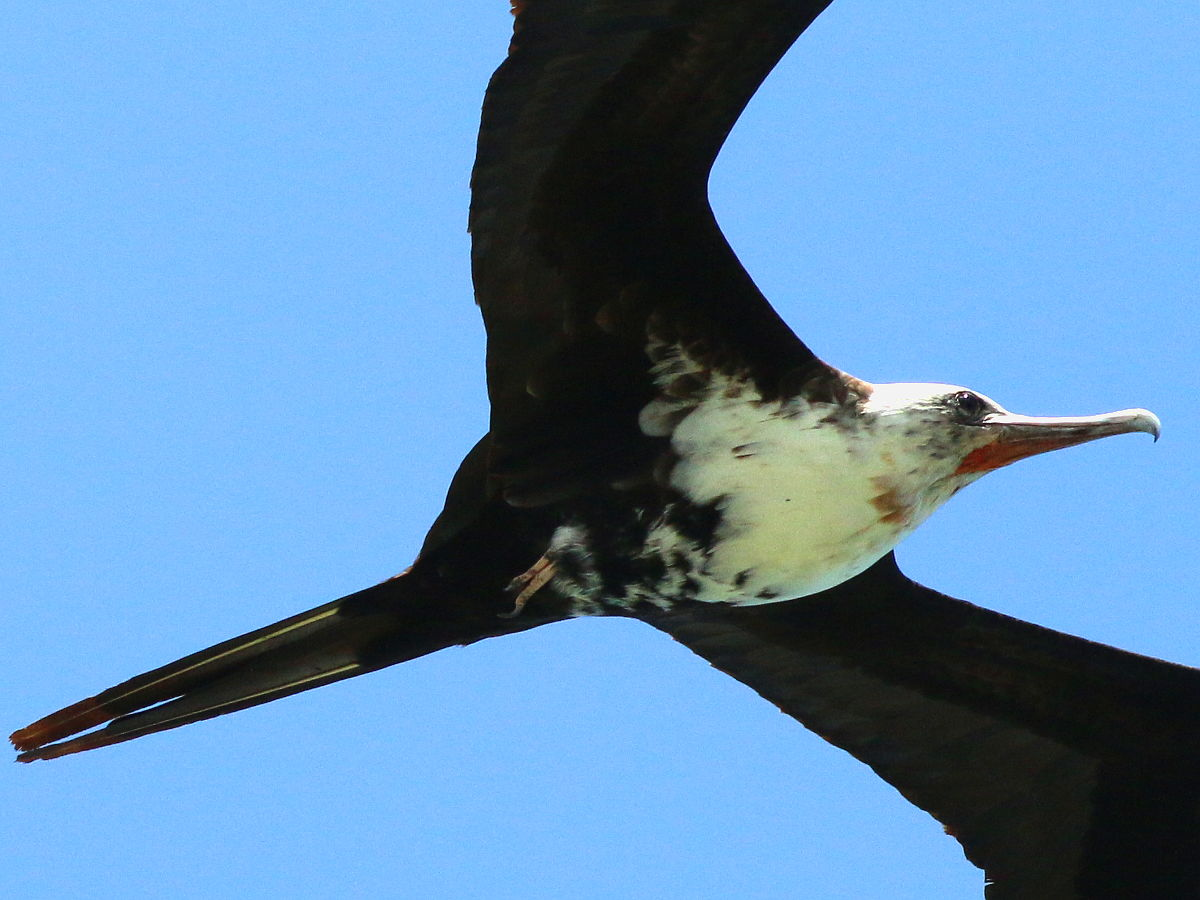
Juvenile male in flight

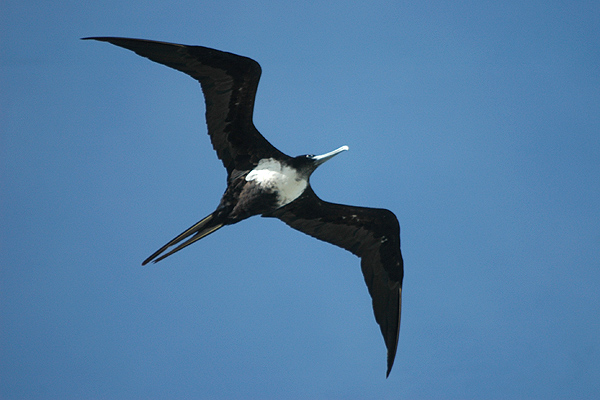
Female in flight

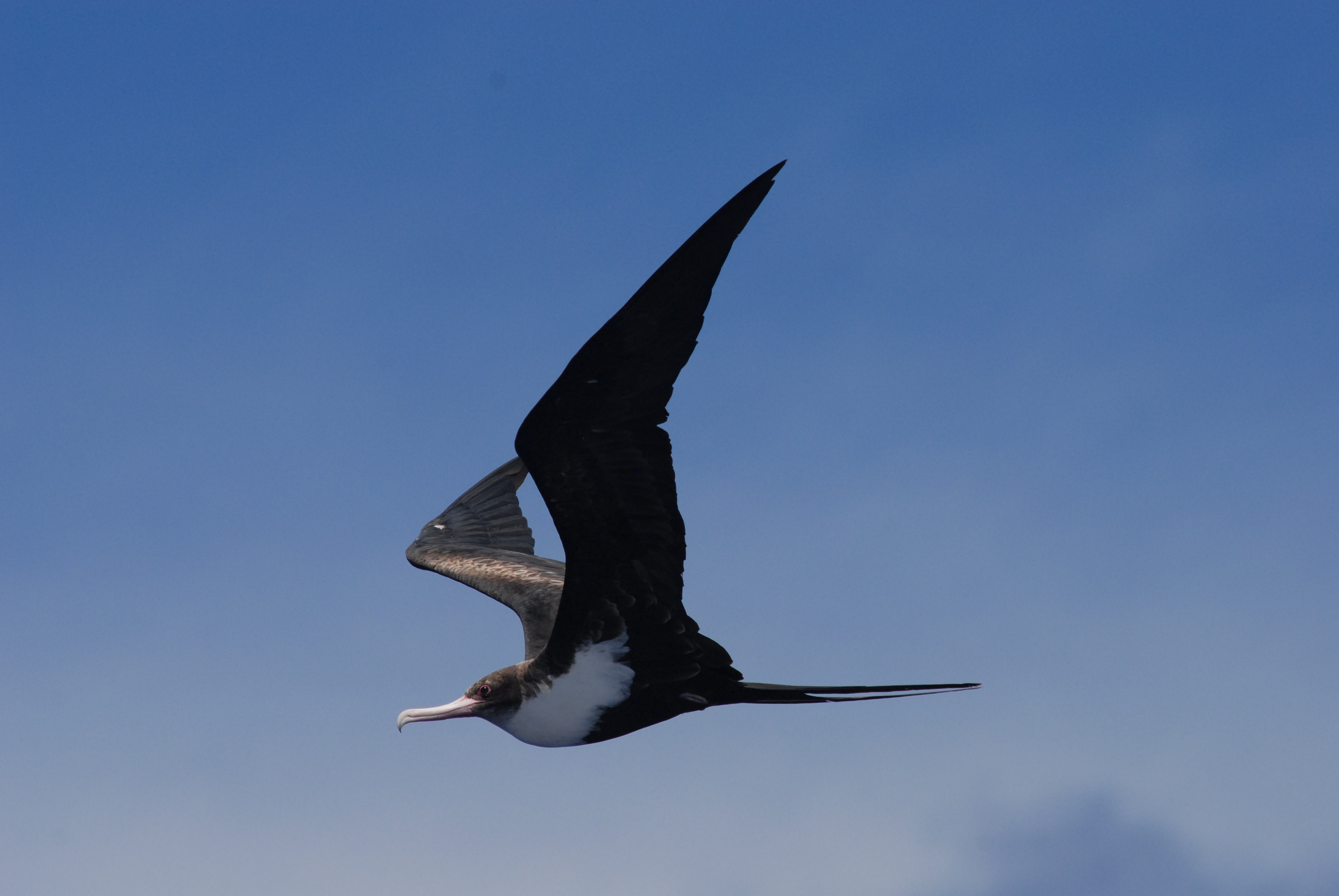
Another female in flight

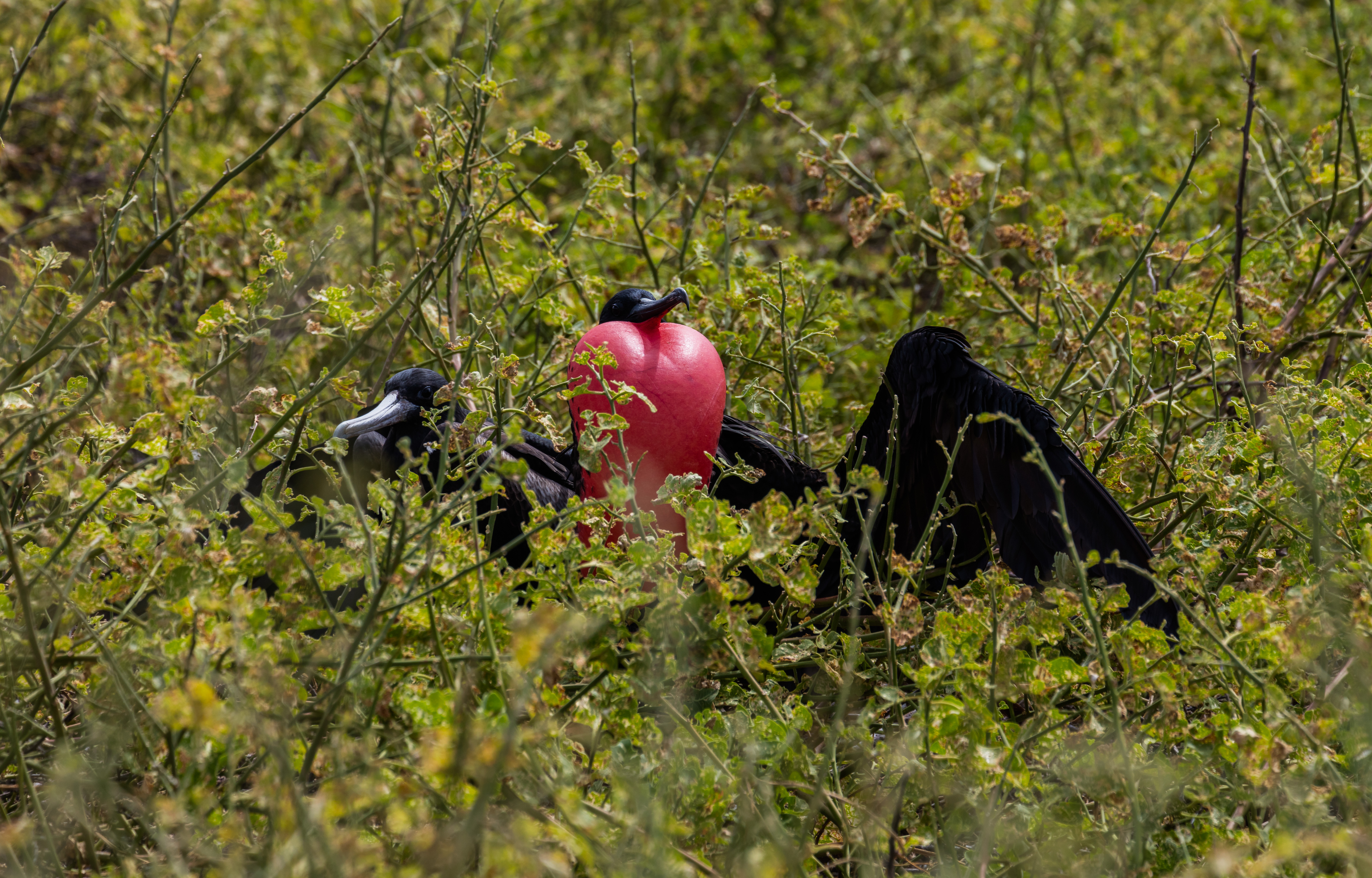
Male, Galápagos Islands

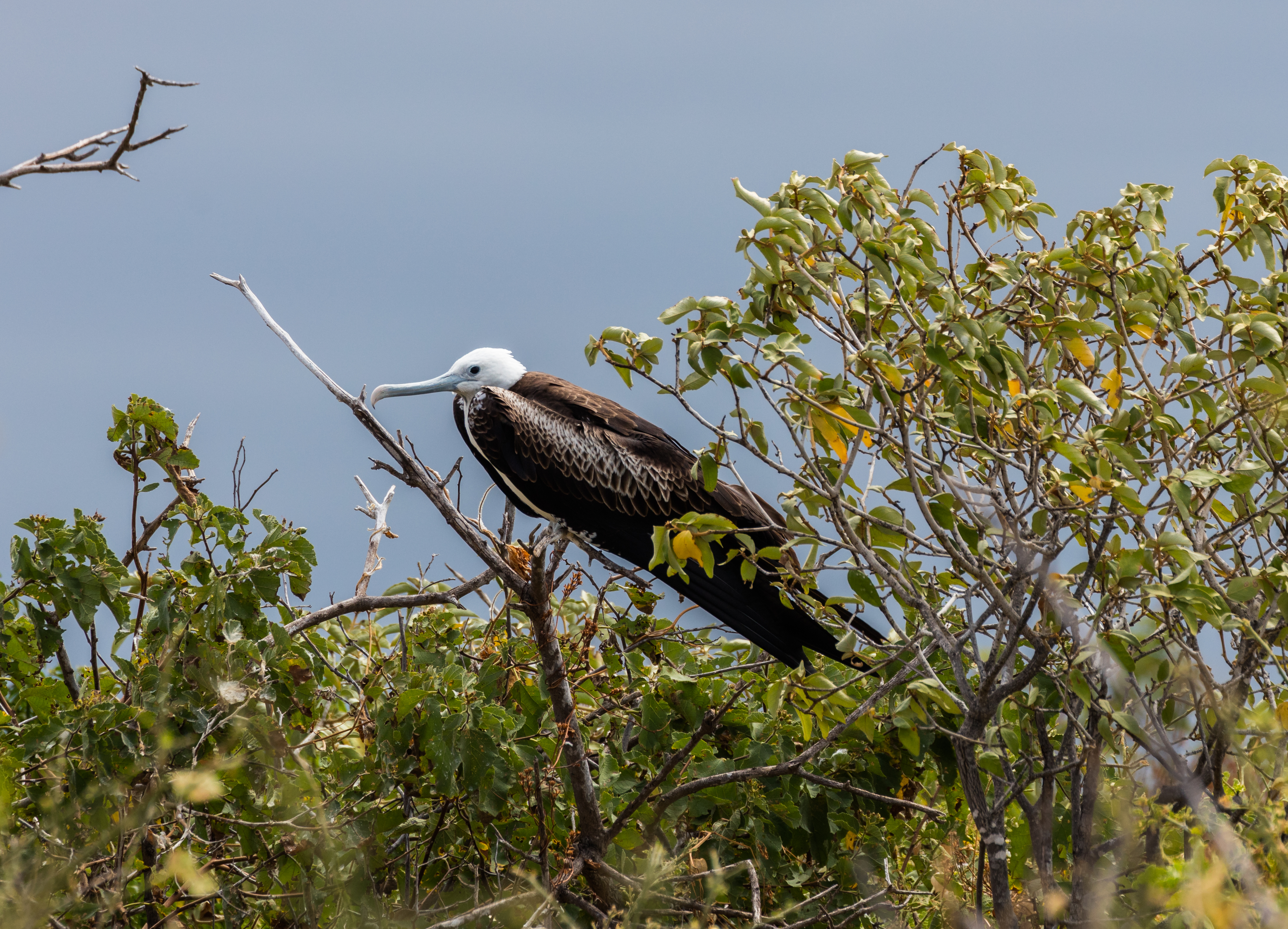
Female, Galápagos Islands
