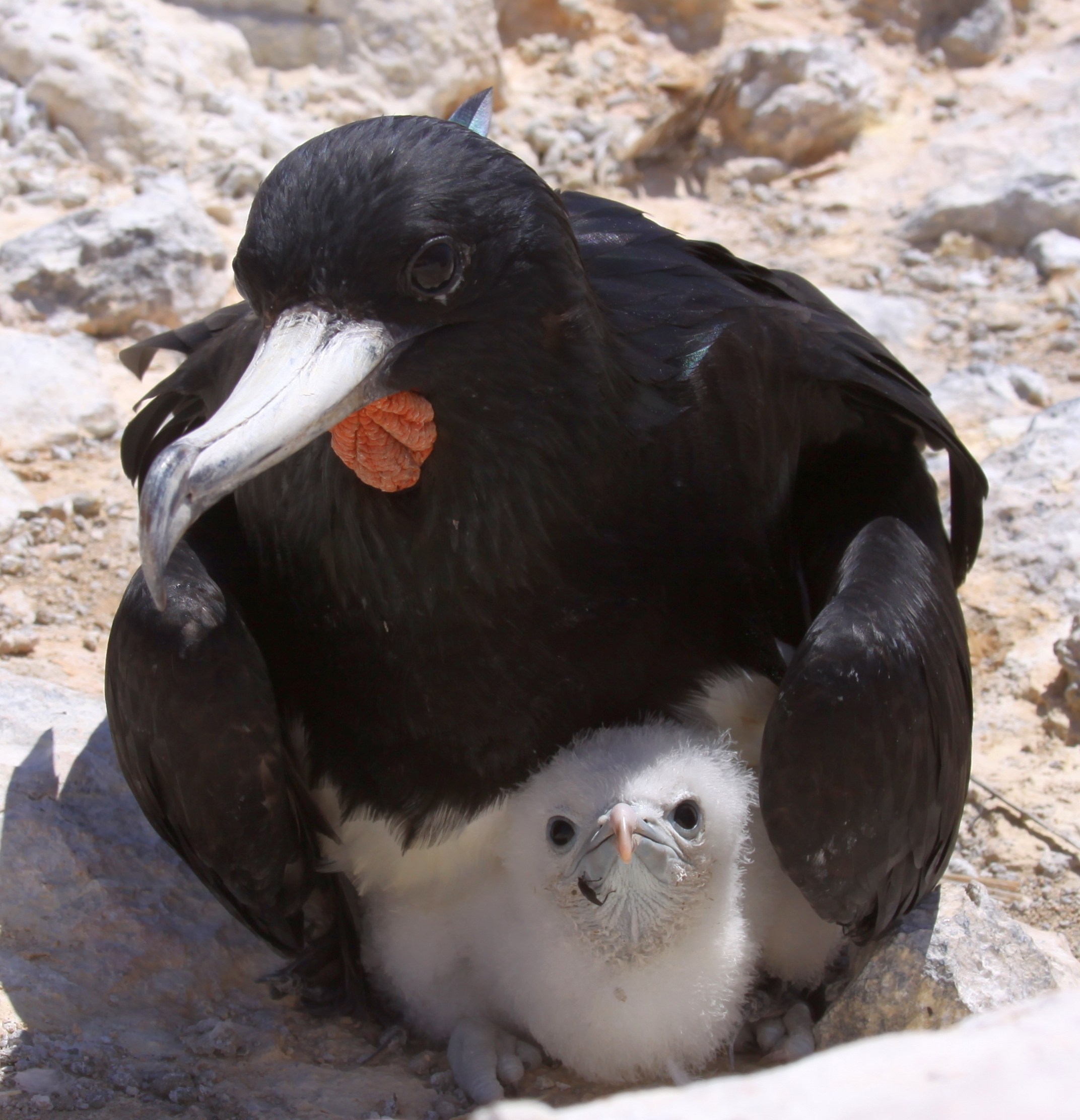
- Male with chick at Boatswain Bird Island

Conservation status
- Vulnerable (IUCN 3.1)

Scientific classification
- Kingdom: Animalia
- Phylum: Chordata
- Class: Aves
- Order: Suliformes
- Family: Fregatidae
- Genus: Fregata
- Species: F. aquila

Binomial name
- Fregata aquila (Linnaeus, 1758)

Synonyms
- Pelecanus aquilus Linnaeus, 1758

= Ascension frigatebird =

Species of bird

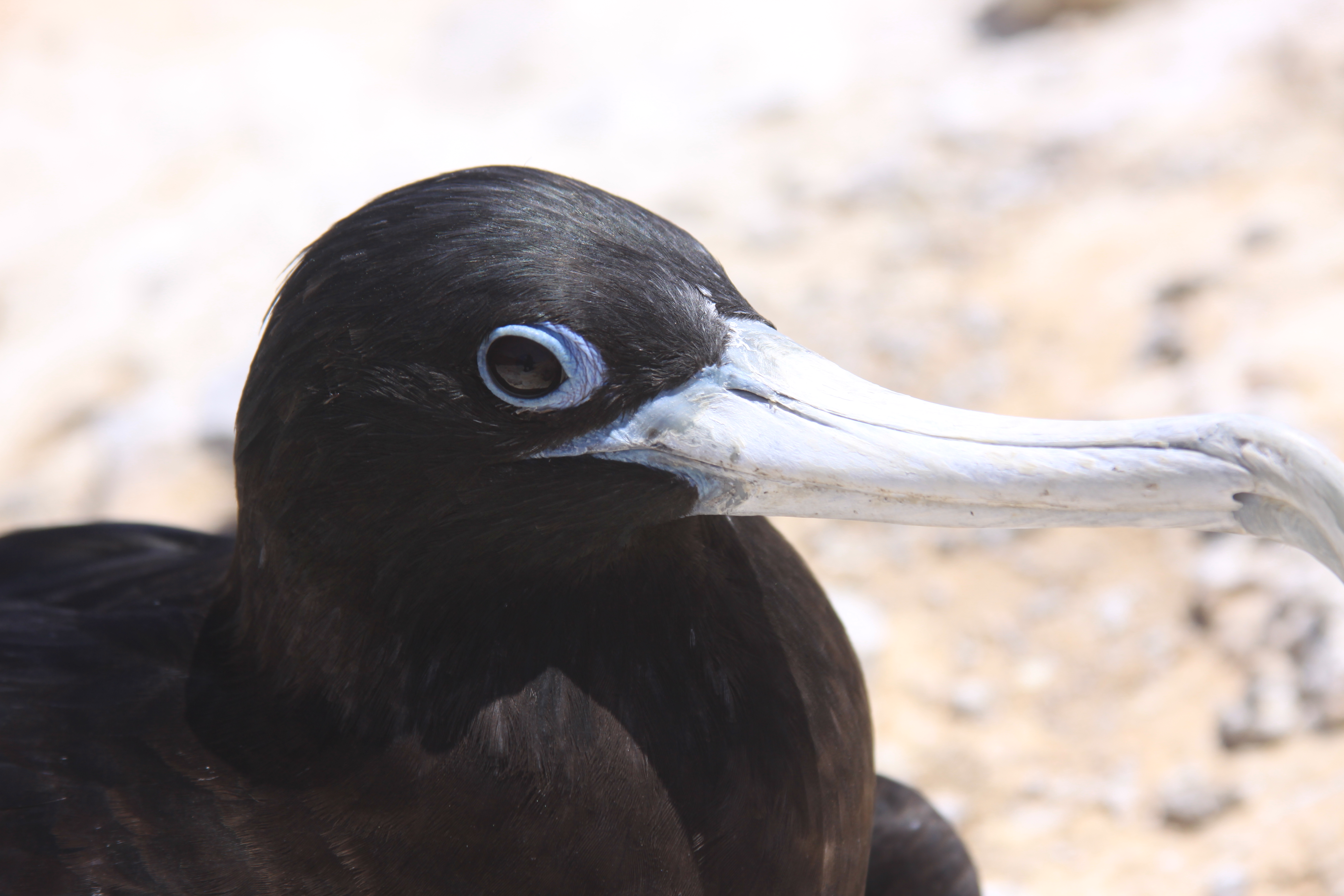
Adult female

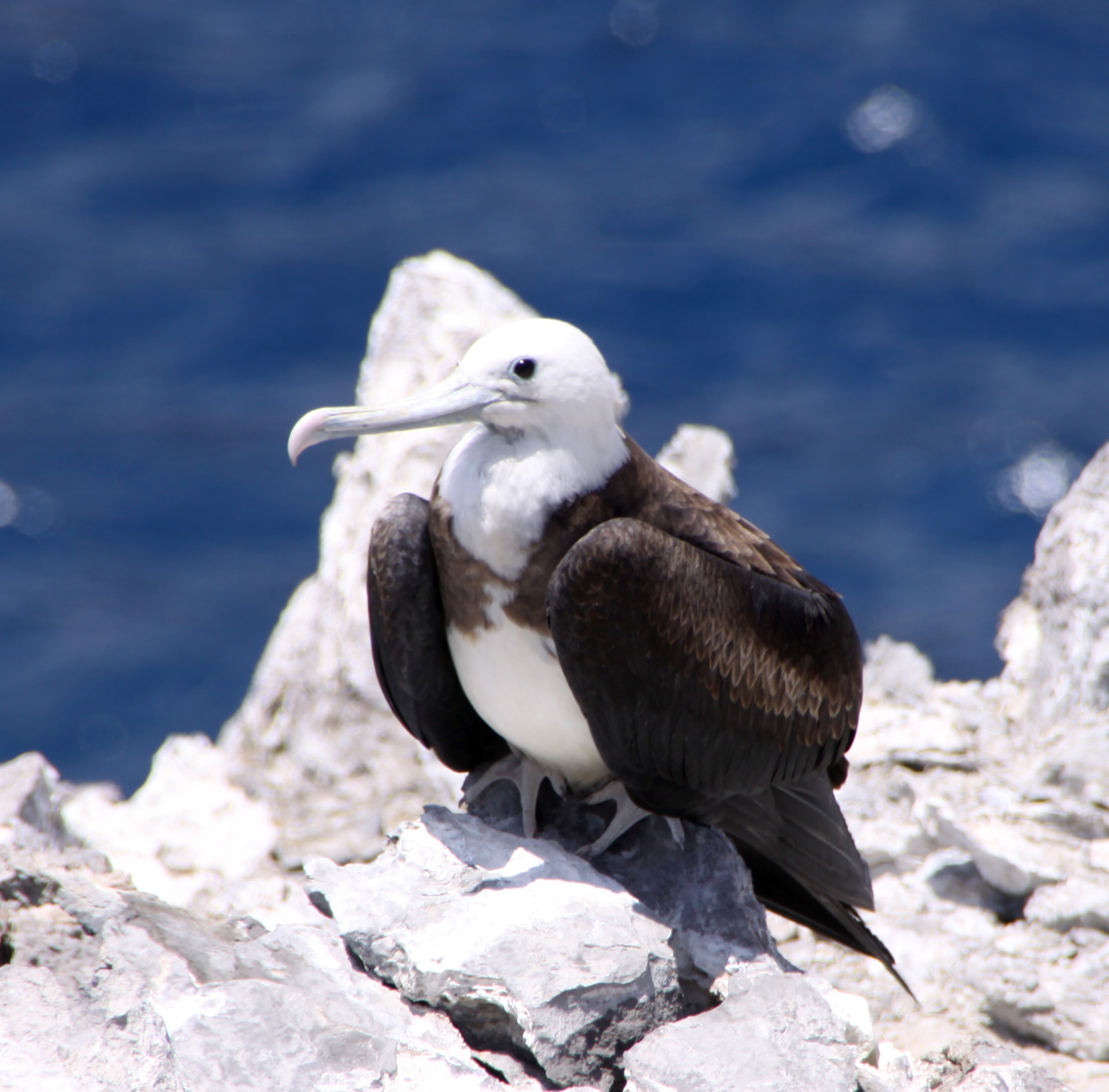
Juvenile

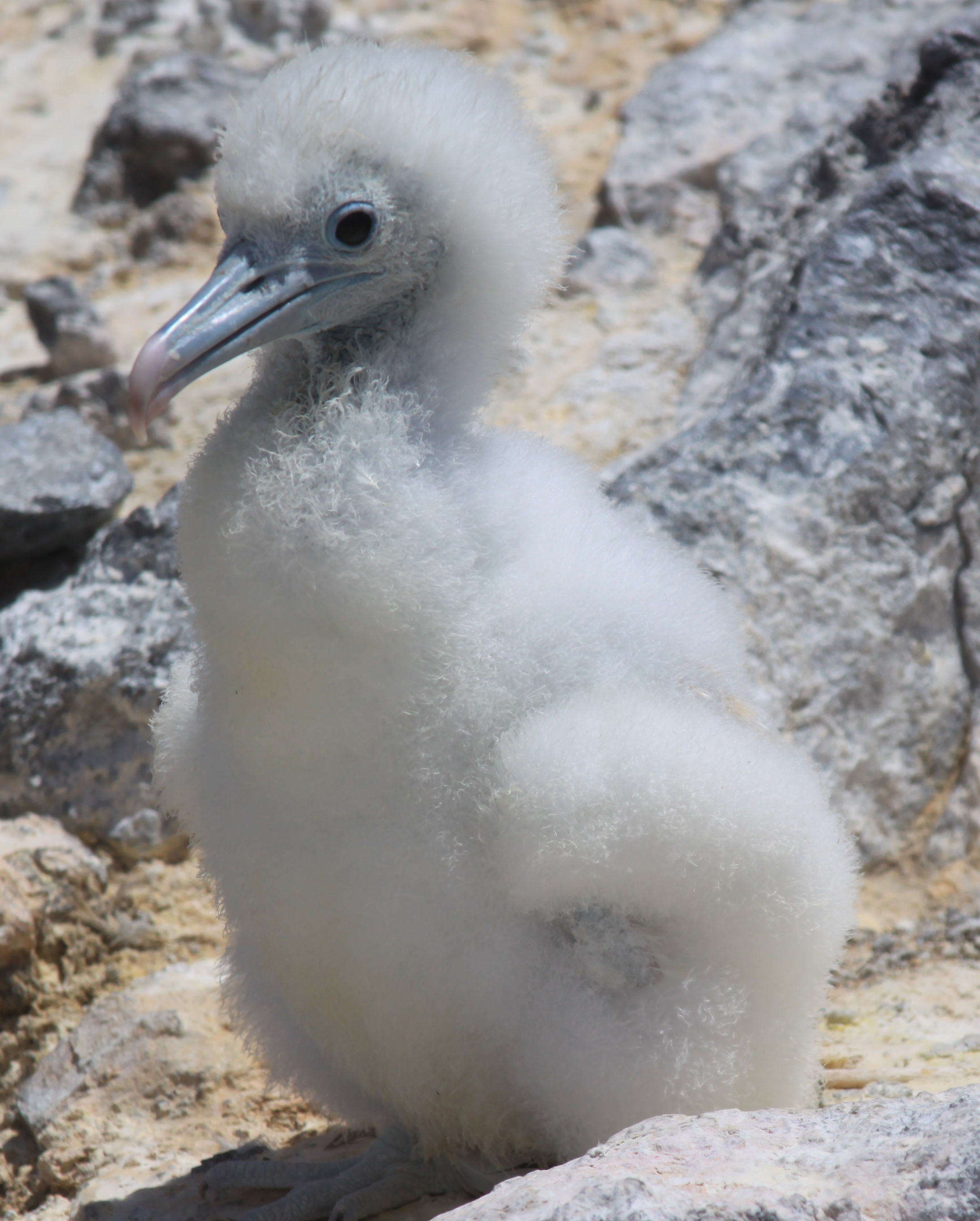
Chick

The Ascension frigatebird (Fregata aquila) is a seabird of the frigatebird family Fregatidae which breeds on Boatswain Bird Island and Ascension Island in the tropical Atlantic Ocean.

The Ascension frigatebird is a large lightly built seabird with brownish-black plumage and a deeply forked tail. It has a wingspan of around 2 m (6.6 ft). The male has a striking red gular sac which he inflates to attract a mate. The female is slightly larger than the male and has a brown breast-band and sometimes a white belly. They feed on fish taken in flight from the ocean's surface (mostly flying fish), and sometimes indulge in kleptoparasitism, harassing other birds to force them to regurgitate their food.

== Taxonomy ==
The Ascension frigatebird was described by Carl Linnaeus in his landmark 1758 10th edition of Systema Naturae under the binomial name Pelecanus aquilus. His specimen had been collected from the Ascension Island by the Swedish explorer Pehr Osbeck.

The names "frigatebird" and Fregata derive from the French mariners' name for the bird La Frégate, a frigate or fast warship. The specific aquila is Latin for an eagle, and refers to the dark plumage and rapacious habits.

The genus Fregata formerly included all four species of large frigatebirds but in 1914 the Australian ornithologist Gregory Mathews split off the other three species leaving Fregata aquila to denote the Ascension frigatebird. An analysis of ribosomal and mitochondrial DNA indicates that within the genus Fregata, the Ascension frigatebird is most closely related to the magnificent frigatebird.

== Description ==
The Ascension frigatebird is a dark coloured seabird with long slender pointed wings, a long deeply forked tail and a long hooked bill. It measures 89–96 cm (35–38 in) in length, has a wingspan of 196–201 cm (77–79 in) and weighs around 1,250 g (2.76 lb). Male birds are entirely black except for the nape, mantle and scapulars that are covered with elongated lanceolate feathers that have a green metallic sheen. The birds have a striking red gular sack that they inflate to attract a mate. Their bills are pale blueish grey, their eyes are dark brown with a black eye-ring and their legs are grey. Female birds are brownish black and lack the green lanceolate feathers. Birds with the more common dark morph have a brown panel on the front that stretches from the collar down to the chest. Their eye-rings and the base of the bill are pale blue. Birds with the pale morph have some white on their chest. It is possible that they are young breeding females that have not yet acquired the full adult plumage.

== Distribution ==
The bulk of the Ascension frigatebird population nests on a 3-hectare (7.4-acre) plateau on top of Boatswain Bird Island, which lies 250 m (270 yd) off the northeast coast of Ascension Island. The species formerly bred on Ascension Island itself, but the colonies were exterminated by feral cats introduced in 1815. A program conducted between 2002 and 2004 successfully eliminated all the feral cats and, as a result, two pairs of frigatebirds returned to nest on Ascension Island in 2012. In 2014 twelve nests were reported on Letterbox Peninsula at the extreme east end of the island.

As with other frigatebirds, its movements outside the breeding season are little known because of identification problems within this difficult group, but it occurs off West Africa. It feeds on fish and similar surface prey such as small turtles.

A juvenile frigatebird found dying in 1953 in Tiree, Scotland was identified at the time as magnificent frigatebird but the specimen was re-examined in 2002 and found to be an Ascension frigatebird. In July 2013 a juvenile was photographed at Bowmore on the island of Islay in Scotland. In late June 2014 one was tracked by satellite to within 100 nautical miles of the Brazilian island of Fernando de Noronha, some 200 miles from the South American mainland.

== Status ==
A census of the Ascension frigatebird population on the islet of Boatswain conducted in 2001–2002 recorded around 6,250 breeding females. As female frigatebirds normally only breed every other year, this implied a total population of 12,500 birds. This number is similar to an earlier estimate of between 8,000 and 10,000 birds obtained in a study conducted in 1957–1959. The species is classified as "vulnerable" by the International Union for Conservation of Nature as it breeds on just a single tiny island.
