= Boatswain Bird Island =

Island off the coast of Ascension Island

Boatswain Bird Island Sanctuary
- IUCN category Ia (strict nature reserve)
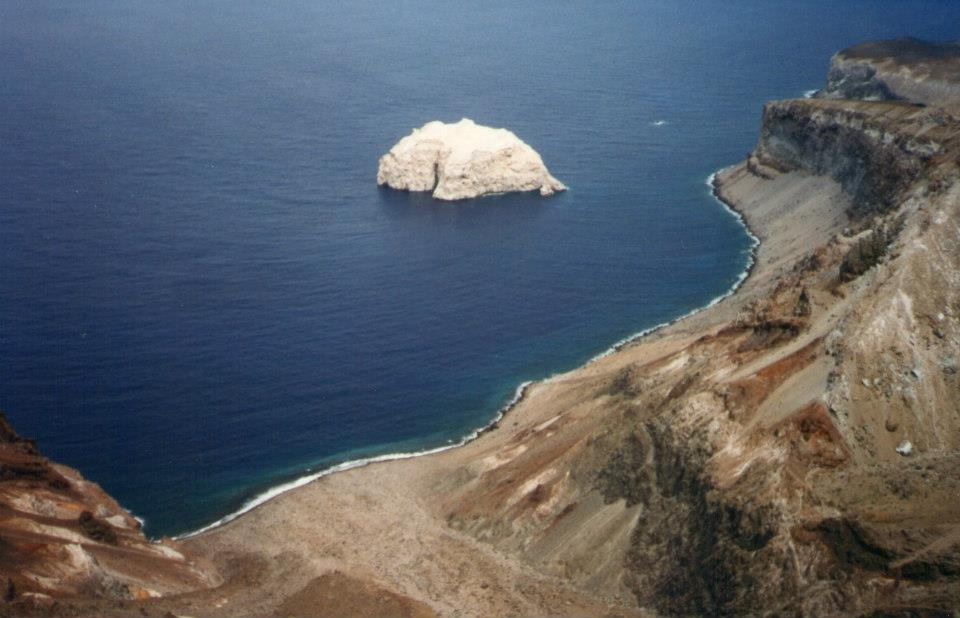
- Boatswain Bird Island Sanctuary

- Boatswain Bird Island is the small 5.3 ha (13 acres) island off the east coast of Ascension Island
- Location: Saint Helena, Ascension and Tristan da Cunha
- Coordinates: 7°56′09″S 14°18′27″W

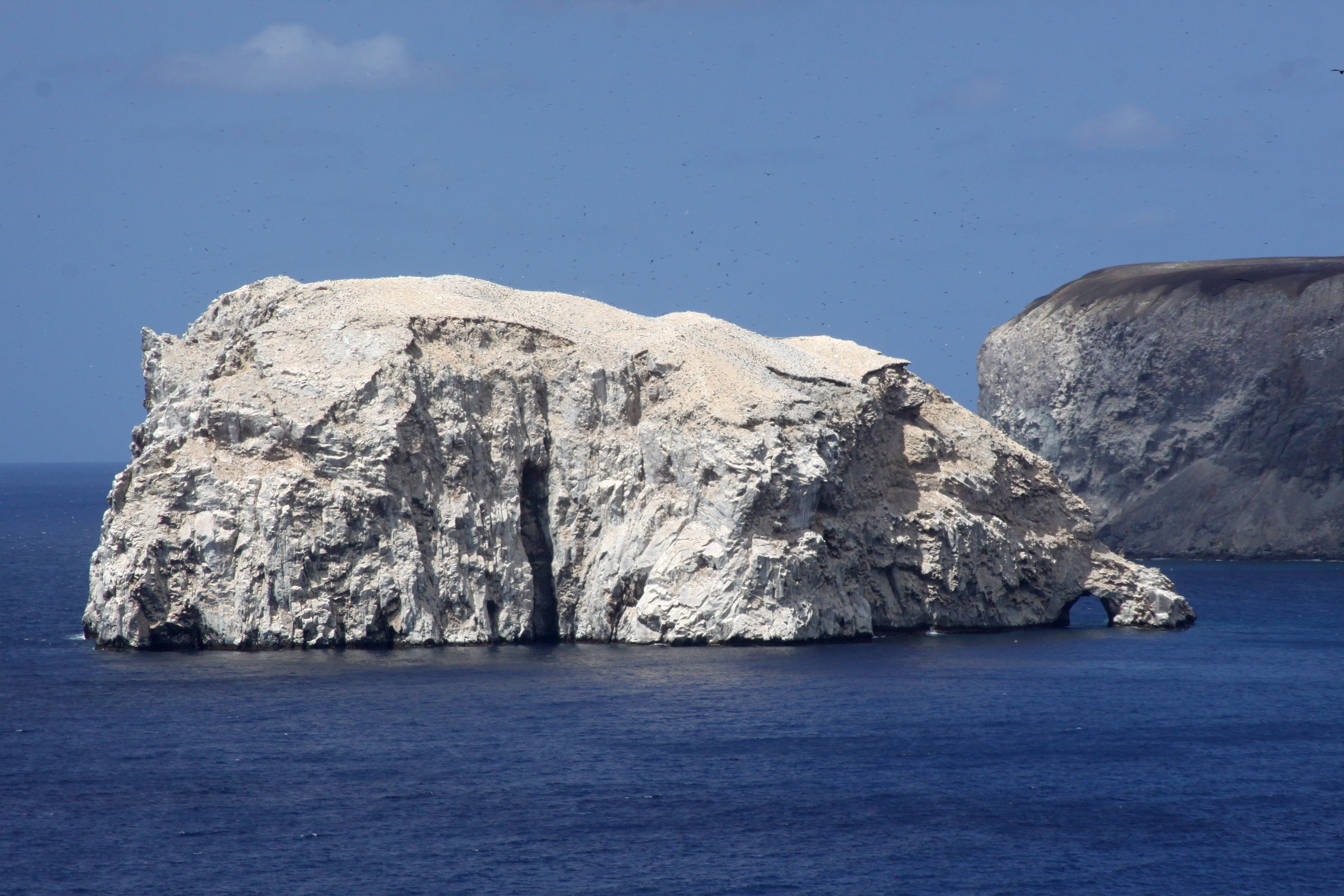
Guano-covered Boatswain Bird Island with natural arch at right

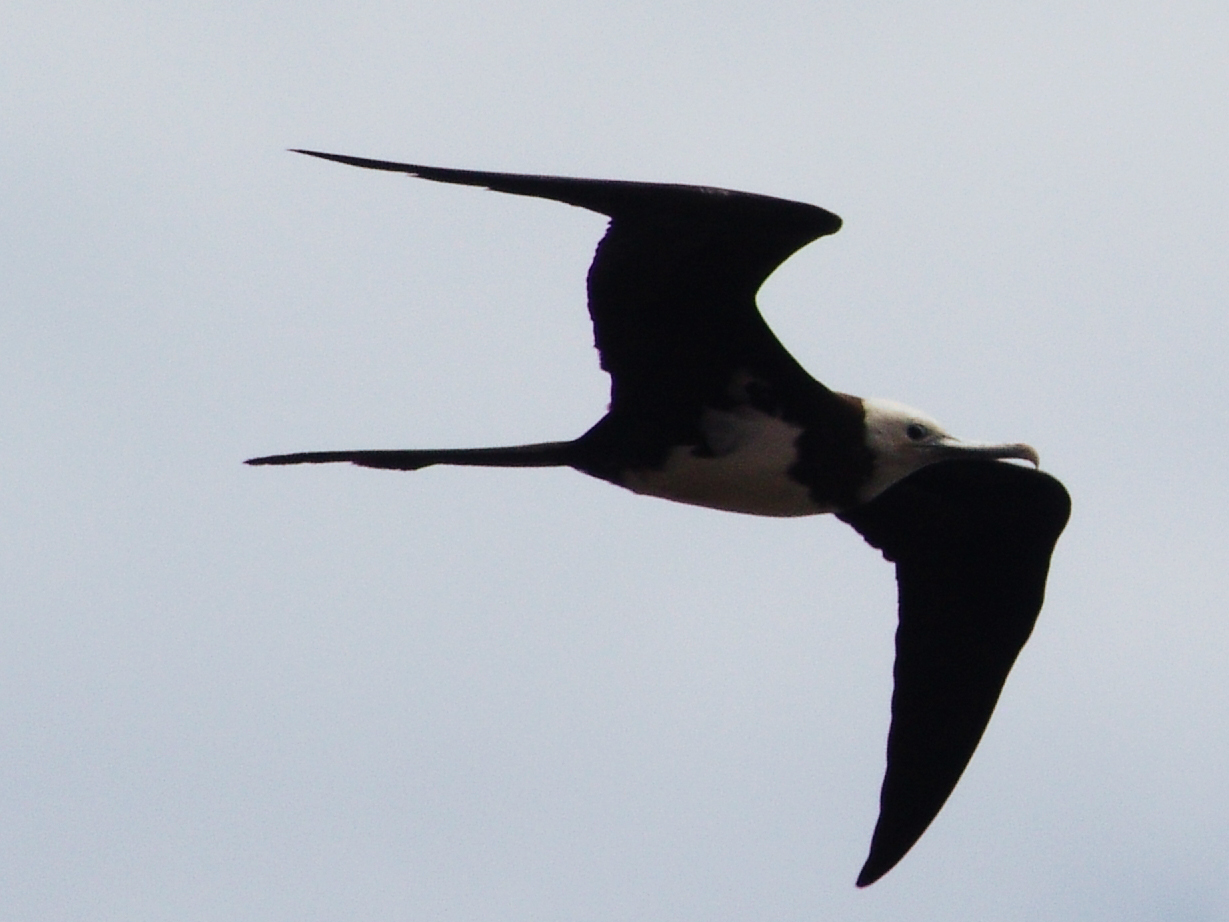
The island is the main breeding site of the Ascension frigatebird

Boatswain Bird Island, also spelt Boatswainbird Island, is a small island some 270 metres (300 yd) off the east coast of Ascension Island in the South Atlantic Ocean with an area of approximately 5.3 ha (13 acres). It is administered from Georgetown on Ascension, which is part of Saint Helena, Ascension and Tristan da Cunha, an overseas territory of the United Kingdom. Boatswain Bird Island should not be confused with the nearby, much smaller, Boatswain Bird Rock, only about 10 by 5 metres (33 by 16 ft) in size, located 570 metres (620 yd) south-east of the island and 360 metres (390 yd) north-east of the coast of Ascension. The southern coast of the island has an impressive natural arch.

== Birds ==
This tiny island has thousands of inhabitants, all birds, which give the island its white colour. Among the many seabirds nesting there are boobies, petrels, noddies, as well as the tropicbirds (boatswain birds) for which the island is named.

The island is home to the majority of Ascension's birds and their nests, which have been devastated by rats (accidentally introduced by passing ships) and cats (introduced to catch the rats, as well as to serve as pets). Since the mid-1990s, a feral cat eradication program, alongside a rat eradication program, has been implemented to encourage birds to return to the main island.

=== Important Bird Area ===
The island has been identified as an Important Bird Area (IBA) by BirdLife International as a breeding site for seabirds. Birds for which the IBA is significant include Madeiran storm petrels (1,500 breeding pairs), red-billed tropicbirds (500 pairs), white-tailed tropicbirds (1,000 pairs), Ascension frigatebirds (6,000 pairs), masked boobies (1,300 pairs) and black noddies (5,000 pairs).
