= List of populated places in Sakarya Province =

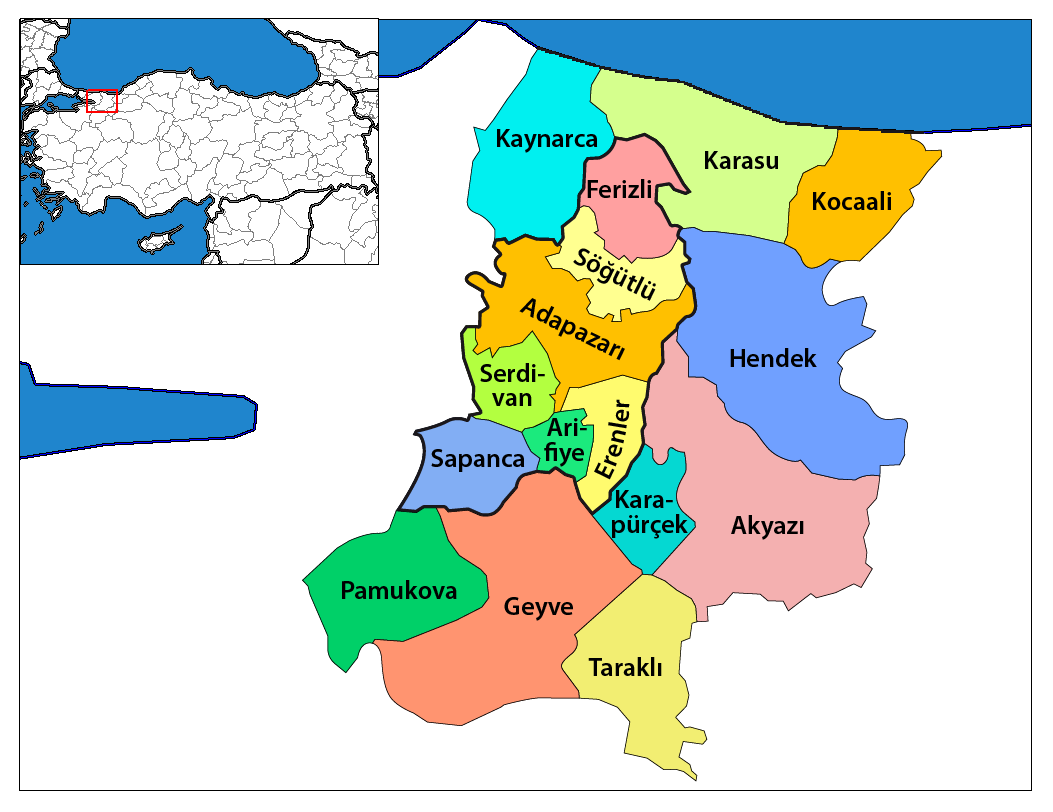
Sakarya Province

Below is the list of populated places in Sakarya Province of Turkey by the districts.

== Adapazarı ==
- Adapazarı
- 15 Temmuz Camili
- Abalı
- Acıelmalı
- Akıncılar
- Alandüzü
- Aşırlar
- Bağlar
- Bayraktar
- Bileciler
- Budaklar
- Büyükhataplı
- Çağlayan
- Çaltıcak
- Çamyolu
- Çelebiler
- Çerçiler
- Çökekler
- Çukurahmediye
- Cumhuriyet
- Dağdibi
- Demirbey
- Doğancılar
- Elmalı
- Evren
- Göktepe
- Güllük
- Hacılar
- Hacıramazanlar
- Harmantepe
- Hızırtepe
- İkizce Müslüm
- İkizce Osmaniye
- İlyaslar
- Işıklar
- İstiklal
- Karadavutlu
- Karadere
- Karakamış
- Karaköy
- Karaman
- Karaosman
- Karapınar
- Kasımlar
- Kavaklıorman
- Kayrancık
- Kışla
- Kömürlük
- Köprübaşı
- Korucuk
- Küçükhataplı
- Kurtbeyler
- Kurtuluş
- Mahmudiye
- Maltepe
- Merkez
- Mithatpaşa
- Nasuhlar
- Örentepe
- Orta
- Ozanlar
- Pabuççular
- Poyrazlar
- Rüstemler
- Sakarya
- Salmanlı
- Şeker
- Semerciler
- Şirinevler
- Solaklar
- Süleymanbey
- Taşkısığı
- Taşlık
- Tekeler
- Tepekum
- Tığcılar
- Turnadere
- Tuzla
- Yağcılar
- Yahyalar
- Yenicami
- Yenidoğan
- Yenigün
- Yenimahalle
- Yeşilyurt

== Akyazı ==
- Akyazı
- Akbalık
- Alaağaç
- Altındere Cumhuriyet
- Altındere Gündoğan
- Altındere Osmanağa
- Ballıkaya
- Batakköy
- Bedil Kazancı
- Bedilkadirbey
- Bediltahirbey
- Beldibi
- Bıçkıdere
- Boztepe
- Buğdaylı
- Çakıroğlu
- Çatalköprü
- Çıldırlar
- Cumhuriyet
- Cumhuriyet (Küçücek)
- Dedeler
- Dokurcun Çaylar Yeni Mahalle
- Dokurcun Çengeller
- Dokurcun Kuloğlu
- Durmuşlar
- Düzyazı
- Erdoğdu
- Eskibedil
- Fatih
- G. Süleymanpaşa
- Gebeş
- Gökçeler
- Güvençler
- Güzlek
- Hanyatak
- Harunusta
- Hasanbey
- Hastane
- Haydarlar
- İnönü
- Kabakulak
- Karaçalılık
- Kepekli
- Kızılcıkorman
- Konuralp
- Küçücek İstiklal
- Kumköprü
- Kuzuluk Ortamahalle
- Kuzuluk Şose
- Kuzuluk Topçusırtı
- Madenler
- Mansurlar
- Merkez Yeniköy
- Ömercikler
- Osmanbey
- Pazarköy
- Reşadiye
- Salihiye
- Şerefiye
- Seyfeler
- Sukenarı
- Taşağıl
- Taşburun
- Taşyatak
- Topağaç
- Türkormanköy
- Uzunçınar
- Vakıf
- Yağcılar
- Yahyalı
- Yeni
- Yenidoğan
- Yeniorman
- Yongalık
- Yörükyeri
- Yunusemre
- Yuvalık

== Arifiye ==
- Arifiye
- Adliye
- Ahmediye
- Arifbey
- Aşağı Kirazca
- Boğazköy
- Çaybaşıfuadiye
- Çınardibi
- Cumhuriyet
- Fatih
- Hacıköy
- Hanlı Merkez
- Hanlı Sakarya
- Hanlıköy
- Karaaptiler
- Karaçomaklar
- Kemaliye
- Kirazca
- Kışlaçay
- Kumbaşı
- Mollaköy
- Neviye
- Semerciler
- Türkçaybaşı
- Yukarıkirazca

== Erenler ==
- Erenler
- Alancuma
- Bağlar
- Bekirpaşa
- Büyükesence
- Çaybaşıyeniköy
- Çaykışla
- Değirmendere
- Dilmen
- Ekinli
- Emirler
- Epçeller
- Erenler
- Hacıoğlu
- Hasanbey
- Horozlar
- Hürriyet
- Kamışlı
- Kayalarmemduhiye
- Kayalarreşitbey
- Kozluk
- Küçükesence
- Küpçüler
- Nakışlar
- Pirahmatler
- Sarıcalar
- Şeyhköy
- Şükriye
- Tabakhane
- Tepe
- Tuapsalar
- Yazılı
- Yenimahalle
- Yeşiltepe

== Ferizli ==
- Ferizli
- Abdürrezzak
- Ağacık
- Akçukur
- Bakırlı
- Ceylandere
- Damlık
- Değirmencik
- Devlet
- Doğancı
- Gölkent
- Hocaoğlu
- İnönü
- İstiklal
- Karadiken
- Kemalpaşa
- Kuzca
- Nalköy
- Osmanağa Çiftliği
- Sarıahmetler
- Seyifler
- Sinanoğlu
- Teberik
- Tokat
- Yeni

== Geyve ==
- Geyve
- Ahibaba
- Akdoğan
- Akıncı
- Akkaya
- Alifuatpaşa
- Alıplar
- Aydınlar
- Bağcaz
- Bağlarbaşı
- Bayat
- Belpınar
- Bozören
- Burhaniye
- Camikebir
- Çamlık
- Çayköy
- Ceceler
- Çeltikler
- Çengel
- Çine
- Çukurköy
- Demirler
- Dereköy
- Doğançay
- Doğancıl
- Doğantepe
- Düzakçaşehir
- Epçeler
- Esenköy
- Eşme
- Fındıksuyu
- Gazisüleyman Paşa
- Güney
- Günhoşlar
- Hacılar
- Hacıosmanlar
- Halidiye
- Hırka
- Hisarlık
- Ihsaniye
- Ilıcaköy
- İlimbey
- İnciksuyu
- Kamışlı
- Karaçam
- Karacaören
- Kızılkaya
- Köprübaşı
- Koru
- Kozan
- Kulfallar
- Maksudiye
- Melekşeoruç
- Melekşesolak
- Nuruosmaniye
- Örencik
- Orhaniye
- Poydular
- Sabırlar
- Safibey
- Saraçlı
- Sarıgazi
- Şehren
- Sekiharman
- Şerefiye
- Setçe
- Suçatı
- Sütalan
- Taşoluk
- Tepecikler
- Umurbey
- Yaylak
- Yörükler

== Hendek ==
- Hendek
- Akarca
- Akçayır
- Akova
- Akpınar
- Aksu
- Aktefek
- Aşağıçalıca
- Bakacak
- Balıklıihsaniye
- Başpınar
- Bayraktepe
- Beyköy
- Beylice
- Bıçkıatik
- Büyükdere
- Çakallık
- Çamlıca
- Çayırbaşı
- Çiftlik
- Çobanyatak
- Çukurhan
- Dereboğazı
- Dereköy
- Dikmen
- Esentepe
- Eskibıçkı
- Göksu
- Güldibi
- Gündoğan
- Güney
- Hacıkışla
- Hacımbey
- Hallaç
- Hamitli
- Harmantepe
- Hicriye
- Hüseyinşeyh
- İkbaliye
- İkramiye
- Kadifekale
- Kahraman
- Kalayık
- Karadere
- Karatoprak
- Kargalı Hanbaba
- Kargalıyeniköy
- Kazımiye
- Kemaliye
- Kırktepe
- Kızanlık
- Kocaahmetler
- Kocatöngel
- Köprübaşı
- Kurtköy
- Kurtuluş
- Lütfiyeköşk
- Mahmutbey
- Martinler
- Muradiye
- Necatipaşa
- Nuriye
- Paşaköy
- Pınarlı
- Puna Ortaköy
- Rasimpaşa
- Sarıdede
- Sarıyer
- Servetiye
- Şeyhler
- Sivritepe
- Sofular
- Soğuksu
- Sukenarı
- Süleymaniye
- Sümbüllü
- Turanlar
- Türbe
- Tuzak
- Uzuncaorman
- Uzunçarşı
- Yağbasan
- Yarıca
- Yayalar
- Yeni
- Yeniköy
- Yeniyayla
- Yeşilköy
- Yeşiller
- Yeşilvadi
- Yeşilyurt
- Yukarıçalıca
- Yukarıhüseyinşeyh

== Karapürçek ==
- Karapürçek
- Ahmediye
- Ahmetler
- Çeşmebaşı
- Cumhuriyet
- Hocaköy
- İnönü
- Kanlıçay
- Kızılbayır
- Küçükkarapürçek
- Mecidiye
- Meşepınarı
- Mesudiye
- Yazılıgürgen
- Yüksel

== Karasu ==
- Karasu
- Adatepe
- Akkum
- Ardıçbeli
- Aziziye
- Camitepe
- Çatalövez
- Darıçayırı
- Denizköy
- Gölköprü
- Hürriyet
- İhsaniye
- İncilli
- Kabakoz
- Kancalar
- Karamüezzinler
- Karanlıkdere
- Karapınar
- Karasu
- Kızılcık
- Konacık
- Kurudere
- Kurumeşe
- Kuyumcullu
- Kuzuluk
- Limandere
- Manavpınarı
- Ortaköy
- Paralı
- Resuller
- Subatağı
- Taşlıgeçit
- Tepetarla
- Tuzla
- Üçoluk
- Yalı
- Yassıgeçit
- Yeni
- Yenidoğan
- Yeşilköy
- Yuvalıdere

== Kaynarca ==
- Kaynarca
- Akbaşlı
- Arifağa
- Başoğlu
- Birlik
- Büyükyanık
- Cebek
- Dudu
- Eğrioğlu
- Gaziler
- Gölce
- Gürpınar
- Güven
- Hatipler
- İmamlar
- İşaret
- Kalburcu
- Karaçalı
- Karamanlar
- Kayacık
- Kertil
- Kırktepe
- Kızılcaali
- Konak
- Küçükkaynarca
- Küçükkışla
- Kulaklı
- Merkez Mahalle
- Müezzinler
- Okçular
- Ömerağa
- Orta Mahalle
- Ortaköy
- Osmanlı
- Sabırlı
- Sarıbeyli
- Şeyhtımarı
- Taşoluk
- Topçu
- Turnalı
- Uğurlu
- Uzakkışla
- Uzunalan
- Yeniçam
- Yeşilova
- Ziahmet

== Kocaali ==
- Kocaali
- Açmabaşı
- Ağalar
- Akpınar
- Aktaş
- Alandere
- Aydoğan
- Beyler
- Bezirgan
- Caferiye
- Çakmaklı
- Çukurköy
- Demiraçma
- Görele
- Gümüşoluk
- Hızar
- Kadıköy
- Karalar
- Karapelit
- Karşı
- Kestanepınarı
- Kirazlı
- Kızılüzüm
- Koğutpelit
- Köyyeri
- Kozluk
- Küplük
- Melen
- Merkez
- Selahiye
- Şerbetpınar
- Süngüt
- Yalı
- Yalpankaya
- Yanıksayvant
- Yayla
- Yeni

== Pamukova ==
- Pamukova
- Ağaççılar
- Ahılar
- Akçakaya
- Bacıköy
- Bakacak
- Bayırakçaşehir
- Çardak
- Cihadiye
- Çilekli
- Cumhuriyet
- Eğriçay
- Elperek
- Eskiyayla
- Fevziye
- Gökgöz
- Gonca
- Hayrettin
- Hüseyinli
- İsabalı
- Kadıköy
- Karapınar
- Kazımiye
- Kemaliye
- Mekece
- Oruçlu
- Özbek
- Paşalar
- Pınarlı
- Şahmelek
- Şeyhvarmaz
- Teşvikiye
- Turgutlu
- Yenice

== Sapanca ==
- Sapanca
- Akçay
- Balkaya
- Camicedit
- Çayiçi
- Fevziye
- Gazipaşa
- Göl
- Güldibi
- Hacımercan
- İkramiye
- İlmiye
- İstanbuldere
- Kırkpınar Hasanpaşa
- Kırkpınar Soğuksu
- Kırkpınar Tepebaşı
- Kurtköy Dibektaş
- Kurtköy Fatih
- Kurtköy Yavuzselim
- Kuruçeşme
- Mahmudiye
- Memnuniye
- Muradiye
- Nailiye
- Rüstempaşa
- Şükriye
- Ünlüce
- Uzunkum
- Yanık
- Yenimahalle

== Serdivan ==
- Serdivan
- 32 Evler
- Arabacıalanı
- Aralık
- Aşağıdereköy
- Bahçelievler
- Beşevler
- Beşköprü
- Çubuklu
- Dağyoncalı
- Esentepe
- Hamitabat
- İstiklal
- Kazımpaşa
- Kemalpaşa
- Kızılcıklı
- Köprübaşı
- Kuruçeşme
- Meşeli
- Reşadiye
- Selahiye
- Uzunköy
- Vatan
- Yazlık
- Yukarıdereköy

== Söğütlü ==
- Söğütlü
- Akarca
- Akçakamış
- Akgöl
- Beşdeğirmen
- Camicedid
- Fındıklı
- Gündoğan
- Hasanfakı
- İmamlar
- Kantar
- Karateke
- Küçüksöğütlü
- Kurudil
- Levent
- Mağara
- Maksudiye
- Orta
- Rüstemler
- Sıraköy
- Soğucak
- Tokmaklıdere
- Türkbeylikkışla
- Yeniköy

== Taraklı ==
- Taraklı
- Akçapınar
- Aksu
- Alballar
- Avdan
- Çamtepe
- Dışdedeler
- Duman
- Esenyurt
- Hacıaliler
- Hacımurat
- Hacıyakup
- Harkköy
- İçdedeler
- Kemaller
- Mahdumlar
- Pirler
- Tuzla
- Uğurlu
- Ulucami
- Yenidoğan
- Yeniköy
- Yusufbey
