= List of municipalities in Sakarya Province =

This is the List of municipalities in Sakarya Province, Turkey as of October 2007.

== Municipalities ==
List is sorted alphabetically A-Z, as Districts->Municipalities.

District	Municipality
Adapazarı (Merkez)	Adapazarı
Adapazarı	Arifiye
Adapazarı	Bekirpaşa
Adapazarı	Çaybaşıyeniköy
Adapazarı	Erenler
Adapazarı	Güneşler
Adapazarı	Hanlı
Adapazarı	Kazımpaşa
Adapazarı	Nehirkent
Adapazarı	Serdivan
Adapazarı	Yazlık
Akyazı	Akyazı
Akyazı	Altındere
Akyazı	Dokurcun
Akyazı	Gücücek
Akyazı	Kuzuluk
Ferizli	Ferizli
Ferizli	Gölkent
Ferizli	Sinanoğlu
Geyve	Alifuatpaşa
Geyve	Geyve
Hendek	Çamlıca
Hendek	Hendek
Hendek	Yeşilyurt
Karapürçek	Karapürçek
Karasu	Darıçayırı
Karasu	Karasu
Karasu	Kurudere
Karasu	Limandere
Karasu	Yuvalıdere
Kaynarca	Kaynarca
Kocaali	Kocaali
Kocaali	Ortaköy
Pamukova	Pamukova
Sapanca	Kırkpınar
Sapanca	Kurtköy
Sapanca	Sapanca
Söğütlü	Söğütlü
Taraklı	Taraklı

== Changes in 2014 ==
According to Law act no 6360, belde (town) municipalities within provinces with more than 750000 population (so called Metropolitan municipalities in Turkey) were abolished as of 30 March 2014. 12 belde municipalities in the above list are now defunct. The list is kept for historical reference.
