= Sakarya University of Applied Sciences =

Public university in Sakarya, Turkey

Sakarya University of Applies Sciences
- Sakarya Uygulamalı Bilimler Üniversitesi
- Motto: Bilgiyi beceriyle bütünleştiriyoruz
- Motto in English: Integrating knowledge with skill
- Type: Public
- Established: 2018
- Vice-president: Sinan Serdar Özkan; Ali Fuat Boz; Naci Çağlar
- Rector: Mehmet Sarıbıyık
- Academic staff: 469
- Administrative staff: 165
- Students: 24283
- Location: Sakarya, Turkey
- Language: Turkish
- Colors: Blue and Green
- Website: subu.edu.tr/en

Sakarya University of Applied Sciences (Turkish: Sakarya Uygulamalı Bilimler Üniversitesi), was established with the Decree Law published in the Official Gazette dated 18 May 2018. The school has 1 institute, 8 faculties, 1 college and 15 vocational schools. These units were affiliated to Sakarya University before the university was established. In addition, the University of Applied Sciences is one of two universities in Turkey.

== Academic Units ==
=== Institute ===
- Institute of Master Studies

=== Fakülteler ===
- Faculty of Sport Sciences
- Faculty of Technology
- Faculty of Tourism
- Faculty of Applies Sciences
- Western Black Sea Faculty of Marine Sciences
- Faculty of Health Sciences
- Faculty of Transport and Logistics
- Ali Fuat Paşa Faculty of Agricultural Sciences and Technologies

=== Schools ===
- School of Foreign Languages

=== Vocational Schools ===
- Vocational School of Akyazı
- Vocational School of Arifiye
- Vocational School of Ferizli
- Vocational School of Geyve
- Vocational School of Hendek
- Vocational School of Karasu
- Vocational School of Karapürçek
- Vocational School of Kaynarca Seyfettin Selim
- Vocational School of Kocaali
- Vocational School of Pamukova
- Vocational School of Sakarya (Adapazarı)
- Vocational School of Sapanca
- Vocational School Sapanca Tourism
- Vocational School of Söğütlü
- Vocational School of Taraklı

== Professional Application Management System (MUYS) ==
Thanks to the system created by the university to manage professional practices, it applies a 3 + 1 education model for Vocational Schools and 7 + 1 education for faculties. In addition, the system helps the student to provide job opportunities.
