= Black Sea shad =

Black Sea shad is a common name for several fish in the genus Alosa which occur in the Black Sea and may refer to:

- Alosa immaculata
- Alosa maeotica
- Alosa tanaica
