= Azov shad =

Azov shad is a common name for several fishes and may refer to:

- Alosa maeotica
- Alosa tanaica
