= Doğançay Waterfall =

Waterfall in Sakarya Province, northwestern Turkey

Doğançay Waterfall Doğançay Şelalesi
- Location within Turkey
- Location: Sakarya Province, Turkey
- Coordinates: 40°36′00″N 30°22′18″E

Doğançay Waterfall (Turkish: Doğançay Şelalesi) is a waterfall in Sakarya Province, northwestern Turkey. It is a registered natural monument of the country.

The waterfall is located in Maksudiye village of Geyve district in Sakarya Province. It is 35 km (22 mi) far from Adapazarı and 10 km (6.2 mi) from the Sakarya-Bilecik highway D.650.

On May 13, 2013, the waterfall and its surroundings covering an area of 42.33 da (4,556 sq ft), was registered as natural monument of the country by the Nature Reserve and Nature Parks Administration of the Ministry of Forest and Water Management.

== See also ==
- List of waterfalls
- List of waterfalls in Turkey
