= Balkaya, Sapanca =

Balkaya
- Neighbourhood
- Location in Turkey Balkaya (Marmara)
- Coordinates: 40.6657°N 30.2531°E
- Country: Turkey
- Province: Sakarya
- District: Sapanca
- Population (2022): 683
- Time zone: UTC+3 (TRT)

Balkaya is a neighbourhood of the municipality and district of Sapanca, Sakarya Province, Turkey. Its population is 683 (2022). It is located about 70 mi (110 km) southeast of Istanbul, and about 5 mi (8 km) south of Lake Sapanca.
