= Yörükler, Geyve =

Yörükler
- Neighbourhood
- Location in Turkey Yörükler (Marmara)
- Coordinates: 40°30′11″N 30°18′0″E
- Country: Turkey
- Province: Sakarya
- District: Geyve
- Population (2022): 3,949
- Time zone: UTC+3 (TRT)

Yörükler is a neighbourhood of the municipality and district of Geyve, Sakarya Province, Turkey. Its population is 3,949 (2022).

== Population ==
Historical population
Year	Pop.	±% p.a.
2007	3,410	—
2012	3,745	+1.89%
2017	3,848	+0.54%
2022	3,949	+0.52%
Source: TÜIK (2007-2022)
