= Sapanca =

- District and municipality
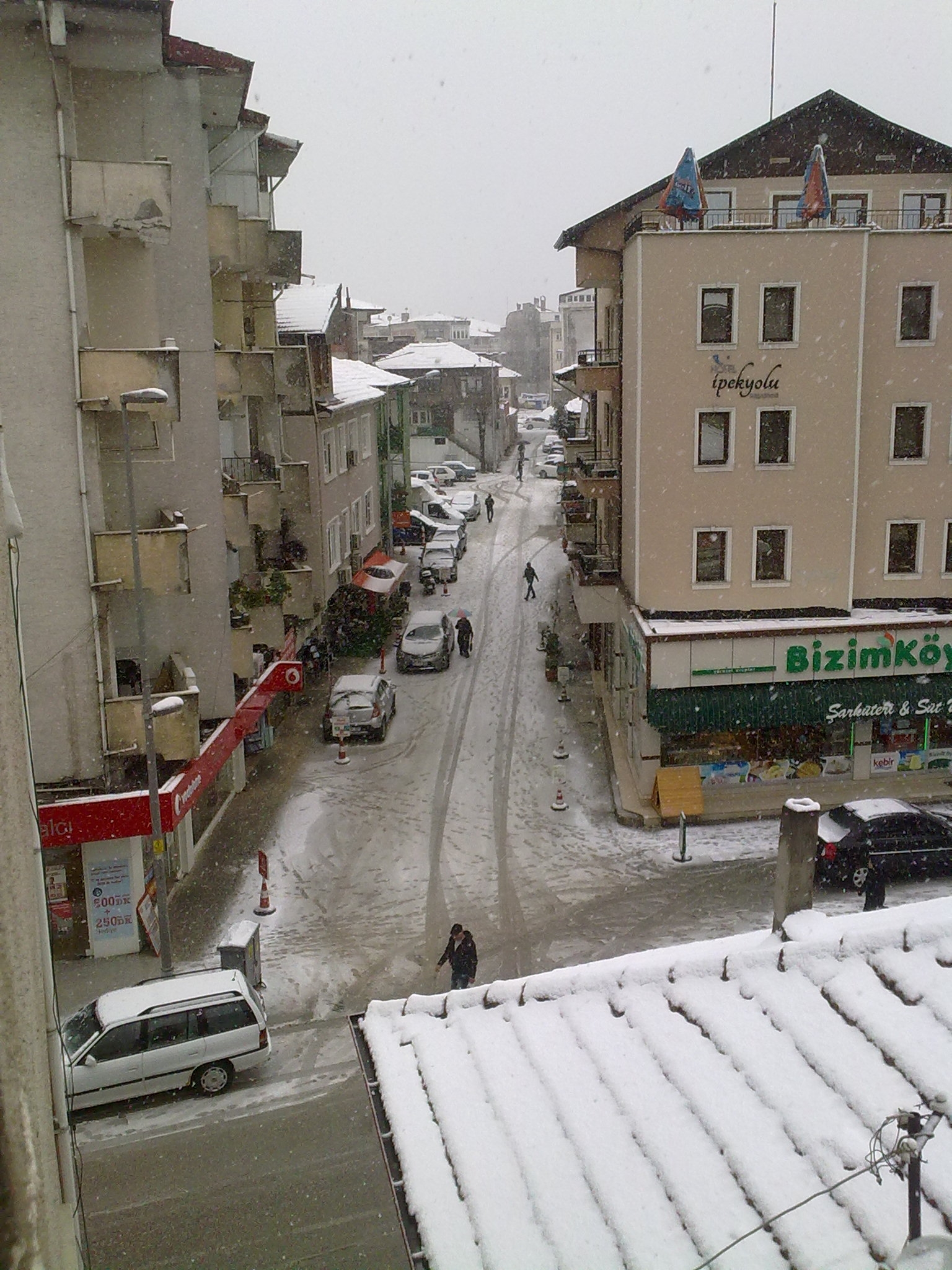
- Sapanca city center

- Logo

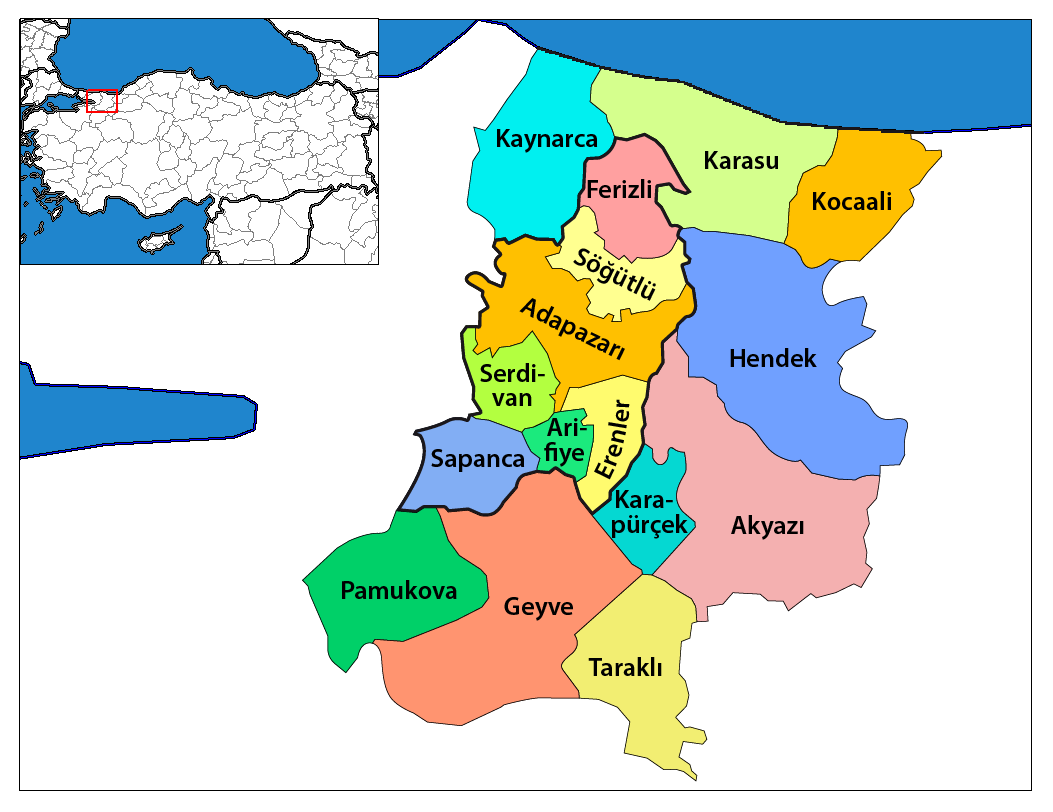
- Map showing Sapanca District in Sakarya Province

- Location within Turkey Location within Marmara
- Coordinates: 40°41′26″N 30°16′13″E
- Country: Turkey
- Province: Sakarya

Government
  - Mayor: Nihat Arda Şahin (CHP)
- Area: 173 km^{2} (67 sq mi)
- Population (2024): 46,847
  - Density: 271/km^{2} (701/sq mi)
- Time zone: UTC+3 (TRT)
- Postal code: 54600
- Area code: 0264
- Climate: Cfa
- Website: www.sapanca.bel.tr

Sapanca is a municipality and district of Sakarya Province, Turkey. Its area is 173 km^{2}, and its population is 46,847 (2024). It lies on the south bank of Lake Sapanca. The town's mayor is Nihat Arda Şahin (CHP).

Sapanca has recently become a tourist destination, due to its natural environment and its lake, as well as its proximity to Istanbul and the city of İzmit, also known as Kocaeli. The town has a number of hotels and resorts.

== Composition ==
There are 29 neighbourhoods in Sapanca District:

- Akçay
- Balkaya
- Camicedit
- Çayiçi
- Fevziye
- Gazipaşa
- Göl
- Güldibi
- Hacımercan
- İkramiye
- İlmiye
- İstanbuldere
- Kırkpınar Hasanpaşa
- Kırkpınar Soğuksu
- Kırkpınar Tepebaşı
- Kurtköy Dibektaş
- Kurtköy Fatih
- Kurtköy Yavuzselim
- Kuruçeşme
- Mahmudiye
- Memnuniye
- Muradiye
- Nailiye
- Rüstempaşa
- Şükriye
- Ünlüce
- Uzunkum
- Yanık
- Yenimahalle

== History ==
According to known written records, Sapanca is mentioned as a settlement with the arrival of the Phrygians in the region in 1200 BC, but it was truly founded by the Kingdom of Bithynia in 378 BC. The name Siphonensis Lacus was first used in a Laz source from the year 391. During the Eastern Roman Empire period, it was known as Buanes, Sofhan, and Sofhange.

With the arrival of the Anatolian Seljuks in 1075, the region began to be referred to as Ayan and Ayanköy. After the Crusades, the region passed back to the Byzantines. In 1640, Evliya Çelebi, who passed through the town on his way to Erzurum, provides the following information about the town:

- "An old man from Izmit once cleared the forests and thickets here and plowed the land, thus a village named after Sabancı Koca was established. Later, over time, it became prosperous and turned into a town during the time of Kanuni Sultan Süleyman."

In the town, Sarı Rüstem Pasha built a caravanserai with 170 hearths. It has a mosque, a bath, and a bazaar. Its public soup kitchens are covered with lead. There are about 1000 houses covered with tiles. All the public soup kitchens are works of Mimar Sinan. Another work by Mimar Sinan is the Pertev Pasha Inn. Since most of this work belongs to Rüstem Pasha, it is managed by the trustee of the foundation. This place has a Janissary commander. Next to its bath, there is a baker's shop. A dervish, bakes a kind of white bread loaf known as 'Sapanca Somunu'. Even if it sits for forty days, it is unlikely to dry out, get moldy, or lose its taste.

In 1837, during the period of Mahmud II, Adapazarı was made a district center. Sapanca was connected to it as a sub-district (nahiye). The Izmit-Bolu road passed through Sapanca. In his work Cihannümâ, Kâtip Çelebi notes that the part of the road in Sapanca passes through half a mile of water, and when the waters are high, they reach the stirrups. The same description was made by Charles Texier in the first half of the 19th century. One travels for about an hour on the sands of the lake. In some places, the water reaches up to the saddlebows. The railway that came to Sapanca in 1890 was passed by cutting through the narrow shore mentioned above. After the construction of the railway, the highway was neglected and became almost impassable. After the Russo-Turkish War of 1877-1878, a Laz population came to many neighborhoods of the district.

During the Republican era, the highway was routed not along the narrow shore of the lake but behind the slopes. Thus, the town continued its historical transportation function by both rail and road. In the 1950s, when the E5 Highway was routed along the opposite shore of the lake, Sapanca seemed to lose its importance for a while, but with the passage of the TEM Highway through the district in 1989, it regained its historical mission. Sapanca separated from the central district, to which it was connected as a bucak, and became a separate district in 1957.

== Geographical location ==
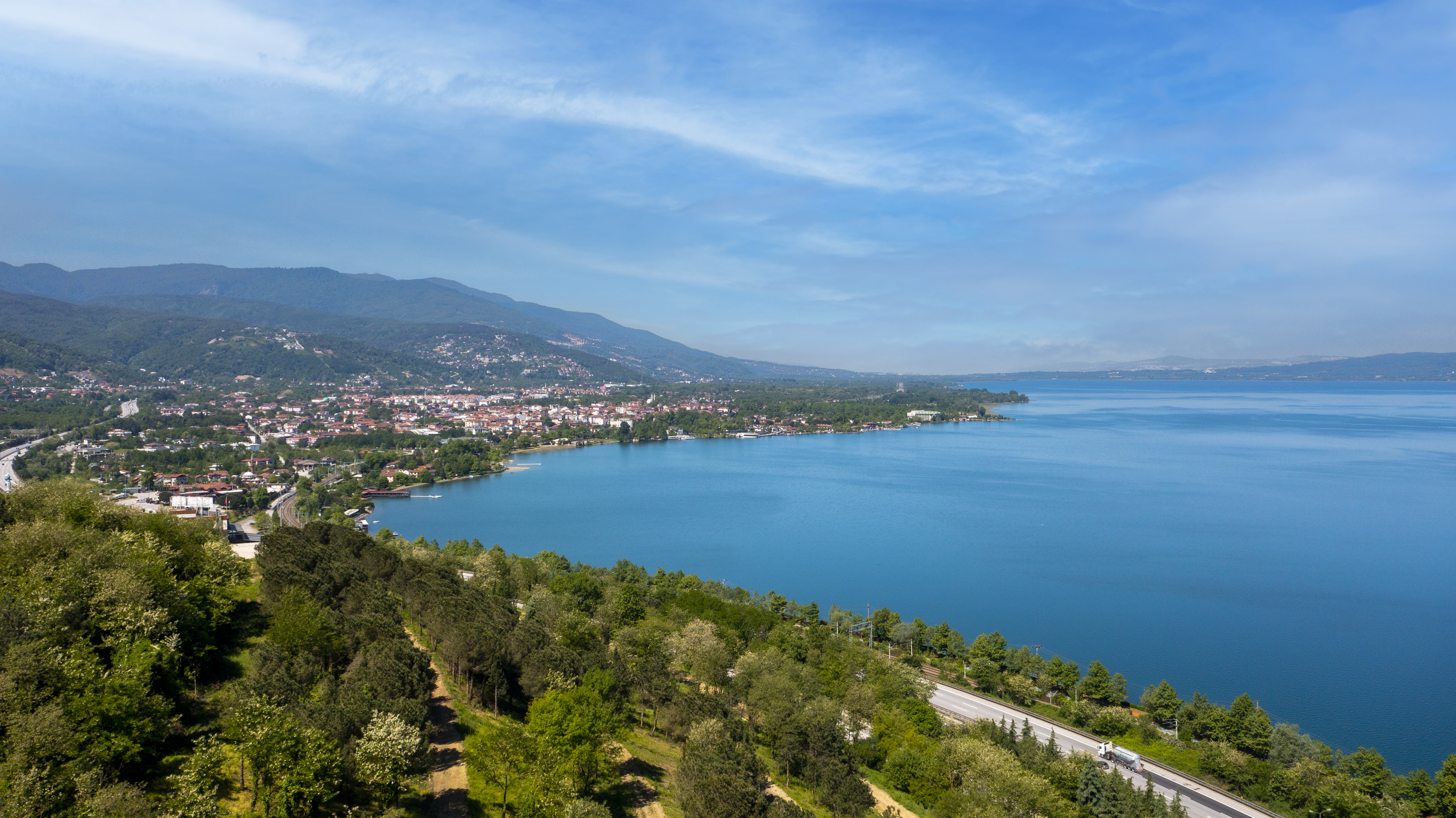
General View of Sapanca

Sapanca is a district of Sakarya Province. To the north lies Lake Sapanca, to the east Arifiye, to the south the Samanlı Mountains, and the districts of Geyve and Pamukova, and to the west lies the central district of Kocaeli, İzmit. Its area is 119 km² and its altitude is 36 m above sea level. It is the district of Sakarya with the smallest area and the highest population density.

=== Climate ===
The climate shows transitional characteristics between the Mediterranean climate and the Black Sea climate. Winters have abundant precipitation, usually in the form of rain. The season with the most precipitation is winter, and the least is summer. Summers are hot and dry, with high relative humidity. The hottest month is July with 22.8 °C, and the coldest month is January with 5.5 °C. The annual average temperature is 14.3 °C.

Additionally, the lowest temperature measured instantaneously is -11.2 °C (01.03.2000) and the highest temperature is 40.2 °C (08.18.2007).

== Topography ==
The district's lands are divided into two parts in terms of topography.

The first part comprises the northern slopes of the Samanlı Mountains, which are the extension of the Köroğlu Mountains stretching from the south of Bolu into the region, and the valleys formed on these slopes. This section is quite rugged. The second part is the piedmont plain where the Sapanca district center is also located, at the northern foothills of the Samanlı Mountains. This plain was formed by alluvium carried by streams descending from the northern slopes of the mountains.

The most important of these streams descending from the mountains are İstanbul Stream, Kurtköy Stream, and Mahmudiye Stream. Also, Akçay Stream, the most important stream in the district, joins the Sakarya River. The North Anatolian Fault passes through Lake Sapanca. For this reason, the district is a first-degree earthquake zone. However, the fact that the fault line passes through the lake has ensured that the district center and other residential areas are less affected by earthquakes. The district survived the August 17, 1999 earthquake with little damage for this reason.

== Tourism ==
Recently, the district has been preferred for short-term holidays due to its proximity to Istanbul and other nearby cities, and because it is a town with a lake and greenery. Tourism income is increasing every day, especially with the tourist facilities established around the lake. Tourism in the district, which declined after the 1999 earthquake when the facilities by the lake became unusable, has begun to revive in recent years. Especially in settlements around the district such as Maşukiye and Kırkpınar, many holiday villages and summer houses have been established.

Another area that has developed in recent years is Kartepe, the highest of the Samanlı Mountains near Maşukiye. With the new facilities established here, winter tourism has also begun to develop.

The 5-star Richmond Hotel, opened to tourism in 2006, hosted the ministers of the time during the preparation of the 2007 constitutional draft. On April 12, 2008, the 5-star NG Sapanca Hotel with a spa wellness concept opened in the Kırkpınar neighborhood of Sapanca.

Due to the district's proximity to Istanbul and demand from many companies, it has seen demand in banquet (meeting) tourism, and in 2019, the 5-star Elite World Grand Sapanca opened in Göl Mahallesi, and in 2020, the 5-star NG Enjoy also began service in the Kırkpınar neighborhood.

Following the COVID-19 pandemic experienced worldwide, the change in tourism understanding in the country, which emphasized isolated vacations, brought villa and bungalow tourism to the fore in the district; therefore, according to 2022 data, over 2,000 bungalows have been built.

== Historical places ==
=== Byzantine era sarcophagi and tombstones ===
Sarcophagi from the Byzantine period are exhibited in front of the Sapanca Government Mansion. Two of the sarcophagi were found in 1976 near İlmiye village, and the other two were found in 1987 during the construction works of the TEM Highway. Also, in the Kurtköy village interior area, there are remains of a castle built by the last king of the Bithynians for hiding.

=== Vecihi Gate ===
Although there is no definitive information, it is rumored that the Silk Road passed through the location of the Arch, which is said to have been built by Mimar Sinan. Since the Arch has been repaired several times, only its main body is of historical monument character today. The first repair of the Arch was carried out in 1905 by Yanyalı Vecihi Orhon, who served as the Sub-district Director in Sapanca, while preserving its original structure.

=== Rahime Sultan Mosque and Rahime Sultan Tughra ===
It was built in 1892 by Rahime Sultan, the fourth wife of Sultan Abdülmecit. It was repaired in 1967. The mosque, which largely preserves its original structure, had its minaret damaged after the August 17 earthquake.

=== Rüstempaşa Mosque ===
It was built in 1555 by the apprentices of Mimar Sinan, on the orders of Rüstem Pasha, the son-in-law and vizier of Suleiman the Magnificent. The mosque, located in the district center, is still open for worship, although it has undergone some renovations over time.

=== Hasan Fehmi Paşa Mosque ===
It was built in 1885 by the Ottoman Vizier Hasan Fehmi Paşa. Located in Mahmudiye village, 3 km from Sapanca, the interior of the mosque is decorated with very beautiful embellishments.

=== Camii Cedid (New Mosque) ===
The mosque located in the bazaar was built in 1899. As understood from its name, this mosque is located in the Camii Cedid Neighborhood. The mosque has been renovated with a restoration in recent years.
