= Kocaali =

- District and municipality
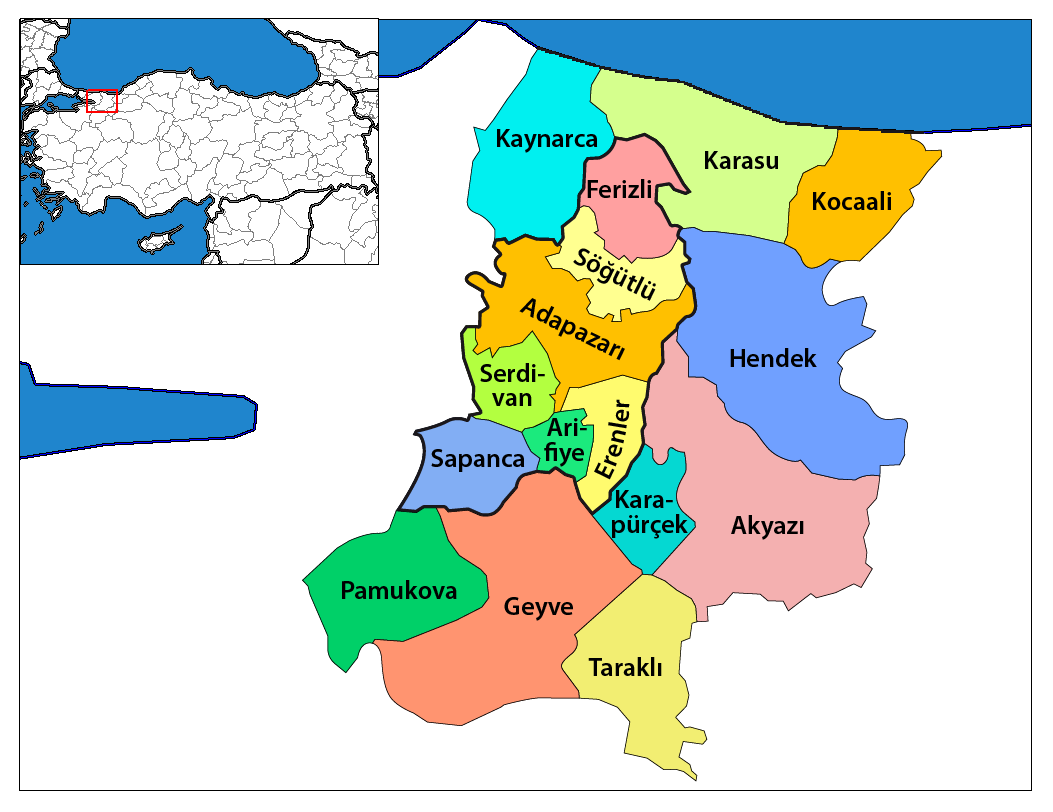
- Map showing Kocaali District in Sakarya Province

- Location within Turkey Location within Marmara
- Coordinates: 41°03′17″N 30°51′01″E
- Country: Turkey
- Province: Sakarya

Government
  - Mayor: Ahmet Acar (AKP)
- Area: 254 km^{2} (98 sq mi)
- Population (2022): 22,882
  - Density: 90.1/km^{2} (233/sq mi)
- Time zone: UTC+3 (TRT)
- Postal code: 54800
- Area code: 0264
- Climate: Cfb
- Website: www.kocaali.bel.tr

Kocaali is a municipality and district of Sakarya Province, Turkey. Its area is 254 km^{2}, and its population 22,882 (2022). The mayor is Ahmet Acar (AKP).

The main sources of income are hazelnuts, livestock and tourism. The town is near the Black Sea coast, and has a 14 km long and 500 meters wide, sandy beach. There are Ottoman-era mines near the river Maden Deresi, a monastery in Şerbetpınar. The Melen river flows into the sea in the east of the district. One of the leading rafting areas in the Marmara region of Turkey, Kocaali is also very suitable for fishing. As a result of the Great Melen Project, water from the river Melen is directed to Istanbul to serve as drinking water. State road D.010 connects Kocaali with Karasu to the west and Akçakoca to the east.

== Composition ==
There are 36 neighbourhoods in Kocaali District:

- Açmabaşı
- Ağalar
- Akpınar
- Aktaş
- Alandere
- Aydoğan
- Beyler
- Bezirgan
- Caferiye
- Çakmaklı
- Çukurköy
- Demiraçma
- Görele
- Gümüşoluk
- Hızar
- Kadıköy
- Karalar
- Karapelit
- Karşı
- Kestanepınarı
- Kirazlı
- Kızılüzüm
- Koğutpelit
- Köyyeri
- Kozluk
- Küplük
- Melen
- Merkez
- Selahiye
- Şerbetpınar
- Süngüt
- Yalı
- Yalpankaya
- Yanıksayvant
- Yayla
- Yeni
