= Erenler, Sakarya =

Erenler
- District and municipality
- Logo

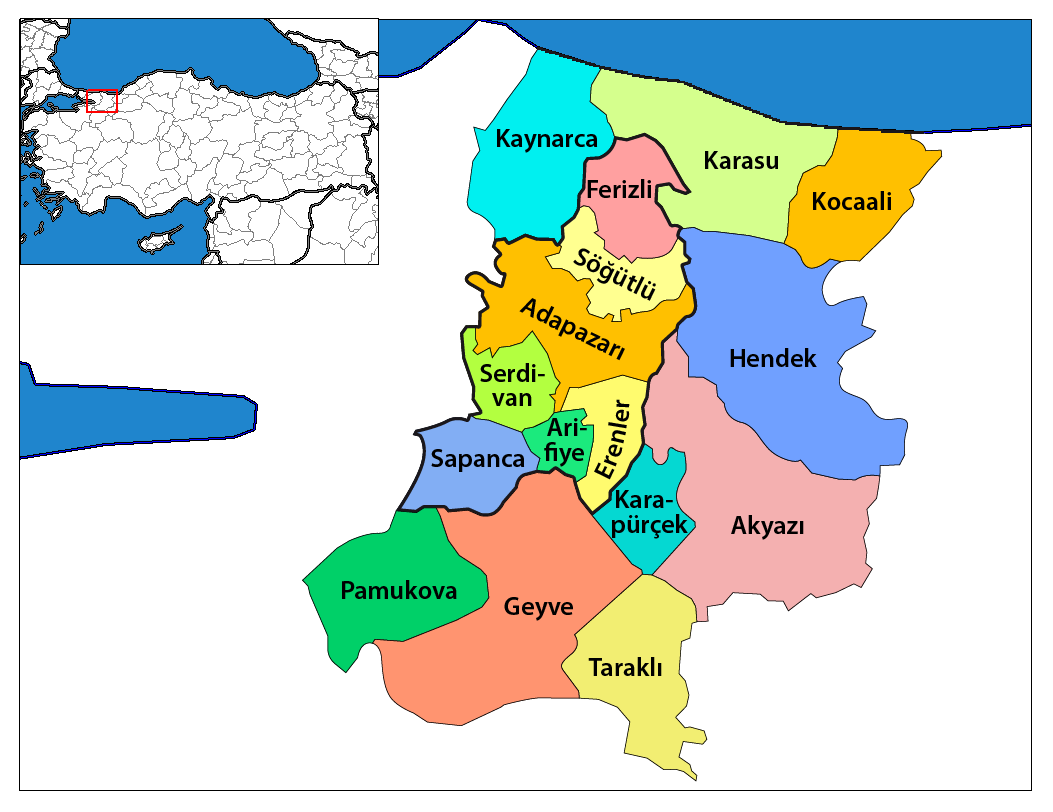
- Map showing Erenler District in Sakarya Province

- Location in Turkey Erenler (Marmara)
- Coordinates: 40°45′N 30°25′E
- Country: Turkey
- Province: Sakarya

Government
  - Mayor: Şenol Dinç (BBP)
- Area: 136 km^{2} (53 sq mi)
- Elevation: 32 m (105 ft)
- Population (2022): 92,249
  - Density: 678/km^{2} (1,760/sq mi)
- Time zone: UTC+3 (TRT)
- Postal code: 54200
- Area code: 0264
- Website: www.erenler.bel.tr

Erenler is a municipality and district of Sakarya Province, Turkey. Its area is 136 km^{2}, and its population is 92,249 (2022). It covers the southeastern part of the agglomeration of Adapazarı and the adjacent countryside.

== Geography ==
Erenler is a part of Adapazarı city. It is situated slightly to the east of the urban fabric. Sakarya River flows within the municipality. The average elevation of the settlement is about 32 m (105 ft) above mean sea level.

== History ==
During the Ottoman Empire era, Erenler was a village. Between 14 March 1921 and 21 June 1921 the village saw occupation by the Greek army. During the Republican era, the population of the village increased and consequently it became a seat of township in 1963. In 1999, Erenler suffered from the İzmit earthquake. Soon after the disaster, the town continued its growth, and it merged to the province capital. In 2008, the district Erenler was created from part of the former central district of Adapazarı/Sakarya Province, along with the districts Adapazarı, Arifiye and Serdivan.

== Population ==
Historical population
Year	Pop.	±% p.a.
2008	72,621	—
2012	76,090	+1.17%
2017	85,649	+2.40%
2022	92,249	+1.50%
Source: TÜIK (2008-2022)

== Composition ==
There are 33 neighbourhoods in Erenler District:

- Alancuma
- Bağlar
- Bekirpaşa
- Büyükesence
- Çaybaşıyeniköy
- Çaykışla
- Değirmendere
- Dilmen
- Ekinli
- Emirler
- Epçeller
- Erenler
- Hacıoğlu
- Hasanbey
- Horozlar
- Hürriyet
- Kamışlı
- Kayalarmemduhiye
- Kayalarreşitbey
- Kozluk
- Küçükesence
- Küpçüler
- Nakışlar
- Pirahmatler
- Sarıcalar
- Şeyhköy
- Şükriye
- Tabakhane
- Tepe
- Tuapsalar
- Yazılı
- Yenimahalle
- Yeşiltepe
