= Lake Sapanca =

Lake in Turkey

- Sapanca Gölü (Turkish)
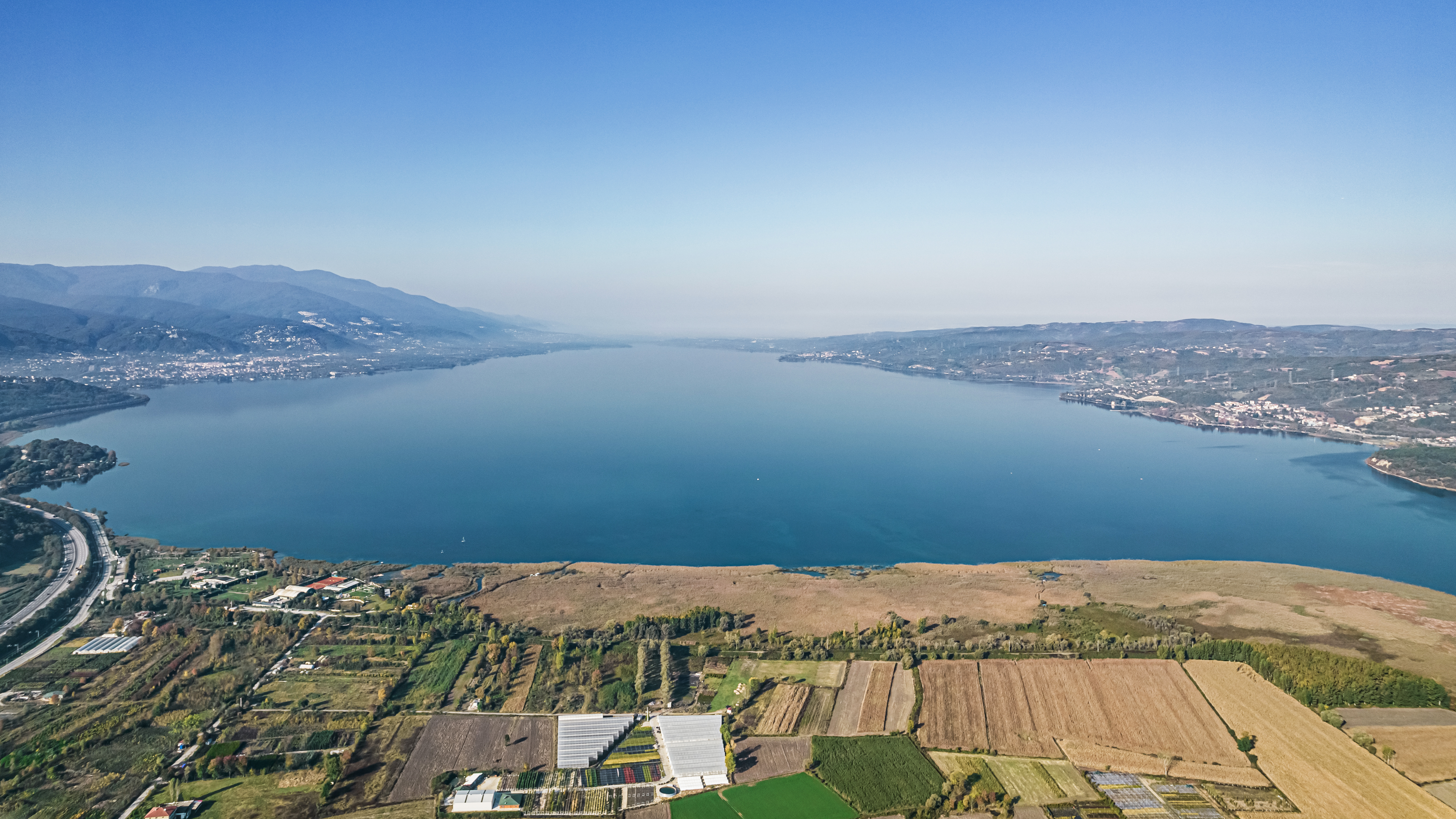

- Location within Turkey
- Location: Sapanca
- Coordinates: 40°43′N 30°15′E
- Catchment area: 251 km^{2} (97 sq mi)
- Basin countries: Turkey
- Surface area: 45 km^{2} (17 sq mi)
- Max. depth: 52 m (171 ft)

Lake Sapanca (Turkish: Sapanca Gölü) (previous Greek name: Boáne (Βοάνη)) is a fresh water lake in Turkey, between the Gulf of İzmit and the Adapazarı Meadow and next to the village of Sapanca. The lake has a catchment area of 251 square kilometres (97 sq mi), a surface area of 45 square kilometres (17 sq mi), a length 16 kilometres (9.9 mi) east–west, a width of 5 kilometres (3.1 mi) north–south, and a maximum depth of 52 metres (171 ft).

Sapanca Lake is located on a tectonic hole, which is situated between Izmit Bay and Adapazarı Meadow and runs parallel to Lake İznik.

The catchment area of Lake Sapanca - about 251 km^{2} [km²] - is surrounded by mountains in the south and small hills in the north. Water is taken from the lake for domestic and industrial needs.

The region around Sapanca is an important destination for day trips and weekend vacations.

== Physical characteristics ==
=== Length ===
Located between the Sakarya River to its east and the Gulf of İzmit to its west, at an elevation of 33 m above sea level, the lake is 16 km long in the east-west direction and 5 km wide in the north-south direction.

=== Surface Area ===
The long-term average surface area of the lake is 46.9 km², and its catchment area has been calculated as 296 km².

=== Depth ===
The maximum depth of the lake is 61 m. A plain with a depth of 40–50 m is found in the center of the lake. The 50 m and 60 m isobaths cover a narrow area. The lake floor rises in the northeast and west. The lake floor is surrounded by fault-controlled steep basin walls from the north, south, and southeast.

=== Volume ===
The volume of Lake Sapanca is 1.7 km³. The average depth is 36 m. The deepest part of the basin is 28 m below sea level. Earthquakes have also been found to affect the lake level changes. The largest level change was calculated after the 1967 Mudurnu earthquake.

The excess water of the lake forms the Çark Stream via the outflow at its eastern end. Çark Stream merges with the Sakarya River near the village of Seyifler in Ferizli. The waters of Sapanca are released into Çark Stream controlled by a sluice gate, and the water level is planned to be maintained between 29.90 m and 31.50 m.

=== Streams feeding the lake ===
Lake Sapanca is fed by small streams descending from the mountains and springs at its bottom. The streams on the southern shore of Lake Sapanca, from east to west, are: Arifiye, Keçi (Kuruçeşme), İstanbul, Mahmudiye, Kurtköy, Yanık, Kuruçay; and the streams on the northern part are: Cehennem, Aygır, Altıkuruş, Çakalöldü Maden, Kuru, Liman, Eşme, Fındık, Tuzla, Çiftepınar, Balıkhane streams. Because high-discharge streams carry coarse-grained sediments, sediment traps (tersip bends) have been built by the State Hydraulic Works (DSİ) on these streams to prevent the filling of the lake bed. In addition to these streams, existing springs within the lake also continuously feed the lake.

Observation stations opened by the State Hydraulic Works (DSİ) and the Electrical Power Resources Survey and Development Administration (EİEİ) in the region allow monitoring of the lake's water level changes and flow. According to measurements made by EİEİ, the lake's water level rises in winter and spring months and falls towards autumn. A difference of 70–90 cm, sometimes 120–130 cm, is observed between the two levels.

The E-5 Highway passes along the northern shore of the lake, while the TEM Highway and railway pass along the southern shore.

== Natural life ==
Observations made around the lake throughout the year have identified 69 bird species from 28 families and 12 orders. Of these species, 29 are resident species seen in all seasons, 23 are summer migrants seen in summer, 12 are winter migrants, and 5 are passage migrants encountered once. The highest number of species, 42, was counted in April, and the lowest, 26, in March. The Ferruginous duck observed in the area has the NT (Near Threatened) conservation status, and the White-headed duck has the EN (Endangered) status. The remaining species belong to the Least Concern (LC) group. When the species found in the lake are examined, it is accepted that the area is an important aquatic ecosystem. The highest number of species was observed in summer, and the highest number of individuals was observed in winter.

Its location on the migration route, and the fact that many species and individuals shelter and breed here, necessitates its inclusion in the list of Wetlands of International Importance.

== Problems ==
The lake, which supplies 90% of Sakarya city's drinking water, Kocaeli's drinking water, and industrial water for Tüpraş, is affected by various pollutants. Pollution from the D-100 passing to its north and the TEM highway and railway surrounding its south is carried into the lake by rainwater. A study conducted in 1997 determined that heavy metals, solid matter, and grease-oil are carried into the lake from the highways during rainy weather. The establishment of Stormwater Wetlands, a natural treatment method, is recommended for treating pollution from the roads. Agricultural chemicals in the basin, tourist facilities, and a petroleum pipeline belonging to NATO are other potential polluting factors.

Domestic wastewater from settlements around the lake and the increasing number of summer houses in recent years is treated. The uncertainty regarding the institutions using water from the lake and the amount of water they take makes planning difficult.

== Archaeology ==
In 2025, a historic structure with mosaic floors reemerged in the lake as water levels dropped. Historians believe the structure is a small Late Antique chapel or church, based on its mosaic style and decorative features. It may also have been connected to nearby Byzantine-era sites, such as the castle in Kurtkoy.

== Gallery ==
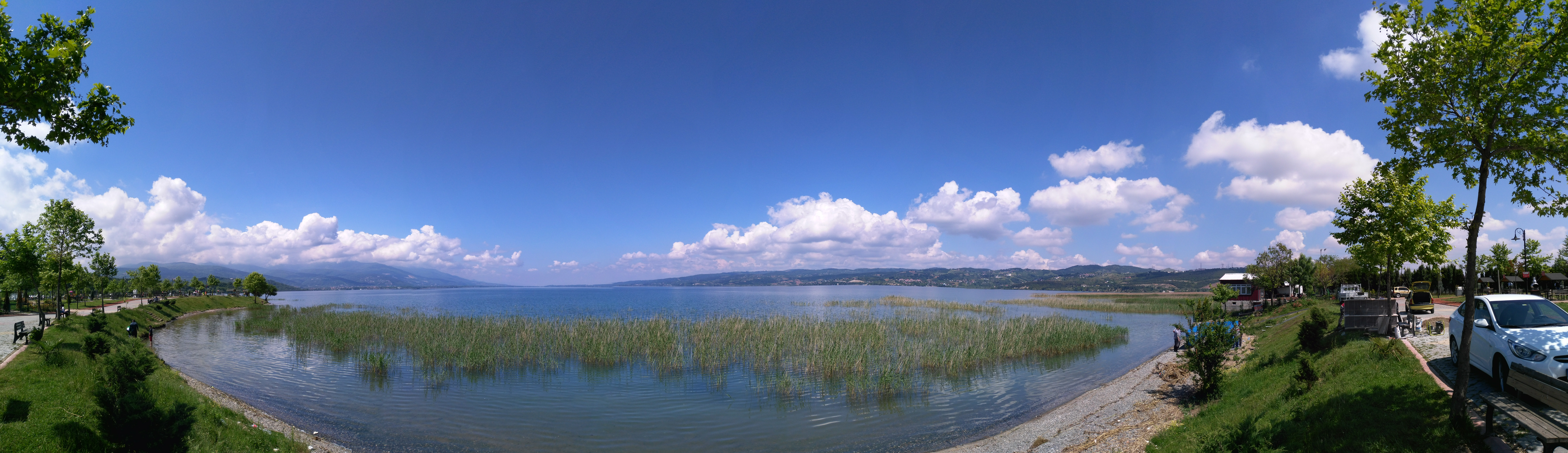
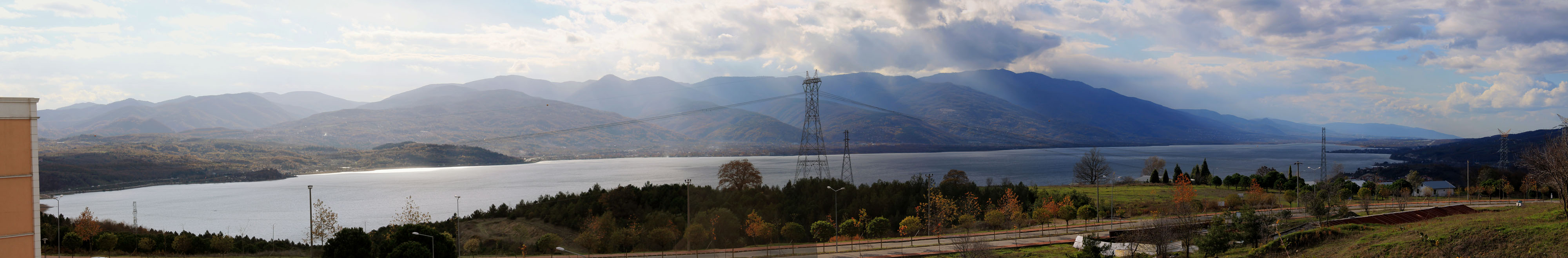
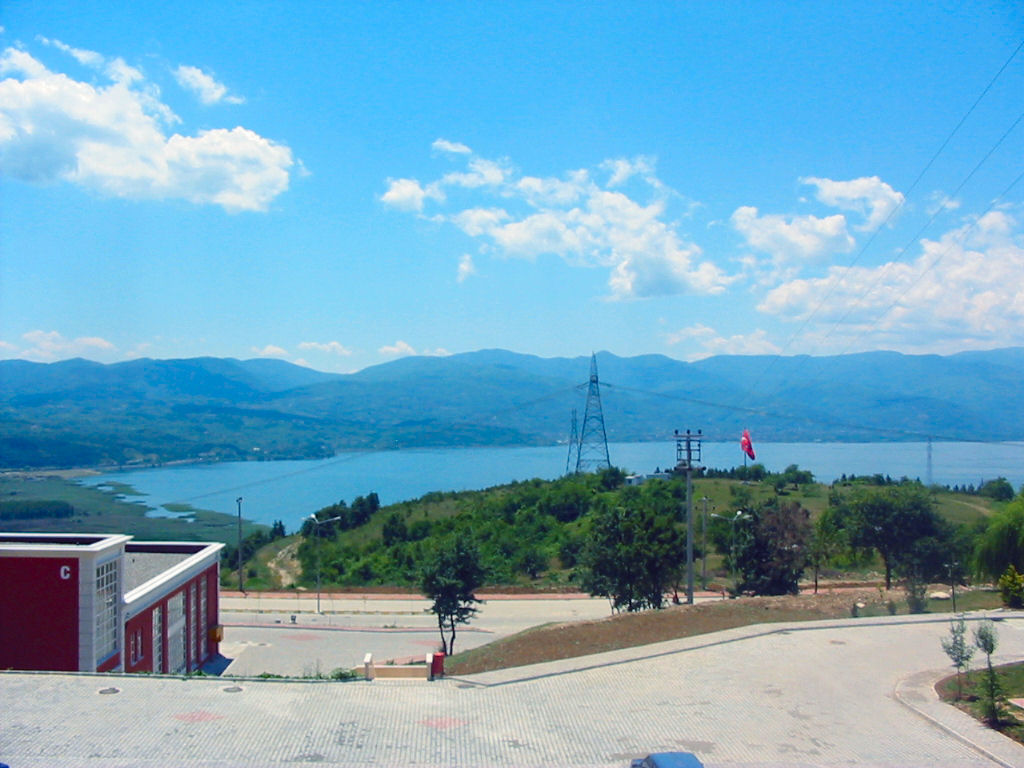
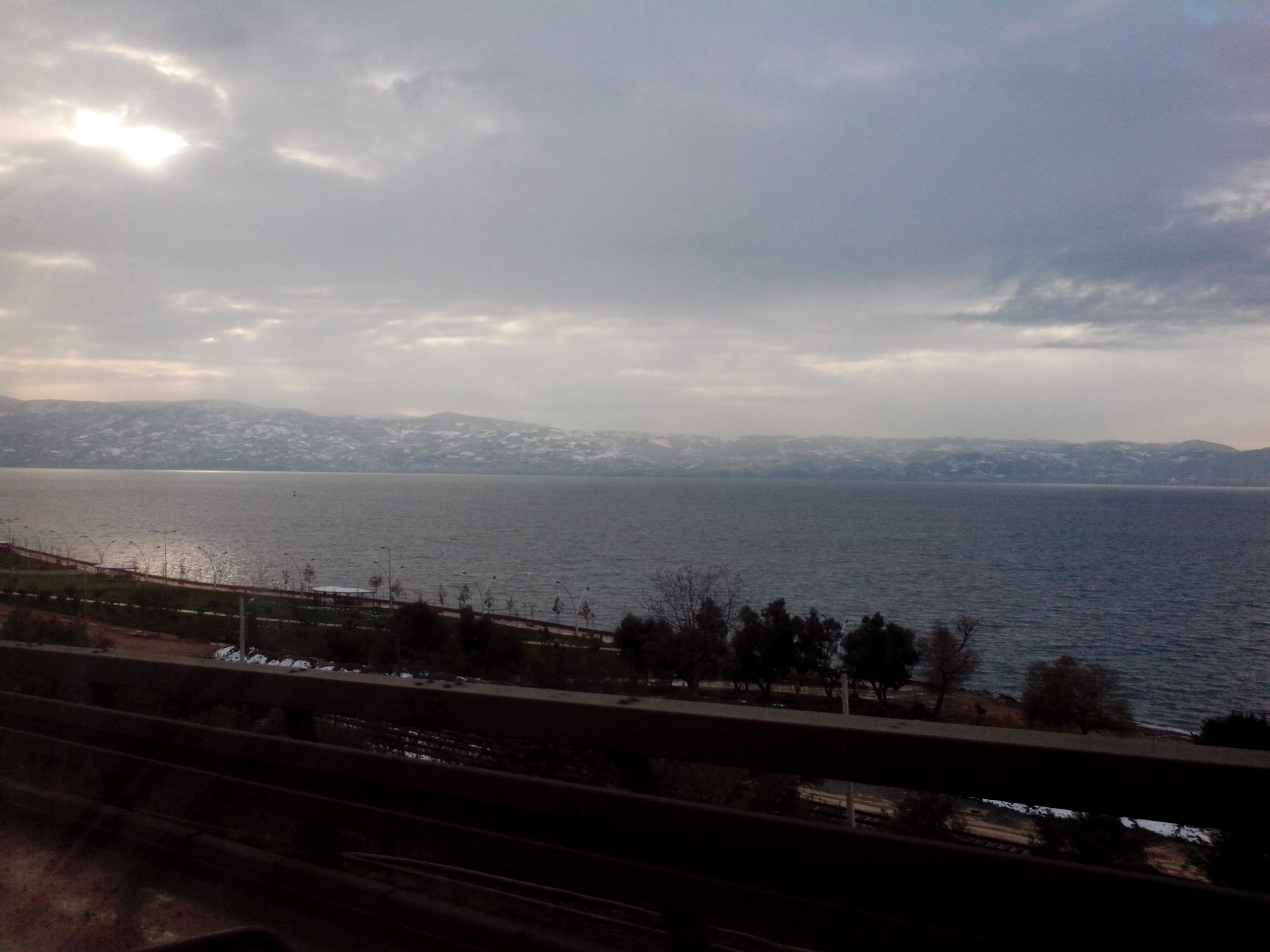
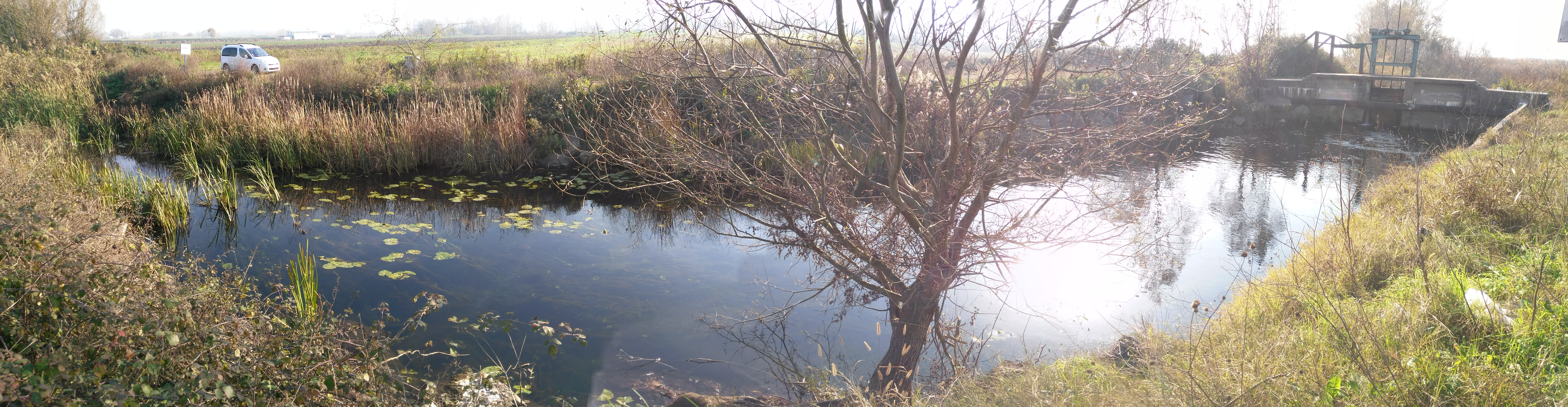

== List of fish in the Lake Sapanca ==
Anguillidae

- European eel, Anguilla anguilla (Liiaeus, 1758)

Atherinidae

- Big-scale sand smelt, Atherina boyeri (Risso, 1810)

Clupeidae

- Black Sea shad, Alosa maeotica (Grimm, 1901)
- Clupeonella abrau muhlisi (Neu, 1934)

Cobitidae

- Cobitis vardarensis (Karaman, 1928)
- Angora loach, Nemacheilus angorae (Steindachner, 1897)

Cyprinidae

- Common bream, Abramis brama (Linnaeus, 1758)
- Italian bleak, Alburnus albidus (Costa, 1938)
- Common bleak, Alburnus alburnus (Linnaeus, 1758)
- Danube bleak, Alburnus chalcoides (Guldenstad, 1772)
- Spirlin, Alburnoides bipunctatus (Bloch, 1782)
- Silver bream, Blicca bjoerkna (Linnaeus, 1758)
- Crucian carp, Carassius carassius (Linnaeus, 1758)
- Prussian carp, Carassius gibelio (Bloch, 1782)
- Black Sea nase Chondrostoma angorense (Elvira, 1987)
- Common carp, Cyprinus carpio (Linnaeus, 1758)
- Asp, Leuciscus aspius (Linnaeus, 1758)
- Black Sea chub, Petroleuciscus borysthenicus (Kessler, 1859)
- European bitterling, Rhodeus amarus (Bloch, 1782)
- Common roach, Rutilus rutilus (Linnaeus, 1758)
- Common rudd, Scardinius erythrophthalmus (Linnaeus, 1758)
- European chub, Squalius cephalus (Linnaeus, 1758)
- Tench, Tinca tinca (Linnaeus, 1758)
- Vimba bream, Vimba vimba (Linnaeus, 1758)

Esocidae

- Northern pike, Esox lucius (Linnaeus, 1758)

Gobiidae

- Caucasian dwarf goby, Knipowitschia caucasica (Berg, 1916)
- Racer goby, Babka gymnotrachelus (Kessler, 1857)
- Round goby, Neogobius melanostomus (Pallas, 1814)
- Monkey goby, Neogobius fluviatilis (Pallas, 1814)
- Syrman goby, Ponticola syrman (Nordmann, 1840)
- Marine tubenose goby, Proterorhinus marmoratus (Pallas, 1814)

Centrarchidae

- Pumpkinseed, Lepomis gibbosus (Linnaeus, 1758)

Percidae

- European perch, Perca fluviatilis (Linnaeus, 1758)

Petromyzontidae

- European river lamprey, Lampetra fluviatilis (Linnaeus, 1758)

Salmonidae

- Rainbow trout, Oncorhynchus mykiss (Walbaum, 1792)
- Black Sea salmon, Salmo trutta labrax (Pallas, 1811)
- Salmo cettii, Salmo trutta macrostigma (Dumeril, 1858)

Siluridae

- Wels catfish, Silurus glanis (Linnaeus, 1758)

Syngnathidae

- Black-striped pipefish, Syngnathus abaster (Risso, 1827)
- Narrow-snouted pipefish, Syngnathus tenuirostris (Rathke, 1837)

https://web.archive.org/web/20101105212503/http://www.fisheriessciences.com/tur/Journal/vol1/issue3/jfscom2007018.pdf

== See also ==
- Lakes of Turkey
