= Geyve =

- District and municipality
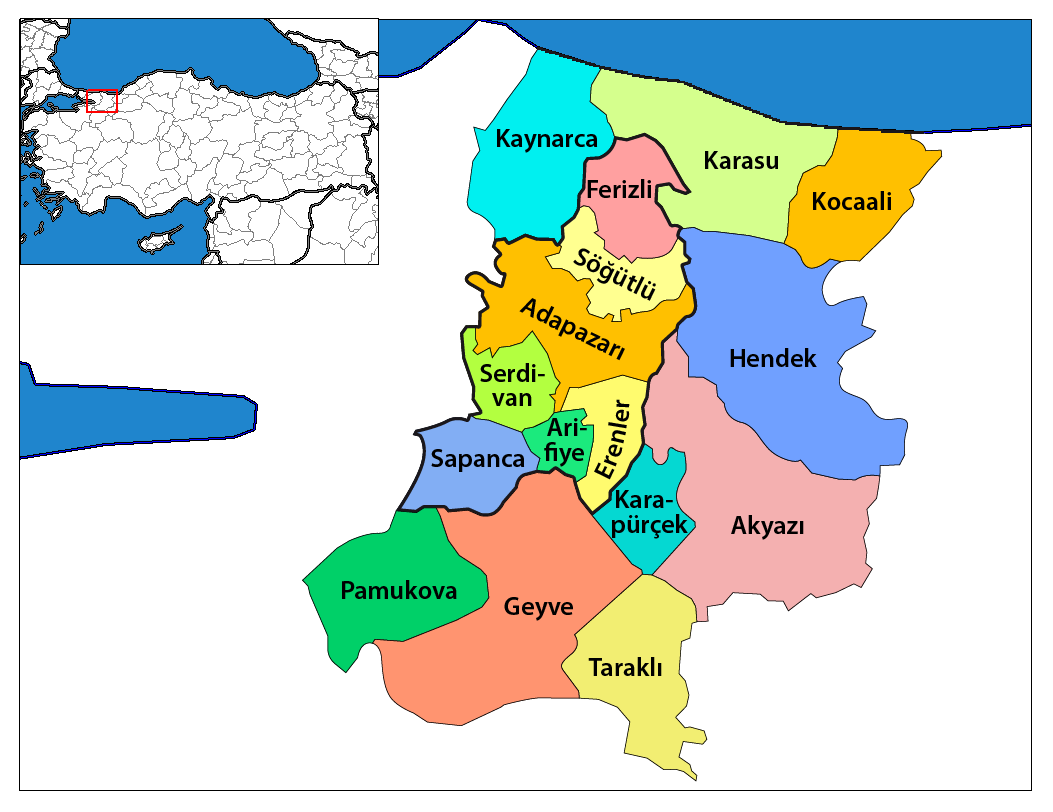
- Map showing Geyve District in Sakarya Province

- Location within Turkey Location within Marmara
- Coordinates: 40°30′32″N 30°17′24″E
- Country: Turkey
- Province: Sakarya

Government
  - Mayor: Selçuk Yildiz (YRP)
- Area: 662 km^{2} (256 sq mi)
- Population (2022): 50,799
  - Density: 76.7/km^{2} (199/sq mi)
- Time zone: UTC+3 (TRT)
- Postal code: 54700
- Area code: 0264
- Climate: Csa
- Website: www.geyve.bel.tr

Geyve is a municipality and district of Sakarya Province, Turkey. Its area is 662 km^{2}, and its population is 50,799 as of 2022. The closest international airport is Istanbul Sabiha Gökçen International Airport, 139 km (86 mi) from Geyve. It is the largest district of Sakarya Province in terms of area. Geyve is located at the foot of Geyve Gorge, which is set between two mountain ranges and lies along the Sakarya River. Geyve region has an impressive green landscape and productive nature. Geyve is relatively close to many important cities in Turkey; 179 km (111 mi) to Istanbul, 30 km to Adapazarı, 75 km (47 mi) to Izmit, 139 km to Bursa, 156 km (97 mi) to Eskişehir, 167 km (104 mi) to Bolu by road.

== Geography ==
The highest point of Geyve is Cine Tasi Hill at 1,040 m (3,410 ft) and the town center elevation is 124 m (407 ft). The third longest river in Turkey, Sakarya River runs through Geyve and it is perceived as an important inspiration of the town.

Geyve lies on the North Anatolian Fault System. According to historical records, many devastating earthquakes have occurred in the last two millennia along the surrounding area.

In recent history, on 22 July 1967, a strong, 7.2 Richter magnitude scale earthquake hit Geyve and had given considerable damage to the town. On 17 August 1999, Geyve, despite the proximity to epicenter of earthquake, was not destroyed as the neighboring Adapazarı and Gölcük. Unfortunately, Turkish earthquake scientists had made several worrying reports that the next expected Marmara earthquake could impact Geyve and Akyazı region as there had been an additional fault under Geyve, which had not broken in the last 300 years.

Sakarya River is passing through Geyve, and is one of the important water sources for the land/agriculture. Geyve Karaçay Creek is also passing through the town center. On June 6, 2014, Geyve has experienced a significant flooding caused by Karaçay Creek after heavy rain, resulting in tremendous destruction and one fatality.

=== Climate ===
Geyve has a hot-summer Mediterranean climate (Köppen: Csa), with hot, dry summers, and cool, damp winters.

Climate data for Geyve (1991–2020)
Month	Jan	Feb	Mar	Apr	May	Jun	Jul	Aug	Sep	Oct	Nov	Dec	Year
Mean daily maximum °C (°F)	8.9 (48.0)	11.1 (52.0)	14.6 (58.3)	19.7 (67.5)	24.3 (75.7)	28.3 (82.9)	30.4 (86.7)	30.9 (87.6)	27.4 (81.3)	22.0 (71.6)	15.9 (60.6)	10.5 (50.9)	20.4 (68.7)
Daily mean °C (°F)	4.1 (39.4)	5.4 (41.7)	8.2 (46.8)	12.5 (54.5)	17.4 (63.3)	21.5 (70.7)	23.9 (75.0)	24.2 (75.6)	20.1 (68.2)	15.3 (59.5)	9.5 (49.1)	5.6 (42.1)	14.0 (57.2)
Mean daily minimum °C (°F)	0.7 (33.3)	1.4 (34.5)	3.5 (38.3)	6.9 (44.4)	11.3 (52.3)	15.1 (59.2)	17.5 (63.5)	18.0 (64.4)	14.0 (57.2)	10.1 (50.2)	4.9 (40.8)	2.2 (36.0)	8.8 (47.8)
Average precipitation mm (inches)	77.07 (3.03)	60.92 (2.40)	63.2 (2.49)	50.6 (1.99)	44.88 (1.77)	51.78 (2.04)	25.17 (0.99)	16.54 (0.65)	31.57 (1.24)	59.67 (2.35)	53.08 (2.09)	86.57 (3.41)	621.05 (24.45)
Average precipitation days (≥ 1.0 mm)	10.3	9.6	8.7	7.3	6.3	5.6	3.4	3.3	4.5	7.2	7.6	11.0	84.8
Average relative humidity (%)	80.9	77.9	74.1	71.0	71.0	68.9	67.6	68.2	70.2	76.9	80.2	81.9	74.0
Source: NOAA

== Economy ==
Geyve's economy is centered in agriculture as it has a productive agricultural land. It has a mild transitional climate, carrying mixed characteristics of Mediterranean, Black Sea and Inland Anatolian climates. Geyve's climate, the Sakarya River, and its productive land allow the varieties of fruits, vegetables and grains to be produced in Geyve. Sakarya River is the main vessel of town's agriculture. Especially, the quince, cherry, apple, peach and grape of Geyve are quite well known in local and Istanbul markets.

Since the end of the 1990s, Geyve has been a popular trekking destination, presenting different routes especially with its proximity to Istanbul.

Alifuatpaşa Train Station was serving Geyve for over 100 years until February 2012 when Ankara-Istanbul railway was closed for Ankara-Istanbul high-speed railway construction. Ankara-Istanbul high-speed railway, which is expected to be finished by 2014, will run through Geyve. Even though it is not certain, the high-speed train is expected to stop at the neighboring towns, Pamukova and Arifiye.

== History ==
There is not enough scientific evidence available regarding the first settlers of Geyve. The ruins around the region do not survive, but it is almost certain that Geyve is an historical settlement dating back thousands of years. There are different claims that its origin goes to 4000 BC, and even some sources to 10000 BC. Geyve region has been inhabited by Phrygians, Hittites, Lydians, Romans, Armenians, Byzantines, Turks and many other civilizations since prehistoric times. Many historical evidence from Byzantine and Roman Empire era have been discovered in Geyve. Geyve was known to be one of the early Ottoman conquests. It was conquered by Osman Gazi (reigned c. 1299–1323/4), first Ottoman Sultan, in the 14th century from the Byzantine Empire.

The demography of the town has been significantly impacted by the population exchange between Greece and Turkey in 1923. According to the Ottoman General Census of 1881/82-1893, the kaza of Geyve had a total population of 32,607, consisting of 22,133 Muslims, 5,873 Armenians, 4,520 Greeks, 79 Protestants, 1 Jew and 1 foreign citizen. Several old photographs and evidence have been collected by a local researcher-collector in the following link.

The origin of Geyve's name is controversial. Evliya Çelebi, famous Ottoman traveller, in his Seyahatnâme states that Geyve's name comes from the Byzantine princess named Geyve.

Geyve has also been important as it was on the historical Silk Road or Silk Route. Geyve–Tarakli road can still be accessed, even though the road lost its importance.

Geyve was one of the symbolic towns in the Turkish War of Independence (1919–1923). Geyve Gorge had a strategic importance during the War of Independence. Alifuatpaşa, Geyve is one of the first resistance fronts of the war, commanded and led by Ali Fuat Cebesoy against British Army heading to Anatolia. The founder of the Turkish Republic, Mustafa Kemal Atatürk, visited Geyve two times in 1920 and 1922 during the War of Independence.

== Landmarks ==
The most significant landmark of the town, the old bridge over Sakarya River in Alifuatpasa, was constructed in the era of Sultan Bayezid II of Ottoman Empire (reigned 1481–1512). The bridge was kept well by Ottoman Sultans as the bridge is strategically located on the Silk Road. One of the oldest photographs of the bridge (from around 1888) by a Swedish photographer, Guillaume Berggren, is depicted in the National Gallery of Canada.

Another significant landmark is Elvanbey Imarethanesi (public kitchen), which was constructed in 1451 by Elvanbey. It was told to be serving to the traveling dervishes of Anatolia. The building was used as Geyve Public Library between 1969 and 2013. In 2013, the building was converted to a museum.

The neighboring town of Taraklı presents the examples of Ottoman houses that presents examples of Ottoman style wooden houses. The well known Lake Sapanca is 32 km from Geyve.

The Doğançay Waterfall is a natural monument located in Maksudiye village of Geyve.

== Composition ==
There are 73 neighbourhoods in Geyve District:

- Ahibaba
- Akdoğan
- Akıncı
- Akkaya
- Alifuatpaşa
- Alıplar
- Aydınlar
- Bağcaz
- Bağlarbaşı
- Bayat
- Belpınar
- Bozören
- Burhaniye
- Camikebir
- Çamlık
- Çayköy
- Ceceler
- Çeltikler
- Çengel
- Çine
- Çukurköy
- Demirler
- Dereköy
- Doğançay
- Doğancıl
- Doğantepe
- Düzakçaşehir
- Epçeler
- Esenköy
- Eşme
- Fındıksuyu
- Gazisüleyman Paşa
- Güney
- Günhoşlar
- Hacılar
- Hacıosmanlar
- Halidiye
- Hırka
- Hisarlık
- Ihsaniye
- Ilıcaköy
- İlimbey
- İnciksuyu
- Kamışlı
- Karaçam
- Karacaören
- Kızılkaya
- Köprübaşı
- Koru
- Kozan
- Kulfallar
- Maksudiye
- Melekşeoruç
- Melekşesolak
- Nuruosmaniye
- Örencik
- Orhaniye
- Poydular
- Sabırlar
- Safibey
- Saraçlı
- Sarıgazi
- Şehren
- Sekiharman
- Şerefiye
- Setçe
- Suçatı
- Sütalan
- Taşoluk
- Tepecikler
- Umurbey
- Yaylak
- Yörükler

== Notable people ==
One of the most prominent generals of Turkish War of Independence, Ali Fuat Cebesoy was buried in Alifuatpaşa, Geyve, when he died at the age of 86 in 1968. In accordance with his will, he was buried to the backyard of a mosque near Geyve train station, where the first shots of the Turkish War of Independence were fired.

The former coach of Fenerbahce S.K., Aykut Kocaman and the former Fenerbahce S.K. president Tahsin Kaya was born in Geyve.

Roses of Geyve (Geyve'nin Gülleri) was cited in the famous poem of Sezai Karakoç's Mona Roza.
