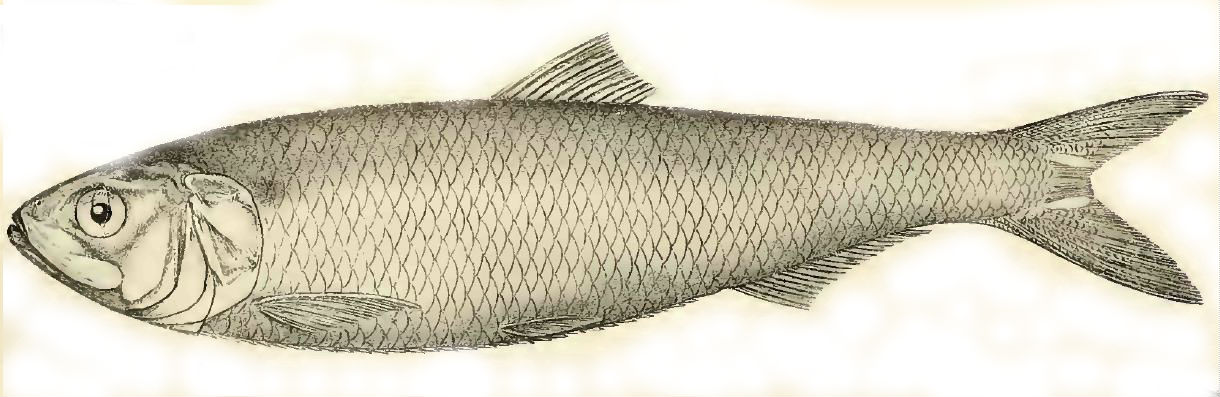

Conservation status
- Least Concern (IUCN 3.1)

Scientific classification
- Domain: Eukaryota
- Kingdom: Animalia
- Phylum: Chordata
- Class: Actinopterygii
- Order: Clupeiformes
- Family: Alosidae
- Genus: Alosa
- Species: A. tanaica

Binomial name
- Alosa tanaica (Grimm, 1901)

Synonyms
- Clupea tanaica Grimm, 1901; Alosa caspia tanaica (Grimm, 1901); Alosa nordmanni Antipa, 1904; Alosa bulgarica Drensky, 1934; Caspialosa palaeostomica Sadowsky, 1934

= Alosa tanaica =

Species of fish

Alosa tanaica, known as the Azov shad or Black Sea shad, is a species of alosid fish endemic to the Ponto-Caspian basin. It is an anadromous species, spawning in the lower reaches of rivers. It is widespread in the eastern Black Sea, the Kerch Strait and the Sea of Azov.

The same common names (Black Sea shad, Azov shad) are used also for another species, Alosa maeotica.
