= Kaynarca, Sakarya =

Kaynarca
- District and municipality
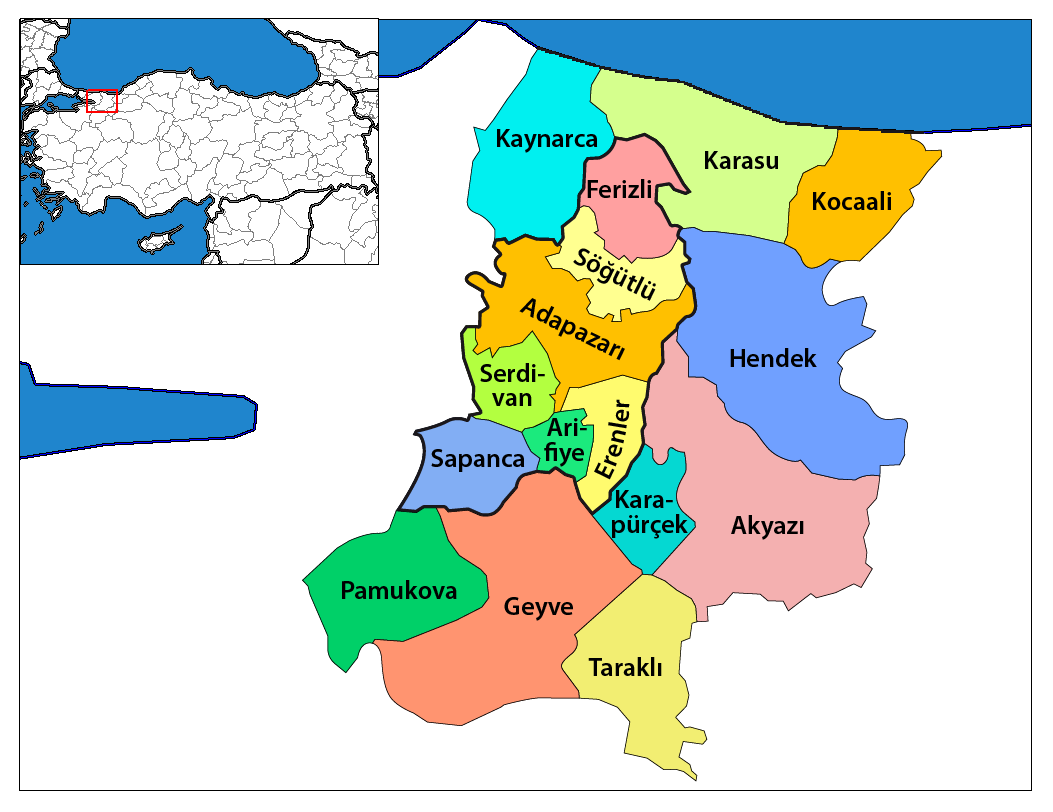
- Map showing Kaynarca District in Sakarya Province

- Location within Turkey Location within Marmara
- Coordinates: 41°01′51″N 30°18′27″E
- Country: Turkey
- Province: Sakarya

Government
  - Mayor: Kadir Yazgan (YRP)
- Area: 343 km^{2} (132 sq mi)
- Population (2022): 24,483
  - Density: 71.4/km^{2} (185/sq mi)
- Time zone: UTC+3 (TRT)
- Postal code: 54650
- Area code: 0264
- Climate: Cfa
- Website: sakaryakaynarca.bel.tr

Kaynarca, formerly Şeyhler, is a municipality and district of Sakarya Province, Turkey. Its area is 343 km^{2}, and its population is 24,483 (2022). The mayor is Kadir Yazgan (YRP).

The nature reserve Acarlar Floodplain Forest, which is Turkey's biggest mono-bloc floodplain forest, is located northeast of Kaynarca.

== Composition ==
There are 45 neighbourhoods in Kaynarca District:

- Akbaşlı
- Arifağa
- Başoğlu
- Birlik
- Büyükyanık
- Cebek
- Dudu
- Eğrioğlu
- Gaziler
- Gölce
- Gürpınar
- Güven
- Hatipler
- İmamlar
- İşaret
- Kalburcu
- Karaçalı
- Karamanlar
- Kayacık
- Kertil
- Kırktepe
- Kızılcaali
- Konak
- Küçükkaynarca
- Küçükkışla
- Kulaklı
- Merkez Mahalle
- Müezzinler
- Okçular
- Ömerağa
- Orta Mahalle
- Ortaköy
- Osmanlı
- Sabırlı
- Sarıbeyli
- Şeyhtımarı
- Taşoluk
- Topçu
- Turnalı
- Uğurlu
- Uzakkışla
- Uzunalan
- Yeniçam
- Yeşilova
- Ziahmet
