= Ferizli =

- District and municipality
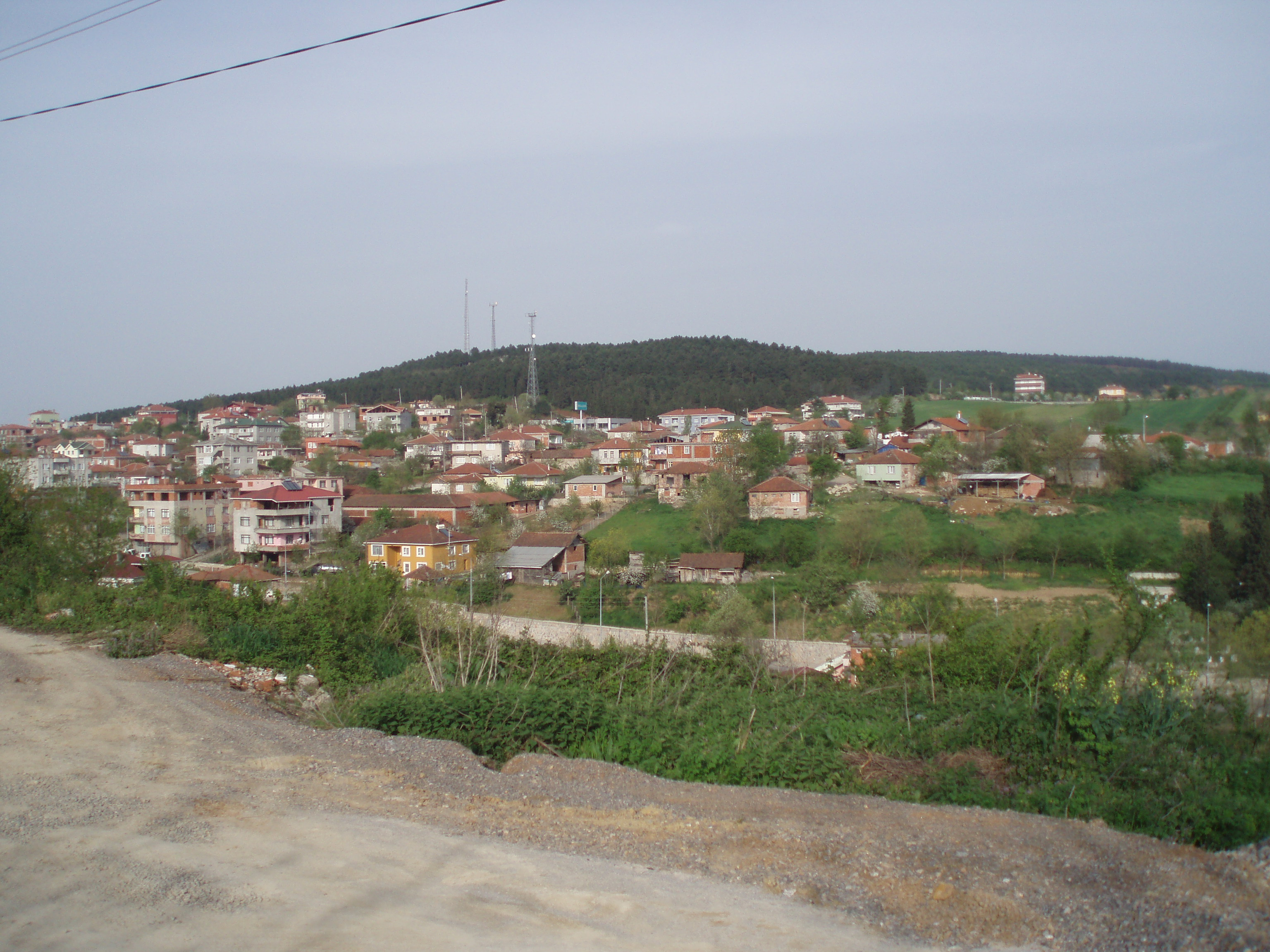

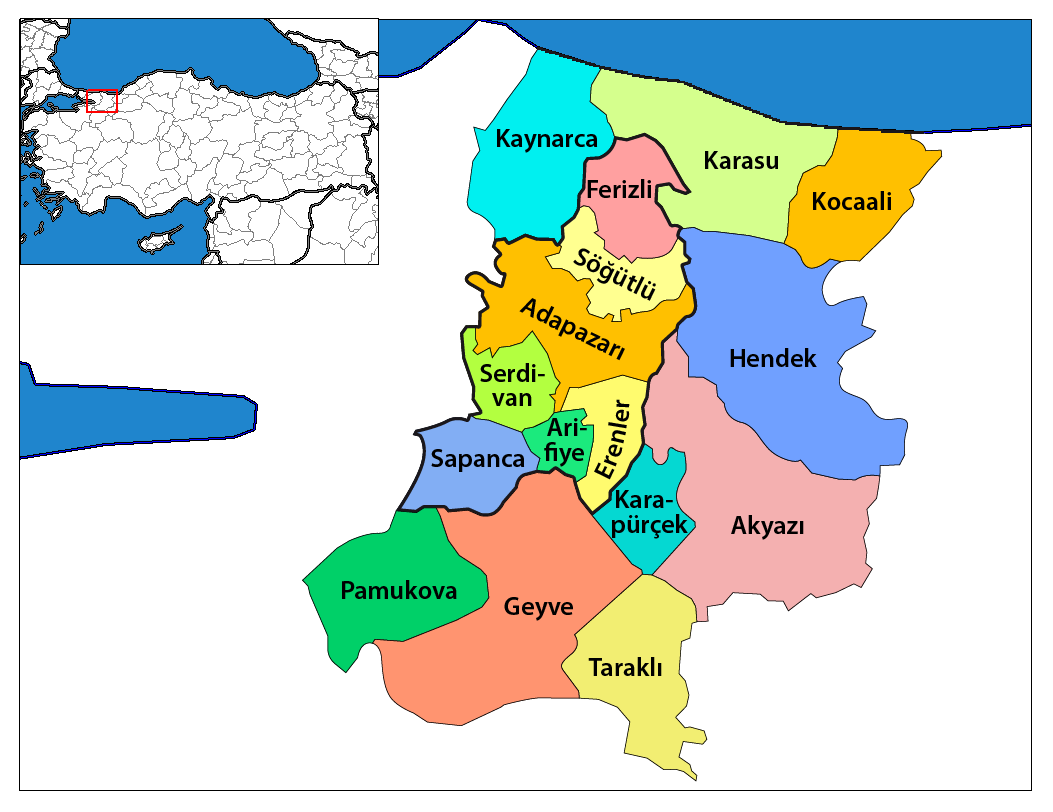
- Map showing Ferizli District in Sakarya Province

- Location within Turkey Location within Marmara
- Coordinates: 40°56′N 30°29′E
- Country: Turkey
- Province: Sakarya

Government
  - Mayor: Mehmet Ata (İYİ)
- Area: 173 km^{2} (67 sq mi)
- Population (2022): 30,741
  - Density: 178/km^{2} (460/sq mi)
- Time zone: UTC+3 (TRT)
- Postal code: 54110
- Area code: 0264
- Climate: Cfa
- Website: www.ferizli.bel.tr

Ferizli is a municipality and district of Sakarya Province, Turkey. It takes its name from Feriz or Feyzi Ağa who lived in the region. The name used as Firuzlu during the Ottoman period took its current form over time. It is recorded that it was founded as Feriz or Feyzi Ağa Farm around 1400-1406, with the settlement of Armenians from Sivas who escaped from the tyranny of Timur. The farmland spread to the villages of Damlık in the east and Elmalık in the southwest. The town of Adapazarı (Donigaşen) was also founded by Armenian immigrants under the protection of the same bey.

Its area is 173 km^{2}, and its population is 30,741 (2022). The mayor is Mehmet Ata (iYi).

== Composition ==
There are 24 neighbourhoods in Ferizli District:

- Abdürrezzak
- Ağacık
- Akçukur
- Bakırlı
- Ceylandere
- Damlık
- Değirmencik
- Devlet
- Doğancı
- Gölkent
- Hocaoğlu
- İnönü
- İstiklal
- Karadiken
- Kemalpaşa
- Kuzca
- Nalköy
- Osmanağa Çiftliği
- Sarıahmetler
- Seyifler
- Sinanoğlu
- Teberik
- Tokat
- Yeni
