= Karapürçek =

- District and municipality
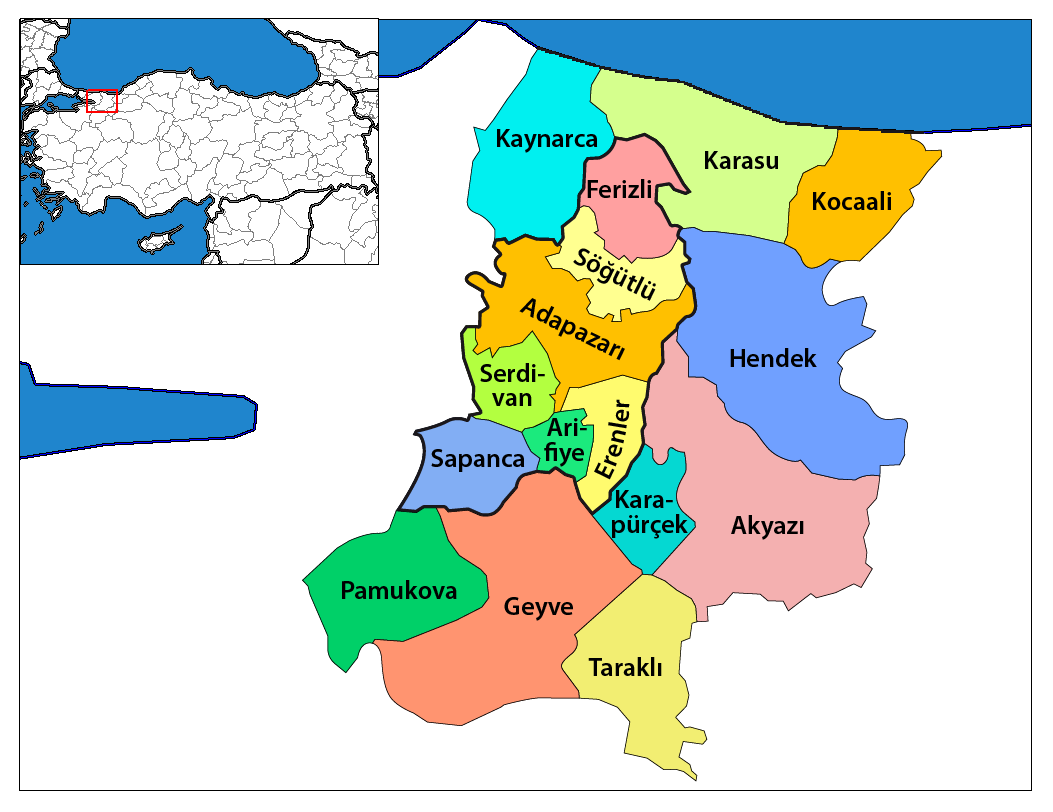
- Map showing Karapürçek District in Sakarya Province

- Location within Turkey Location within Marmara
- Coordinates: 40°38′33″N 30°32′19″E
- Country: Turkey
- Province: Sakarya

Government
  - Mayor: Mehmet Murat Çoruhlu (YRP)
- Area: 142 km^{2} (55 sq mi)
- Elevation: 150 m (490 ft)
- Population (2022): 13,339
  - Density: 93.9/km^{2} (243/sq mi)
- Time zone: UTC+3 (TRT)
- Postal code: 54430
- Area code: 0264
- Climate: Cfa
- Website: www.karapurcek.bel.tr

Karapürçek is a municipality and district of Sakarya Province, Turkey. Its area is 142 km^{2}, and its population is 13,339 (2022). The mayor is Mehmet Murat Çoruhlu(YRP).

== Composition ==
There are 14 neighbourhoods in Karapürçek District:

- Ahmediye
- Ahmetler
- Çeşmebaşı
- Cumhuriyet
- Hocaköy
- İnönü
- Kanlıçay
- Kızılbayır
- Küçükkarapürçek
- Mecidiye
- Meşepınarı
- Mesudiye
- Yazılıgürgen
- Yüksel
