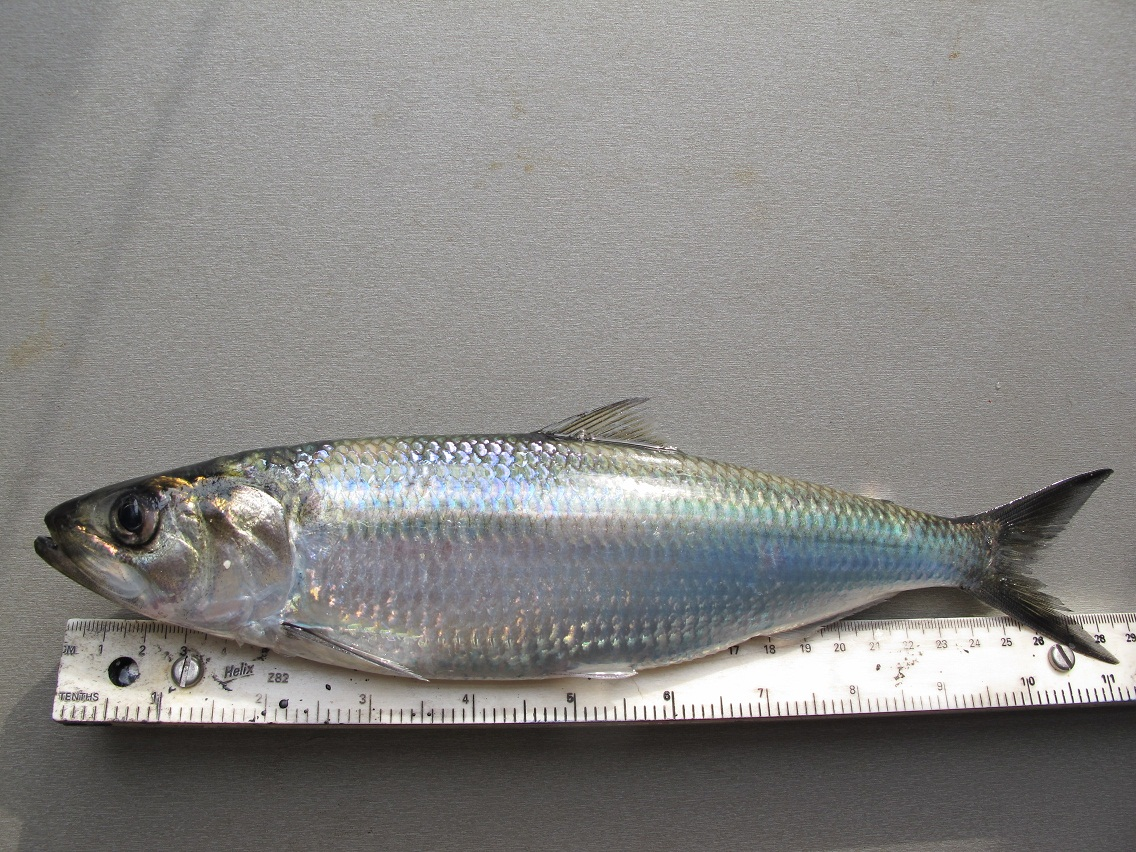

Conservation status
- Least Concern (IUCN 3.1)

Scientific classification
- Kingdom: Animalia
- Phylum: Chordata
- Class: Actinopterygii
- Order: Clupeiformes
- Family: Alosidae
- Genus: Alosa
- Species: A. maeotica

Binomial name
- Alosa maeotica (Grimm, 1901)

= Alosa maeotica =

Species of fish

Alosa maeotica, known as the Black Sea shad or Azov shad, is a species of Alosid fish endemic to the Sea of Azov and the western part of the Black Sea basin. It is found in Bulgaria, Georgia, Moldova, Romania, Russia, Turkey, and Ukraine.

This is one of the several shad species endemic the Ponto-Caspian basin. Note that the same common names (Black Sea shad, Azov shad) are connected also to another species, Alosa tanaica.
