= Söğütlü =

- District and municipality
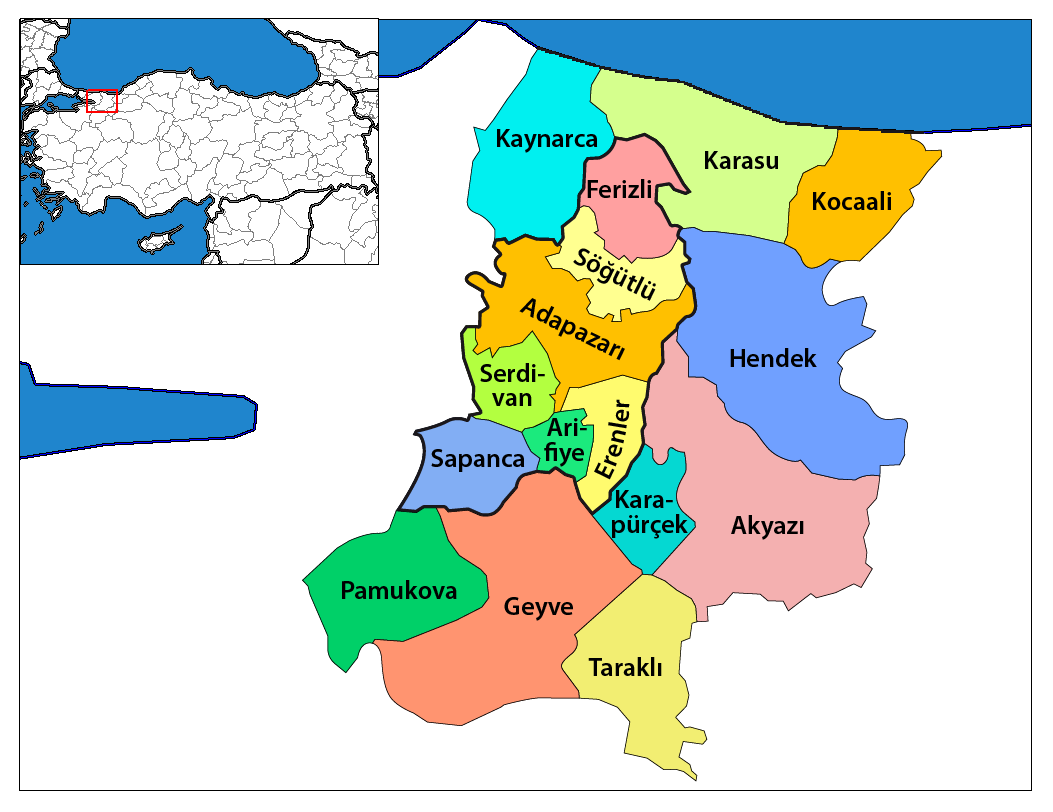
- Map showing Söğütlü District in Sakarya Province

- Location within Turkey Location within Marmara
- Coordinates: 40°54′N 30°29′E
- Country: Turkey
- Province: Sakarya

Government
  - Mayor: Koray Oktay Özten (AKP)
- Area: 145 km^{2} (56 sq mi)
- Population (2022): 14,724
  - Density: 102/km^{2} (263/sq mi)
- Time zone: UTC+3 (TRT)
- Postal code: 54160
- Area code: 0264
- Climate: Cfa
- Website: www.sogutlu.bel.tr

Söğütlü is a municipality and district of Sakarya Province, Turkey. Its area is 145 km^{2}, and its population is 14,724 (2022). The mayor is Koray Oktay Özten (AKP).

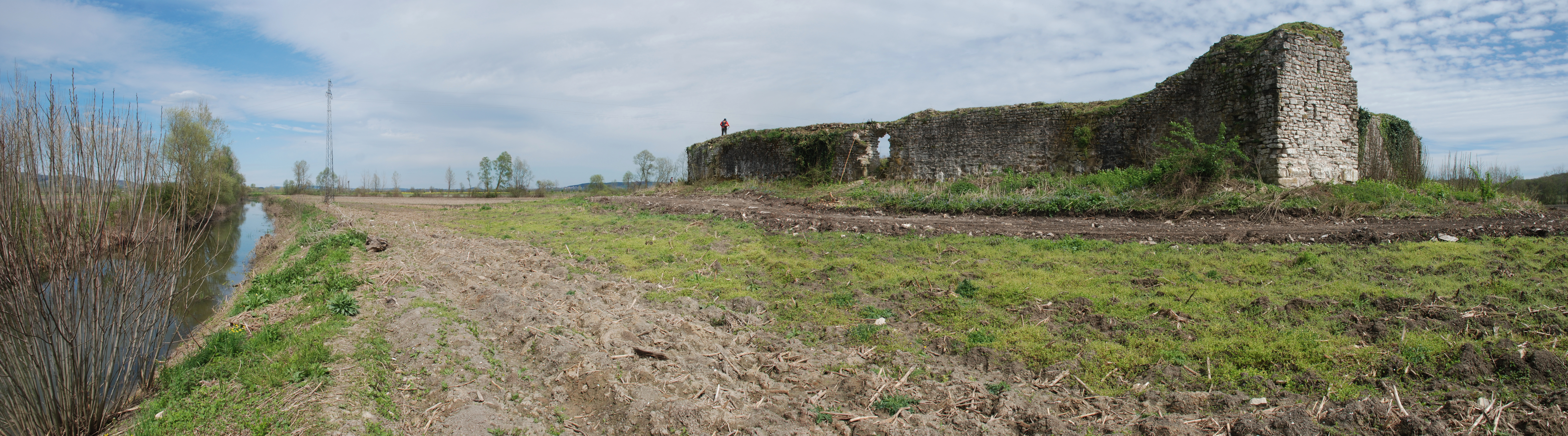
Harmantepe castle in Söğütlü district

== Composition ==
There are 23 neighbourhoods in Söğütlü District:

- Akarca
- Akçakamış
- Akgöl
- Beşdeğirmen
- Camicedid
- Fındıklı
- Gündoğan
- Hasanfakı
- İmamlar
- Kantar
- Karateke
- Küçüksöğütlü
- Kurudil
- Levent
- Mağara
- Maksudiye
- Orta
- Rüstemler
- Sıraköy
- Soğucak
- Tokmaklıdere
- Türkbeylikkışla
- Yeniköy
