= Karasu, Sakarya =

Karasu
- District and municipality
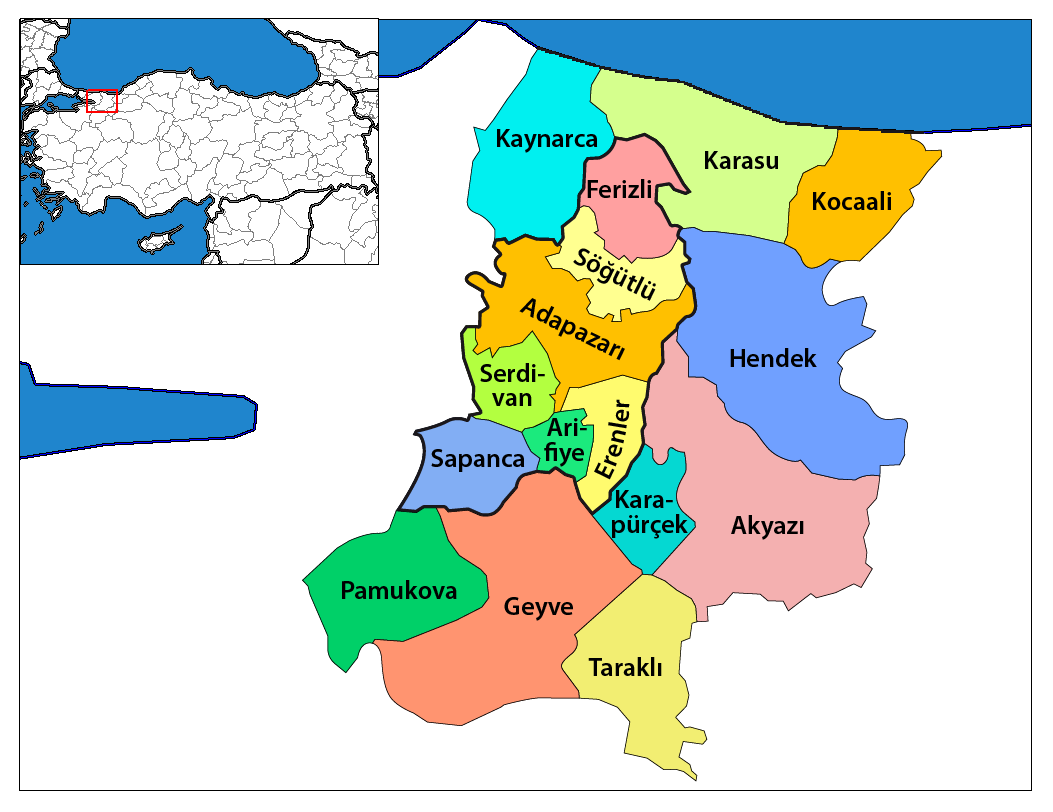
- Map showing Karasu District in Sakarya Province

- Location within Turkey Location within Marmara
- Coordinates: 41°6′13″N 30°41′37″E
- Country: Turkey
- Province: Sakarya

Government
  - Mayor: İshak Sarı (AKP)
- Area: 411 km^{2} (159 sq mi)
- Population (2022): 70,600
  - Density: 172/km^{2} (445/sq mi)
- Time zone: UTC+3 (TRT)
- Postal code: 54500
- Area code: 0264
- Climate: Cfb
- Website: www.karasu.bel.tr

Karasu is a municipality and district of Sakarya Province, Turkey. Its area is 411 km^{2}, and its population 70,600 (2022). It is on the Black Sea coast, and its population increases in the summer due to tourism. Much of its commerce centers on hazelnut farming and tourism.

The Acarlar Floodplain Forest is located partly in Karasu.

== Economy ==
Historically, Karasu has produced zinc and lead, whose mining started here in 1898. From the start of World War I, production in the area declined.

Today, the economy of Karasu district is primarily driven by agriculture and seasonal coastal tourism. Hazelnut farming is the most significant agricultural activity and the main source of income for the local population. The district is one of the important hazelnut production centers in the Black Sea region of Turkey. However, fluctuations in the free market hazelnut prices and increasing agricultural input costs frequently impact the local economy and farmers' revenues.

In addition to agriculture, summer tourism plays a vital role in the district's economy. The extensive sandy beaches along the Black Sea coast, natural attractions like the Acarlar Floodplain Forest, and various camping areas attract a large number of domestic and international tourists, significantly boosting local commerce and the service sector during the summer months.

== Composition ==
There are 40 neighbourhoods in Karasu District:

- Adatepe
- Akkum
- Ardıçbeli
- Aziziye
- Camitepe
- Çatalövez
- Darıçayırı
- Denizköy
- Gölköprü
- Hürriyet
- İhsaniye
- İncilli
- Kabakoz
- Kancalar
- Karamüezzinler
- Karanlıkdere
- Karapınar
- Karasu
- Kızılcık
- Konacık
- Kurudere
- Kurumeşe
- Kuyumcullu
- Kuzuluk
- Limandere
- Manavpınarı
- Ortaköy
- Paralı
- Resuller
- Subatağı
- Taşlıgeçit
- Tepetarla
- Tuzla
- Üçoluk
- Yalı
- Yassıgeçit
- Yeni
- Yenidoğan
- Yeşilköy
- Yuvalıdere
