= Pamukova =

- District and municipality
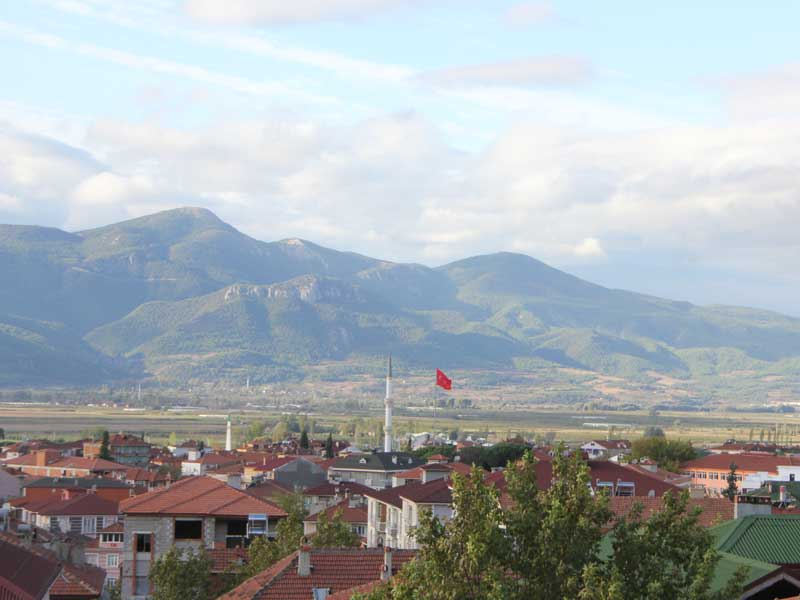

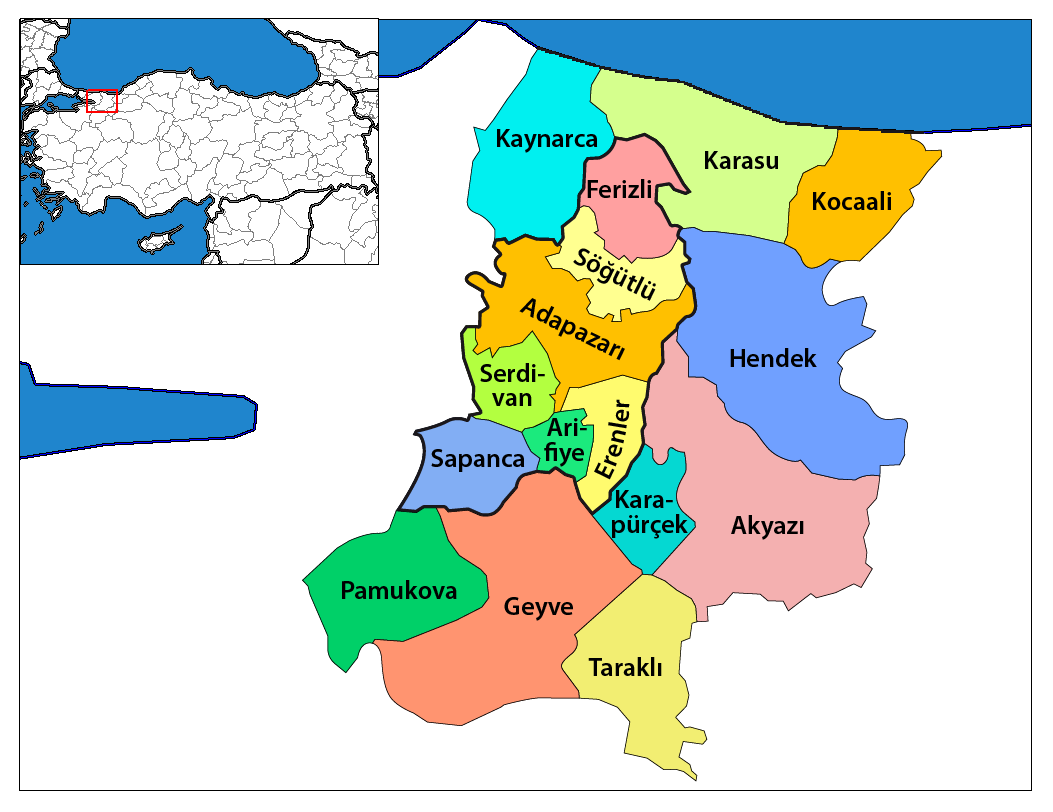
- Map showing Pamukova District in Sakarya Province

- Location within Turkey Location within Marmara
- Coordinates: 40°31′N 30°10′E
- Country: Turkey
- Province: Sakarya

Government
  - Mayor: Fatih Akin (AKP)
- Area: 289 km^{2} (112 sq mi)
- Population (2022): 30,482
  - Density: 105/km^{2} (273/sq mi)
- Time zone: UTC+3 (TRT)
- Postal code: 54900
- Area code: 0264
- Climate: Csa
- Website: www.pamukova.bel.tr

Pamukova is a municipality and district of Sakarya Province, Turkey. Its area is 289 km^{2}, and its population is 30,482 (2022). The mayor is Fatih Akin (AKP). The town has been identified as the Byzantine assembly place of Malagina.

== Composition ==
There are 33 neighbourhoods in Pamukova District:

- Ağaççılar
- Ahılar
- Akçakaya
- Bacıköy
- Bakacak
- Bayırakçaşehir
- Çardak
- Cihadiye
- Çilekli
- Cumhuriyet
- Eğriçay
- Elperek
- Eskiyayla
- Fevziye
- Gökgöz
- Gonca
- Hayrettin
- Hüseyinli
- İsabalı
- Kadıköy
- Karapınar
- Kazımiye
- Kemaliye
- Mekece
- Oruçlu
- Özbek
- Paşalar
- Pınarlı
- Şahmelek
- Şeyhvarmaz
- Teşvikiye
- Turgutlu
- Yenice
