= Sakarya Province =

Province of Turkey

- Province and metropolitan municipality
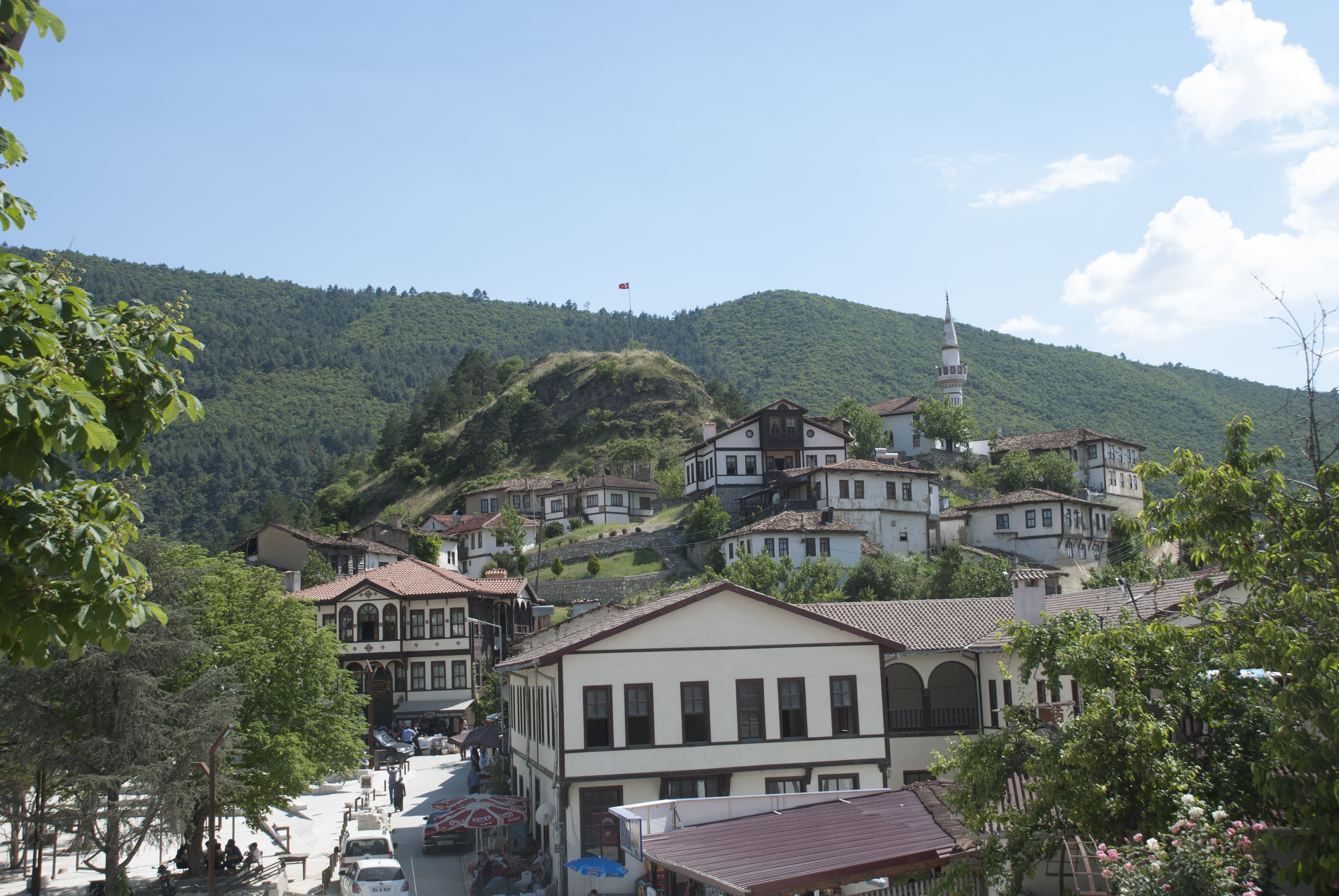

- Logo

- Location of the province within Turkey
- Coordinates: 40°41′50″N 30°27′24″E
- Country: Turkey
- Seat: Adapazarı

Government
  - Mayor: Yusuf Alemdar (AKP)
  - Vali: Rahmi Doğan
- Area: 4,824 km^{2} (1,863 sq mi)
- Population (2022): 1,080,080
  - Density: 223.9/km^{2} (579.9/sq mi)
- Time zone: UTC+3 (TRT)
- Area code: 0264
- Website: www.sakarya.bel.tr www.sakarya.gov.tr

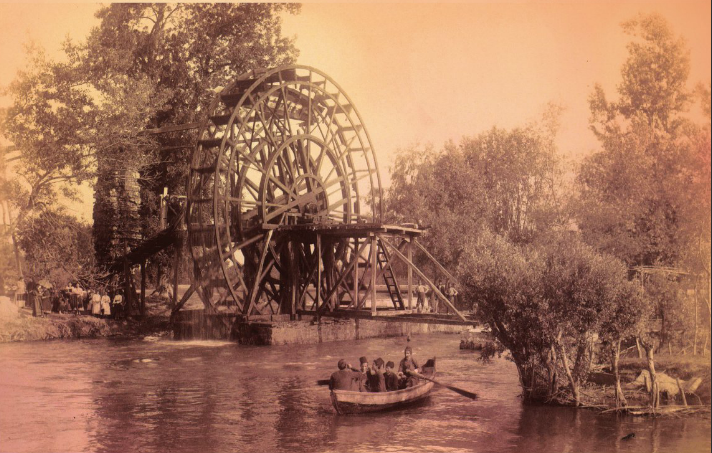
Water wheel built in Adapazarı in 1894 to supply water from the Çark Creek.

Sakarya (Turkish: Sakarya ili) is a province and metropolitan municipality in Turkey, located on the coast of the Black Sea. Its area is 4,824 km^{2} (1,863 sq mi), and its population is 1,110,735 (2024). The Sakarya River creates a webbing of estuaries in the province, which is in the Marmara Region. The adjacent provinces are Kocaeli to the west, Bilecik to the south, Bolu to the southeast and Düzce to the east. The capital of Sakarya is Adapazarı. Its climate is maritime in the north and humid subtropical in the south and changes by the distance to the Black Sea. Sakarya is on the Ankara-Istanbul highway and is also connected by rail. Sakarya is serviced by Istanbul's Sabiha Gökçen International Airport. The mayor of Sakarya is Yusuf Alemdar as of 2024 (AKP). The city of Sakarya, one of the most important cities in Turkey for its rapid growth and development, is known for its natural surroundings and culture. Home to several resort towns, Sakarya has access to the sea, beaches, lakes, rivers, highlands, thermal springs, traditional Ottoman lifestyle districts such as Taraklı and Geyve and noteworthy historical relics from the Byzantine and the Ottoman eras. The Turks conquered the city of Sakarya in the 13th century. There was intensive immigration from the Caucasus and the Balkans in the 18th and the 19th centuries. The last massive immigration was in 1989 from Bulgaria. The province's location at a transportation crossroads has made spurred development in the manufacturing sector, and it still has inward migration from other parts of Turkey.

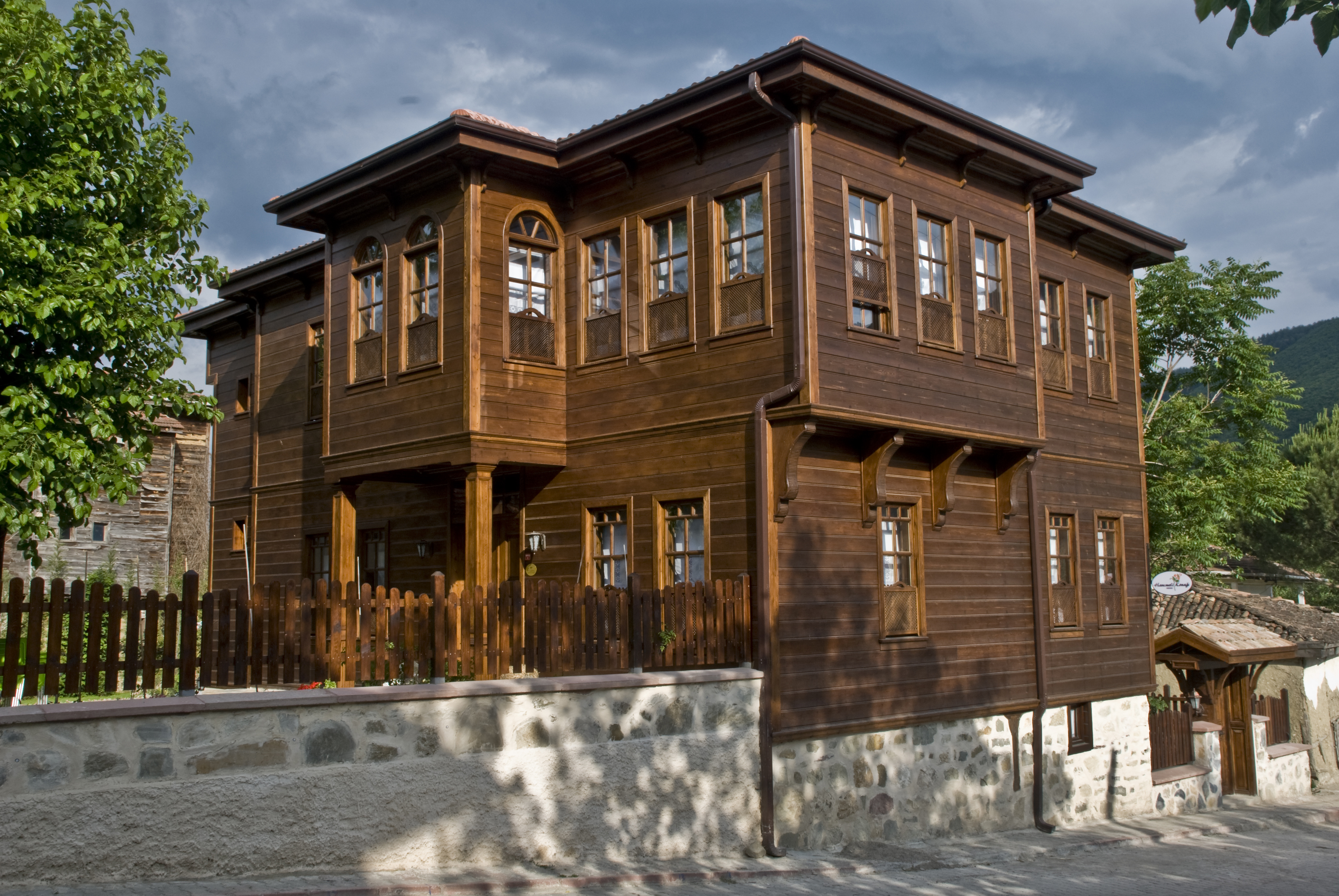
Historical Hanımeli Mansion in Taraklı

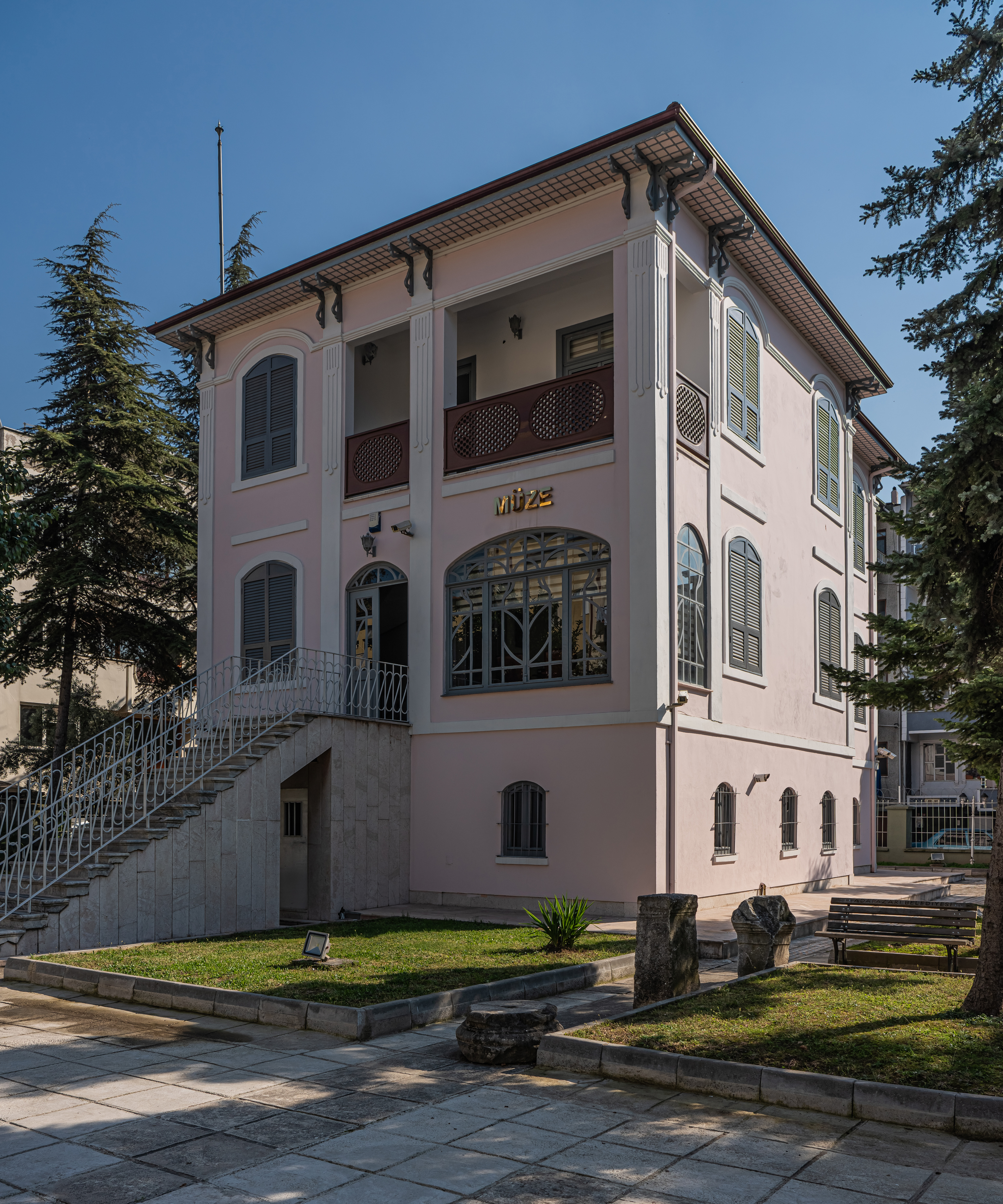
Sakarya Museum

== History ==
=== Ancient, Roman and Byzantine periods ===
The history of Sakarya begins with the Hittites. After the Hittites split as a result of internal strife, the Phrygians came to dominate the region. When Phrygian rule ended, the region fell into the hands of the Lydians. In the 6th century BCE, the Persian Empire overthrew the Kingdom of Lydia and established control over Anatolia. Alexander the Great, King of Macedonian Empire, defeated the Persians in the 4th century BCE and established control over Anatolia. After Alexander the Great’s death, the Kingdom of Bithynia declared its independence and asserted its rule over the region, including Sakarya. In the first century BCE, the Roman Empire put an end to the Kingdom of Bithynia and incorporated the region into its territory.

The castles of Seyifler, Harmantepe, Tersiye, Paşalar, Çobankale, and Mekece, built in the region, along with the Sangarius Bridge, constructed by Justinian I over the Sakarya River in 562, are significant historical sites.

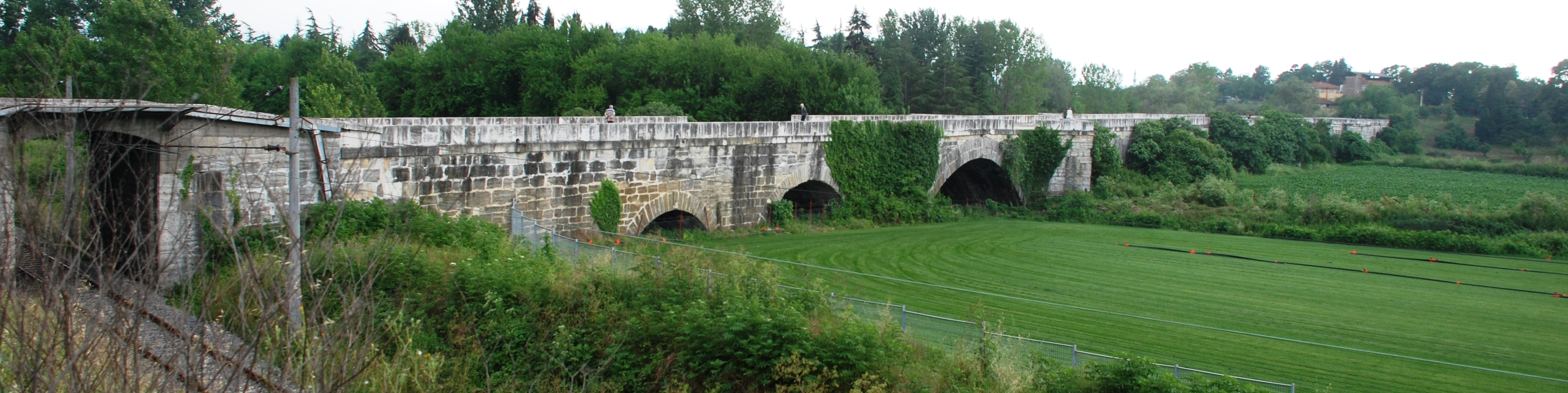
Sangarius Bridge, built by Byzantine Emperor Justinian I in 562

=== Ottoman period ===
Toward the end of the 13th century, Konur Alp reestablished Turkish rule by conquering what is now the Adapazarı Basin. In honor of these conquests carried out during the reign of Orhan Gazi, "Orhan Mosques" were built in the Sakarya region and its surroundings in the sultan’s name. Initially, nomadic Turkic tribes from Western Turkistan and Azerbaijan settled in the region, establishing villages and towns.

Sakarya's center district Adapazarı was founded by 400 Armenian immigrant families who escaped from Timur's campaigns in Sivas and was named "Donigaşen" after the name of their leaders.

A French count named A. De. Moustier, who traveled through the region, wrote the following in 1862: “Adapazarı is a town of 10,000 people on the banks of the river. Walnut trees are plentiful, but new ones are not being planted to replace those that are cut down. At this rate, Adapazarı will be left treeless." In those years, walnut wood was used in Adapazarı to make pistol and rifle grips.

Adapazarı was a subdistrict under Bolu in 1646 was reclassified as a village in 1658, as a district in 1692, as a village under Sapanca in 1701, as a subdistrict in 1742, and as a district under the Izmit Sanjak in 1837. Adapazarı, which was attached to the Kocaeli Mutasarrifate in 1852, became a province in 1954 and was named "Sakarya".

=== Modern history ===
Adapazarı was experiencing a rapid growth and great development in the centre of Akova, but the city had to face massive destruction during the great Marmara earthquake, on August 17, 1999.

== Geography ==
The province’s topography is divided into three main sections:

- The low-lying hilly areas in the north
- The Adapazarı Plain in the central region
- The rugged mountainous areas in the south

Located north of the North Anatolian Fault, the Çatalca-Kocaeli Plateau extends from the west to the Sakarya River. With the exception of the Çam Dağı massif, the northern regions are an extension of the Çatalca-Kocaeli Plateau.

The Adapazarı Plain (Akova) was formed by alluvial deposits carried by the Sakarya River. The Adapazarı and Düzce plains, which are extensions of the Gulf of İzmit and Lake Sapanca, are tectonically formed plains. The plain contains alluvial deposits up to 400 meters thick. Plains account for 34% of the province’s land area, plateaus for 44%, and mountains for 22%.

== Districts ==
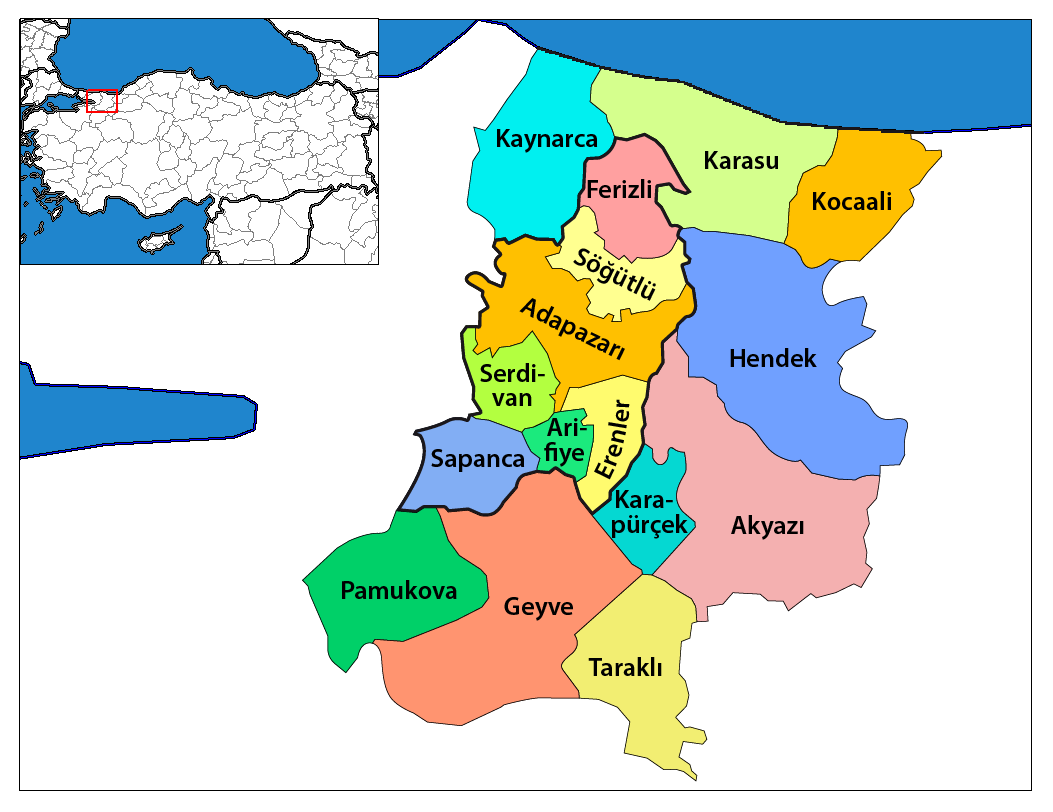

Greater Adapazarı

- Adapazarı
- Arifiye
- Erenler
- Ferizli
- Sapanca
- Serdivan
- Söğütlü

Area: 1,156 km^{2}, Population: 691,217 (2024)

Rest of Sakarya

- Akyazı
- Geyve
- Hendek
- Karapürçek
- Karasu
- Kaynarca
- Kocaali
- Pamukova
- Taraklı

Population: 419,518 (2024)

== Transport ==
In the province of Sakarya, several modes of transportation are available for moving within the city, between districts, and to other cities.

=== Ground transport ===
==== Buses ====
The buses, operated by Sakarya Metropolitan Municipality, are the most common type of transport in the province. The bus network is well-developed and covers most areas. To pay for travel, a transport card (for example, Kent Kart or Kart 54) is usually used, which can be purchased and topped up at special kiosks or vending machines. The rolling stock consists of Otokar and BMC buses. Additionally, there are two articulated buses (Mercedes-Benz Conecto and BMC Procity 18M), which are usually used on crowded routes as well as on the metrobus line.

==== Minibuses (dolmuşlar) ====
The minibuses connect the Sakarya province with many other districts, such as Arifiye, Hendek, Geyve and Pamukova. They run on established routes and often do not have fixed stops, so passengers can board and disembark at convenient locations along the route by informing the driver.

==== Metrobus ====
The metrobus line in Sakarya is the second in the whole Turkey after Istanbul. Its building started on 19 December 2024 and lasted till the summer of 2025. On 15 July 2025, the first part of the line was opened, running between the railway station square and the governor. In December 2025, the line was extended to the Korucuk hospital. Currently, the line has a length of 19.5 km with 13 stops on the route. The rolling stock consists of 11 Otokar Kent XL articulated buses.

=== Railway transport ===
==== Adaray ====
Adaray is a short-line commuting railway service running between Arifiye and Adapazarı. There are 7 stations on the route and the overall journey time takes about 15 minutes. Adaray was first launched in 2013 and ran till 2016. The service was restarted on 29 October 2024 and it is currently planned to extend the line to Sapanca.
