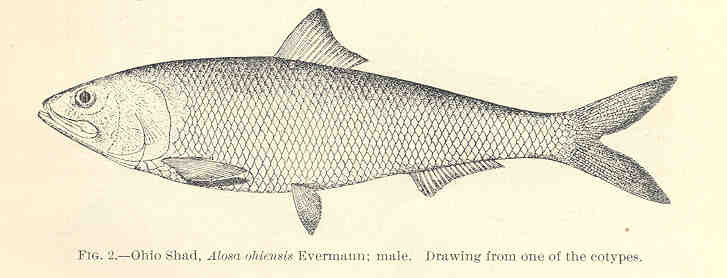

Conservation status
- Near Threatened (IUCN 3.1)

- Imperiled (NatureServe)

Scientific classification
- Kingdom: Animalia
- Phylum: Chordata
- Class: Actinopterygii
- Division: Teleostei
- Order: Clupeiformes
- Family: Alosidae
- Genus: Alosa
- Species: A. alabamae

Binomial name
- Alosa alabamae Jordan & Evermann in Evermann, 1896

Synonyms
- Alosa ohiensis (Evermann, 1902)

= Alabama shad =

Species of fish

The Alabama shad (Alosa alabamae) is an anadromous species of alosid fish endemic to the United States where it breeds in medium to large flowing rivers from the Mississippi River drainage to the Suwannee River, Florida, as well as some other Gulf coast drainages. The biology of this fish is little known but it has become increasingly rare. The International Union for Conservation of Nature rated it "near threatened" in 2020 and the United States National Marine Fisheries Service has listed it as a Species of Concern. A principal reason for its decline is thought to be the many locks and dams blocking access for the fish to up-river spawning grounds.

== Description ==
The Alabama shad grows to be 12–18 inches (30–46 cm) in length and may reach 3 pounds (1.4 kg). The upper jaw of the fish bears a median notch. The Alabama shad has 42 to 48 gill rakers on the first gill arch's lower limb, which is intermediate between those of two anadromous clupeids from the Atlantic coast, the hickory shad (Alosa mediocris) and the American shad (A. sapidissima). It can be distinguished from skipjack herring (A. chrysochloris) again by its gill raker count, as well as a lower jaw that is either equal in length to or extends only slightly beyond the upper, pigmented markings on its lower jaw that extend posteriorly beyond the cusp and the presence of only one row of teeth along its tongue. The dorsal fin usually has 16 or more rays and the last ray does not extend into a filament, unlike in threadfin shad (Dorosoma petenense) and American gizzard shad (D. cepedianum).

== Distribution ==
The Alabama shad spawns in medium to large flowing rivers from the Mississippi River drainage to the Suwannee River, Florida. They are found in some Gulf coast drainages, but are thought to be extirpated from those drainages west of the Pascagoula River drainage in Mississippi.

== Ecology ==
Alabama shad are a schooling species. Within sandbar and channel habitat types in the Pascagoula River, Mickle (2010) found that juvenile shad preferred locations with cooler water temperatures. Juveniles remain in fresh water for the first six to eight months of their lives, feeding on small fishes and invertebrates.

== Biology ==
The biology of the species is not well known. Spawning usually occurs around 19–23 °C (66–73 °F) in Gulf of Mexico drainages. Alabama shad historically ran as far northeast as the Monongahela River to spawn, likely in mid-June. Males seemingly weigh less than the females and mortality occurs after spawning as with numerous other species of the Alosa genus, although repeat spawning, as determined by counting of spawning marks on scales, has been described in certain drainage populations. The fish lives for approximately three or four years.

== Evolution ==
The closest living relative of Alosa alabamae is the American shad, A. sapidissima. The ancestor of A. alabamae may have swum around the Florida peninsula and become geographically isolated no earlier than the Pleistocene epoch.

== Conservation ==
Although once abundant enough to support commercial fisheries in Alabama, Arkansas, Kentucky, Indiana and Iowa, Alabama shad are now rare throughout much of their former range. At one point, Alosa alabamae were found in the Ohio River as well. The species is thought to have declined largely because of the many locks and dams blocking access to spawning areas and alterations in hydrology and river substrates.

The Alabama shad is a U.S. National Marine Fisheries Service Species of Concern, one of those species about which the U.S. Government's National Oceanic and Atmospheric Administration has some concerns regarding status and threats, but for which insufficient information is available to indicate a need to list the species under the U.S. Endangered Species Act (ESA). On April 20, 2010, a number of organizations submitted a petition to list the species as threatened or endangered under the ESA, which was initially rejected. On September 19, 2013, however, the National Marine Fisheries Service (NMFS) published a 90-day finding that listing under the ESA may be warranted and announced the initiation of a status review. The NMFS denied ESA listing for A. alabamae in its 12-month finding, published in 2017, though it also found that there was uncertainty in the sampling data and scarce historical data available to support a decision.

A more recent study by Rider, Powell, Dattilo & Miles (2021) concluded that the Alabama shad had likely been extirpated from the Mobile River basin and that a 98% decline in abundance occurred between 1999–2000 and 2018 in the Choctawhatchee River. They observed a small number of shad in the Conecuh River in 2010. It is likely that the largest remaining population is the one that spawns in the ACF River Basin (Apalachicola/Chattahoochee/Flint River system).

The IUCN Red List indicates A. alabamae as a near-threatened species. The American Fisheries Society lists it as threatened.
