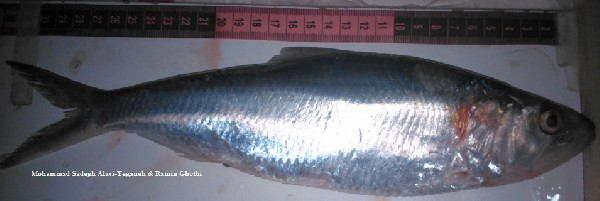

Conservation status
- Data Deficient (IUCN 3.1)

Scientific classification
- Kingdom: Animalia
- Phylum: Chordata
- Class: Actinopterygii
- Division: Teleostei
- Order: Clupeiformes
- Family: Alosidae
- Genus: Alosa
- Species: A. braschnikowi

Binomial name
- Alosa braschnikowi (Borodin, 1904)

Synonyms
- Clupea pontica var. braschnikowi Borodin, 1904; Caspialosa brashnikovi Borodin, 1904; Clupea caspiopontica var. grimmi Borodin, 1904; Clupeonella leucocephala Berg, 1913; Caspialosa brashnikovi autumnalis Berg, 1915; Caspialosa caspia nigra Kisselevich, 1923; Caspialosa kisselevitschi Bulgakov, 1926; Caspialosa nirchi Morozov, 1928; Caspialosa brashnikovi kenderlensis B. I. Badamshin, 1938; Caspialosa brashnikovi orientalis Mikhailovsky, 1941; Caspialosa brashnikovi agrachanica Mikhailovsky, 1941; Caspialosa brashnikovi sarensis Mikhailovsky, 1941; Caspialosa brashnikovi derzhavini V. M. Tarasevich, 1946

= Alosa braschnikowi =

Species of fish

Alosa braschnikowi, the Caspian marine shad or Brazhnikov's shad, is a species of ray-finned fish belonging to the family Alosidae, the shads and sardines. This fish is endemic to the Caspian Sea, where it is found in brackish water.

== Taxonomy ==
Alosa braschnikowi was first formally described as Clupea pontica var. braschnikowi in 1904 by the Russian ichthyologist Nikolai Andreyevich Borodin with its type locality given as near Fort Alexandrovsk in the middle Caspian Sea in Kazakhstan. This taxon is classified in the genus Alosa, the shads, in the family Alosidae, the shads and sardines, in the order Clupeiformes, the herring-like fishes.

The following subspecies have been recognised:

- Alosa braschnikowi agrachanica (Mikhailovsky, 1941)
- Alosa braschnikowi autumnalis (Berg, 1915)
- Alosa braschnikowi brashnikovi (Borodin, 1904)
- Alosa braschnikowi grimmi (Borodin, 1904)
- Alosa braschnikowi kisselevitschi (Bulgakov, 1926)
- Alosa braschnikowi nirchi (Morozov, 1928)
- Alosa braschnikowi orientalis (Mikhallovsky, 1941)
- Alosa braschnikowi sarensis (Mikhallovsky, 1941)

Even Alosa curensis and Alosa maeotica have sometimes been listed as subspecies of A. brashnikovi; the latter is from the Pontic basin and now considered a distinct (non-Caspian) species. Several further synonyms exist.

== Etymology ==
Alosa braschnikowi is classified in the genus Alosa, a name referring to the Moselle, but is a tautonym of Linnaeus' Clupea alosa. The specific name honours the Russian zoologist Vladimir Konstantinovich Bražnikov who first recognised this species as a distinct form of A. saposchnikowii.

== Description ==
Alosa braschnikowi is a relatively large shad, typically 30 cm (12 in) and up to 50 cm (20 in)in standard length. It also has a more "herring-like" body shape than other Caspian shad species, being a slender and elongate fish. It has well developed teeth in both jaws.

== Distribution and habitat ==
Alosa braschnikowi is found in the brackish waters of the Caspian Sea at depths between 25 and 98 m (80 and 320 ft). The subspecies A. b. autumnalis, A. b. grimmi, A. b. kisselevitschi, A. b. nirchi, A. b. orientalis and A. b. sarensis are only found in the central and southern portions of the Caspian Sea and the subspecies A. b. braschnikowi and A. b. agrachanica are found everywhere in the Caspian Sea.

== Biology ==
Alosa braschnikowi feeds on small fishes but also on crustaceans and occasionally other invertebrates. It performs migrations within the Caspian Sea, but does not enter rivers. Several subspecies have been described, with different breeding habits and with varying gill raker numbers. In winter these shads winter off the Iranian coast on the southern Caspian Sea and move towards the shallower coastal waters to breed from March onwards.

== Utilisation ==
Alosa braschnikowi is an important species in the small scale commercial fisheries of northern Iran, with the majority of the catch being landed in the Spring. It represents 5% of the bony fish landed in the southern Caspian. There is some indication that the stock has been overfished.
