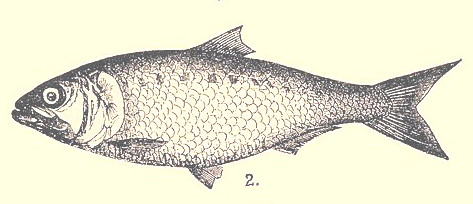

Conservation status
- Least Concern (IUCN 3.1)

Scientific classification
- Kingdom: Animalia
- Phylum: Chordata
- Class: Actinopterygii
- Order: Clupeiformes
- Family: Alosidae
- Genus: Alosa
- Species: A. caspia

Binomial name
- Alosa caspia (Eichwald, 1838)

= Alosa caspia =

Species of fish

Alosa caspia is a species of alosid fish, classified as one of the shad species (genus Alosa) endemic to the Caspian Sea basin.

FishBase treats separately three subspecies from the Caspian:

- Caspian shad, Alosa caspia caspia (Eichwald, 1838)
- Enzeli shad, Alosa caspia knipowitschi (Iljin, 1927)
- Astrabad shad, Alosa caspia persica (Iljin, 1927)

Previously, the taxonomic circumscription and geographic range of A. caspia were broader, encompassing the Sea of Azov and Black Sea basins. At one point, up to ten subspecies were recognised; these included forms now classified as Alosa tanaica (and its synonyms) and even the Balkan freshwater endemics Alosa macedonica and Alosa vistonica.
