= Alosa algeriensis =

Conservation status
- Endangered (IUCN 3.1)

Scientific classification
- Kingdom: Animalia
- Phylum: Chordata
- Class: Actinopterygii
- Order: Clupeiformes
- Family: Alosidae
- Genus: Alosa
- Species: A. algeriensis

Binomial name
- Alosa algeriensis Regan, 1916

Species of fish

Alosa algeriensis, the North African shad, is a Mediterranean species of clupeid fish in the shad genus Alosa.

== Location ==
Alosa algeriensis is primarily found in the Mediterranean Sea from northern Morocco to northern Tunisia. There are also landlocked populations in Lake Ichkeul, Tunisia and Sardinia, Italy.

== Biology and life cycle ==
Alosa algeriensis males will begin upriver migration at about 3–4 years old while females do not begin until about 4–5 years old. The juveniles migrate to the mouth of rivers until they mature. Once temperatures rise above 20 degrees Celsius, they will begin their spawn. Mortality usually occurs after spawning. Mortality after spawning is very common in species of the genus Alosa. This is primarily around the month of May.

== See also ==
- Shad fishing
