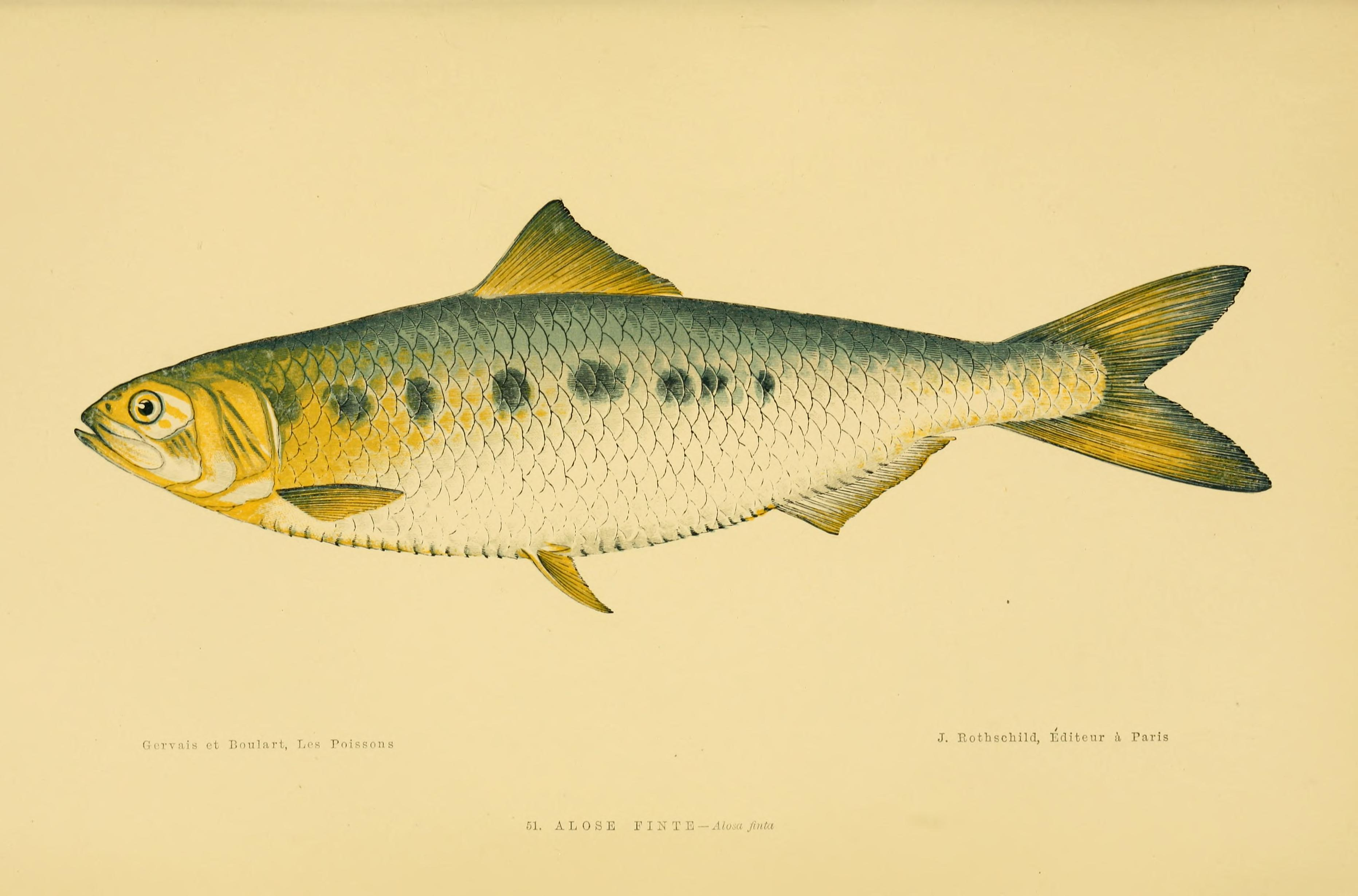

Conservation status
- Least Concern (IUCN 3.1)

Scientific classification
- Kingdom: Animalia
- Phylum: Chordata
- Class: Actinopterygii
- Order: Clupeiformes
- Family: Alosidae
- Genus: Alosa
- Species: A. agone

Binomial name
- Alosa agone (Scopoli, 1786)

= Alosa agone =

Species of fish

Alosa agone is a species of ray-finned fish in the genus Alosa. It is an endangered species.

== Species description ==
Alosa agone are common in the Mediterranean and the western Balkans. There are also landlocked populations found in Italy. The distribution of reproductive communities and the conservation status of Alosa agone in the central and eastern parts of the Mediterranean areas are poorly known.

== Conservation ==
The numbers of Alosa agone have declined due to barriers such as dams in their local areas. These barriers prevent them from getting upstream to their spawning grounds and reproducing. Improved water quality in some landlocked lakes has increased their numbers in recent years.

== Biology ==
The "twaite shad" are known to be very adaptive and variable as they form landlocked populations in Italy and its neighboring areas, including the western Balkans. They can modify their morphology and biology according to their environment. Therefore, Alosa agone, just like many Alosa species, can be either marine or freshwater fish.

== See also ==
- Shad fishing
