= Killarney shad =

Conservation status
- Vulnerable (IUCN 3.1)

Scientific classification
- Kingdom: Animalia
- Phylum: Chordata
- Class: Actinopterygii
- Division: Teleostei
- Order: Clupeiformes
- Family: Alosidae
- Genus: Alosa
- Species: A. killarnensis

Binomial name
- Alosa killarnensis Regan, 1916

Species of fish

The Killarney shad (Alosa killarnensis), also called the goureen, is a freshwater fish in the family Alosidae, endemic to a single lake in Ireland, Lough Leane in County Kerry. Research has shown that it is a landlocked subspecies of the anadromous, twait shad (Alosa fallax), arriving in the lake after the Last Glacial Maximum about 10,000 years ago. This fish is at risk from eutrophication and the introduction of alien species of fish to the lake and the International Union for Conservation of Nature has rated it as "critically endangered".

== Distribution and status ==
Lough Leane in the Killarney National Park, southwestern Ireland, is only the place where this fish lives. It has been listed as critically endangered by the IUCN. Eutrophication and introduction of alien fish species such as common roach Rutilus rutilus and common bream Abramis brama are the most probable threats. The shad is also very sensitive to pollution.

The adopted method for conservation involves the identification of spawning sites and protecting them from declining water quality.

== Biology ==
The Killarney shad feeds in the pelagic zone of the lake and spawns in shallow bays. It has a life span of about five years. Males are smaller than the females. They generally feed on zooplankton, and spawn in June - July on gravel bars and gravelled shallows and around the islands of the lake.

== Systematics and population history ==
Most often the Killarney shad has been considered a landlocked subspecies of the anadromous, widespread twaite shad (Alosa fallax), with the name Alosa fallax killarnensis. DNA-studies confirm that the population is derived from the twaite shad and suggest it arrived in the lake after the Last Glacial Maximum when the ice sheet retreated from Ireland. Moreover, there would have been another invasion wave of twaite shad to the lake, also > 10 000 yr ago, which mixed with the first one. The landlocked population has evolved many morphological and ecological peculiarities in the short post-glacial time, and therefore it has been suggested to represent an independent young species. The Killarney shad is smaller than the twaite shad (only 20 cm), and has a low gill raker number.

While the Killarney shad is the only landlocked derivative of the twaite shad in NW Europe, several landlocked populations occur in Southern Europe, but they are not always taxonomically separated from Alosa fallax.
