= Blackback (disambiguation) =

A blackback is a sexually mature male gorilla of up to 11 years of age.

Blackback may also refer to:

- Alosa kessleri, a herring of the family Clupeidae
- Great blackback, a very large gull which breeds on the European and North American coasts and islands of the North Atlantic
- Lesser blackback, a large gull which breeds on the Atlantic coasts of Europe
- Kelp gull, a large gull that breeds throughout the Southern Hemisphere

== See also ==
- Black back, a flatfish of the family Pleuronectidae
