= Fish Disco =

Experimental acoustic deterrent system

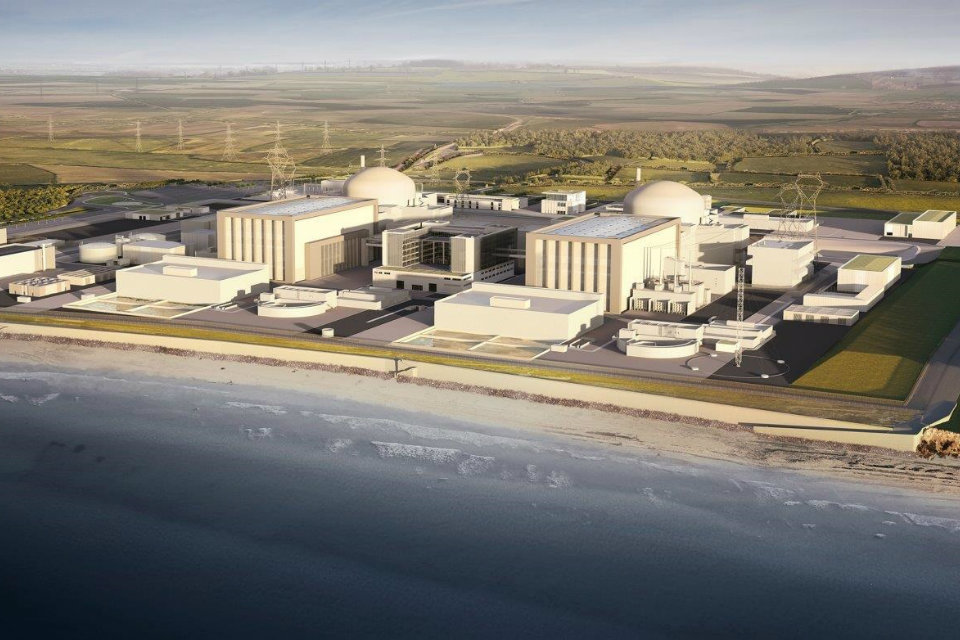
A 3D model of Hinkley Point C where the "fish disco" is being implemented

Fish Disco is the name given to a proposed acoustic fish deterrent (AFD) system aimed at protecting fish from being sucked into the cooling system of Hinkley Point C nuclear power station.

== Background ==
In 2021, an expert panel held investigations on behalf of the Welsh Government into the impact of the power stations cooling system on fish populations. Although it was reported that the power station could suck in up to 182 million fish a year, the CEFAS study TR456 Ed 2 suggested that the absence of an AFD would not have adverse effects on local ecosystems. Other measures included

== Acoustic Deterrent System ==
Among the measures proposed to protect fish was an acoustic deterrent system, the "fish disco" itself. It consists of ultrasonic speakers which deter fish from coming near water intakes. The system was developed by Fishtek Marine, whose managing director expressed optimism that it could be replicated and used at other plants.

== Reception ==
The fish protection measures at Hinkley Point C were expected to cost £700 million in total, with the "fish disco" making up £50m of the cost. The high costs were used to criticise the systems as excessive, with the power station already exceeding its budget significantly. Potential delays were also blamed on the litigation surrounding the calls for such systems.

The builders of the plant, Électricité de France, would report a significant success rate of the acoustic system following an experimental run at Swansea University, although it had previously reported that in absolute terms few fish would be saved. Natural England would deem the measures insufficient and require further protections before signing off on any plans, acknowledging successes in protecting the twaite shad in trials but citing concerns over other fish such as the Atlantic salmon.
