= Alosa vistonica =

Conservation status
- Extinct (IUCN 3.1)

Scientific classification
- Kingdom: Animalia
- Phylum: Chordata
- Class: Actinopterygii
- Order: Clupeiformes
- Family: Alosidae
- Genus: Alosa
- Species: †A. vistonica

Binomial name
- †Alosa vistonica Economidis & Sinis, 1986

Synonyms
- A. caspia vistonica (orig. comb.) Economidis & Sinis, 1986

Species of fish

Alosa vistonica the Thracian shad, is an extinct species of shad, a freshwater fish in the family Alosidae. It was endemic to a single shallow lake, Lake Vistonida in northeastern Greece. It was officially declared extinct by the International Union for Conservation of Nature in October 2024 as the species has not been recorded within its only known distribution since 1995.

It was likely driven to extinction through pollution sewage and industrial effluents, destruction of spawning sites by agricultural development and increased salinity following the opening of a canal into the sea.

== Description ==
A. vistonica reached a maximum length of 17 cm (SL). It is distinguished from other members of its genus entering freshwater of the Mediterranean basin by having 78–97 gill rakers and well-developed teeth on the palatine and vomer, especially in juveniles.

== Taxonomy ==
Alosa vistonica was first formally described as Alosa caspia vistonica in 1986 by Panos Stavros Economidis and Apostolos I. Sinis with its type locality given as Lake Vistonida. This species is now classified in the genus Alosa, which was proposed by Johann Heinrich Friedrich Link in 1797, within the family Alosidae in the order Clupeiformes, the herrings and related fishes.

== Etymology ==
Alaosa vistonica belongs to the genus Alosa, a derivatuion of alausa the Latin name for Clupea alosa which is the type species of the genus through absolute tautonymy. The specific name, vistonica, means "of Vistonis", meaning Lake Vistonida, the only place this fish was known to occur.

== See also ==
- Killarney shad
