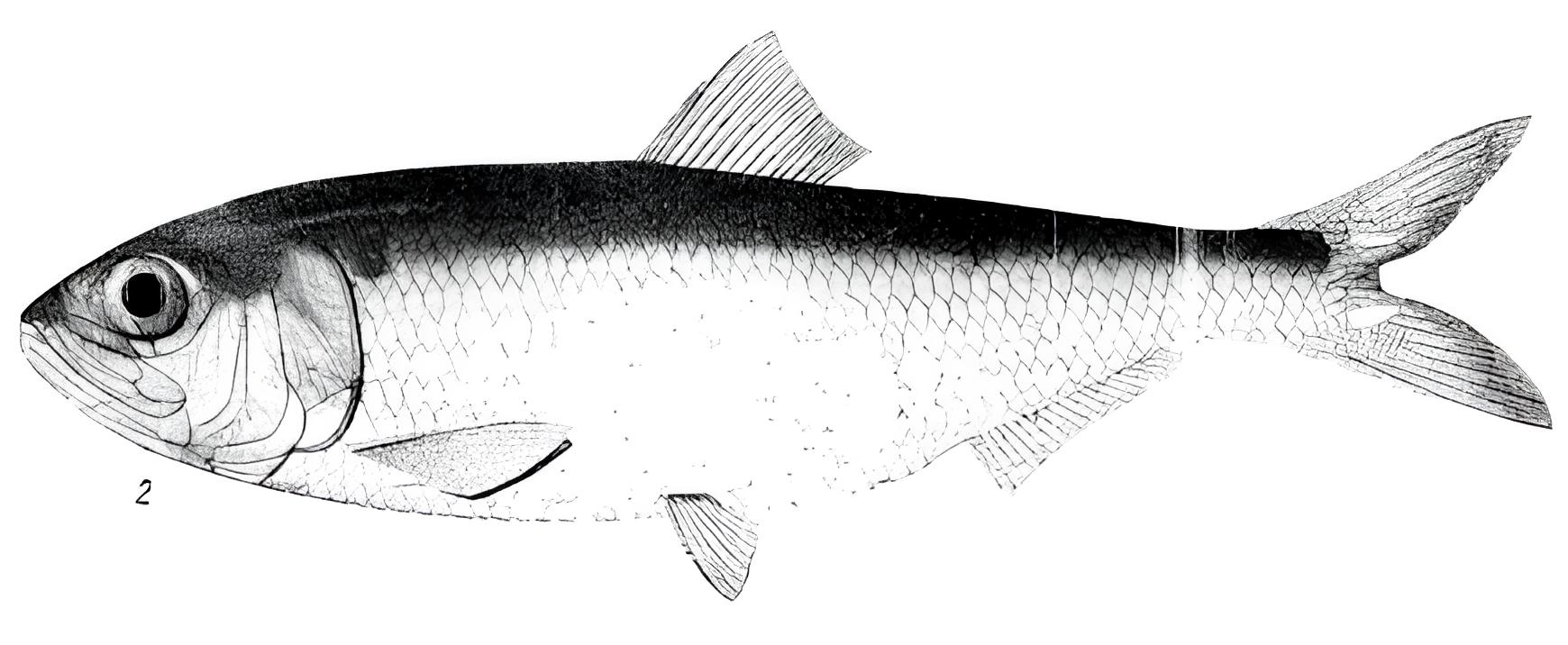

Conservation status
- Least Concern (IUCN 3.1)

Scientific classification
- Kingdom: Animalia
- Phylum: Chordata
- Class: Actinopterygii
- Order: Clupeiformes
- Family: Alosidae
- Genus: Alosa
- Species: A. sphaerocephala

Binomial name
- Alosa sphaerocephala (L. S. Berg, 1913)

= Alosa sphaerocephala =

Agrakhan shad

Species of fish

Alosa sphaerocephala, or the Agrakhan shad, is a species of alosid (herring-like) fish, one of the endemic shad species in the Caspian Sea.

It spawns in shallow waters (about 3 m) of the northeastern part of the Caspian Sea, in salinities of 8-10 ppt. It does not enter fresh water. Spawning takes place in temperatures of 18-20 °C, from mid-May to end of June, and the young move southward relatively late in the autumn season.

== Footnotes ==
- Froese, Rainer; Pauly, Daniel (eds.). "Alosa sphaerocephala". FishBase.
