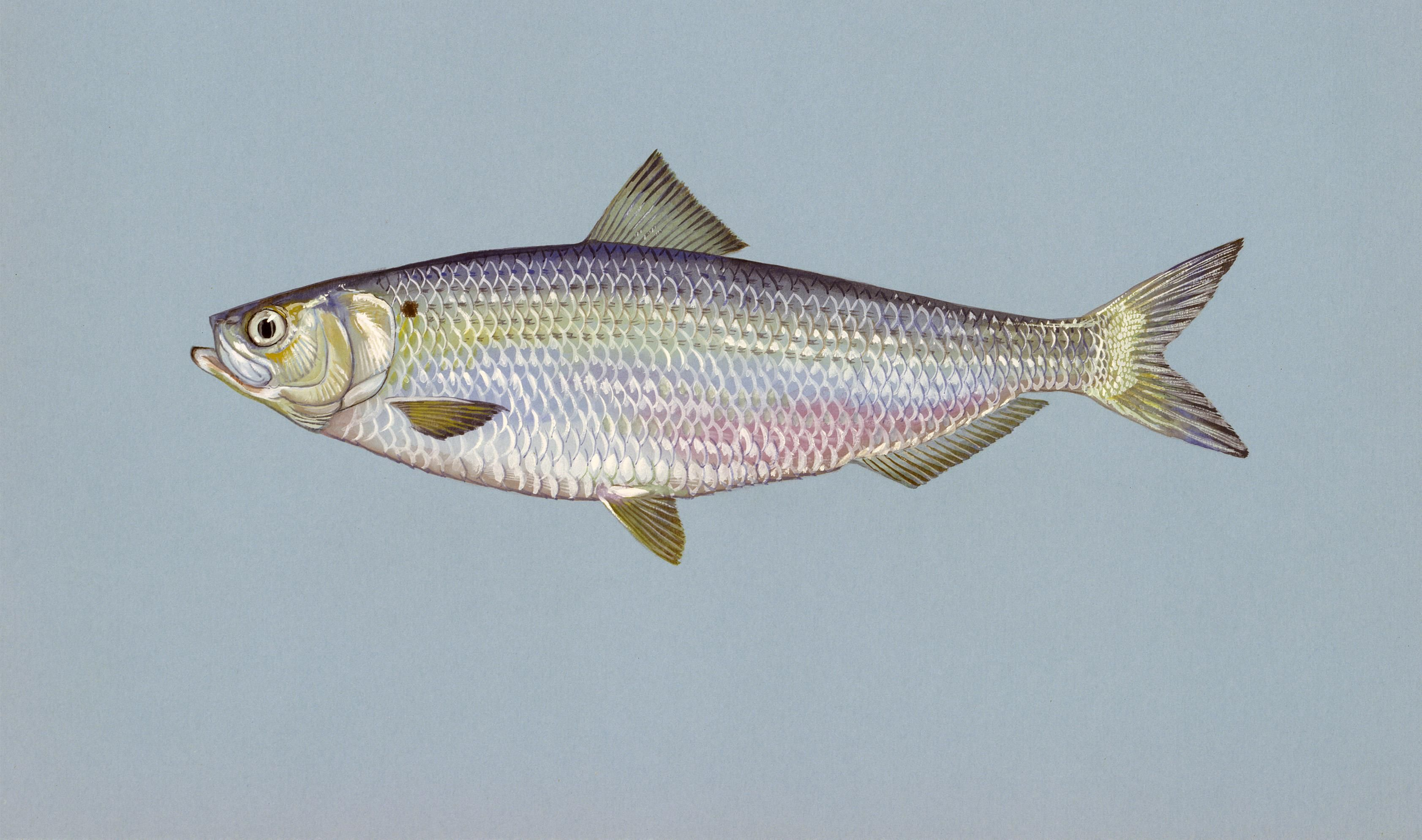
- Alosa aestivalis

Conservation status
- Vulnerable (IUCN 3.1)

Scientific classification
- Kingdom: Animalia
- Phylum: Chordata
- Class: Actinopterygii
- Order: Clupeiformes
- Family: Alosidae
- Genus: Alosa
- Species: A. aestivalis

Binomial name
- Alosa aestivalis (Mitchill, 1814)

Synonyms
- Pomolobus aestivalis Mitchill, 1814

= Blueback herring =

Species of fish

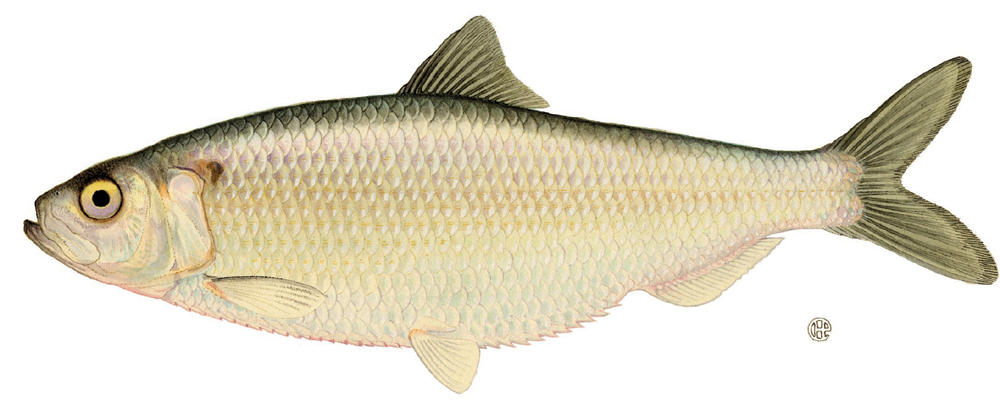
Alosa aestivalis

The blueback herring, blueback shad, or summer shad (Alosa aestivalis) is an anadromous species of herring from the east coast of North America, with a range from Nova Scotia to Florida. Blueback herring form schools and are believed to migrate offshore to overwinter near the bottom.

These fish are silvery in color, have a series of scutes (modified, spiny and keeled scales) along their bellies, and are characterized by deep bluish-green backs. They reach a maximum size of approximately 40 centimetres (16 in) and are believed to live up to 8 years. The most distinguishing characteristic of this species is the black to dusky color of its peritoneum (the lining of the abdominal cavity). It is one of the "typical" North American shads. They are often confused with alewifes because blueback shad and alewives are difficult to distinguish from one another, and together these two species are often regarded collectively as "river herring". Alewives have larger eyes, greater body depth, and pearly to white peritoneal linings.

This fish has, in the past, been used as a baitfish for the lobster fishing industry. It is also used for human consumption, usually smoked. It is caught (during its migration up stream) using large dip nets to scoop the fish out of shallow, constricted areas on its migratory streams and rivers.

== Range ==
The native range of this fish is found along the Atlantic Coast from Cape Breton, Nova Scotia, to the St. Johns River, Florida. During spawning season, it migrates into coastal rivers.

=== Non-indigenous occurrences ===
Blueback shad were first collected in Lake Ontario in 1995, and have been collected from the Tennessee River in Georgia and Tennessee; Oneida Lake, the Oswego River, and Lake Champlain in New York. In North Carolina, blueback shad were introduced into the Savannah, Broad, and Yadkin River basins, and into non-native areas of the Cape Fear and Roanoke River basins. It has been introduced to an unspecified location in the Chesapeake Bay basin in Pennsylvania. They have been collected in Lake Jocassee, Lake Keowee, Picalet River, Broad River, and Lake Murray in South Carolina. Stock obtained from the Cooper River, South Carolina, was released in Texas by the Texas Parks and Wildlife Department in Lake Theo, Briscoe County, and at an unidentified research site in North Texas in 1982 (and in the upper Red River drainage). Bluebacks have been collected from Lake Champlain, Vermont, and have been stocked in several inland reservoirs in Virginia, including Smith Mountain Lake, Occoquan Reservoir, Kerr Reservoir, and Lakes Anna, Brittle, and Chesdin. It is established as a species in Texas, New York, North Carolina, Vermont, and Virginia.

== Ecology ==
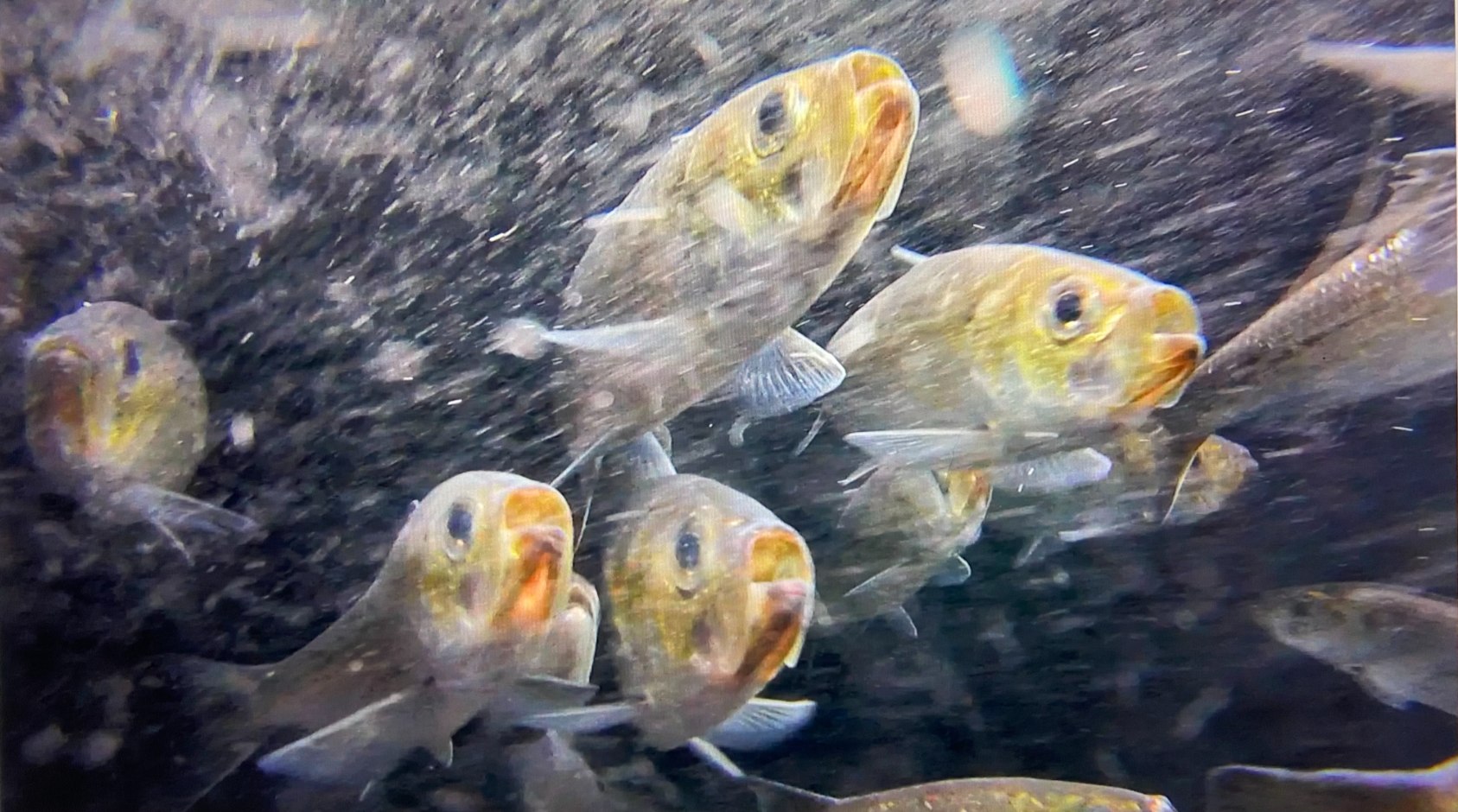
A school of blueback herring.

This fish is anadromous, living in marine systems and spawning in deep, swift freshwater rivers with hard substrates. It migrates to spawning grounds in the spring. In Connecticut, blueback shad spawn in 14 to 17 °C (57 to 63 °F) water, usually later in the spring than the alewife. During spawning, many eggs are deposited over the stream bottom, where they stick to gravel, stones, logs, or other objects. Juveniles spend three to seven months in fresh water, then migrate to the ocean. The blueback shad is a planktivorous forage species.

== Reproduction ==
Blueback herring spawn from late March through mid-May, depending on latitude. Females usually mature by age five and produce between 60,000 and 103,000 eggs. Males generally mature earlier at between 3 and 4 years of age and at a smaller size than the females. For both species, adults migrate quickly downstream after spawning and little is known about their life history while in the marine environment; however, they are believed to be capable of migrating long distances (over 1,900 kilometres (1,200 mi)).

== Specialist hearing ==
While the hearing of most fishes is limited in frequency to less than 1 kHz, blueback herring demonstrate an unusual ability to detect very high frequency sound (ultrasound) above 50 kHz

== Conservation ==
Blueback populations have exhibited drastic declines throughout much of their range. There are several threats that have most likely contributed to their decline. These threats include: loss of habitat due to decreased access to spawning areas from the construction of dams and other impediments to migration; habitat degradation; fishing; and increased predation due to recovering striped bass populations.

In response to the declining trend for river herring, the states of Alabama, Massachusetts, Rhode Island, Connecticut, Virginia, Delaware and North Carolina have instituted moratoriums on taking and possession.

The blueback herring is a U.S. National Marine Fisheries Service Species of Concern. Species of Concern are those species about which the U.S. Government's National Oceanic and Atmospheric Administration, National Marine Fisheries Service, has some concerns regarding status and threats, but for which insufficient information is available to indicate a need to list the species under the U.S. Endangered Species Act (ESA).
