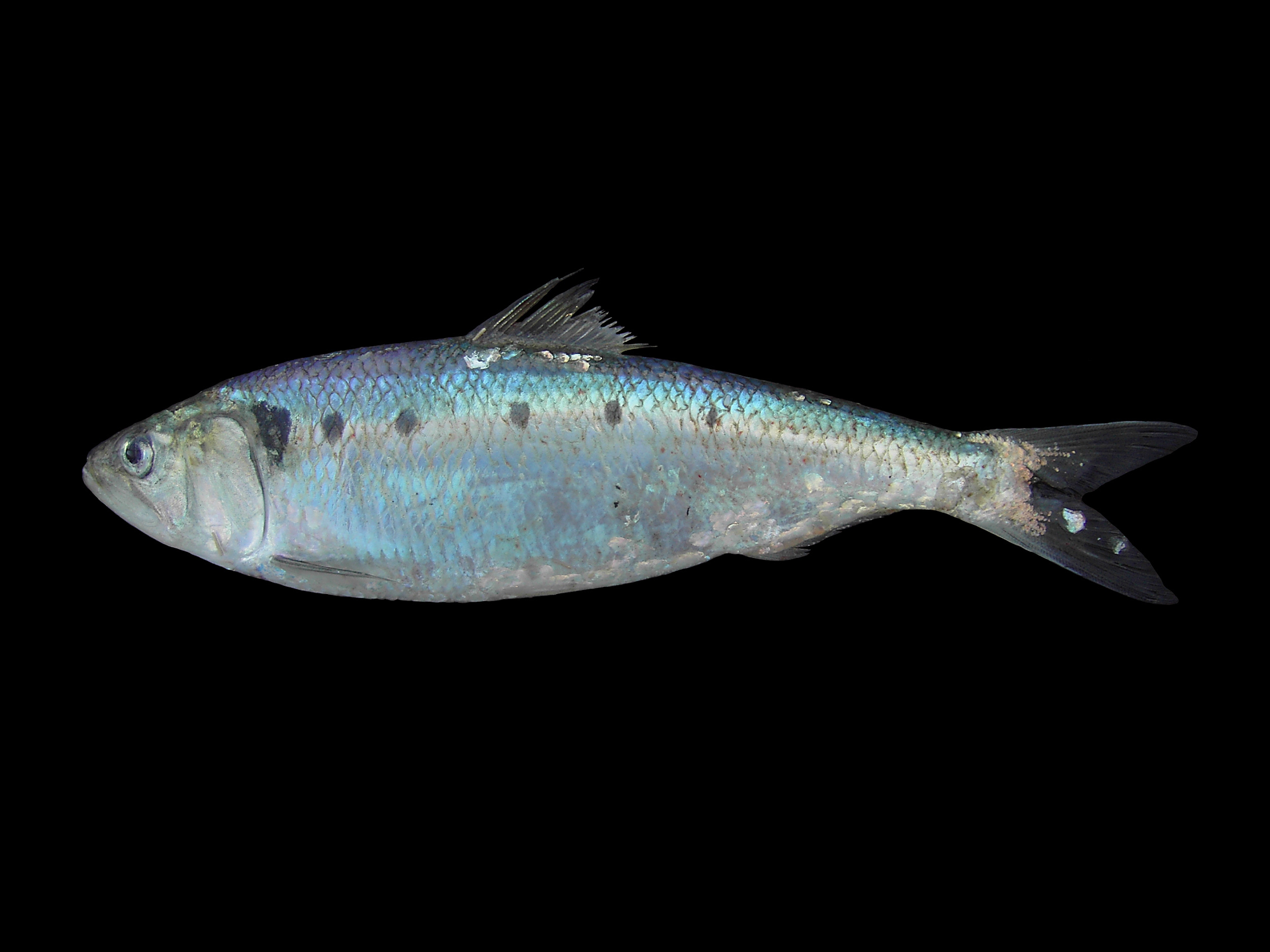
- Twaite shad, Alosa fallax

Scientific classification
- Kingdom: Animalia
- Phylum: Chordata
- Class: Actinopterygii
- Division: Teleostei
- Order: Clupeiformes
- Family: Alosidae
- Genus: Alosa; H. F. Linck, 1790

Type species
- Clupea alosa Linnaeus, 1758

Species
- See text.

Synonyms
- Pomolobus Rafinesque, 1820; Alausa Valenciennes, 1847; Alausella Gill, 1861; Caspialosa Berg, 1915; Paralosa Roule, 1925

= Alosa =

Alosa Temporal range: Oligocene to present Potential Late Eocene occurrence

Genus of fishes

Alosa is a genus of fish, the river herrings, in the family Alosidae. Along with other genera in the subfamily Alosinae, they are generally known as shads. They are distinct from other herrings by having a deeper body and spawning in rivers. Several species can be found on both sides of the Atlantic Ocean and the Mediterranean Sea. Also, several taxa occur in the brackish-water Caspian Sea and the Black Sea basin. Many are found in fresh water during spawning and some are only found in landlocked fresh water.

== Appearance ==
Alosa species are generally dark on the back and top of the head, with blue, violet, or greenish tints. Some can be identified as having a grey or green back. Spots are commonly found behind the head, and the fins may vary from species to species or individually. Most species of Alosa weigh 300 g (11 oz) or less, with A. pontica and A. fallax weighing up to 2 kg, and A. alosa can exceed 3–4 kg.

== Biology ==
Shads are thought to be unique among the fishes in having evolved an ability to detect ultrasound (at frequencies above 20 kHz, which is the limit of human hearing). This was first discovered by fisheries biologists studying a type of shad known as blueback herring, and was later verified in laboratory studies of hearing in American shad. This ability is thought to help them avoid dolphins that find prey using echolocation. Alosa species are generally pelagic. They are mostly anadromous or semianadromous with the exception of strictly freshwater landlocked species. Alosa species are generally migratory and schooling fish. Males usually mature about a year before females; they spawn in the late spring to summer. Most individuals die shortly after spawning. Alosa species seemingly can change readily to adapt to their environments, as species are found in a wide range of temperatures and waters.

== Lifecycle and reproduction ==
As Alosa species are generally anadromous, they face various obstacles to survival. They may have to pass through numerous barriers and waters to get to either their spawning grounds or normal habitats (the sea in most cases). Estuaries are a major factor in numerous Alosa species' migrations. Estuaries can be highly variable and complex environments contributing to fluctuating biological interactions, with shifts in osmolarity, food sources, predators, etc. Since many adult Alosa species die after spawning, only the young generally migrate to the sea from the spawning grounds. Duration of migration varies among fish, but can greatly affect survival.

Reproduction varies by species. Studies done on Alosa in Iranian waters have shown that spawning varies in time, place, and temperature of the waters they inhabit. Species are known to spawn as early as April or as late as August. Temperatures range from about 11 to 27 °C. Fecundity can range from 20,000 to 312,000 eggs. Eggs are pelagic. Geography and temperature are important environmental factors in egg and young-of-year development.

The lifespan of Alosa species can be up to 10 years, but this is generally uncommon, as many die after spawning.

== Systematics ==
The systematics and distribution of Alosa shads are complex. The genus inhabits a wide range of habitats, and many taxa are migratory. A few forms are landlocked, including one from Killarney in Ireland, two from lakes in northern Italy, and two in Greece. Several species are native to the Black and Caspian Seas. Alosa species of the Caspian are systemically characterized by the number of rakers on the first gill arch. They are classified as being "multirakered", "medium-rakered", or "oligorakered". The multirakered are primarily plankton feeders, the oligorakered have large rakers and are predators, and the medium-rakered generally consume a mixed diet. Most current species of the genus Alosa in North America can be found in Florida, whereas the distribution of most of them is broader.

Morphology is notoriously liable to adapt to changing food availability in these fish. Several taxa seem to have evolved quite recently, making molecular analyses difficult. In addition, hybridization may be a factor in shad phylogeny. Nonetheless, some trends are emerging. The North American species except the American shad A. sapidissima can probably be separated in a subgenus Pomolobus. Conversely, the proposed genus (or subgenus) Caspialosa for the Caspian Sea forms is rejected due to paraphyly.

=== Species by geographical origin ===
==== North America ====
- Alosa aestivalis (Mitchill, 1814) (blueback herring)
- Alosa alabamae D. S. Jordan and Evermann, 1896 (Alabama shad)
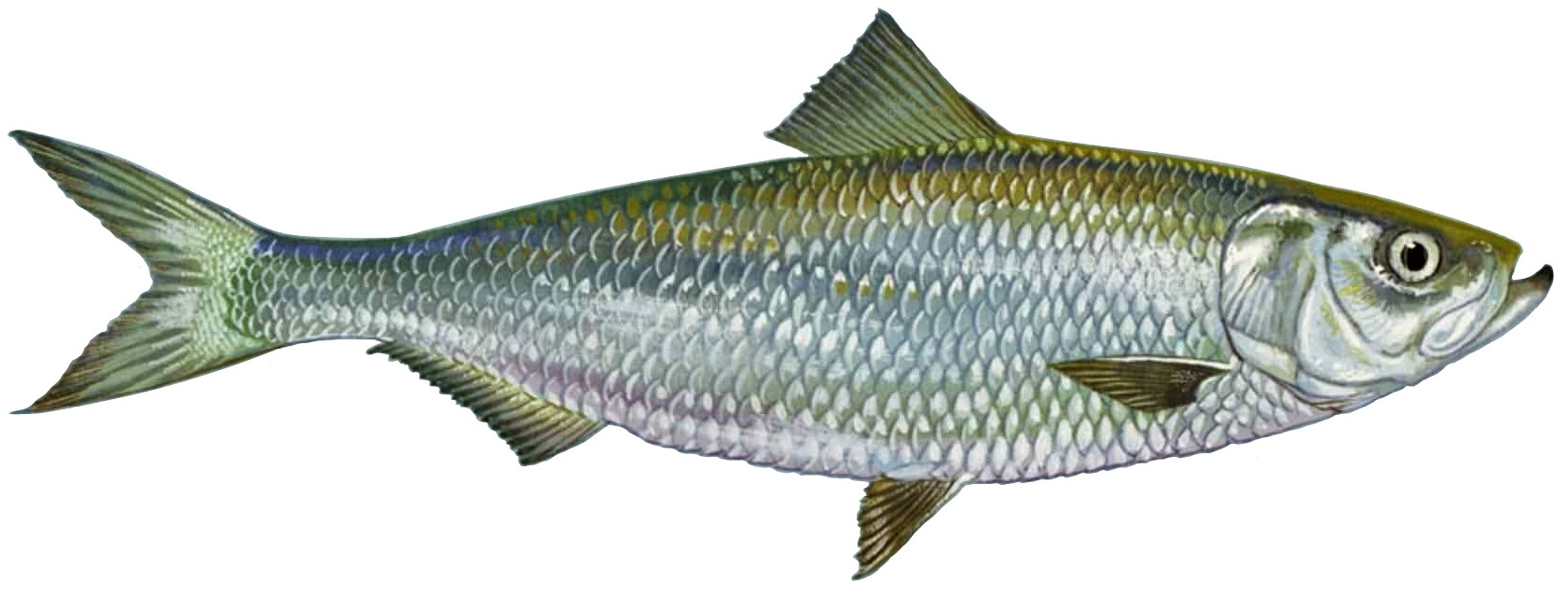
- Alosa chrysochloris (Rafinesque, 1820) (skipjack shad)
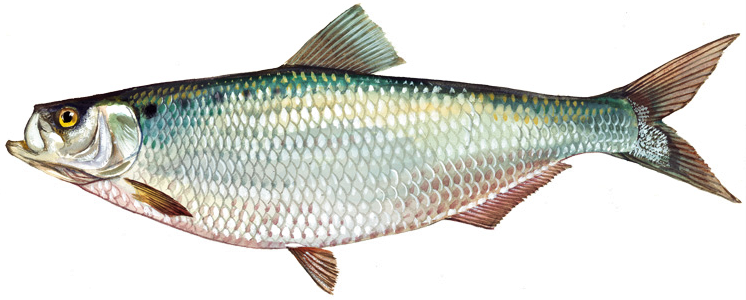
- Alosa mediocris (Mitchill, 1814) (hickory shad)
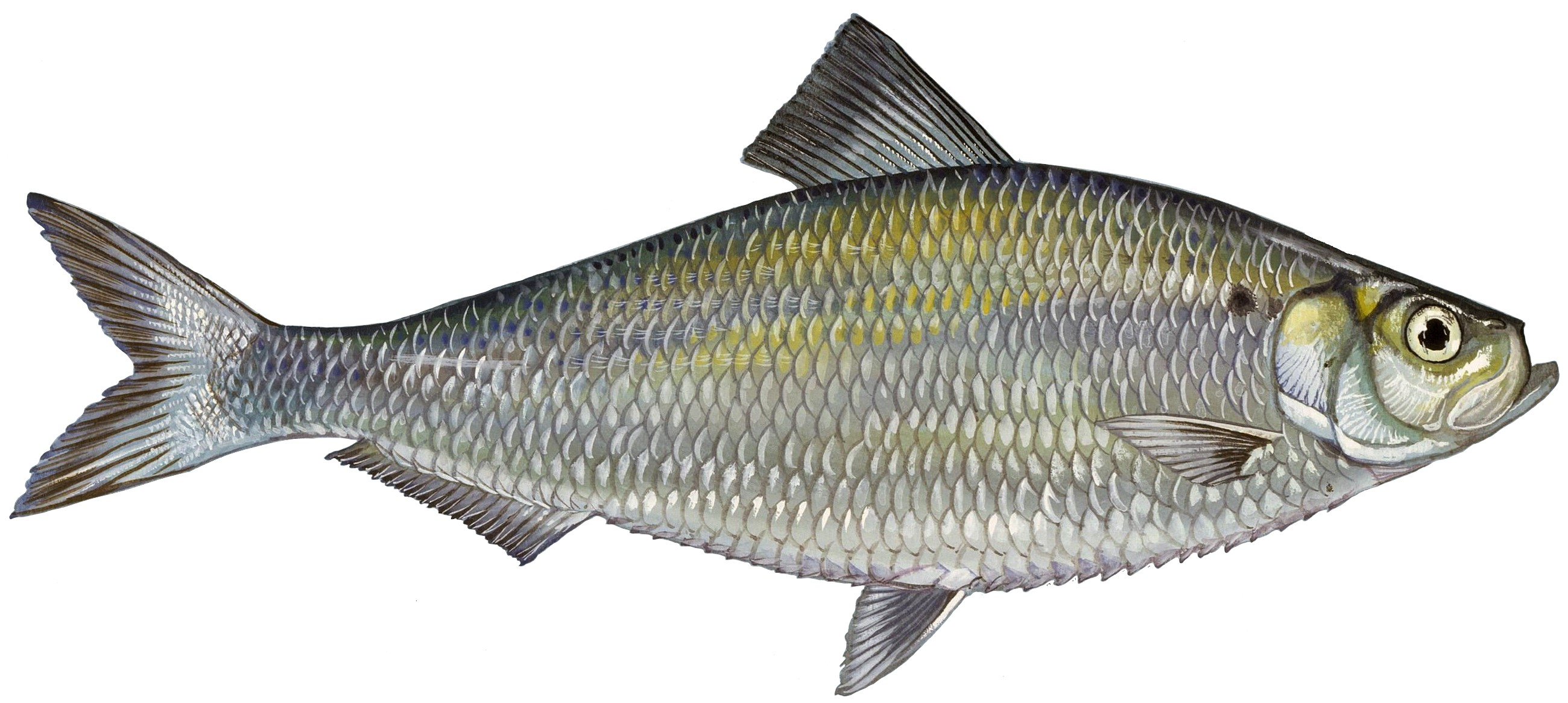
- Alosa pseudoharengus (A. Wilson, 1811) (alewife)
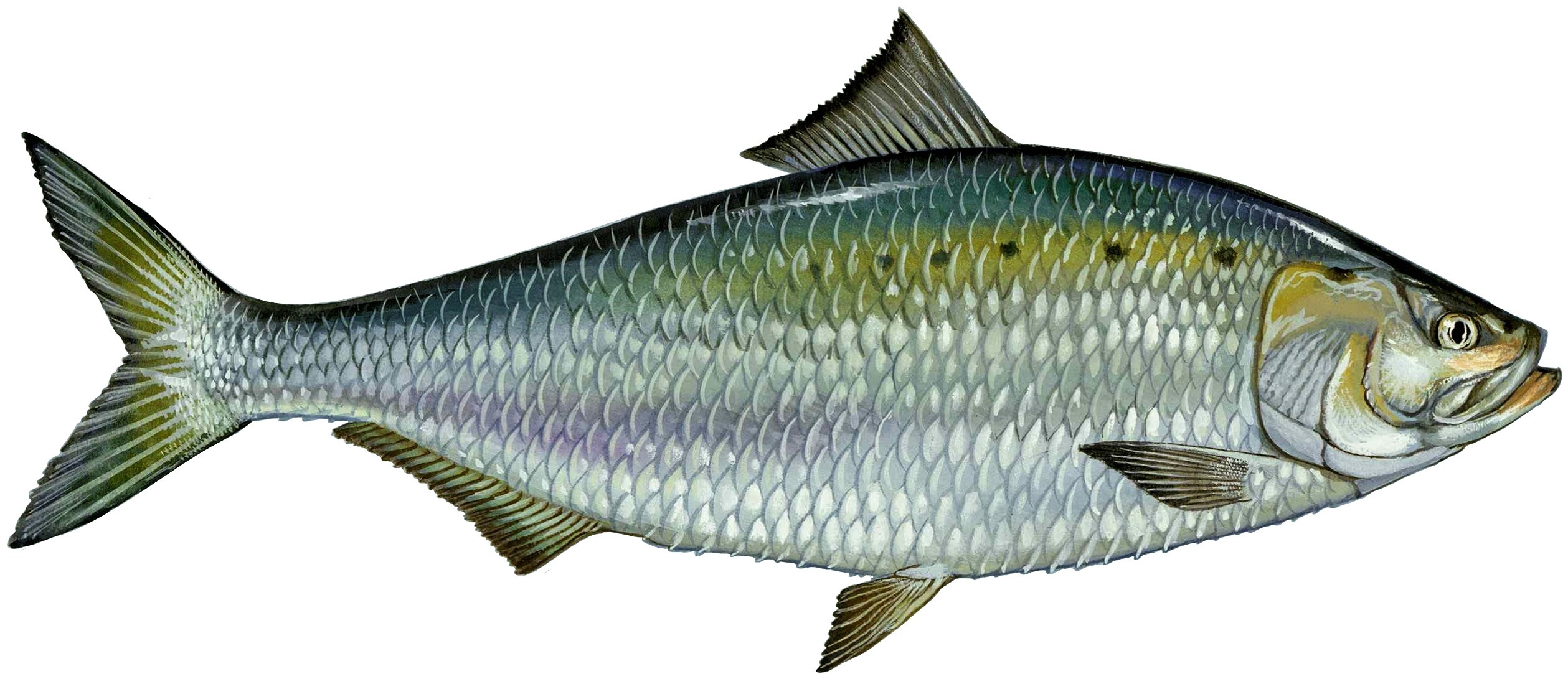
- Alosa sapidissima (A. Wilson, 1811) (American shad)

==== Western Europe and the Mediterranean ====
- Alosa agone (Scopoli, 1786) (agone)
- Alosa algeriensis Regan, 1916 (North African shad)
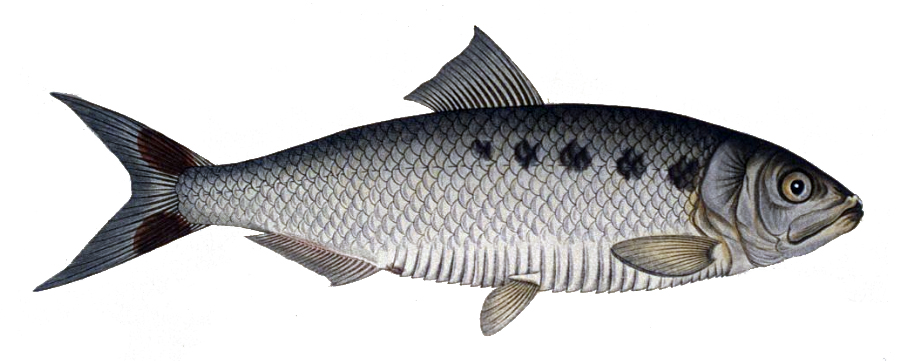
- Alosa alosa (Linnaeus, 1758) (allis shad)
- Alosa fallax (Lacépède, 1803) (twait shad)
- Alosa killarnensis Regan, 1916 (Killarney shad)

==== Caspian Sea, Black Sea, the Balkans ====
- Alosa braschnikowi (Borodin, 1904) (Caspian marine shad)
- Alosa caspia (Eichwald, 1838)
  - A. c. caspia (Eichwald, 1838) (Caspian shad)
  - A. c. knipowitschi (Iljin, 1927) (Enzeli shad)
  - A. c. persica (Iljin, 1927) (Astrabad shad)
- Alosa curensis (Suvorov, 1907) (Kura shad)
- Alosa immaculata E. T. Bennett, 1835 (Pontic shad)
- Alosa kessleri (Grimm, 1887) (Caspian anadromous shad)
- Alosa macedonica (Vinciguerra, 1921) (Macedonia shad)
- Alosa maeotica (Grimm, 1901) (Black Sea shad)
- Alosa saposchnikowii (Grimm, 1887) (Saposhnikovi shad)
- Alosa sphaerocephala (L. S. Berg, 1913) (Agrakhan shad)
- Alosa tanaica (Grimm, 1901) (Azov shad)
- Alosa vistonica Economidis and Sinis, 1986 (Thracian shad)
- Alosa volgensis (L. S. Berg, 1913) (Volga shad)

=== Fossil species ===
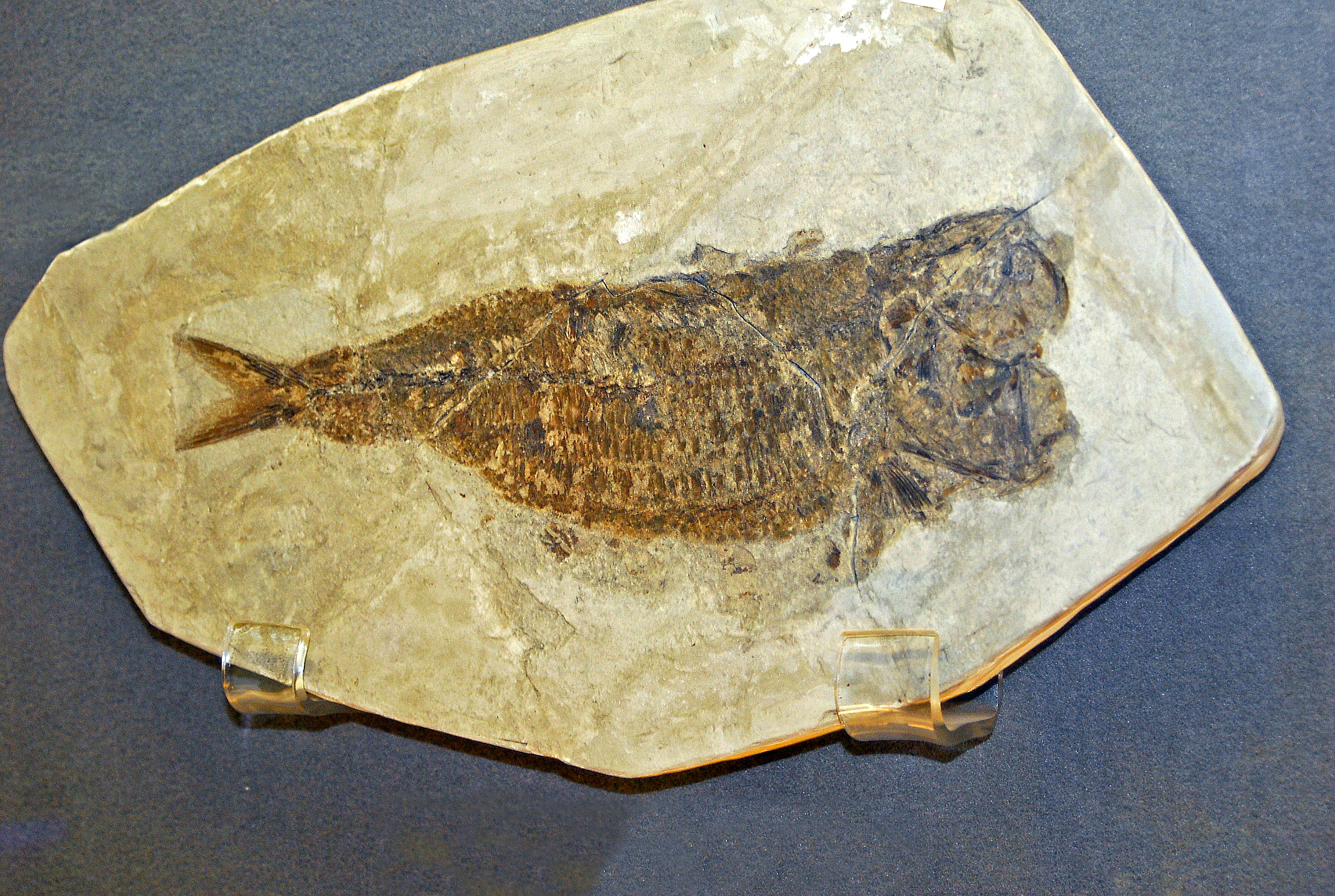
Fossil of Alosa elongata

The following fossil Alosa species are known. An especially high diversity of fossil Alosa species is known from a mid-late Miocene-aged deposit in Pınarhisar District, Turkey:

- †Alosa aralensis Chisara, 1977 - Oligocene of Russia
- †Alosa avcilarensis Rückert-Ülkümen, 1994 - Miocene of Turkey
- †Alosa baykali Rückert-Ulkümen, 1965 - Miocene of Turkey
- †Alosa elongata Agassiz, 1843 - Late Miocene of Italy, Greece and Algeria (=A. crassa Sauvage, 1873, A. numidica Sauvage, 1873, A. renoui Sauvage, 1873)
- †Alosa fortipinnata Rückert-Ulkümen, 1965 - Miocene of Turkey
- †?Alosa ganolytoides David, 1946 - mid-late Eocene of California [scale] (taxonomy uncertain)
- †Alosa genuina Daniltshenko, 1960 - Miocene of North Caucasus, Russia
- †Alosa latissima Heckel, 1853 - Oligocene of Italy, potentially Miocene of Turkey
- †Alosa paulicrenata Bratishko et al. 2015 - Middle Miocene of Kazakhstan [otolith]
- †Alosa pinarhisarensis Rückert-Ulkümen, 1965 - Miocene of Turkey
- †Alosa sagorensis (Steindachner, 1863) - Oligocene of Hungary & potentially Poland, Miocene of Turkey
- †Alosa sculptata (Weiler, 1920) - Miocene of Germany
- †Alosa spinosa (Rückert-Ulkümen, 1965) - Miocene of Turkey
- †Alosa weileri Rückert-Ulkümen, 1960 - Miocene of Turkey

The former fossil species A. ovalis Rückert-Ulkümen, 1965 is now placed in Clupeonella as Clupeonella ovalis. The taxonomy of some of these other fossil species is also uncertain; A. fortipinnata appears most closely related to Brevoortia, while A. crassa and A. sculptata cannot be reliably placed in the genus either. However, A. elongata appears to be a definitive member of the genus.

== Recreational fishing ==
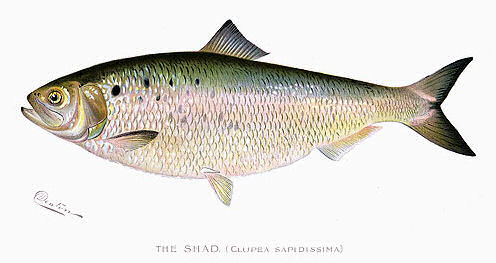
Watercolor of an American shad by Sherman F. Denton, 1904. The swelling between the anal fin and ventral fin identifies this as a pregnant female.

Shad is a type of fish, much valued as a sport fish. The male shad is an excellent game fish, showing multiple jumps and an occasional end-over-end; it has been called a "freshwater tarpon". The gravid female does not fight much, but is often kept for the roe.

American shad exhibit complex and little-understood feeding behavior while spawning. Unlike salmon, shad retain the ability to digest and assimilate food during the anadromous migration. Like other fish, their feeding instinct can be triggered by a variety of factors such as turbidity and water temperature.

== Commercial fishing ==
Commercial capture production of wild shad in tonnes.
1999	2000	2001	2002	2003	2004	2005	2008	2010	2011	2012	2013	2014
788,770	860,346	665,284	589,692	524,800	569,160	605,548	588,978	645,977	611,371	604,842	628,622	636,678

== Management ==
Shad populations have been in decline for years due to spawning areas blocked by dams, habitat destruction, pollution, and overfishing. Management of shad has called for more conservative regulations, and policies to help the species have lower fishing mortality.

== Political significance ==
Shad serve a peculiar symbolic role in Virginia state politics. On the year of every gubernatorial election, would-be candidates, lobbyists, campaign workers, and reporters gather in the town of Wakefield, Virginia, for shad planking. American shad served as the focal point of John McPhee's book The Founding Fish.

== Culinary use ==
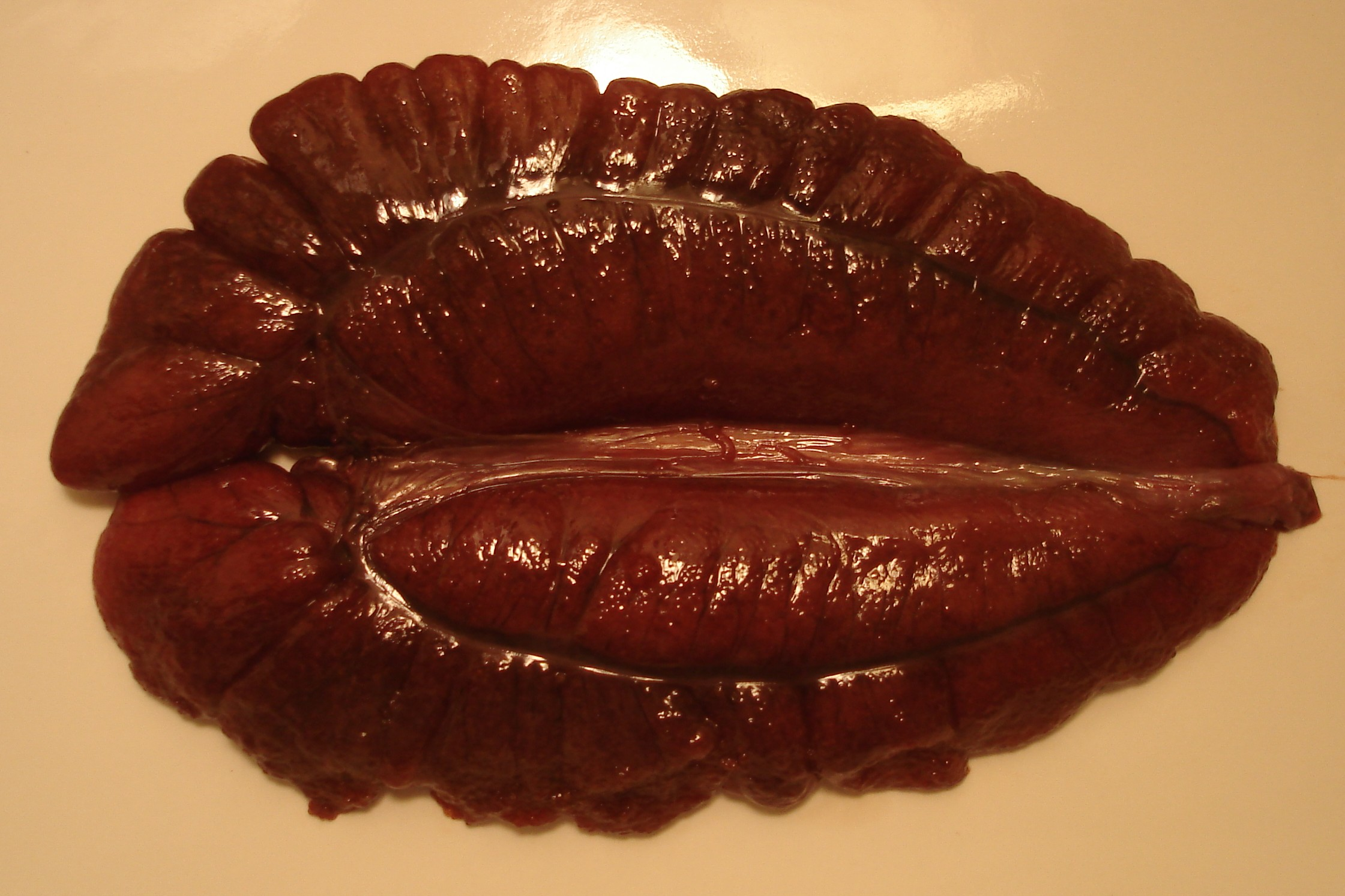
Shad roe

The American shad’s egg sacs, known as shad roe, are a seasonal springtime ingredient usually sautéed in butter and served with lemon and parsley. Due to their short availability and unique, rich texture, they are considered a specialty, commanding higher prices in early spring when the female fish migrate up rivers to spawn. These delicate, lobe-shaped, or ribbon-like, sets are typically cooked carefully to maintain their structure, resulting in a savory, mild flavor that is often paired with bacon or other rich ingredients.

== See also ==
- The Shad Foundation
