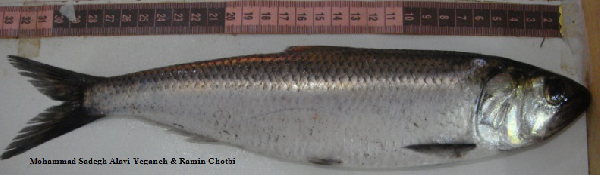

Conservation status
- Least Concern (IUCN 3.1)

Scientific classification
- Domain: Eukaryota
- Kingdom: Animalia
- Phylum: Chordata
- Class: Actinopterygii
- Order: Clupeiformes
- Family: Alosidae
- Genus: Alosa
- Species: A. kessleri

Binomial name
- Alosa kessleri (Grimm, 1887)

= Alosa kessleri =

Species of fish

Alosa kessleri, also referred to as the Caspian anadromous shad, the blackback, or the black-spined herring, is a species of alosid fish. It is one of the several species of shad endemic to the Caspian Sea basin.

This is an anadromous species which ascends from the Caspian to the Volga river up to the Volgograd to spawn. Before the construction of the Volgograd dam it migrated up to the Kama and Oka tributaries. Few fish enter the Terek and Ural Rivers.

While the migration upstream is broken, it seems the fish have found new breeding grounds south of the dam, and the population is now abundant. The species may be threatened by commercial and illegal fishing in the Caspian Sea and at the mouth of the Volga during the migration, though.

== See also ==
- Alosa volgensis
