= Brazhnikov =

Brazhnikov (masculine, Russian: Бражников) or Brazhnikova (feminine, Russian: Бражникова) is a Russian surname. Notable people with the surname include:

- Anna Brazhnikova (born 1991), Uzbek–born Swedish tennis player
- Vladimir Brazhnikov (1941–2011), Russian football coach

== See also ==
- Alosa braschnikowi (Brazhnikov's shad)
