= Liparia =

Liparia may refer to:

- Liparia, a common name for the fish species Alosa macedonica
- Liparia (plant), a genus of plants in the family Fabaceae
