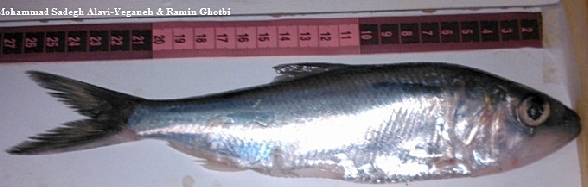
- Iran, Caspian Sea, Noor Beach, 2013, 26 cm

Scientific classification
- Domain: Eukaryota
- Kingdom: Animalia
- Phylum: Chordata
- Class: Actinopterygii
- Order: Clupeiformes
- Family: Alosidae
- Genus: Alosa
- Species: A. saposchnikowii

Binomial name
- Alosa saposchnikowii (Grimm, 1887)

= Alosa saposchnikowii =

Species of fish

Alosa saposchnikowii, or the saposhnikovi shad, is a species of fish in the clupeid genus Alosa. It is one of the endemic species of this genus in the Caspian Sea area.

The species conducts annual migrations within the Caspian sea, and as a cold-loving species is one of the first to migrate in spring to the north. It spawns in the northern Caspian in April–May, in shallow water where the salinity is low, almost zero. Nevertheless, it is not anadromous. The young later move southward, where salinities are about 12 ppt.
