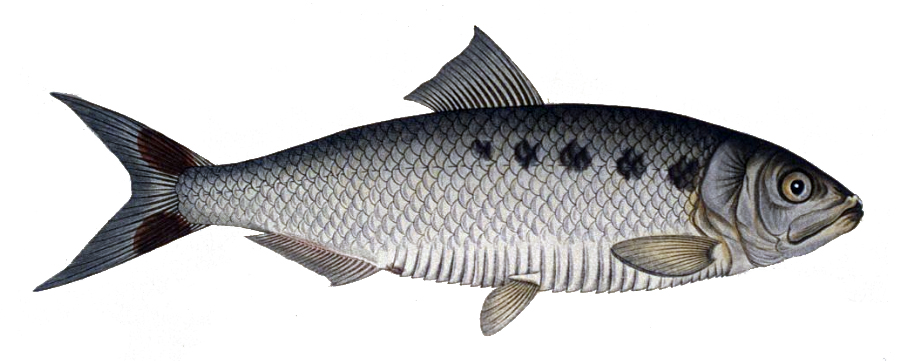

Conservation status
- Critically Endangered (IUCN 3.1)

Scientific classification
- Kingdom: Animalia
- Phylum: Chordata
- Class: Actinopterygii
- Division: Teleostei
- Order: Clupeiformes
- Family: Alosidae
- Genus: Alosa
- Species: A. alosa

Binomial name
- Alosa alosa (Linnaeus, 1758)

Synonyms
- Alausa vulgaris Valenciennes, 1847; Alosa communis Yarrell, 1836; Alosa cuvierii Malm, 1877; Alosa rusa Mauduyt, 1848; Clupea alosa Linnaeus, 1758

= Allis shad =

Species of fish

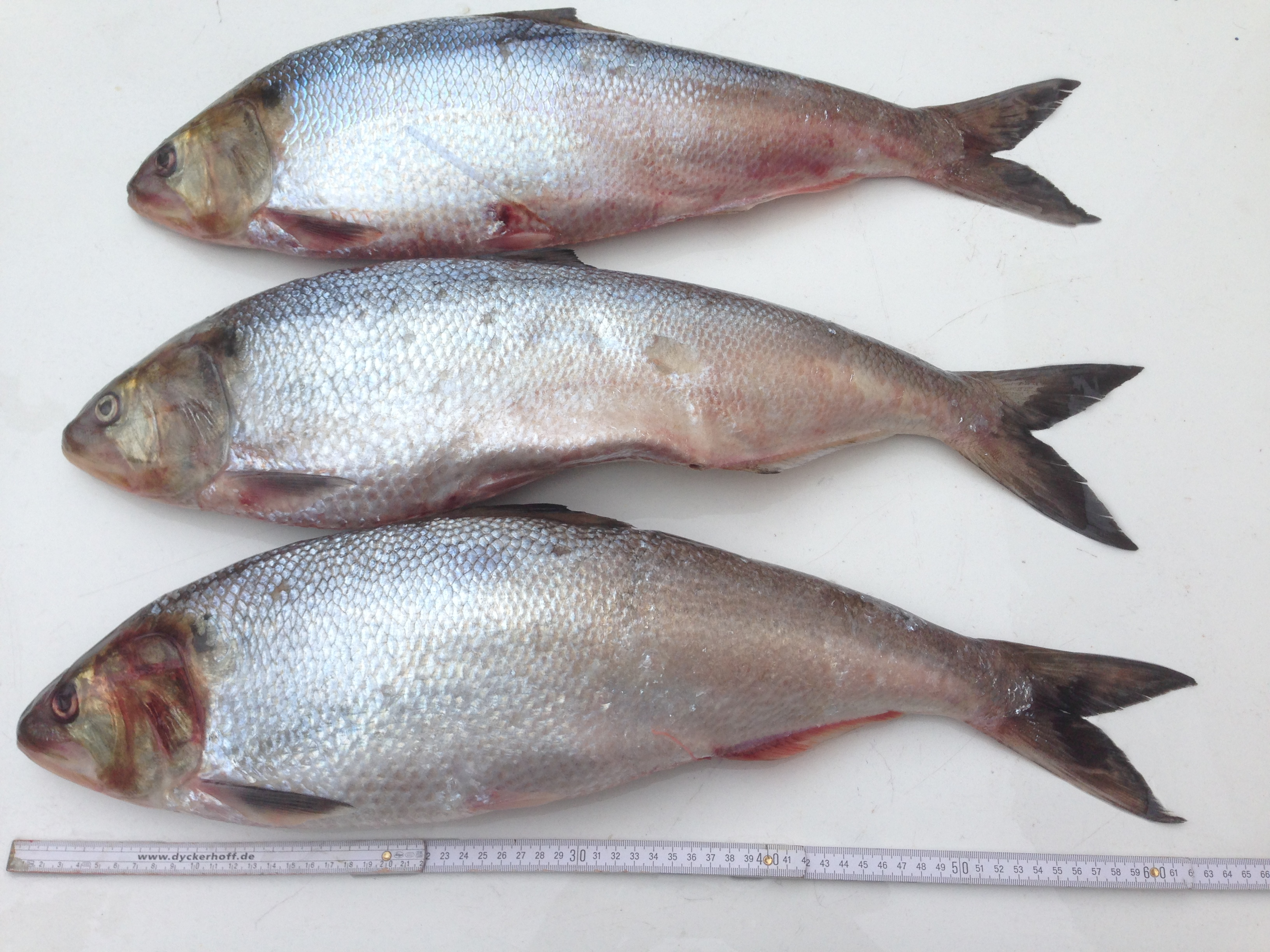
Allis shad

The allis shad (Alosa alosa) is a widespread Northeast Atlantic species of fish in the Alosidae family. It is an anadromous fish which migrates into fresh water to spawn. It is found in the eastern Atlantic Ocean, the western Baltic Sea and the western Mediterranean Sea. In appearance it resembles an Atlantic herring but has a distinctive dark spot behind the gill cover and sometimes a row of up to six spots behind this. It sometimes hybridises with the twait shad (A. fallax). This fish becomes mature when three or more years old and migrates to estuaries, later swimming up rivers to spawn. Populations of this fish have declined due to overfishing, pollution and habitat destruction. Conservation of this species is covered by Appendix III of the Bern Convention and Appendix II and V of the European Community Habitats Directive.

== Description ==
The allis shad is a typical herring-type fish. It has no lateral line and a somewhat rounded belly. The gill cover is ridged and the scales large. The back is a bluish-green colour and the head brownish with a golden tinge on the operculum. The flanks are silvery, sometimes with a bronzy tinge, and a distinctive large dark spot occurs just behind the gill cover, and occasionally one to six smaller spots behind that. The adult length is typically 30 to 60 cm (12 to 24 in).

== Distribution ==
The allis shad is found in the eastern Atlantic in waters bordering most of Europe and northwestern Africa, and it enters to the western Baltic and western Mediterranean Seas, but it is rare outside and increasingly within France. There are no longer breeding populations in Morocco or Mediterranean Spain.

== Biology and lifecycle ==
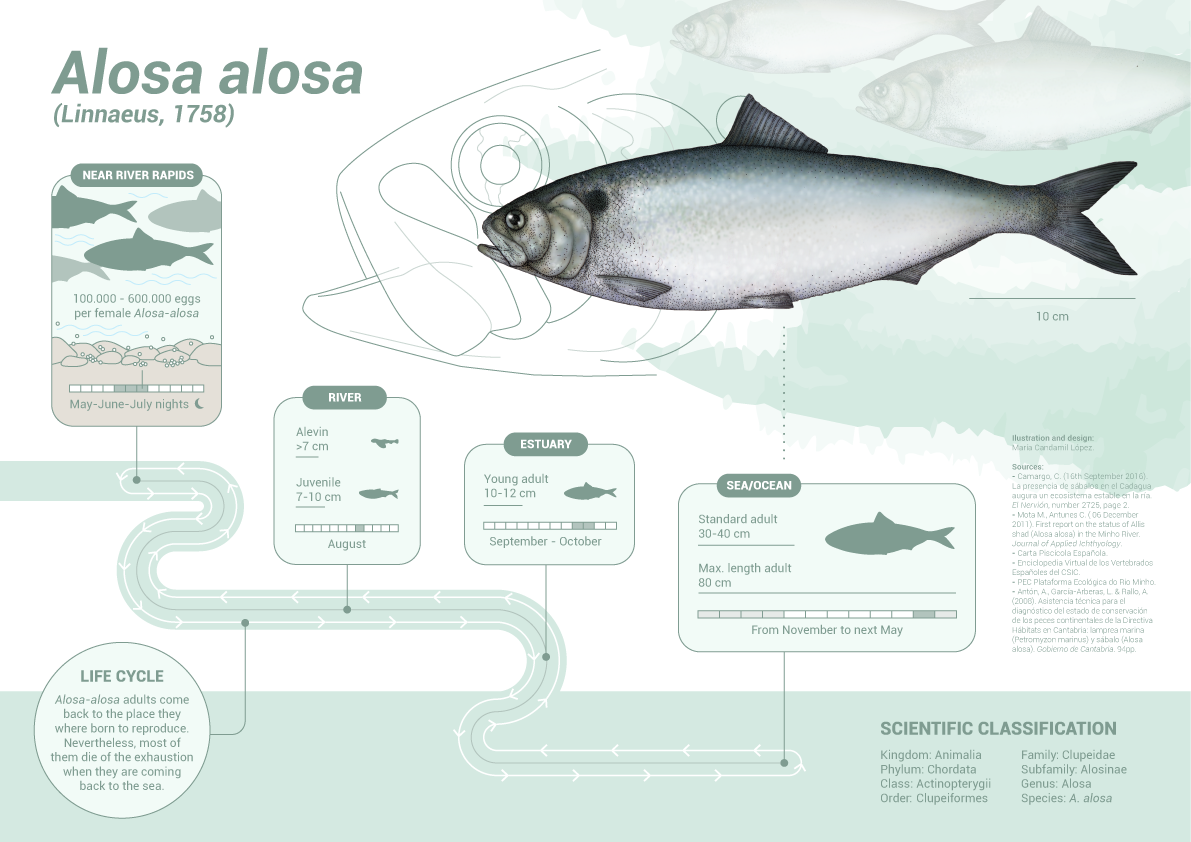
Biology and lifecycle of Alosa alosa

Alosa alosa has a similar lifecycle to that of the twait shad A. fallax. They are known to live in sympatry, and the two species can hybridize. They are anadromous species like many other species in the genus Alosa. However, some record of them being landlocked suggests an ability to adapt well to their environment. They primarily live at sea on feeding grounds and migrate to their spawning grounds between April and June once they are sexually mature. Maturity usually ranges from 3 to 7 years of age. A. alosa can usually only reproduce once in their lifetimes. Juveniles appear in estuaries and brackish water around July to August. The salinity of brackish water may pose problems to the juveniles migrating from fresh water.

The estuarine phase, or the time spent in estuaries migrating from spawning grounds to sea, is estimated to have a duration in A. alosa of up to six months. The estimate, however, does not take into account individual variation and/or survival of juveniles in the estuarine phase.

== Population reduction ==
Populations have been reduced primarily by overfishing, pollution, and habitat destruction. Siltation and gravel mining threaten spawning locations. There is concern that barriers to migration like dams are causing allis shad to spawn downstream from their usual locations, potentially prompting hybridization with twaite shad. Climate change may force the species' distribution to shift or contract further. The International Union for Conservation of Nature listed the species as critically endangered in 2024, citing an estimated global population decline of around 80% over the past 20 years, leaving many small relict subpopulations and extirpating others.

== Conservation ==
Four special areas of conservation have been designated in Ireland where Alosa species have been known to spawn. Alosa alosa "has been placed in Appendix III of the Bern Convention (1979) that lists protected fauna species as well as in Appendix II and V of the European Community Habitats Directive (1992) that list, respectively, species whose conservation requires the designation of special areas of conservation and that are subject to management measures." However, A. alosa is currently under a moratorium (2008) in numerous French watersheds.
