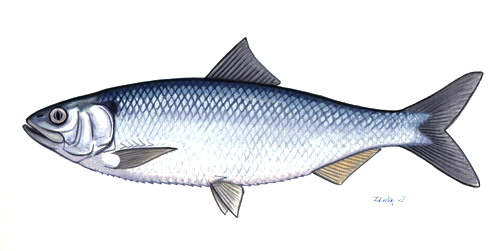

Conservation status
- Vulnerable (IUCN 3.1)

Scientific classification
- Kingdom: Animalia
- Phylum: Chordata
- Class: Actinopterygii
- Order: Clupeiformes
- Family: Alosidae
- Genus: Alosa
- Species: A. immaculata

Binomial name
- Alosa immaculata E. T. Bennett, 1835

Synonyms
- Alosa pontica (Eichwald, 1838)

= Pontic shad =

Species of fish

The Pontic shad (Alosa immaculata, previously Alosa pontica), also referred to as the Black Sea shad or Kerch shad, is a species of clupeid fish in the genus Alosa, native to the Black Sea and Sea of Azov basins.

== Distribution ==
Alosa immaculata lives in the Black Sea and Sea of Azov, and adults migrate up rivers to spawn. It may also be found in the Marmara Sea in Turkey. It currently migrates up and spawns in six rivers: the Danube, Dnieper, Dniester, Southern Bug, Don and Kuban Rivers. Previously the migrations reached far upstream, up to 1,600 in Danube and 900 km in Don, now dams are restricting the migrations. There is also a landlocked population in Don.

== Life cycle ==
Alosa immaculata are anadromous. Spawning occurs between the warmer months of May and August. It has a pelagic life and prefers to feed on small fishes and crustaceans.

== Conservation ==
Although the species used to migrate as far upstream as the Mohács (Hungary) in the Danube, the building of dams has limited the migrations. It is now regionally extinct in Hungary. Excessive fishing and pollution might also be responsible for their decline.
