= Alosa volgensis =

Conservation status
- Extinct (IUCN 3.1)

Scientific classification
- Kingdom: Animalia
- Phylum: Chordata
- Class: Actinopterygii
- Order: Clupeiformes
- Family: Alosidae
- Genus: Alosa
- Species: †A. volgensis

Binomial name
- †Alosa volgensis (L. S. Berg, 1913)

Synonyms
- Clupeonella caspia volgensis L. S. Berg, 1913

Species of fish

Alosa volgensis, the Volga shad, is an extinct species of alosid fish. It was endemic to the Caspian Sea region. It was officially listed as extinct by the International Union for Conservation of Nature in 2024.

It was an anadromous species, which ascended from the Caspian to the Volga river, up to the Volgograd dam, to spawn. The Terek and Ural Rivers were part of its natural range.
