= Shad fishing =

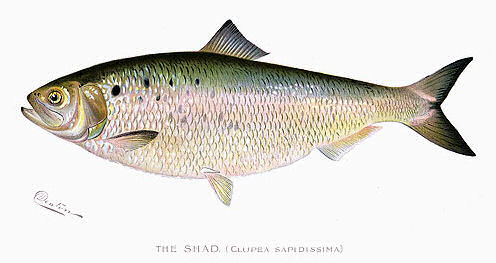
Watercolor of an American shad by Sherman F. Denton, 1904. The swelling between the anal fin and ventral fin identifies this as a pregnant female.

Shad is a type of fish, much valued as a sport fish. The male shad is an excellent game fish, showing multiple jumps and an occasional end-over-end; it has been called a "freshwater tarpon". The gravid female does not fight much, but is often kept for the roe.

American shad exhibit complex and little-understood feeding behavior while spawning. Unlike salmon, shad retain the ability to digest and assimilate food during the anadromous migration. Like other fish, their feeding instinct can be triggered by a variety of factors such as turbidity and water temperature.

== Fishing techniques ==
Anglers use both spinning and fly fishing tackle to pursue shad. Spin fisherman often use a shad dart or a flutter spoon.

Except in unusual conditions, shad stay fairly deep, requiring weight on the line or fly. Many fly fishermen use an unusual 1/64 oz. "micro-jig", that resembles a tiny casting bass jig, although it commonly has short nylon feathering to the rear. Shad can be taken either by slow trolling or drift casting, i.e. casting upriver and letting the lure drift with the current. Sometimes a live grub is threaded onto the dart. The shad stay near the bottom unless the water is unusually high, so the rig is designed to keep the lure a foot off the bed.

During the shad spawning run, multiple species of shad run together. Fishing regulations may vary between species. For example, in some locales, Hickory Shad may be kept while American Shad must be returned. The two species can be difficult to distinguish, so anglers must use caution when shad fishing to be able to make proper identification.

== Shad fishing in the U.S. ==
In the north of the US, April–June is when shad spawn in the coastal rivers and estuaries once water temperatures have reached 58 °F. Fishing conditions typically improve as water temperatures warm and flow decreases.

=== East Coast ===
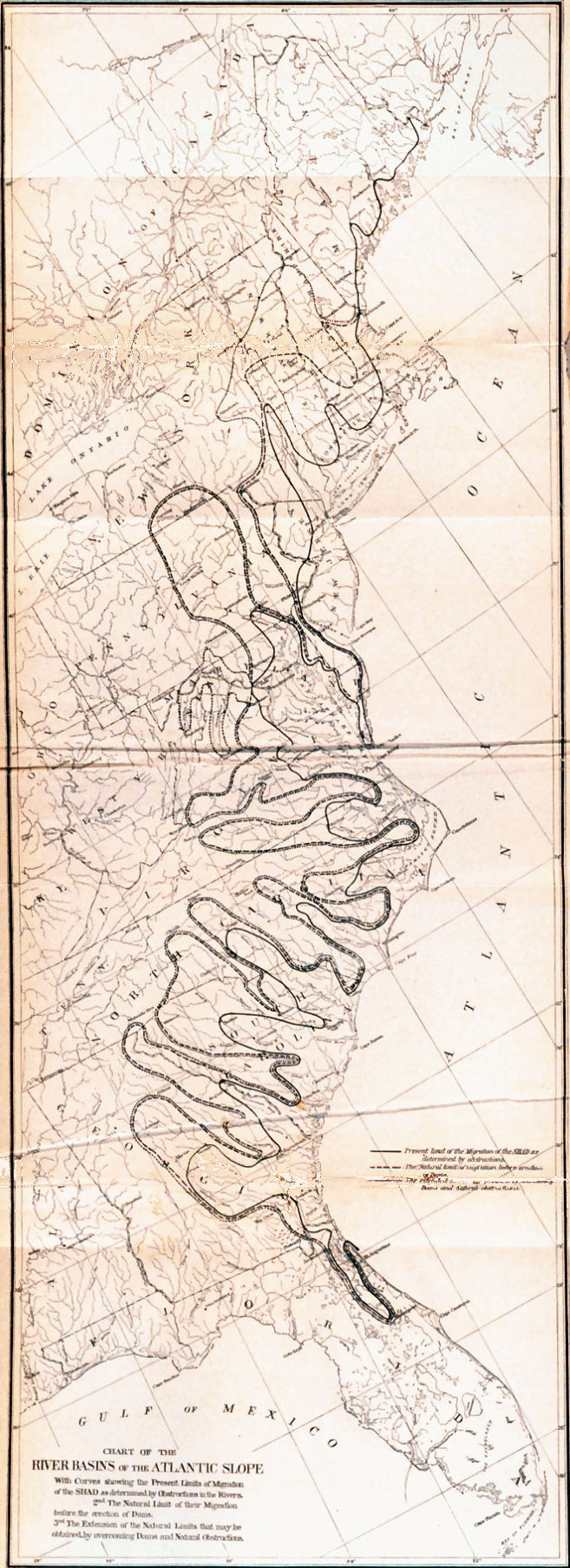
Old map of the east coast spawning grounds

- Connecticut: Unlike the Delaware, shad on the Connecticut River have to pass a number of dams, each one thinning the numbers that push farther upstream. The river is big to fish without a lead line and a boat, so waders have to look for confluences like that of the Farmington River near Windsor. The Hammonasset River around Clinton has some good fly water. In historic times (18-19th c.), a significant proportion of the protein consumed by European settlers in the Connecticut River Valley and surrounding hill towns was dried, smoked or salted shad, caught during the brief spawning run each spring.
- Florida: The St. Johns River meanders through swamps and savannas, a completely different shad river from the Delaware's stony rapids and draws. Some excellent fly water can be accessed from Route 46 between Sanford and Titusville. In times past, the St. Johns held an annual shad tournament in February, and an estimated 1,000 boats could be seen trolling the river north of Sanford. Today, there is a bag limit of 10.
- Georgia: Shad rivers include the Ogeechee, Woodbine River|Woodbine, Satilla, Altamaha and the Savannah River at Bluff Lock dams near Augusta.
- Maryland and Washington, D.C.: Hickory shad, smaller cousins to American shad, are found here. They have a predilection for small bait fish imitations. The Potomac is sufficiently narrow in places to afford shore fishing opportunities. Spinfishing has been the historical norm, but flyfishing has been very popular recently. American shad populations are recovering in the Potomac and Susquehanna rivers.
- Massachusetts and Vermont: Holyoke Dam — perhaps the state's most famous spot — is where the current world record was set in 1986. Some coastal rivers like the Palmer and the North have less crowded conditions. Shad go all the way up into Vermont as far as Bellows Falls, though the Vernon dam has significantly decreased the run by this point.
- New York, Pennsylvania and New Jersey: There is a shad run over 300 miles along the Delaware River. Most of the better wading fly water are above Port Jervis, New York.
- North Carolina and South Carolina: Try Cape Fear River at the Lock & Dam No.1 and the Tar River upstream of Rocky Mount railway bridge. The Cashie River is wadeable hickory shad territory. The most notable South Carolina runs occur in the Santee and Cooper Rivers. Bank and boat angling opportunities are available below St. Stephen Power House on the Santee Re-diversion canal. Boat, bank, and wade fishing opportunities occur below Lake Marion Dam.
- Virginia: The James River's tributaries offer a variety of opportunities, as do the York River tributaries like the Mattaponi south of Aylett and the Pamunkey.

=== West Coast ===
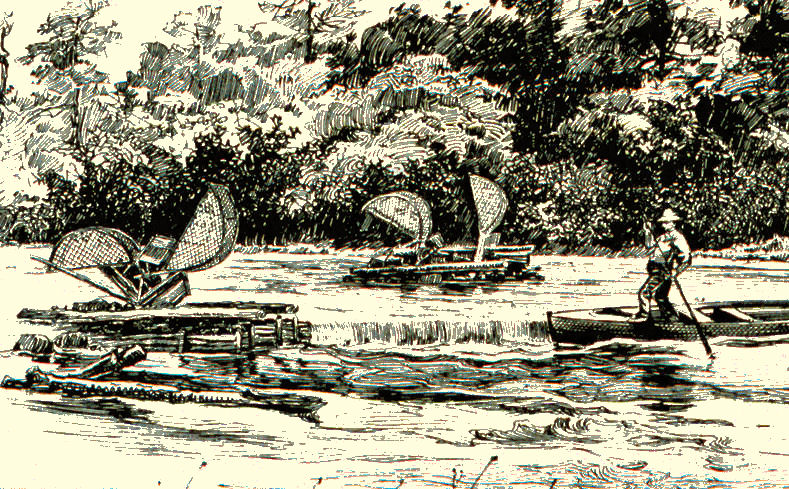
Early 19th-century shad fishing on the Peedee (Greater Pee Dee) River, South Carolina.

- California: The Sacramento River provides the best-known shad water in the state, and is ideally suited to spin fishing. The water is large, quite deep and is best accessed via boat. There are smaller, more accessible waters suitable for wading fly anglers along the Sacramento's' tributaries.
- Oregon: Most of Oregon's coastal rivers have shad runs, but there are some standouts including the Columbia, Umpqua, Siuslaw, and Willamette. East of Portland, the Bonneville Dam poses a significant obstacle to the Columbia River's shad run. As a result, the most popular areas are just downstream from the dam, though shore fishing can be dicey depending on water levels.
- Washington: The Columbia River delineates the border with Oregon, so some of Washington's best shad fishing is to be had in the Bonneville Dam area. There is a small non-Indian commercial gill net fishery several miles downstream from Bonneville Dam. There is also a tribal commercial fishery. The tribal fishery is composed of a dip net/hoop net fishery from platforms primarily in the Bonneville Dam pool and a live trap fishery at The Dalles Dam.

== Shad fishing in Ireland ==
There are 2 species of shad commonly encountered by anglers in Ireland. Twaite shad and Allis shad run a small number of river in the south east of the country. These include the Munster Blackwater, the Rivers Barrow, Nore and Suir and the River Slaney. Chief amongst these is the River Barrow where anglers gather every May to fish the main runs of Twaite Shad.
