= The Shad Foundation =

- Founded: 1996
- Type: non-profit

The Shad Foundation is an international non-profit 501(c)(3) organization established in 1996 for the study, protection, and celebration of shads around the world. Currently, there are more than 30 recognized shad species worldwide. Shad, which are members of the herring family, are widely distributed, and many are anadromous, meaning that they migrate from fresh to salt water as juveniles and return to freshwater for the express purpose of spawning. Many species are threatened by water pollution, overfishing, habitat destruction, and obstacles to migration, such as dams.

== How it started ==
In the summer of 1995, Rich Hinrichsen and Curtis Ebbesmeyer peered into a fish ladder through an algae-stained window, hoping to witness a great biologic event: the return of the Columbia River's Pacific salmon. The fish ladders at Bonneville Dam were in fact filled with silver migrants, but oddly, few salmon could be counted among them. Another fish—once foreign to the Columbia—accounted for the great silvery flood: the American shad. American Shad made their way to the Columbia after 1871 when Seth Green planted some fry in the Sacramento River, California. By 1938, when Bonneville Dam was completed and counts at the fishways were first tallied, only 5,000 were counted. Over the next half century the American shad adult count at Bonneville Dam sometimes exceeded 3 million., While fish managers on the Atlantic Coast of the United States struggled to save American shad runs, American shad remain depleted. But American shad on the Pacific Coast of the United States thrive greatly. Spurred on by curiosity and the discovery that there were 30+ recognized shad species world-wide Hinrichsen and Ebbesmeyer, launched the Shad Foundation.

== Shad Journal ==
The Shad Foundation began by publishing the Shad Journal in 1996, which included articles on several of the shad species worldwide. The journal publishes letters, commentaries, histories, scientific articles, interviews, reviews, and philosophical and methodological items related to shad the world over. Back issues of the Shad Journal are freely available in electronic form. Today, the Shad Journal has been largely replaced by an e-mail discussion group.

Shad Journal Articles
Title	Author	Year	Volume(Issue)	Pages
Why A Shad Foundation?	Rich Hinrichsen	1996	1(1)	1
Riders on the Storm	Mizanur Rahman	1996	1(1)	2–3
An Interview With Fred Lewis	Rich Hinrichsen	1996	1(1)	4–9
The Lewis Shad Fishery and Community Culture	Charlie Groth	1996	1(1)	10
A World Shad Conference Proposal	Karin E Limburg	1997	2(1)	2
Oceanography of the Pacific Shad Invasion	Curt Ebbesmeyer and Rich Hinrichsen	1997	2(1)	4–8
One Night With Shad	Nick Richman and Karna Sandler	1997	2(1)	9
The Shad Project	Michael Robinson and Trevor Swett	1997	2(1)	10
A Resource at Risk: Saving China's Reeves Shad	Wang Hanping and Richard St. Pierre	1997	2(2)	4–8
Uppie, Downie: Commercial Shad Fishing On the Hudson	Mark Harmon	1997	2(3)	4–8
Managing Hudson River American Shad	Kathryn A. Hattalla	1997	2(3)	9–11
Who's Who: Stock Identification of Hudson River Shad and Other East Coast Populations	John Waldman	1997	2(3)	12–13
Juvenile Alosids: Ecological Movers and Shakers?	Karin E Limburg	1997	2(3)	14–15
Shad Fishing on the Hudson Half a Century Ago	Richard Joseph	1997	2(3)	16–19
New Shad Museum In Connecticut	Joe Zaientz	1997	2(4)	2–3
Shad in Iranian Waters	Brian Coad	1997	2(4)	4–8
Behavior of Migratory Fish Passing a Lock On the River Rhône, France	Jean Guillard and Benjamin Colon	1998	3(1)	4–5
Hisa Shad: Fish For the Teaming Millions	A. K. Yousuf Haroon	1998	3(1)	7–10
Salmon and Shad: A Tale of Two Fish	Rich Hinrichsen and Curt Ebbesmeyer	1998	3(2)	2–7
Breaking the Genetic Code	Kathleen Nolan	1998	3(3)	3–5
Connecticut River Shad Report	Joe Zaientz	1998	3(3)	6–7
Pontic Shad: A Short Review of the Species and Its Fishery	Ion Nãvodaru	1998	3(4)	3–5
Italy Pays Homage to the Ombrone River Shad	Marco Sammicheli	1998	3(4)	6–7
One Fish, Two Fish: Community volunteers count Alewives in New England's Parker River	Robert D. Stevenson, David C. Mountain, and Becka C. Roolf	1999	4(1)	3–7
Shad of the Shatt Al-Arab River in Iraq	Laith A.J. Al-Hassan	1999	4(2)	1–4
The Valley Forge Fish Story	Joseph Lee Boyle	1999	4(2)	4–10

== Shad Meetings ==
=== 2012 Paradox of the Dammed American Shad Workshop ===
On 8–9 June 2012, American shad researchers from both the Pacific and Atlantic coasts of the United States met along the Connecticut River at the S.O. Conte Anadromous Fish Laboratory in Turner's Falls, Massachusetts, for "Paradox of the Dammed -An American shad Workshop." The goal of the workshop was to try to understand a paradox; namely, why do American shad persist in the presence of dams in Pacific coastal watersheds while dams are considered responsible for American Shad population declines in their native range? Furthermore, as an introduced species, American shad are largely ignored on the west coast, while prized in their east coast watersheds. The workshop highlighted American shad decline and restoration efforts along the east coast, and how restoration efforts might benefit from information from shad research in the species' introduced range. The workshop identified gaps in knowledge of American shad biology, and identified research questions aimed at restoration of American Shad. The workshop was sponsored by the Diadromous Species Restoration Research Network, a research coordination network funded by the National Science Foundation. A 2013 article on the role of impoundments, temperature, and discharge on the colonization of the Columbia River Basin, USA, by nonindigenous American Shad benefitted from collaborations fostered at this workshop.

=== 2011 American Fisheries Society West Coast American Shad Symposium ===
A symposium was held 6 September 2011 at the American Fisheries Society Annual Meeting in Seattle, Washington, USA, to share new information on the distribution, status, and trends in abundance, etc. of introduced American shad in Pacific coastal ecosystems. The symposium began with an overview of American shad in its non-native range. The remaining presentations focused on the Columbia River population and covered spawning migrations, the effects of increased water temperature, decreased flow, and dam construction on upstream distribution and abundance, American Shad migration timing and distribution in the Columbia River estuary, verification of a `freshwater-type' life history variant of juveniles and the effects of American shad on parasite and disease dynamics in Oregon waters. The Pacific coast of the United States has been subjected to non-native fish introductions since the 1800s. The relative impacts of these introductions on Pacific coastal ecosystems remain largely unknown. Some non-native fishes have increased their range and proliferated. For example, American shad in the Columbia River have become more numerous than all Pacific salmon species (both hatchery- and wild-origin) combined. Despite their appearance on the Pacific coast for well over a century, non-native American shad remain largely overlooked. Whether or not the introduction of American Shad has had a negative impact, positive influence or benign effect on Pacific coastal ecosystems is unknown.

=== 2001 Shad Conference ===
In 2001, a conference on the status of shads worldwide was held in Baltimore, Maryland, USA. The purpose of the conference was five-fold: (1) to bring up to date the systematics of the group (2) to describe the status of individual species; (3) to synthesize global trends in shad populations; (4) to develop recommendations for management strategies, and (5) to form a network of collaborators, in research and management.

=== 2000 First International Conference on European Shads ===
A conference was held 23–26 May 2000, at the Centre Condorcet of Pessac, in the urban community of Bordeaux, France. The aim of this conference was to synthesize the biological knowledge in shad populations (genus Alosa sp.) present in the East Atlantic Ocean, the Mediterranean, the Black and Caspian seas.
