= Alosa curensis =

Conservation status
- Data Deficient (IUCN 3.1)

Scientific classification
- Kingdom: Animalia
- Phylum: Chordata
- Class: Actinopterygii
- Order: Clupeiformes
- Family: Alosidae
- Genus: Alosa
- Species: A. curensis

Binomial name
- Alosa curensis (Suvorov, 1907)

Synonyms
- Clupea curensis Suvorov, 1907; Caspialosa caspia curensis (Suvorov, 1907)

Species of fish

Alosa curensis, the Kura shad, is one of the species of alosid fish endemic to the Caspian Sea basin. It is found in the southwestern part of the brackish sea-lake, near the mouth of the Kura River, Azerbaijan. But generally this is a poorly known species.
