= Sanalosa =

Sanalosa Temporal range: Early Oligocene

Scientific classification
- Kingdom: Animalia
- Phylum: Chordata
- Class: Actinopterygii
- Division: Teleostei
- Order: Clupeiformes
- Family: Alosidae
- Genus: †Sanalosa
- Species: †S. janulosa

Binomial name
- †Sanalosa janulosa Bienkowska-Wasiluk et al., 2024

Extinct genus of fishes

Sanalosa is an extinct genus of alosid that inhabited Poland during the Rupelian stage. It contains the species S. janulosa.
