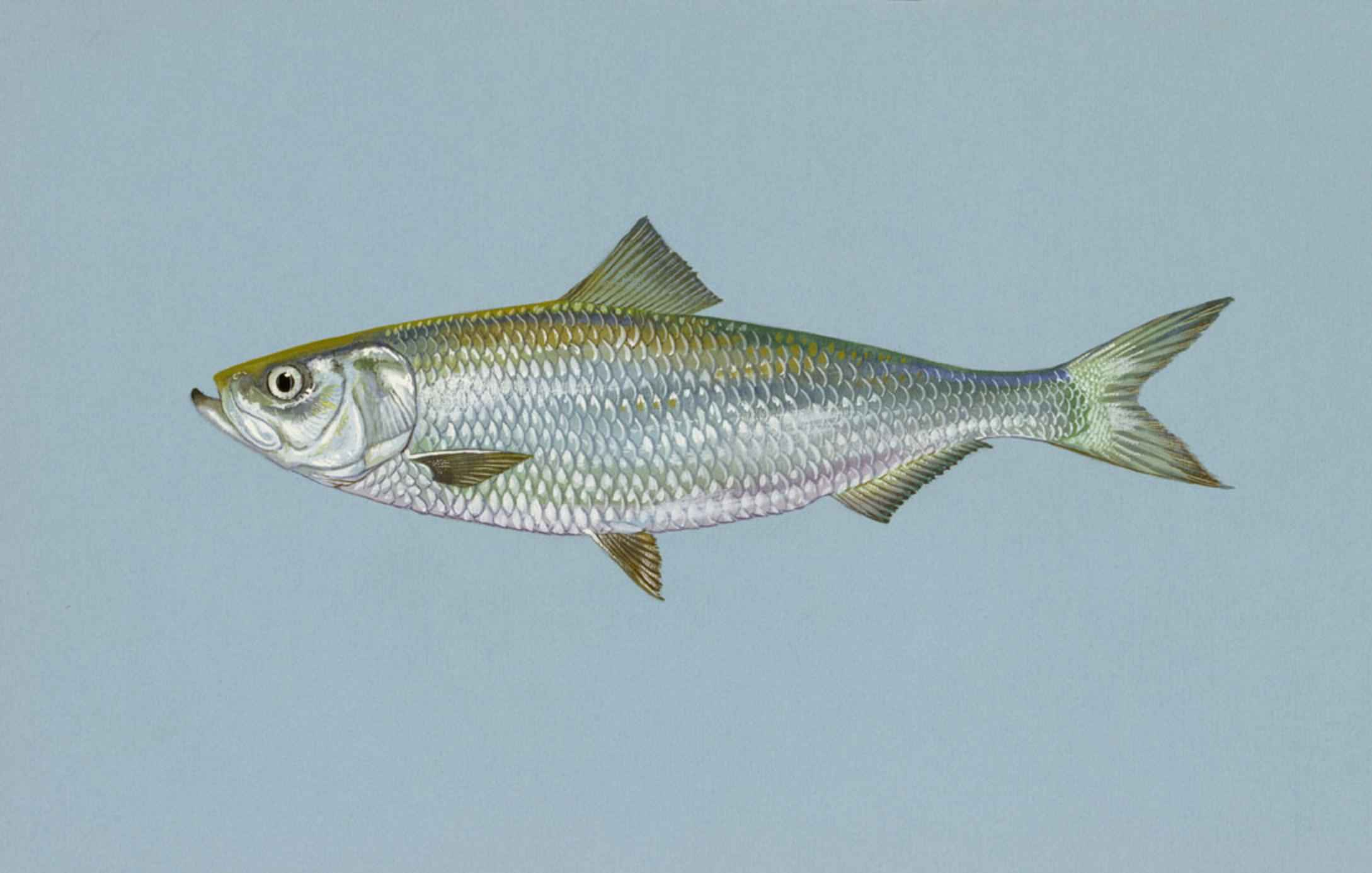

Conservation status
- Least Concern (IUCN 3.1)

Scientific classification
- Kingdom: Animalia
- Phylum: Chordata
- Class: Actinopterygii
- Order: Clupeiformes
- Family: Alosidae
- Genus: Alosa
- Subgenus: Pomolobus
- Species: A. chrysochloris

Binomial name
- Alosa chrysochloris (Rafinesque, 1820)

Synonyms
- Pomolobus chrysochloris Rafinesque, 1820

= Skipjack shad =

Skipjack herring

Species of fish

The skipjack herring (Alosa chrysochloris) is a North American, migratory, fresh and brackish water fish species in the herring family Alosidae. The name skipjack shad comes from the fact that it is commonly seen leaping out of the water while feeding. Other common names include blue herring, golden shad, river shad, Tennessee tarpon, and McKinley shad. The skipjack shad is restricted to the Gulf of Mexico drainage basins. Skipjack are found in clear to moderately turbid water in areas with flow. Because they are a migratory species, dams often impede their reproduction. Records suggest that this species was much more abundant in the Upper Mississippi River basin before it was impounded. Currently, skipjack is most abundant in the upper Mississippi River below the mouth of the Ohio River. They are known as an "early-run" species, as they migrate to spawn in the early spring.

== Distribution ==
Currently skipjack herring are restricted to the Gulf of Mexico and its drainage, in the United States. The Gulf of Mexico drainage includes the Mobile River basin, the ACF basin (Apalachicola/Chattahoochee/Flint River), the Mississippi basin, and the Rio Grande basin. Records indicate that this species was more abundant in the upper Mississippi River before it was impounded, and currently skipjack herring are most abundant in the upper Mississippi River below the mouth of the Ohio River. In recent years, human modifications to the middle Missouri River have made conditions more favorable for skipjack shad and their distribution has expanded upstream to the Nebraska-South Dakota border. Skipjack herring were historically found in the northern upper Mississippi River and the St. Croix River; however, there have only been four records of skipjack shad in Wisconsin waters since the 1950s. Because this fish is a migratory species, dams have diminished its distribution. It cannot continue to migrate northward over dams; therefore it is rare to see a skipjack in the upper reaches of the Gulf of Mexico drainages.

== Ecology ==
Skipjack herring are a migratory schooling species. They are a euryhaline species that can enter brackish and freshwater bodies. They can be anadromous but are not obligated to be because they can complete their life cycle in freshwater. Skipjack shad are strongly migratory within rivers and prefer fast flowing water where they are renowned for leaping. They are found in clear to moderately turbid waters in large rivers and reservoirs usually within the current over sand or gravel. In one study, skipjack herring have been found to feed on other shad/herring species such as the threadfin shad, the gizzard shad and young of the year herring species. In some extreme cases, it was shown that they could rely on cannibalism to survive. They are also known to feed on small fishes, mostly shad, while the juveniles feed on insects. The maximum size of the shad/herring utilized by skipjack shad was found to be about 30–35% of the skipjack's body length. There is not much data on the predators of the skipjack shad. Larger fish species, seabirds, and humans prey upon them. In fact, it is shown that fish species in the family Clupeidae including the skipjack herring comprise up to 45% of the diet of these avian species.

== Life history ==
The spawning season for skipjack herring is from early March to late April in the southern extent of its range. In the upper Mississippi river drainage spawning time is from early May to early July. Females produce about 100,000 to 300,000 eggs per year, presumably after 2 to 3 years of growth with an average size being 11.8 inches (30 cm) Spawning is thought to occur in the depths of main channel over coarse sand-gravel bars. Spawning temperature range is between 16 and 21 °C (61 and 70 °F). Eggs are broadcast over the substrate. Skipjack shad young may reach total lengths of 75–150 millimetres (3.0–5.9 in) during their first year. The maximum length in adults is 20 inches, but they are most commonly found to be between 12 and 18 inches (300–460 mm). The oldest specimen of skipjack herring reported was four years old. High population rates and the fact that there it has little to no interest to fisheries tells us that humans do not have much influence on life history. Impoundments have changed their distribution slightly, but they have no trouble spawning as a result.

== Management ==
Human impacts on skipjack herring populations seem to be minimal in the southern parts of their distribution. Dams have limited the natural distribution of the species. Skipjacks are no longer found in high numbers in the northern reaches of their distribution because of their inability to migrate over large impoundments. The Minnesota Department of Natural Resources (DNR) webpage tells us that "Further research into the species' life history and ecological requirements is needed. It is known that lock and dam structures hinder migration of skipjack herring during the early spring. If the skipjack herring is to be reestablished in Minnesota and Wisconsin, where they are nearly extirpated, fish passage features such as ladders or lifts will be required on Mississippi River lock and dams." In Minnesota, the construction of a fish passage facility is being considered at U.S. Lock and Dam 3 near Red Wing and could help skipjack herring migration in the Mississippi River drainage. The Minnesota DNR Division of Ecological Services received a State Wildlife Grant to conduct surveys for rare fish species in the Mississippi River from the Twin Cities to the Iowa border. These surveys were conducted from 2006 to 2008, and while the skipjack shad was a targeted species, none were found. In addition to the extirpation of the skipjack herring from Minnesota and Wisconsin, the ebony shell (Fusconaia ebena) and elephant ear (Elliptio crassidens), both state endangered mussels for which the skipjack is the sole host during their larval stages, are threatened to be extirpated as well.

In order to keep their distribution from shrinking further, humans need to decrease the number of dams that are constructed, or construct dams that skipjack shads are able to migrate through. In addition to hindering their migration, dams reduce flow. Skipjacks prefer areas with fast flowing water. In addition, it is necessary to keep turbidity and siltation levels down, as this species will only live in waters that are clear to moderately turbid. Sampling of skipjack has been performed through the use of gillnetting and electro fishing. These methods are best utilized beneath impoundments over sand or gravel substrates around spawning time each spring, where they are most abundant. Sampling should be done across the entire native range to document its abundance in different locations and human induced changes. For now, skipjack have a stable abundance in the southern part of its distribution, and need more management plans put into place in the northernmost reaches of its distribution.

== Systematics ==
While the skipjack shad has been attributed to the subgenus Potomolobius of the genus Alosa along with other North American shad species, it has been found to be phylogenetically the most basal of the Alosa species, which are also found in Europe and Western Asia.
