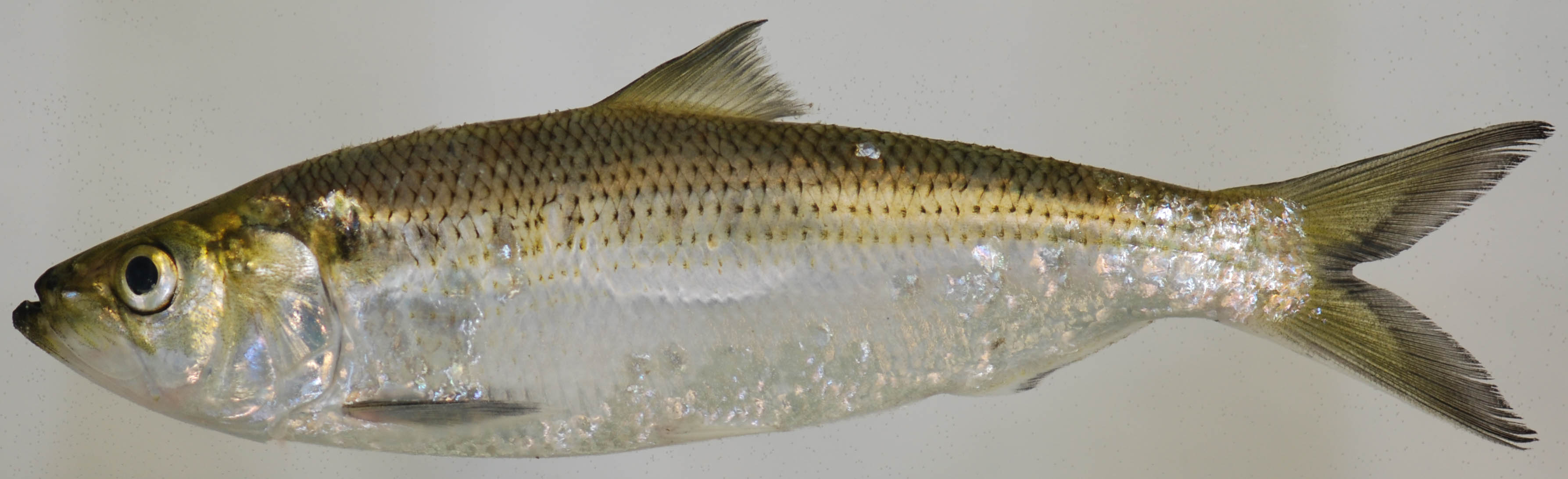

Conservation status
- Least Concern (IUCN 3.1)

Scientific classification
- Kingdom: Animalia
- Phylum: Chordata
- Class: Actinopterygii
- Division: Teleostei
- Order: Clupeiformes
- Family: Alosidae
- Genus: Alosa
- Species: A. mediocris

Binomial name
- Alosa mediocris (Mitchill, 1814)

Synonyms
- Clupea mediocris (Mitchill, 1814); Pomolobus mediocris (Mitchill, 1814); Clupea mattowaca (Mitchill, 1815); Clupea viridescens (DeKay, 1842)

= Hickory shad =

Alosa mediocris

Species of fish

The hickory shad (Alosa mediocris), fall herring, mattowacca, (Note: Also matowacca or mattowaca, from an unknown, but possibly southeastern Algonquian language) freshwater taylor or bonejack is a member of the family Alosidae, ranging along the East Coast of the United States from Florida to the Gulf of Maine. It is an anadromous fish species, meaning that it spawns in freshwater portions of rivers, but spends most of its life at sea. It is subject to fishing, both historic and current, but it is often confused with or simply grouped together with American shad (A. sapidissima) in catch statistics.

== Description ==
Hickory shad are elongate, laterally compressed fish with a tapering cross section. The scales on the belly are serrated. The fish is green-gray on its upper surface, becoming iridescent silver on the sides and white below. The scales bear small dark markings. A humeral spot is present and is frequently followed by a short series of fainter spots. The hickory shad can be distinguished from American shad by its lower jaw, which will project beyond the snout in the hickory shad.

== Distribution, habitat, and life history ==
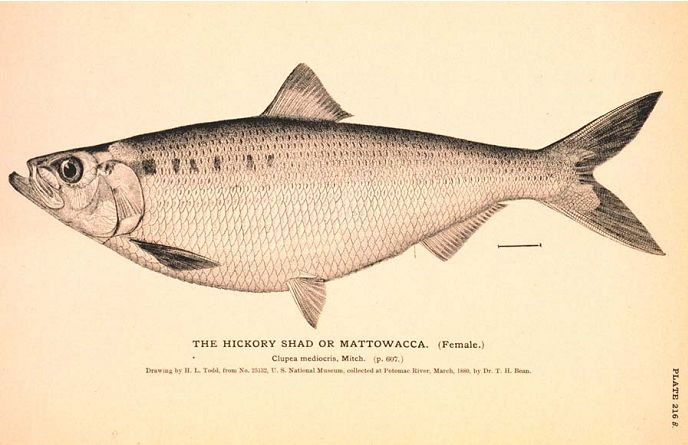
A female hickory shad

Hickory shad range from northern Florida to the Gulf of Maine. The largest populations occur in Chesapeake Bay and coastal North Carolina. It is a schooling anadromous species that inhabits marine waters, probably never far from land. Adults enter estuaries and freshwater tributaries from the St. John's River, Florida, to the Patuxent River, Maryland, to spawn during the spring. Their oceanic movements are poorly documented.

Spawning occurs from December to June, earliest in Florida and later with increasing latitude. The slightly adhesive and demersal eggs, about 1 mm in diameter, appear to be dispersed at random over gravel bars in moderate current. After water hardening, the eggs become semibuoyant and develop as they drift along the bottom. Fecundity ranges from 43,000 – 475,000 eggs per female, and although the developmental stages of eggs, larvae, and juveniles have been described, little is known concerning the distribution, ecology, and growth rates of these early life stages.

Hickory shad live to seven years. Both sexes mature starting at 2 years of age and can repeat spawn. Females are larger than males; in Florida, the average female is 37 centimetres (15 in) fork length and the average male is 34 centimetres (13 in) fork length.

Hickory shad are piscivorous, feeding primarily on small fishes, although crustaceans and squid contribute to their diet. One study from Florida showed that their diet on the spawning grounds was almost exclusively fish (97% by weight), but feeding is limited during the freshwater migration and mesenteric fat reserves developed prior to migration are metabolized en route.

== Relationship with humans ==
=== Recreational fishery ===
Hickory shad have a relatively low commercial value, but an increasingly popular recreational fishery exists throughout the mid-Atlantic states. By the late 1980s and early 1990s, hickory shad articles appeared in sport-fishing magazines. Headlines such as "the tough fighting hickory shad swarm near the rock-studded fall line…" and "feast on Rappahannock River hickory shad action" brought attention to the fishery. Subsequently, specialty magazines and sports sections in national newspapers began proclaiming the excitement of hickory shad fishing ("HICKORY SHAD ARE RUNNING!") and the recovery of the fishery. In the two most recent years of a North Carolina creel survey (2004–2005), hickory shad – a fish only present for two months of the year – moved from sixth- to the fourth-most targeted fish by coastal anglers. They are also taken by recreational fishing for use as bait to catch larger fish.

== Literature ==
Most information about this species is contained in federal and state documents and management plans or theses from universities. Federal publications include reports from the Atlantic States Marine Fisheries Commission's (ASMFC) Interstate Fishery Management Plan for Shad and River Herring. Prominent publications by state agencies include reports based on fishery monitoring programs in Connecticut, Pennsylvania and Maryland, North Carolina, South Carolina, Georgia, and Florida. A few publications address coast-wide and/or genus-level stock status and management issues. The U.S. Fish and Wildlife Service published a useful series that includes egg, larvae, and juvenile development descriptions of hickory shad. A recent review of hickory shad in Chesapeake Bay places management of this species in an ecosystem context. Three master of science theses also studied them.

Although hickory shad research has been limited, other clupeids, especially Alosa species in the United States, have received more attention.
