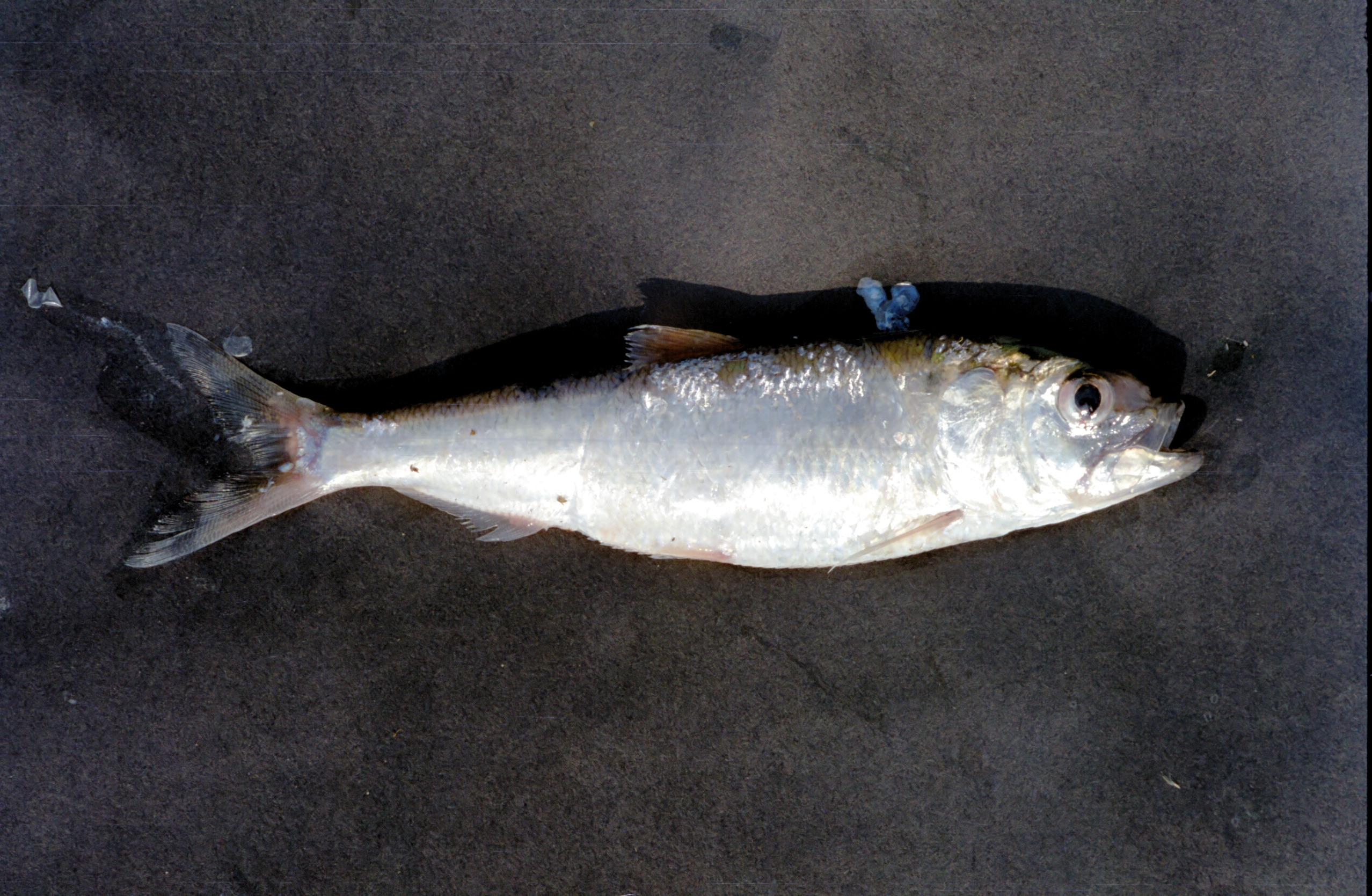

Conservation status
- Critically Endangered (IUCN 3.1)

Scientific classification
- Kingdom: Animalia
- Phylum: Chordata
- Class: Actinopterygii
- Division: Teleostei
- Order: Clupeiformes
- Family: Alosidae
- Genus: Alosa
- Species: A. macedonica

Binomial name
- Alosa macedonica (Vinciguerra, 1921)

Synonyms
- Clupea macedonica Vinciguerra, 1921; Alosa caspia macedonica (Vinciguerra, 1921)

= Alosa macedonica =

Species of fish

Alosa macedonica, or the Macedonian shad or liparia, is a species of freshwater ray-finned fish belonging to the family Alosidae, the shads, pilchards and related fishes. Shads are typically anadromous but the Macedonian shad has become landlocked. This species is endemic to Greece.

== Taxonomy ==
Alosa macedonica was first formally described as Clupea macedonica in 1921 by the Italian physician and ichthyologist Decio Vinciguerra with its type locality given as Lake Besikia in, Macedonia, Greece. This species is now classified in the genus Alosa, which was proposed by Johann Heinrich Friedrich Link in 1797, within the family Alosidae in the order Clupeiformes, the herrings and related fishes.

== Etymology ==
Alaosa macedonica belongs to the genus Alosa, a derivatuion of alausa the Latin name for Clupea alosa which is the type species of the genus through absolute tautonymy. The specific name means "of Macedonia", the region of Greece to which this fish is endemic.

== Distribution and habitat ==
Alosa macedonica is endemic to Greece where it is restricted to Lake Volvi in the Mygdonia catchment in northern Greece. Its presence in neighbouring Lake Koroneia has been claimed, and that this species was extirpated from there when it dried up in the 1990s, however, its presence in that lake has never been confirmed. The liparia is pelagic living in the upper layers of the lake in the warmer months and retreating to deeper water in the cooler parts of the year.

== Biology ==
Alosa macedonica is a member of the genus Alosa, whose other species are often anadromous migrating between marine and freshwater. Research suggests that the ancestors of Alosa macedonica inhabited marine regions of the Aegean Sea.

Alosa macedonica have teeth in the palatine and vomer. They have approximately 50 vertebrae and 106-128 gill rakers. They are about 181–230 mm (7.1–9.1 in) in length and spawn around the months of July and August.

== Reproduction ==
It reproduces once a year, and the breeding season lasts from mid-June to mid-August.

== Feeding habits ==
It feeds primarily on zooplankton, engaging in selective predation. However, larger individuals show a preference for a piscivorous diet, consuming fish such as Knipowitschia caucasica and Rhodeus amarus.

== Conservation ==
Alosa macedonica is classified as Critically endangered by the International Union for Conservation of Nature. Threats to this species include pollution, falling water levels in the lake due to abstraction and invasive species.
