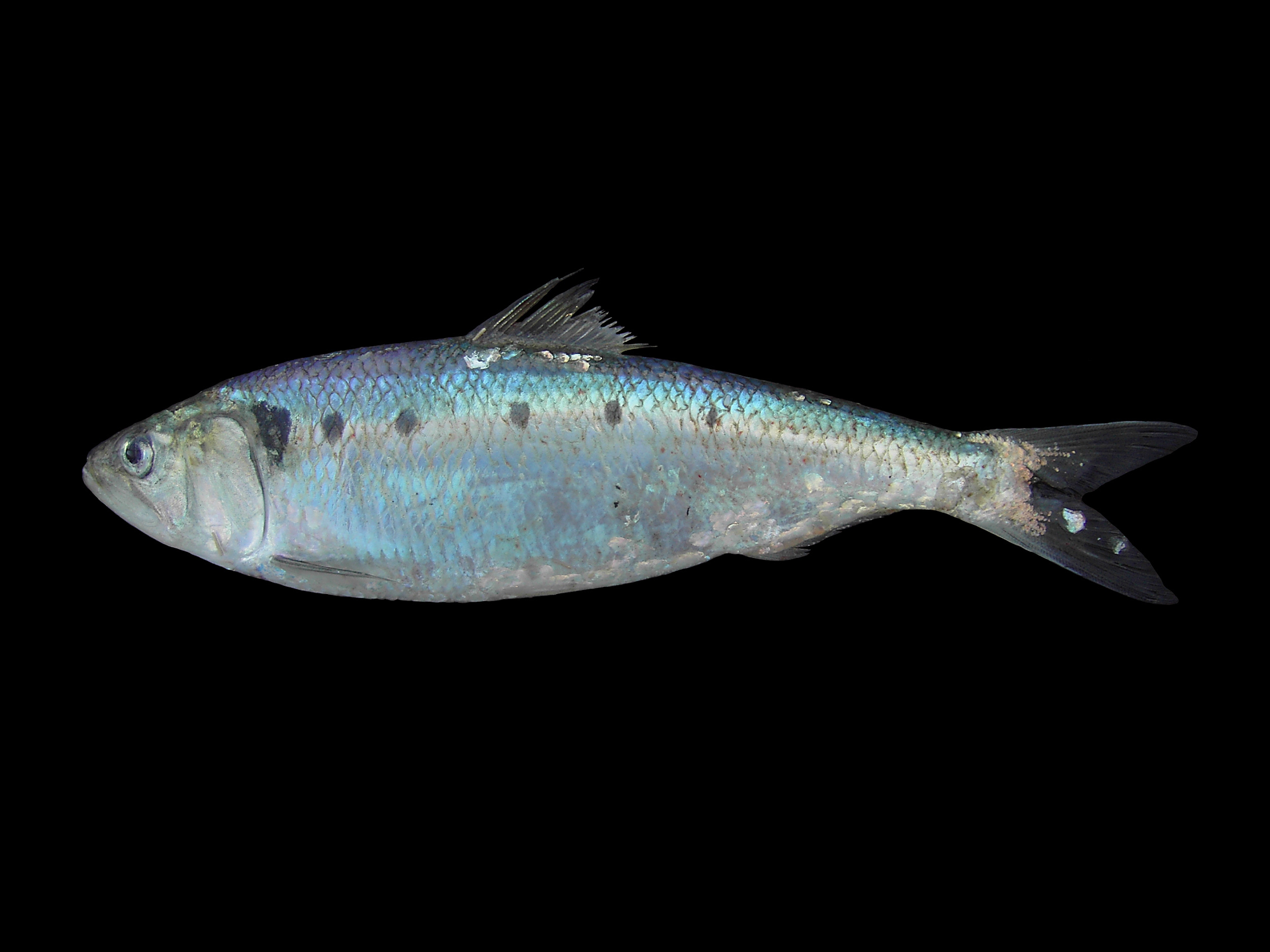

Conservation status
- Least Concern (IUCN 3.1)

Scientific classification
- Kingdom: Animalia
- Phylum: Chordata
- Class: Actinopterygii
- Division: Teleostei
- Order: Clupeiformes
- Family: Alosidae
- Genus: Alosa
- Species: A. fallax

Binomial name
- Alosa fallax Lacépède, 1800

= Twait shad =

Species of fish

The twait shad or twaite shad (Alosa fallax) is a species of fish in the family Alosidae. It is found in the eastern Atlantic Ocean and the Mediterranean Sea and is an anadromous fish which lives in the sea but migrates into fresh water to spawn. In appearance it resembles an Atlantic herring but has a row of six to ten distinctive spots on its silvery flanks. They become mature when three or more years old and migrate to estuaries, later swimming up rivers to spawn. Populations of this fish have declined due to overfishing, pollution and habitat destruction. Conservation of this species is covered by Appendix III of the Bern Convention and Appendix II and V of the European Community Habitats Directive.

== Description ==
The twait shad is a typical herring-type fish and much resembles the allis shad. It has no lateral line and the belly is more rounded than that of the sprat and Baltic herring. The gill cover is ridged and the caudal peduncle has large, plate-like scales. This fish is more colourful than the Baltic herring. The back is a bluish green colour and the head brownish with a golden tinge on the operculum. The flanks are silvery, sometimes with a bronzy tinge, and there are a distinctive row of six to ten large dark spot just behind the gill cover though these may fade when the fish is dead. The adult length is typically 25 to 40 cm (10 to 16 in).

== Distribution ==
The twait shad is found in most of Europe and throughout the Mediterranean Sea.

== Biology and lifecycle ==
Alosa fallax has a similar lifecycle to A. alosa (allis shad). They are known to live in sympatry. Some studies have suggested A. fallax and A. alosa species can hybridize. They are anadromous species, like many other species in the genus Alosa. However, some record of them being landlocked suggests an ability to adapt well to their environment. They primarily live at sea on feeding grounds and migrate to their spawning grounds between April and June once they are sexually mature. Maturity usually ranges from 3–7 years of age. Juveniles appear in estuaries and brackish water around June to July. The salinity of brackish water may pose problems to the juveniles migrating from fresh water.

== Population reduction ==
Populations have been reduced primarily through overfishing, pollution, habitat destruction and migratory route obstruction in the Victorian Era. Hybridization between species is more likely with species affected by human disturbances. It is estimated that the estuarine phase, or the time that they are in the estuaries migrating from spawning grounds to sea, has a duration in A. fallax of up to a year and a half. The estimate, however, does not take into account individual variation and survival of juveniles in the estuarine phase.

== Conservation ==
Four special areas of conservation have been designated in Ireland where Alosa species have been known to spawn. Alosa fallax has been placed in Appendix III of the Bern Convention (1979) that lists protected fauna species as well as in appendix II and V of the European Community Habitats Directive (1992) that list, respectively, species whose conservation requires the designation of special areas of conservation and that are subject to management measures."

In England the Unlocking The Severn project, a consortium of the Canal & River Trust, Severn Rivers Trust, Environment Agency and Natural England, is creating fish passes around weirs on the River Severn. The aim is to open 150 miles (240 km) of the river for the fish to increase its freshwater breeding habitat. By 2021 passes at Diglis and Bevere, near Worcester, had been completed, and by 2022 all four passes were completed and it was confirmed that the twaite shad had passed all of the passes, allowing the species to return to its natural spawning habitat.

== See also ==
- Shad fishing
