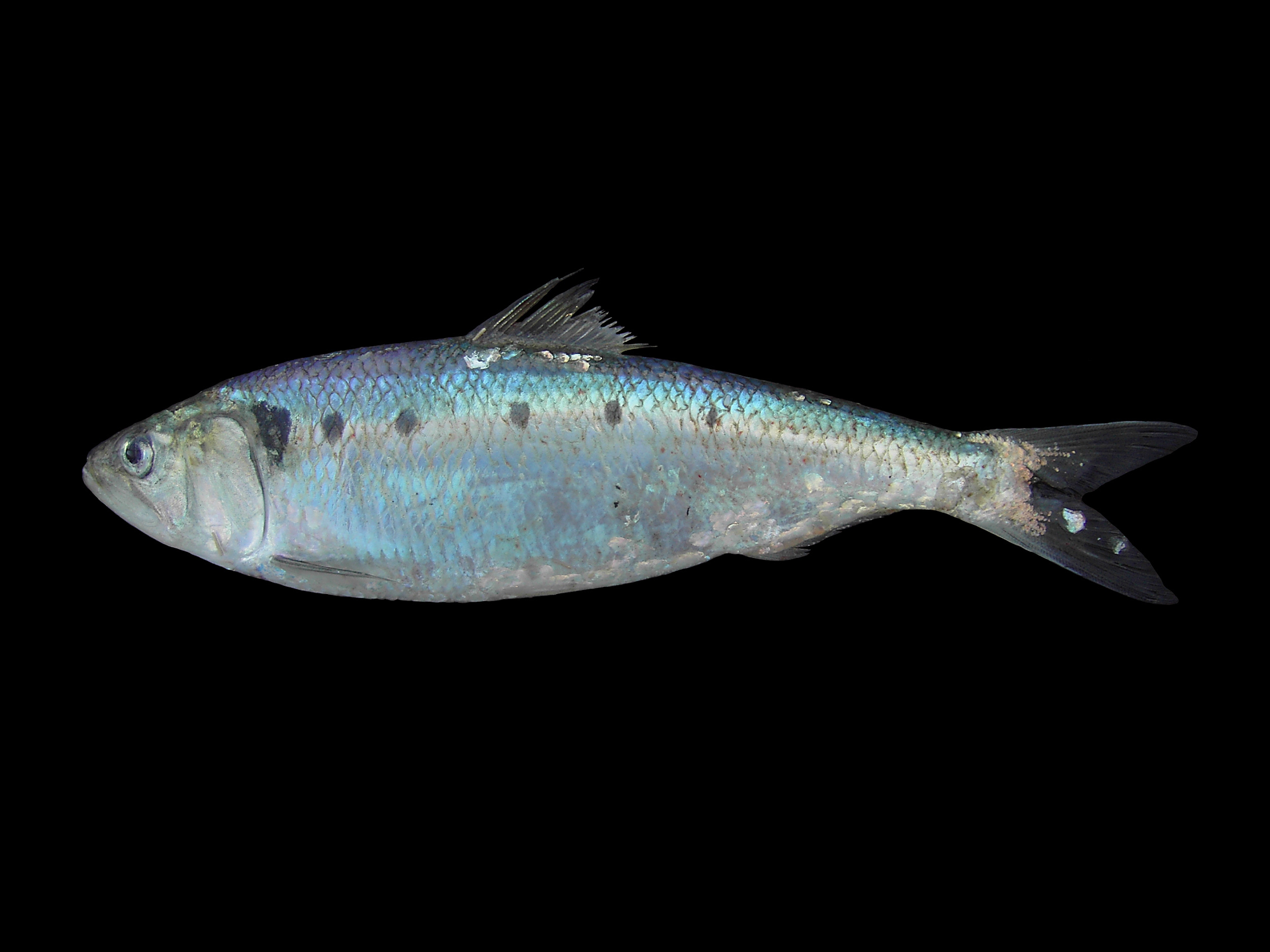
- Twaite shad, Alosa fallax

Scientific classification
- Kingdom: Animalia
- Phylum: Chordata
- Class: Actinopterygii
- Division: Teleostei
- Order: Clupeiformes
- Suborder: Clupeoidei
- Family: Alosidae; Svetovidov, 1952

Genera
- see text

= Alosidae =

Alosidae Temporal range: Early Eocene to present

Family of fishes

The Alosidae, or the shads, are a family of clupeiform fishes. The family currently comprises five genera worldwide, and about 33 species.

The shads are pelagic (open water) schooling fish, of which many are anadromous or even landlocked. Several species are of commercial importance, e.g. in the genus Alosa (river herrings), Brevoortia (menhadens), and Sardina. The Alosidae were previously included in the herring family Clupeidae.

== Genera ==
Alosidae contains the following 5 genera:

- Alosa H. F. Linck, 1790 (Shads)
- Brevoortia Gill, 1861 (Menhadens)
- Ethmidium Thompson, 1916 (Pacific menhaden)
- Sardina Antipa, 1904 (European pilchard)
- Sardinops C. L. Hubbs, 1929 (Blue pilchard)

The following fossil Alosidae are also known:

- †Eoalosa Marramà & Carnevale, 2017 (early Eocene of Italy)
- †Moldavichthys Baykina & Schwarzhans, 2017 (mid-late Miocene of Moldova)
- †Sanalosa Bienkowska-Wasiluk, Granica & Kovalchuk, 2024 (Oligocene of Poland)

The oldest member of the group was originally thought to be Pugliaclupea from the Campanian of Italy, but its placement in the Alosidae appears to be on weak grounds, and it has more recently found to be an ellimmichthyiform, most likely in the Armigatidae. True fossil members of the family are only known from the Eocene onwards. There appears to have been a significant center of endemism for the alosids and other clupeoids in the Paratethys. The freshwater †Chasmoclupea from the Oligocene of Egypt was originally though to be related to the Alosidae, but has since been found to be a dorosomatid.

== Ultrasound hearing ==
While the hearing of most fishes is limited in frequency to less than 1 kHz, some shads and menhadens demonstrate an unusual ability to detect very high frequency sound (ultrasound) above 50 kHz

== See also ==
- The Shad Foundation
- Shad Planking, a Virginia political gathering featuring the consumption of American shad
