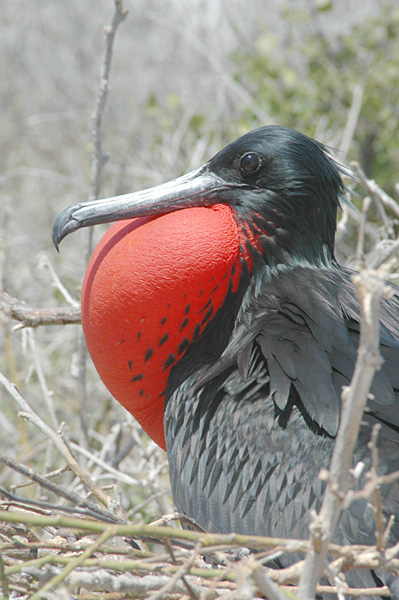
- Male magnificent frigatebird (Fregata magnificens) displaying gular pouch, Galápagos Islands.

Scientific classification
- Kingdom: Animalia
- Phylum: Chordata
- Class: Aves
- Order: Suliformes
- Family: Fregatidae; Degland & Gerbe, 1867
- Genus: Fregata; Lacépède, 1799

Type species
- Pelecanus aquilus (Ascension frigatebird) Linnaeus, 1758

Species
- Fregata magnificens – Magnificent frigatebird; Fregata aquila – Ascension frigatebird; Fregata andrewsi – Christmas frigatebird; Fregata minor – Great frigatebird; Fregata ariel – Lesser frigatebird
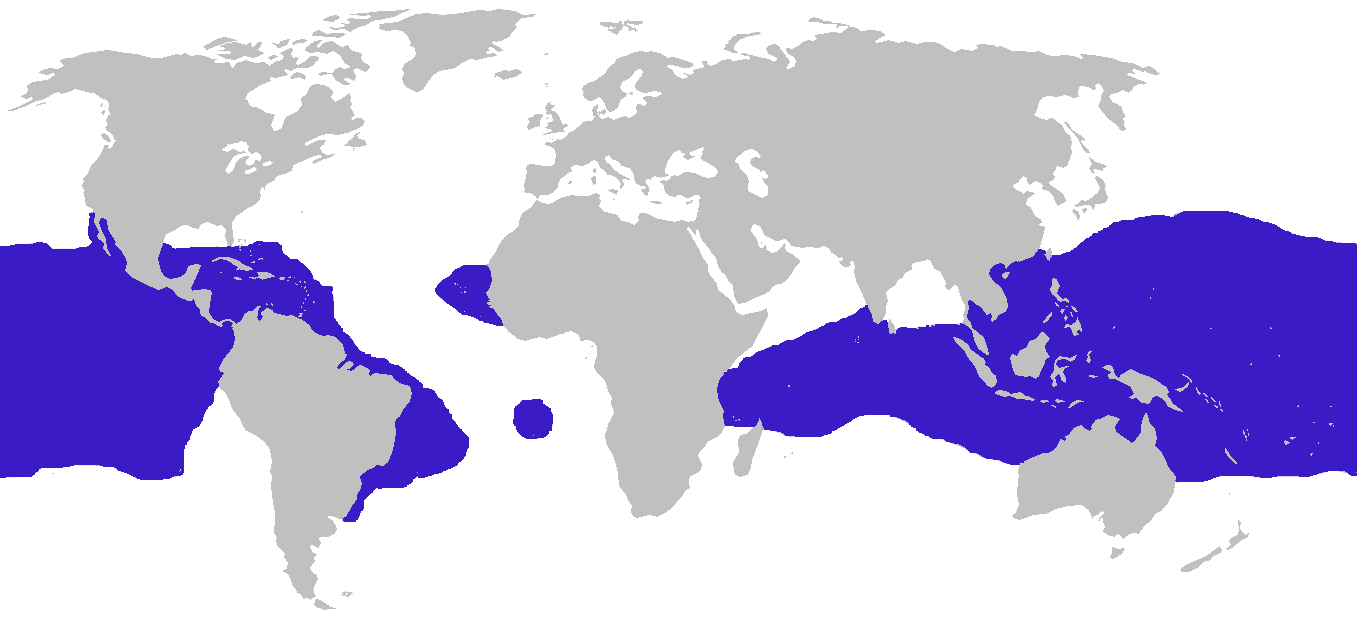
- Range map

= Frigatebird =

Frigatebird Temporal range: Early Eocene to present 50–present Ma

Family of seabirds (Fregatidae)

Frigatebirds are a family of seabirds called Fregatidae which are found across all tropical and subtropical oceans. The five extant species are classified in a single genus, Fregata. All have predominantly black plumage, long, deeply forked tails and long hooked bills. Females have white underbellies and males have a distinctive red gular pouch which they inflate during the breeding season to attract females. Their wings are long and pointed and can span up to 2.3 metres (7.5 ft), the largest wing area to body mass ratio of any bird.

Able to soar for weeks on wind currents, frigatebirds spend most of the day in flight hunting for food, and roost on trees or cliffs at night. Their main prey are fish and squid, caught when chased to the water surface by large predators such as tuna. Frigatebirds are referred to as kleptoparasites as they occasionally rob other seabirds for food, and are known to snatch seabird chicks from the nest. Seasonally monogamous, frigatebirds nest colonially. A rough nest is constructed in low trees or on the ground on remote islands. A single egg is laid each breeding season. The duration of parental care is among the longest of any bird species; frigatebirds are able to breed only every other year.

The Fregatidae are a sister group to Suloidea which consists of cormorants, darters, gannets, and boobies. Three of the five extant species of frigatebirds are widespread (the magnificent, great and lesser frigatebirds), while two are endangered (the Christmas Island and Ascension Island frigatebirds) and restrict their breeding habitat to one small island each. The oldest fossils date to the early Eocene, around 50 million years ago. The three extinct relatives are classified in the genus Limnofregata, and had shorter, less-hooked bills and longer legs, and lived in a freshwater environment.

== Taxonomy ==
=== Etymology ===
The term Frigate Bird itself was used in 1738 by the English naturalist and illustrator Eleazar Albin in his A Natural History of the Birds. The book included an illustration of the male bird showing the red gular pouch. Like the genus name, the English term is derived from the French mariners' name for the bird la frégate—a frigate or fast warship. The etymology was mentioned by French naturalist Jean-Baptiste Du Tertre when describing the bird in 1667. (Note: Du Tertre wrote: "Loyseau que les habitans des Indes appellent Fregate (à cause de la vistesse de son vol) n'a pas le corp plus gros qu'une poule ..." ("The bird that the inhabitants of the Indies call "frigate" (because of the speed of its flight) has a body no larger than a chicken's.")) Alternative names and spellings include "frigate bird", "frigate-bird", "frigate", "frigate-petrel".

Christopher Columbus encountered frigatebirds when passing the Cape Verde Islands on his first voyage across the Atlantic in 1492. In his journal entry for 29 September he used the word rabiforçado, modern Spanish rabihorcado or forktail. (Note: Columbus's journal survives in a version recorded by Bartholomé de las Casas in the 1530s. In English the entry reads: "They saw a bird that is called a frigatebird, which makes the boobies throw up what they eat in order to eat it herself, and she does not sustain herself on anything else. It is a seabird, but does not alight on the sea nor depart from land 20 leagues. There are many of these on the islands of Cape Verde.") In the Caribbean frigatebirds were called Man-of-War birds by English mariners. This name was used by the English explorer William Dampier in his book An Account of a New Voyage Around the World published in 1697:

The Man-of-War (as it is called by the English) is about the bigness of a Kite, and in shape like it, but black; and the neck is red. It lives on Fish yet never lights on the water, but soars aloft like a Kite, and when it sees its prey, it flys down head foremost to the Waters edge, very swiftly takes its prey out of the Sea with his Bill, and immediately mounts again as swiftly; never touching the Water with his Bill. His Wings are very long; his feet are like other Land-fowl, and he builds on Trees, where he finds any; but where they are wanting on the ground.

=== Classification ===
Frigatebirds were grouped with cormorants, and sulids (gannets and boobies) as well as pelicans in the genus Pelecanus by Linnaeus in 1758 in the tenth edition of his Systema Naturae. He described the distinguishing characteristics as a straight bill hooked at the tip, linear nostrils, a bare face, and fully webbed feet. The genus Fregata was introduced by French naturalist Bernard Germain de Lacépède in 1799. The type species was designated as the Ascension frigatebird by French zoologist François Marie Daudin in 1802. Louis Pierre Vieillot described the genus name Tachypetes in 1816 for the great frigatebird. The genus name Atagen had been coined by German naturalist Paul Möhring in 1752, though this has no validity as it predates the official beginning of Linnaean taxonomy.

In 1874, English zoologist Alfred Henry Garrod published a study where he had examined various groups of birds and recorded which muscles of a selected group of five (Note: ambiens, fermorocaudal, accessory femorocaudal, semitendinosus, and accessory tendinosus) they possessed or lacked. Noting that the muscle patterns were different among the steganopodes (classical Pelecaniformes), he resolved that there were divergent lineages in the group that should be in separate families, including frigatebirds in their own family Fregatidae. Urless N. Lanham observed in 1947 that frigatebirds bore some skeletal characteristics more in common with Procellariiformes than Pelecaniformes, though concluded they still belonged in the latter group (as suborder Fregatae), albeit as an early offshoot. Martyn Kennedy and colleagues derived a cladogram based on behavioural characteristics of the traditional Pelecaniformes, calculating the frigatebirds to be more divergent than pelicans from a core group of gannets, darters and cormorants, and tropicbirds the most distant lineage. The classification of this group as the traditional Pelecaniformes, united by feet that are totipalmate (with all four toes linked by webbing) and the presence of a gular pouch, persisted until the early 1990s. The DNA–DNA hybridization studies of Charles Sibley and Jon Edward Ahlquist placed the frigatebirds in a lineage with penguins, loons, petrels and albatrosses. Subsequent genetic studies place the frigatebirds as a sister group to the group Suloidea, which comprises the gannets and boobies, cormorants and darters. Microscopic analysis of eggshell structure by Konstantin Mikhailov in 1995 found that the eggshells of frigatebirds resembled those of other Pelecaniformes in having a covering of thick microglobular material over the crystalline shells.

Molecular studies have consistently shown that pelicans, the namesake family of the Pelecaniformes, are actually more closely related to herons, ibises and spoonbills, the hamerkop and the shoebill than to the remaining species. In recognition of this, the order comprising the frigatebirds and Suloidea was renamed Suliformes in 2010.

In 1994, the family name Fregatidae, cited as described in 1867 by French naturalists Côme-Damien Degland and Zéphirin Gerbe, was conserved under Article 40(b) of the International Code of Zoological Nomenclature in preference to the 1840 description Tachypetidae by Johann Friedrich von Brandt. This was because the genus names Atagen and Tachypetes had been synonymised with Fregata before 1961, resulting in the aligning of family and genus names.

=== Fossil record ===
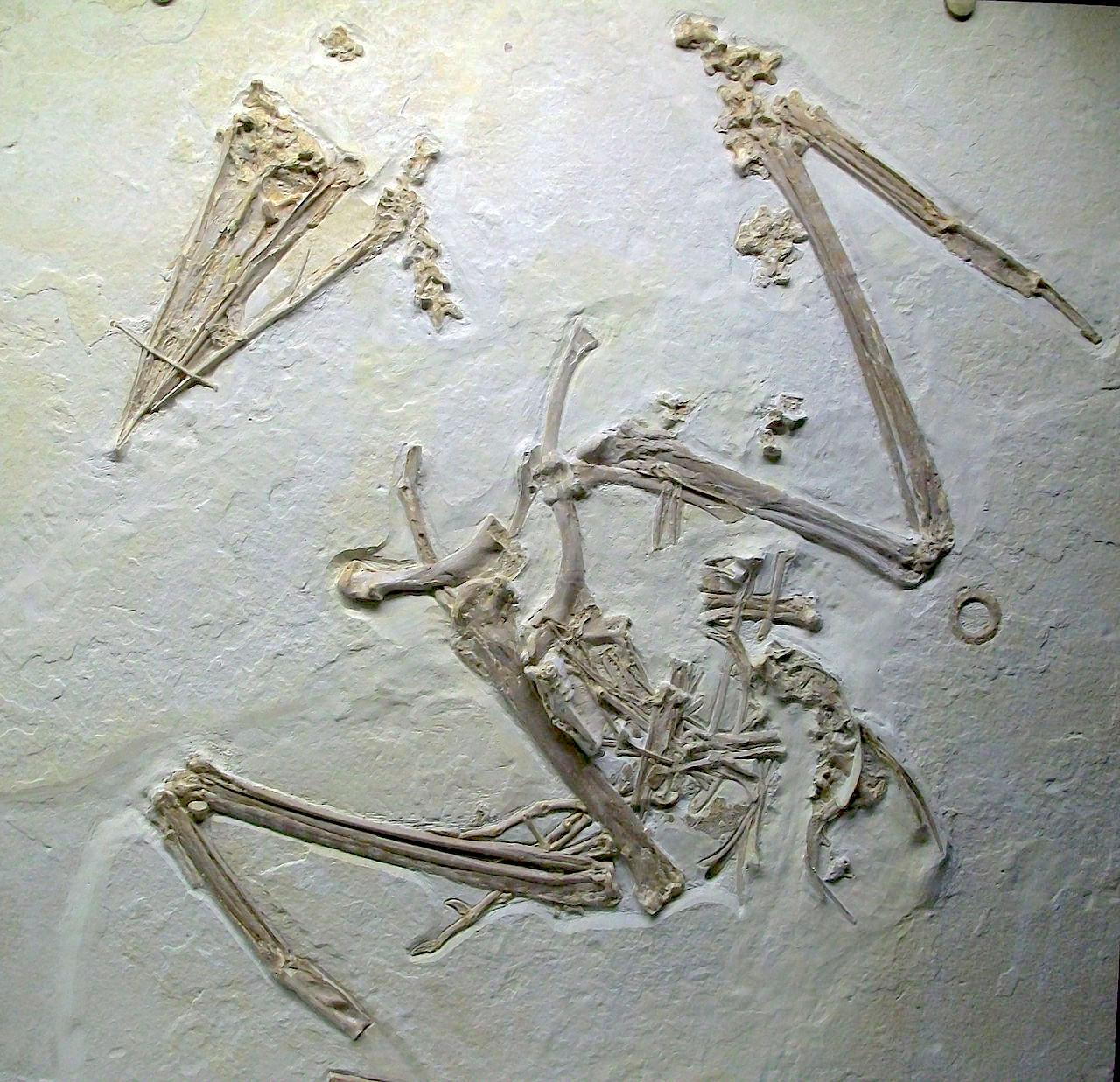
Fossil of Eocene species Limnofregata azygosternon

The Eocene frigatebird genus Limnofregata comprises birds whose fossil remains were recovered from prehistoric freshwater environments, unlike the marine preferences of their modern-day relatives. They had shorter less-hooked bills and longer legs, and longer slit-like nasal openings. Three species have been described from fossil deposits in the western United States, two—L. azygosternon and L. hasegawai—from the Green River Formation (48–52 million years old) and one—L. hutchisoni—from the Wasatch Formation (between 53 and 55 million years of age). Fossil material indistinguishable from living species dating to the Pleistocene and Holocene has been recovered from Ascension Island (for F. aquila), Saint Helena Island, both in the southern Atlantic Ocean, and also from various islands in the Pacific Ocean (for F. minor and F. ariel). A tarsometatarsus and pedal phalanx from the Lower Eocene London Clay of the Walton-on-the-Naze resembles Limnofregata, but being notably larger and distinct in other ways, was tentatively referred to Marinavis longirostris due to similar stratigraphy, geography, size, and presumed frigatebird affinities.

A cladistic study of the skeletal and bone morphology of the classical Pelecaniformes and relatives found that the frigatebirds formed a clade with Limnofregata. Birds of the two genera have 15 cervical vertebrae, unlike almost all other Ciconiiformes, Suliformes and Pelecaniformes, which have 17. The age of Limnofregata indicates that these lineages had separated by the Eocene.

=== Living species and infrageneric classification ===
Frigatebird phylogeny

- - Lesser frigatebird (Fregata ariel)
  - - - Christmas frigatebird (Fregata andrewsi)
      - Great frigatebird (Fregata minor)
    - - Ascension frigatebird (Fregata aquila)
      - Magnificent frigatebird (Fregata magnificens)

The type species of the genus is the Ascension frigatebird (Fregata aquila). For many years, the consensus was to recognise only two species of frigatebird, with larger birds as F. aquila and smaller as F. ariel. In 1914 the Australian ornithologist Gregory Mathews delineated five species, which remain valid. Analysis of ribosomal and mitochondrial DNA indicated that the five species had diverged from a common ancestor only recently—as little as 1.5 million years ago. There are two species pairs, the great and Christmas Island frigatebirds, and the magnificent and Ascension frigatebirds, while the fifth species, the lesser frigatebird, is an early offshoot of the common ancestor of the other four species. Two subspecies of the magnificent, three subspecies of the lesser and five subspecies of the great frigatebird are recognised.

Living species of frigatebirds
Common and binomial names	Image	Description	Range
Magnificent frigatebird (Fregata magnificens); Mathews, 1914		With a body length of 89–114 cm (35–45 in), it is the largest species and has the longest bill. The adult male is all-black with a scarlet throat pouch that is inflated like a balloon in the breeding season. Although the feathers are black, the scapular feathers have a purple sheen, in contrast to the male great frigatebird's green sheen. The female is brownish-black, but has a white breast and lower neck sides, a brown band on the wings, and a blueish-grey eye-ring.	Widespread in the tropical Atlantic, it breeds in colonies in trees in Florida, the Caribbean and Cape Verde Islands, as well as along the Pacific coast of the Americas from Mexico to Ecuador, including the Galápagos Islands.
Ascension frigatebird (Fregata aquila) (Linnaeus, 1758)		Apart from its smaller size, the adult male is very similar to the magnificent frigatebird. The female is brownish black with a rusty brown mantle and chest, and normally lacks any white patches present on the front of female birds of other species. The occasional female observed with a white belly may be breeding before obtaining the full adult plumage.	Found on Boatswain Bird Island just off Ascension Island in the tropical Atlantic Ocean, having not bred on the main island since the 1800s.
Christmas frigatebird (Fregata andrewsi); Mathews, 1914		The adult male is one of the frigatebird species with white on its belly—an egg shaped patch. It is larger with a longer bill than the related great frigatebird. Its upperparts are black with green metallic gloss on the mantle and scapulars. The female has dark upperparts with brown wing bars, a black head with white belly and white collar (sometimes incomplete) around its neck.	Breeds only on Christmas Island in the eastern Indian Ocean.
Great frigatebird (Fregata minor) (Gmelin, 1789)		The adult male has black upperparts with green metallic gloss on the mantle and scapulars. It is completely black underneath with subtle brown barring on the axillaries. The upperparts of the female are dark with lighter brown wing bars. Its head is black with a mottled throat and belly. The neck has a white collar.	Found in tropical Indian and Pacific oceans, as well as one colony—Trindade and Martim Vaz—in the south Atlantic, generally where the water is warmer than 22 °C (72 °F), and breeding on islands and atolls with sufficient vegetation to nest in.
Lesser frigatebird (Fregata ariel) (G. R.Gray, 1845)		With a body length of around 75 cm (30 in), it is the smallest species. The adult male has black upperparts with greenish to purple metallic gloss on the mantle and scapulars, and is black underneath except for bold white axillary spurs. The upperparts of the female are dark with lighter wing bars. The head is black while the belly and the neck collar are white.	Tropical and subtropical waters across the Indian and Pacific Oceans. Atlantic race trinitatis was limited to Trindade, off Eastern Brazil but may now be extinct.

== Description ==
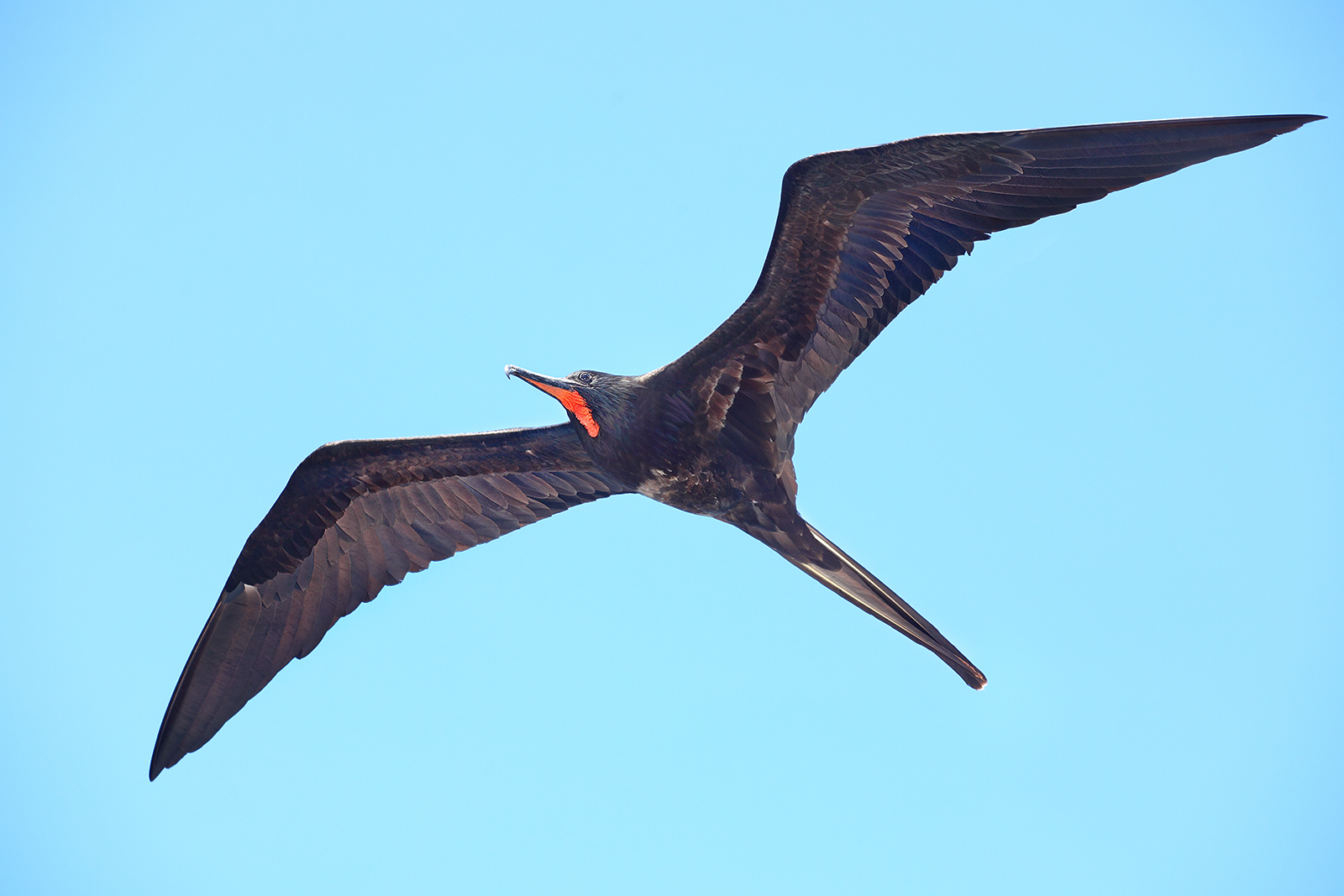
Male magnificent frigatebird in the Galapagos Islands

Frigatebirds are large, slender, mostly black-plumaged, seabirds, with the five species similar in appearance to each other. The largest species is the magnificent frigatebird, which reaches 114 cm (45 in) in length, with three of the remaining four almost as large. The lesser frigatebird is substantially smaller, at around 71 cm (28 in) long. Frigatebirds exhibit marked sexual dimorphism; females are larger and up to 25 percent heavier than males, and generally have white markings on their underparts. Frigatebirds have short necks and long, slender, hooked bills. Their long narrow wings (male wingspan can reach 2.3 metres (7.5 ft)) taper to points. Their wings have eleven primary flight feathers, with the tenth the longest and eleventh a vestigial feather only, and 23 secondaries. Their tails are deeply forked, though this is not apparent unless the tail is fanned. The tail and wings give them a distinctive 'W' silhouette in flight. The legs and face are fully feathered. The totipalmate feet are short and weak; the webbing is reduced and part of each toe is free.

The bones of frigatebirds are markedly pneumatic, making them very light and contributing only 5% to total body weight. The pectoral girdle is strong as its bones are fused. The pectoral muscles are well-developed, and weigh as much as the frigatebird's feathers—around half the body weight is made up equally of these muscles and feathers. The males have inflatable red-coloured throat pouches called gular pouches which they inflate to attract females during the mating season. The gular sac is, perhaps, the most striking frigatebird feature. These can deflate only slowly, so males that are disturbed will fly off with pouches distended for some time.

Frigatebirds remain in the air and do not settle on the ocean. They produce very little oil from their uropygial glands, so their feathers would become sodden if they settled on the surface. In addition, with their long wings relative to body size, they would have great difficulty taking off again.

== Distribution and habitat ==
Frigatebirds are found over tropical oceans, and ride warm updrafts under cumulus clouds. Their range coincides with availability of food such as flying fish, and with the trade winds, which provide the windy conditions that facilitate their flying. They occur as rare vagrants to temperate regions and are not found in polar latitudes. Adults are generally sedentary, remaining near the islands where they breed. However, male frigatebirds have been recorded dispersing great distances after departing a breeding colony—one male great frigatebird relocated from Europa Island in the Mozambique Channel to the Maldives 4,400 km (2,700 mi) away, and a male magnificent frigatebird flew 1,400 km (870 mi) from French Guiana to Trinidad. In 2015, a magnificent frigatebird was spotted as far north as Michigan. Great frigatebirds marked with wing tags on Tern Island in the French Frigate Shoals were found to regularly travel the 873 km (542 mi) to Johnston Atoll, although one was reported in Quezon City in the Philippines. Genetic testing seems to indicate that the species has fidelity to their site of hatching despite their high mobility. Young birds may disperse far and wide, with distances of up to 6,000 km (3,700 mi) recorded.

== Behaviour and ecology ==
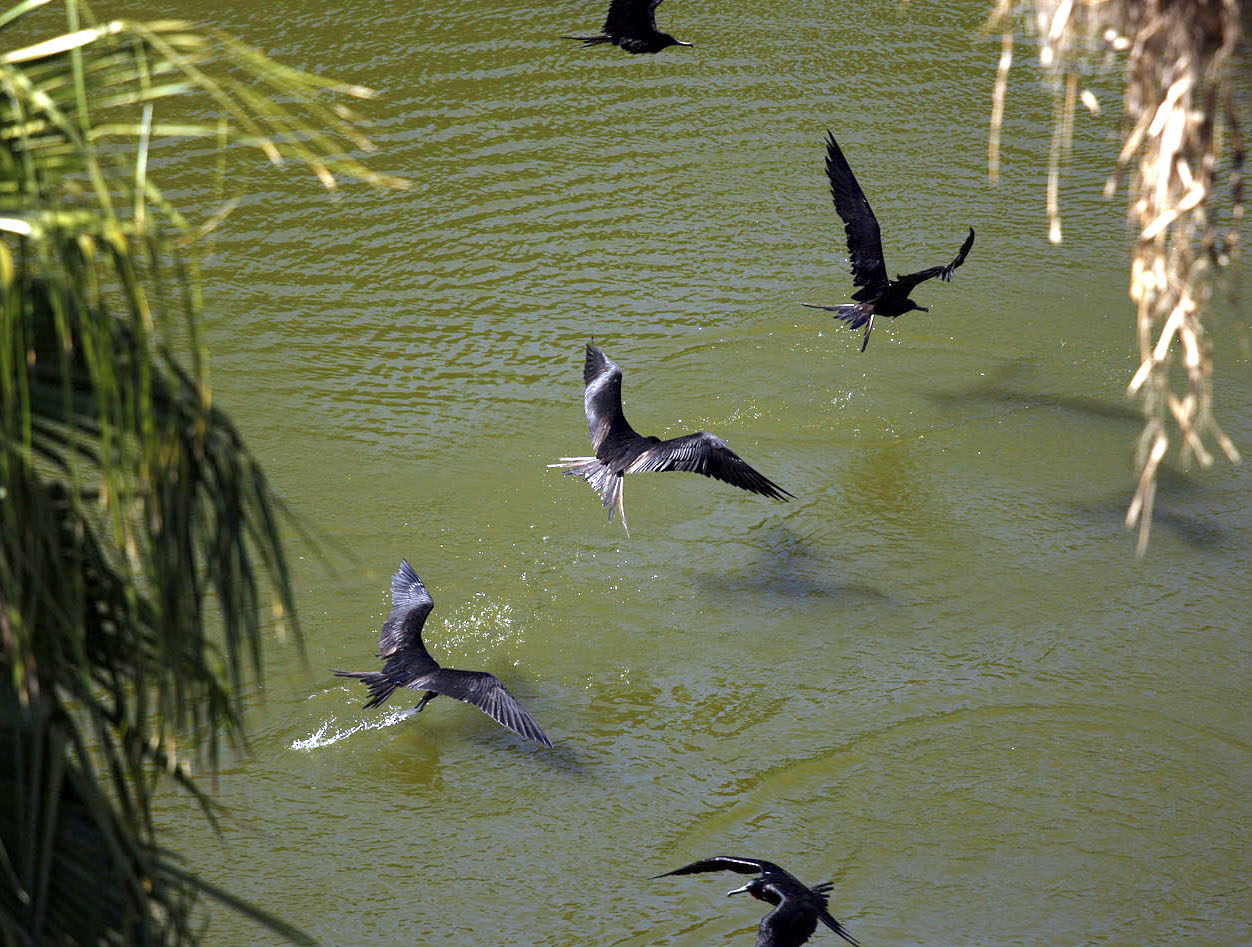
Magnificent frigatebirds drinking freshwater

Having the largest wing-area-to-body-weight ratio of any bird, frigatebirds are essentially aerial. This allows them to soar continuously and only rarely flap their wings. One great frigatebird, being tracked by satellite in the Indian Ocean, stayed aloft for two months. They can fly higher than 4,000 meters in freezing conditions. Like swifts they are able to spend the night on the wing, but they will also return to an island to roost on trees or cliffs. Field observations in the Mozambique Channel found that great frigatebirds could remain on the wing for up to 12 days while foraging. Highly adept, they use their forked tails for steering during flight and make strong deep wing-beats, though not suited to flying by sustained flapping. Frigatebirds bathe and clean themselves in flight by flying low and splashing at the water surface before preening and scratching afterwards. Conversely, frigatebirds do not swim and with their short legs cannot walk well or take off from the sea easily.

According to a study in the journal Nature Communications, scientists attached an accelerometer and an electroencephalogram testing device on nine great frigatebirds to measure if they slept during flight. The study found the birds do sleep, but usually only using one hemisphere of the brain at a time and usually sleep while ascending at higher altitudes. The amount of time mid-air sleeping was less than an hour and always at night.

The average life span is unknown but in common with seabirds such as the wandering albatross and Leach's storm petrel, frigatebirds are long-lived. In 2002, 35 ringed great frigatebirds were recovered on Tern Island in the Hawaiian Islands. Of these ten were older than 37 years and one was at least 44 years of age.

Despite having dark plumage in a tropical climate, frigatebirds have found ways not to overheat—particularly as they are exposed to full sunlight when on the nest. They ruffle feathers to lift them away from the skin and improve air circulation, and can extend and upturn their wings to expose the hot undersurface to the air and lose heat by evaporation and convection. Frigatebirds also place their heads in the shade of their wings, and males frequently flutter their gular pouches.

Unlike most seabirds, frigatebirds are thermal soarers, using thermals to glide. This is in contrast to birds like albatrosses, which are dynamic soarers, using winds produced by the waves to stay aloft.

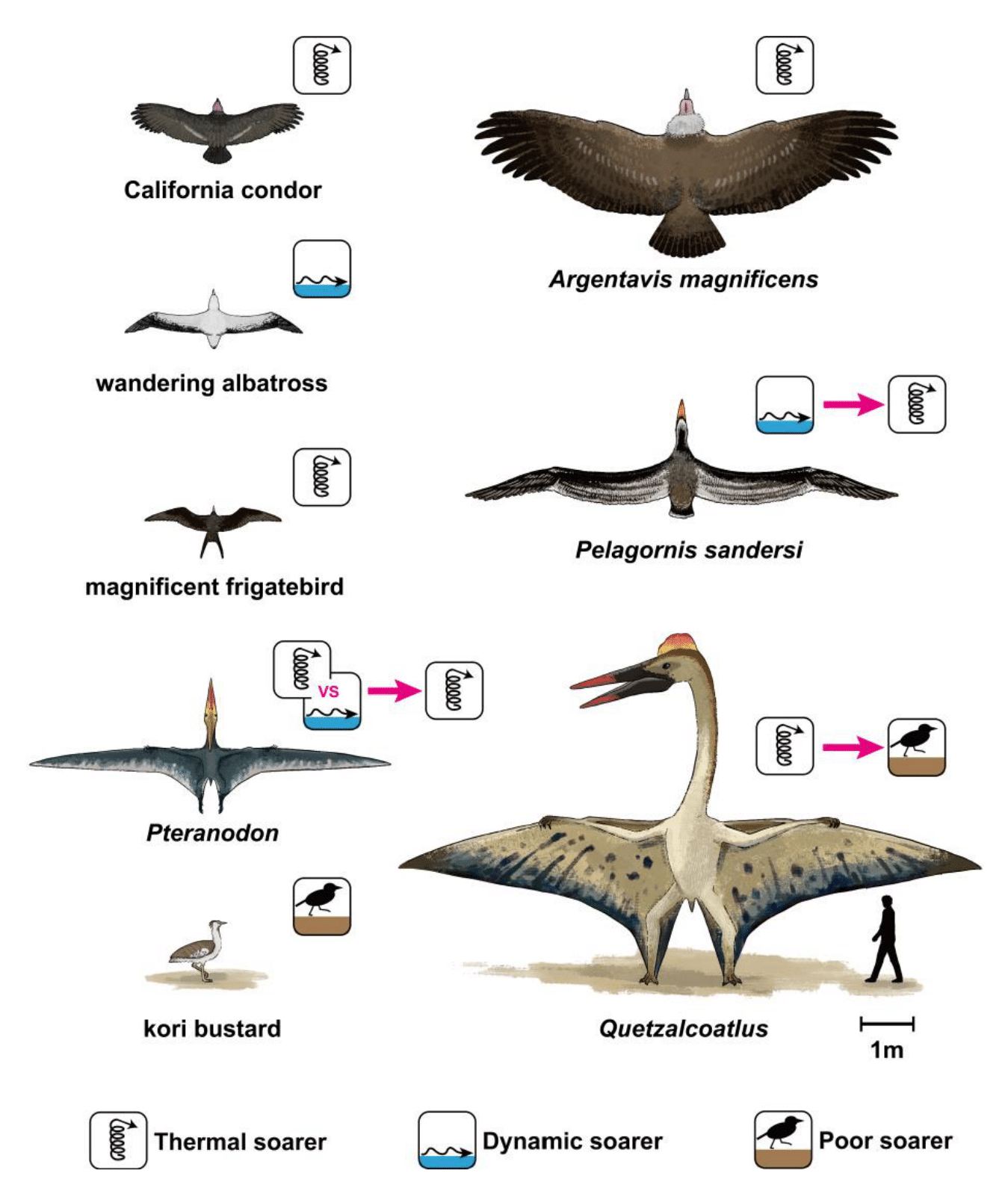
Soaring styles in extinct and extant flyers. Frigatebirds are marked as thermal soarers.

=== Breeding behaviour ===
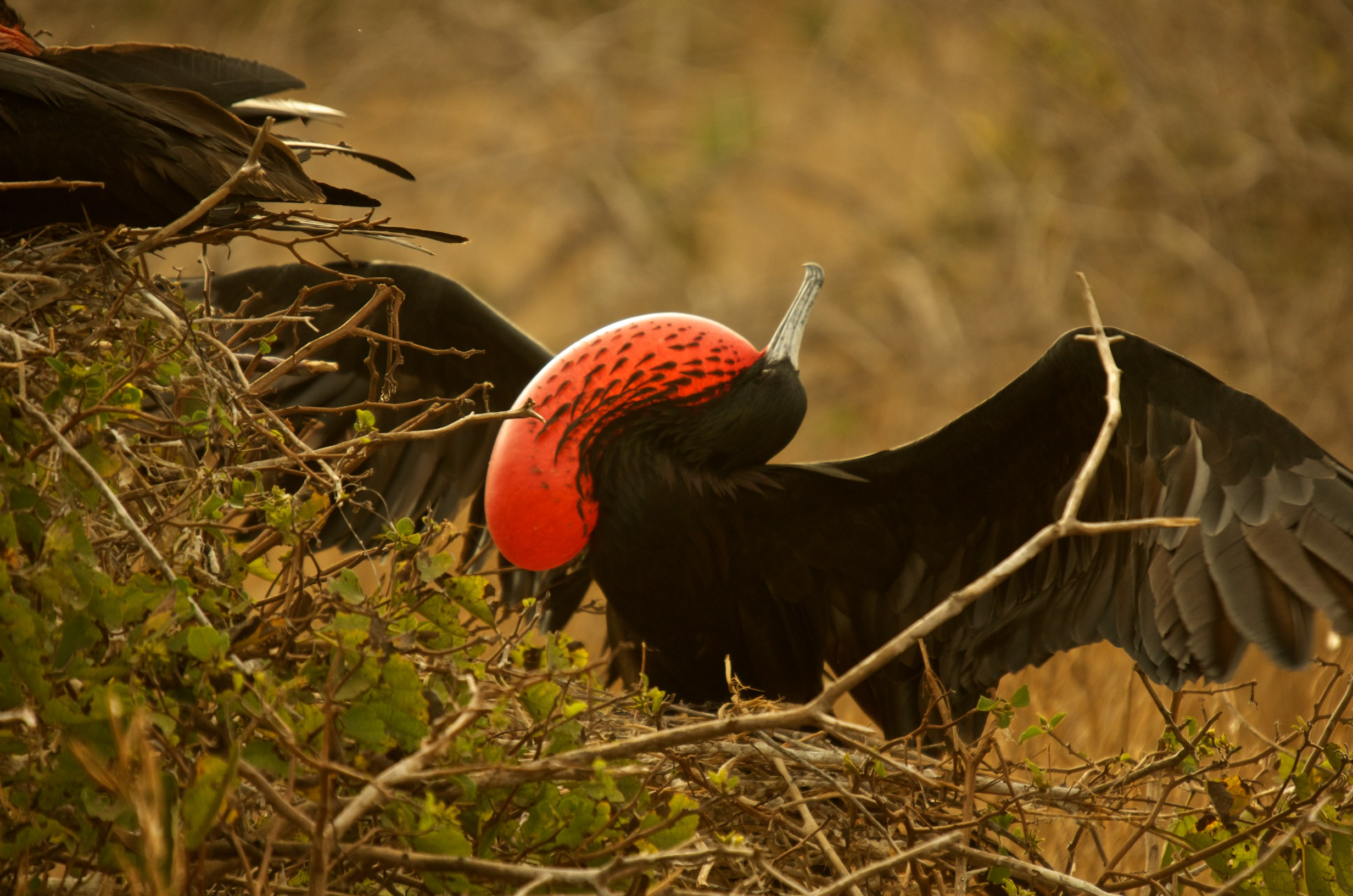
Magnificent frigatebird male breeding display

Frigatebirds typically breed on remote oceanic islands, generally in colonies of up to 5000 birds. Within these colonies, they most often nest in groups of 10 to 30 (or rarely 100) individuals. Breeding can occur at any time of year, often prompted by commencement of the dry season or plentiful food.

Frigatebirds have the most elaborate mating displays of all seabirds. The male birds take up residence in the colony in groups of up to thirty individuals. They display to females flying overhead by pointing their bills upwards, inflating their red throat pouches and vibrating their outstretched wings, showing the lighter wing undersurfaces in the process. They produce a drumming sound by vibrating their bills together and sometimes give a whistling call. The female descends to join a male she has chosen and allows him to take her bill in his. The pair also engages in mutual "head-snaking".

After copulation it is generally the male who gathers sticks and the female that constructs the loosely woven nest. The nest is subsequently covered with (and cemented by) guano. Frigatebirds prefer to nest in trees or bushes, though when these are not available, they will nest on the ground. A single white egg that weighs up to 6–7% of mother's body mass is laid, and is incubated in turns by both birds for 41 to 55 days. The altricial chicks are naked on hatching and develop a white down. They are continuously guarded by the parents for the first 4–6 weeks and are fed on the nest for 5–6 months. Both parents take turns feeding for the first three months, after which the male's attendance trails off, leaving the mother to feed the young for another six to nine months on average. The chicks feed by reaching their heads in their parents' throat and eating the partially regurgitated food. It takes so long to rear a chick that frigatebirds generally breed only every other year.

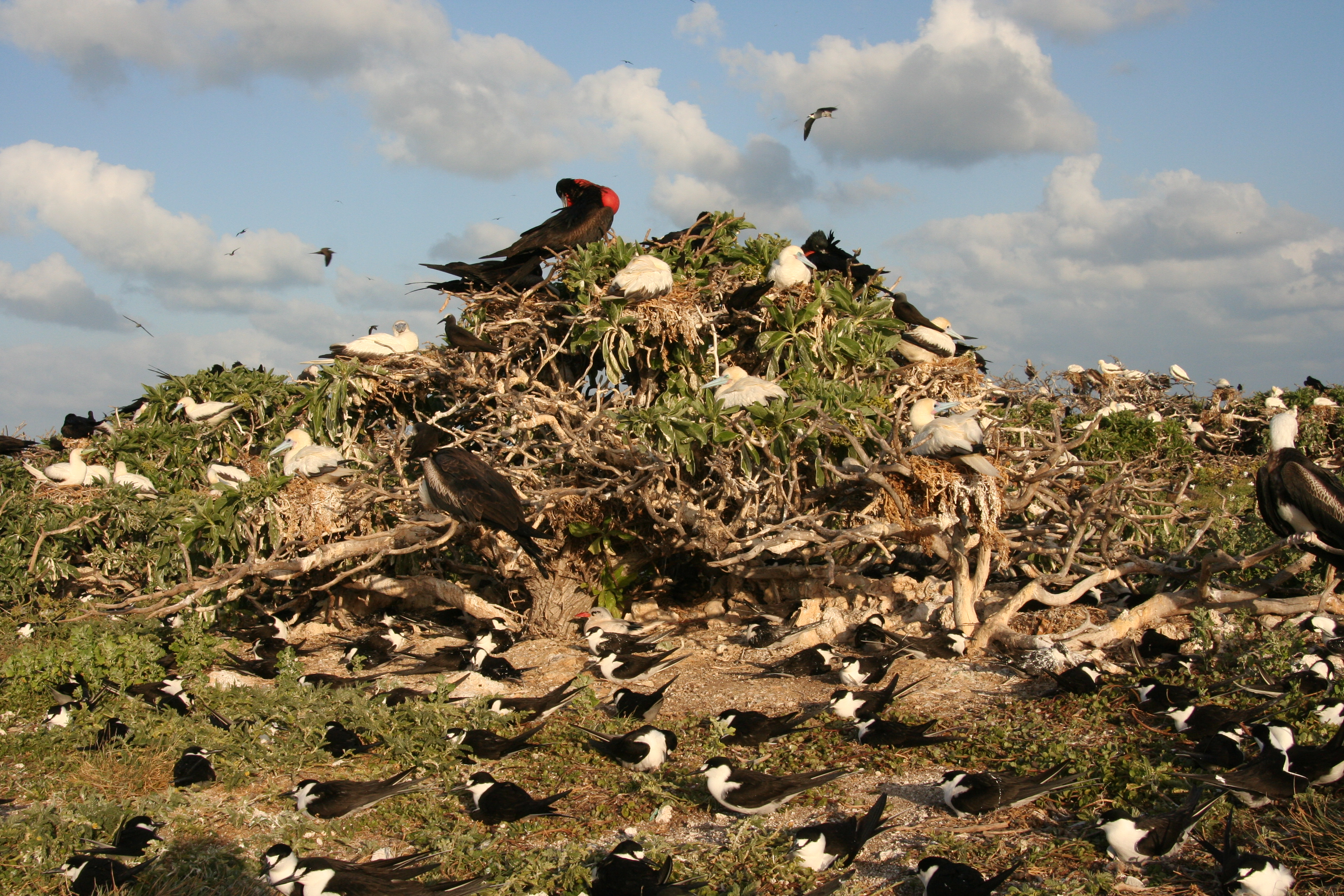
Seabird colony with great frigatebirds, red-tailed tropicbird, red-footed boobies, sooty terns and black noddies, French Frigate Shoals

The duration of parental care in frigatebirds is among the longest for birds, rivalled by only the southern ground hornbill and some large accipitrids. Frigatebirds take many years to reach sexual maturity. A study of great frigatebirds in the Galapagos Islands found that they bred only after they have acquired the full adult plumage. This was attained by female birds when they were eight to nine years of age and by male birds when they were ten to eleven years of age.

=== Feeding ===
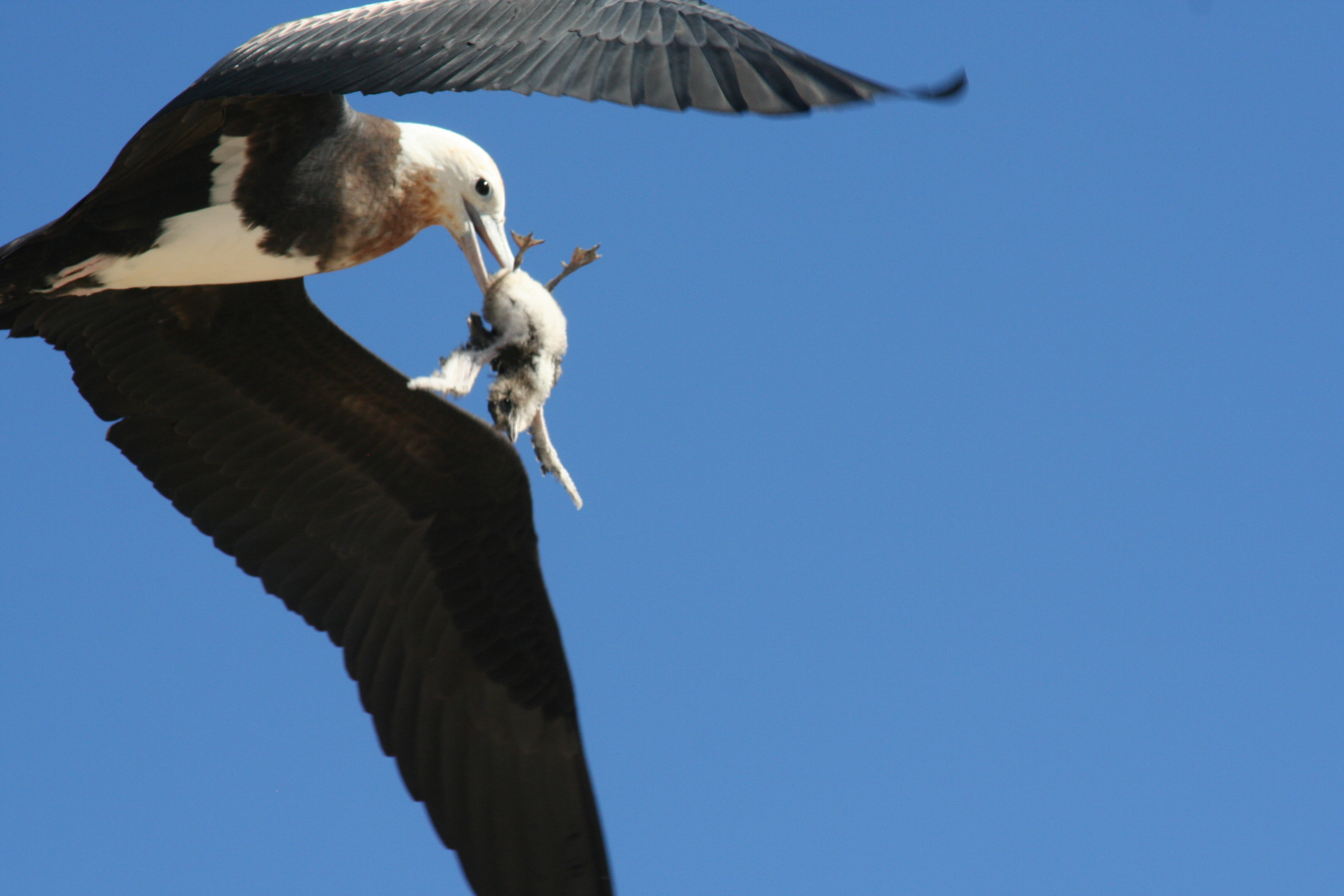
An immature great frigatebird snatching a sooty tern chick

Frigatebirds' feeding habits are pelagic, and they may forage up to 500 km (310 mi) from land. They do not land on the water but snatch prey from the ocean surface using their long, hooked bills. They catch mainly small fish such as flying fish, particularly the genera Exocoetus and Cypselurus, that are driven to the surface by predators such as tuna and dolphinfish, but they will also eat cephalopods, particularly squid. Menhaden of the genus Brevoortia can be an important prey item where common, and jellyfish and larger plankton are also eaten. Frigatebirds have learned to follow fishing vessels and take fish from holding areas. Conversely tuna fishermen fish in areas where they catch sight of frigatebirds due to their association with large marine predators. Frigatebirds also at times prey directly on eggs and young of other seabirds, including boobies, petrels, shearwaters and terns, in particular the sooty tern.

Frigatebirds will rob of their catch other seabirds such as boobies, particularly the red-footed booby, tropicbirds, shearwaters, petrels, terns, gulls and even ospreys, using their speed and manoeuvrability to outrun and harass their victims until they regurgitate their stomach contents. They may either assail their targets after they have caught their food or circle high over seabird colonies waiting for parent birds to return laden with food. Although frigatebirds are renowned for their kleptoparasitic feeding behaviour, kleptoparasitism is not thought to play a significant part of the diet of any species, and is instead a supplement to food obtained by hunting. A study of great frigatebirds stealing from masked boobies estimated that the frigatebirds could obtain at most 40% of the food they needed, and on average obtained only 5%.

Unlike most other seabirds, frigatebirds drink freshwater when they come across it, by swooping down and gulping with their bills.

=== Parasites ===
Frigatebirds are unusual among seabirds in that they often carry blood parasites. Blood-borne protozoa of the genus Haemoproteus have been recovered from four of the five species. Bird lice of the ischnoceran genus Pectinopygus and amblyceran genus Colpocephalum and species Fregatiella aurifasciata have been recovered from magnificent and great frigatebirds of the Galapagos Islands. Frigatebirds tended to have more parasitic lice than did boobies analysed in the same study.

A heavy chick mortality at a large and important colony of the magnificent frigatebird, located on Île du Grand Connétable off French Guiana, was recorded in summer 2005. Chicks showed nodular skin lesions, feather loss and corneal changes, with around half the year's progeny perishing across the colony. An alphaherpesvirus was isolated and provisionally named Fregata magnificens herpesvirus, though it was unclear whether it caused the outbreak or affected birds already suffering malnutrition.

== Status and conservation ==
=== Populations and threats ===
Two of the five species are considered at risk. In 2003, a survey of the four colonies of the critically endangered Christmas Island frigatebirds counted 1200 breeding pairs. As frigatebirds normally breed every other year, the total adult population was estimated to lie between 1800 and 3600 pairs. Larger numbers formerly bred on the island, but the clearance of breeding habitat during World War II and dust pollution from phosphate mining have contributed to the decrease. The population of the vulnerable Ascension frigatebird has been estimated at around 12,500 individuals. The birds formerly bred on Ascension Island itself, but the colonies were exterminated by feral cats introduced in 1815. The birds continued to breed on a rocky outcrop just off the shore of the island. A program conducted between 2002 and 2004 eradicated the feral cats and a few birds have returned to nest on the island.

The other three species are classified by the International Union for Conservation of Nature as being of Least Concern. The populations of all three are large, with that of the magnificent frigatebird thought to be increasing, while that of the great and lesser frigatebird decreasing. Monitoring populations of all species is difficult due to their movements across the open ocean and low reproductivity. The status of the Atlantic populations of the great and lesser frigatebirds are unknown and possibly extinct.

As frigatebirds rely on large marine predators such as tuna for their prey, overfishing threatens to significantly impact on food availability and jeopardise whole populations. As frigatebirds nest in large dense colonies in small areas, they are vulnerable to local disasters that could wipe out the rare species or significantly impact the widespread ones.

=== Hunting ===
In Nauru, catching frigatebirds was an important tradition still practised to some degree. Donald W. Buden writes: "Birds typically are captured by slinging the weighted end of a coil of line in front of an approaching bird attracted to previously captured birds used as decoys. In a successful toss, the line becomes entangled about the bird's wing and bringing [sic] it to ground." Marine birds including frigatebirds were once harvested for food on Christmas Island, but this practice ceased in the late 1970s. Eggs and young of magnificent frigatebirds were taken and eaten in the Caribbean. Great frigatebirds were eaten in the Hawaiian Islands and their feathers used for decoration.

== Cultural significance ==
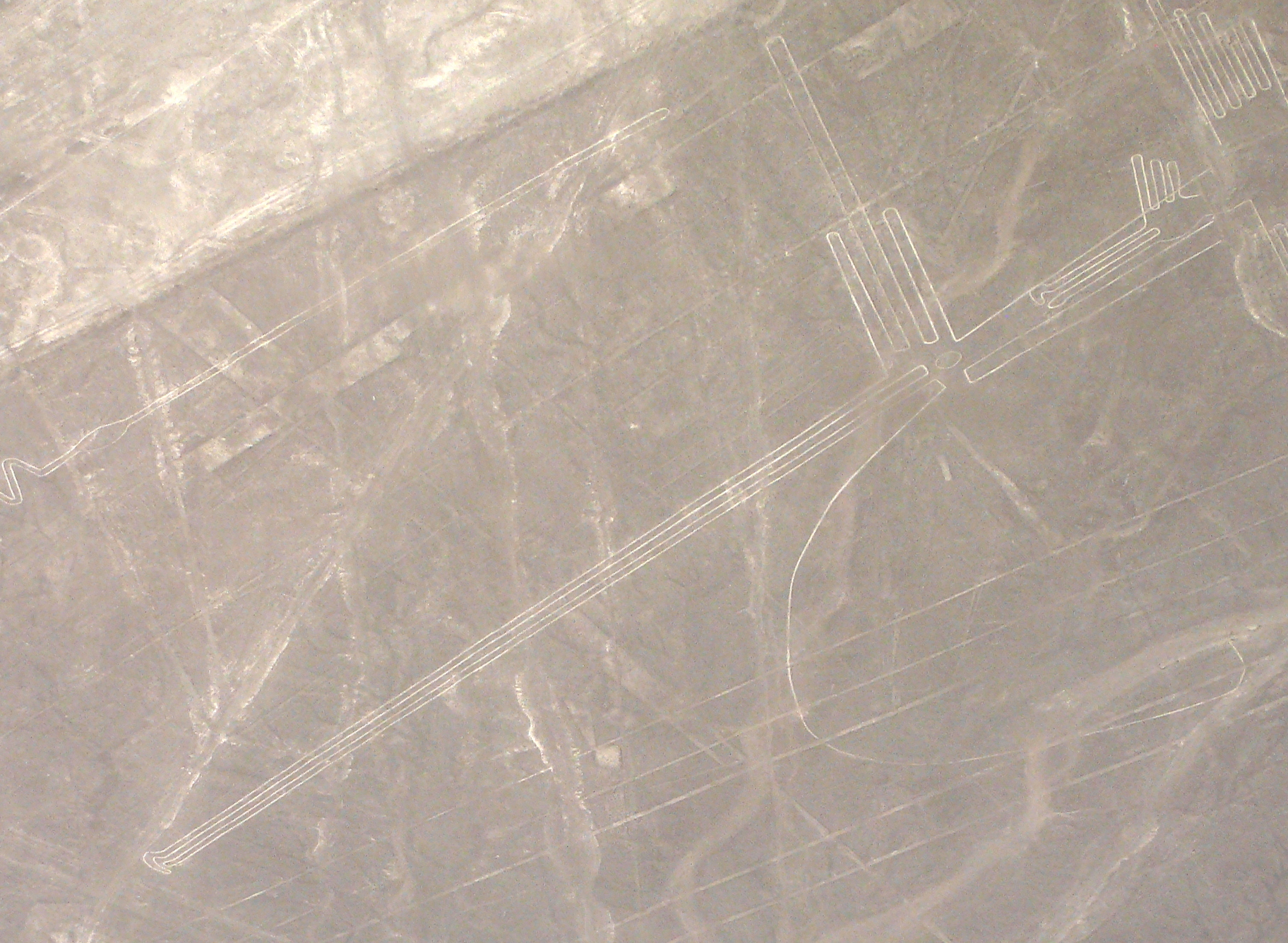
The frigate bird painted in the Nazca desert.

Barbuda Council Flag

The frigate bird appears on the national Flag of Kiribati. The design is based on its former colonial Gilbert and Ellice Islands coat of arms. The bird also appears on the flag of Barbuda, and is the national bird of Antigua and Barbuda.

There are anecdotal reports of tame frigatebirds being kept across Polynesia and Micronesia in the Pacific. A bird that had come from one island and had been taken elsewhere could be reliably trusted to return to its original home, hence would be used as a speedy way to relay a message there. There is evidence of this practice taking place in the Gilbert Islands and Tuvalu.

The great frigatebird was venerated by the Rapa Nui people on Easter Island; carvings of the birdman Tangata manu depict him with the characteristic hooked beak and throat pouch. Its incorporation into local ceremonies suggests that the now-vanished species was extant there between the 1800s and 1860s.

Maritime folklore around the time of European contact with the Americas held that frigatebirds were birds of good omen as their presence meant land was near.

== See also ==
- List of birds by flight speed
