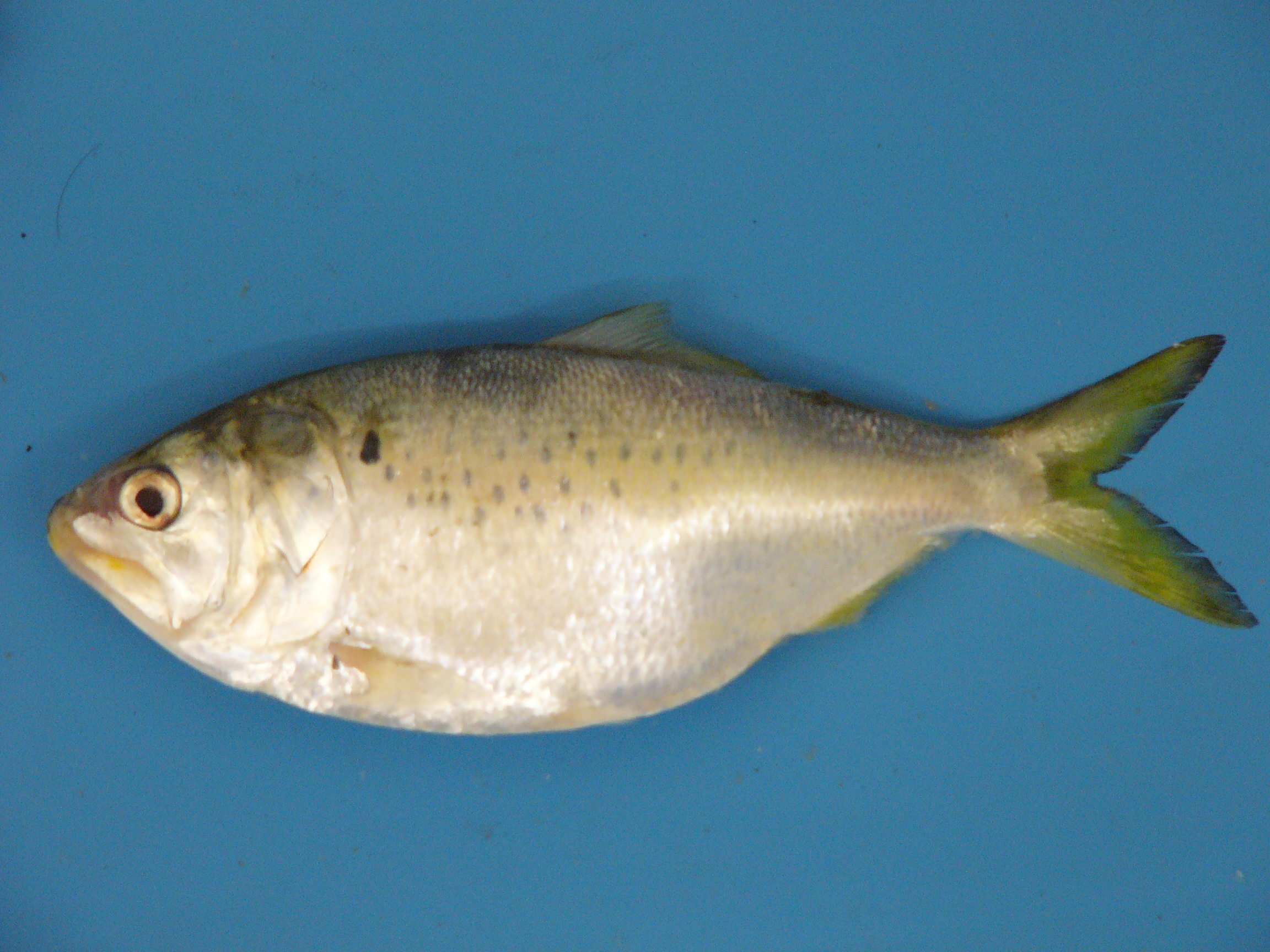
- Gulf menhaden (Brevoortia patronus), captured in Galveston Bay, TX

Conservation status
- Least Concern (IUCN 3.1)

Scientific classification
- Kingdom: Animalia
- Phylum: Chordata
- Class: Actinopterygii
- Division: Teleostei
- Order: Clupeiformes
- Family: Alosidae
- Genus: Brevoortia
- Species: B. patronus

Binomial name
- Brevoortia patronus Goode, 1878

= Gulf menhaden =

Species of fish

The Gulf menhaden (Brevoortia patronus) is a small marine filter-feeding fish belonging to the family Alosidae. The range of Gulf menhaden encompasses the entirety of the Gulf of Mexico nearshore waters, with the exception of the extreme eastern Yucatan and western Cuba. Evidence from morphology and DNA analyses suggest that the Gulf menhaden is the Gulf of Mexico complement to the Atlantic menhaden (Brevoortia tyrannus). Both of these menhaden species support large commercial reduction fisheries, with Gulf menhaden supporting the second largest fishery, by weight, in the United States.

== Range and distribution ==
The Gulf menhaden resides throughout the Gulf of Mexico, but its distribution is patchy. The center of distribution of the species appears to be the northwest/northcentral Gulf, particularly in Louisiana and Texas where populations are very large and numerous. In the southern Gulf of Mexico, the range of Gulf menhaden overlaps that of the closely related finescale menhaden (Brevoortia gunteri), and there is evidence for resource partitioning (a process whereby closely related species occurring in close proximity results in subtle differences in ecological niches) between these species. In the eastern Gulf, the range of Gulf menhaden overlaps that of the yellowfin menhaden (Brevoortia smithi), and hybridization between these species has been demonstrated using morphological and DNA evidence. Gulf menhaden also may have a presence on the southern Atlantic coast of Florida, although this finding is based primarily upon DNA evidence.

== General biology ==
Gulf menhaden are commonly eight inches in length but can reach 12 inches. Gulf menhaden are a dull silver with a greenish back. Like their Atlantic counterpart, Gulf menhaden have a prominent black spot found behind the gill cover followed by a row of smaller spots.

=== Diet ===
Gulf menhaden are filter feeders, meaning that they collect food by filtering water through modifications of the branchial apparatus (gill or branchial arches and gill rakers). Like Atlantic menhaden, Gulf menhaden's diet depends on the size of their gill rakers, which change as menhaden age. Larval gulf menhaden feed primary on zooplankton because the rakers are not well developed. The juveniles, which generally correspond to when they are under the age of one, feed on phytoplankton. As they age and their gill rakers fully develop, menhaden shift their diet to primarily consume zooplankton.

=== Life cycle ===
Spawning occurs offshore in winter (October–March). Eggs and larvae are pelagic and are carried into estuarine nursery areas via prevailing currents. As a result, migration at this stage can be lengthy, and populations of Gulf menhaden throughout the Gulf of Mexico are generally thought to comprise a single genetic stock.

=== Specialist hearing ===
While the hearing of most fishes is limited in frequency to less than 1 kHz, gulf menhaden demonstrate an unusual ability to detect very high frequency sound (ultrasound) above 50 kHz.

== Relationship with humans ==
=== Commercial fishery ===
Global capture production of Gulf menhaden (Brevoortia patronus) in thousand tonnes from 1950 to 2022, as reported by the FAO

The Gulf menhaden fishery is one of the largest in the United States. In 2013, the fishery supported four of the nation's top ten ports by volume of landings. Gulf menhaden are harvested primarily for fish meal and fish oil based products. A much smaller number of menhaden are caught for use as bait. In addition to being one of the largest fisheries in the US, the Gulf menhaden fishery has also been recognized internationally for its sustainability.

Friend of the Sea, an international seafood sustainability certification program, has recognized both the Atlantic menhaden and Gulf menhaden fisheries as sustainable. This is due to what they say is the healthy status of the stock as well as the fishery's low levels of bycatch, which it achieves with the use of purse seine nets.

=== Recreational fishery ===
The Gulf menhaden is an important bait fish for recreational anglers.

=== Management ===
Gulf menhaden are managed by an interstate compact called the Gulf States Marine Fisheries Commission (GSMFC). According to the most recent 2013 stock assessment by the GSMFC, Gulf menhaden are "neither overfished nor experiencing overfishing." In addition, according to the GSMFC, "the Gulf menhaden fishery is probably the most closely monitored and managed fishery in the Gulf of Mexico." An example of the fishery's monitoring is the Gulf of Mexico purse seine fishery's participation in NOAA's Southeast Fisheries Observer Program since 2011. Specifically, the Menhaden Advisory Committee (MAC) is the GSMFC subcommittee that oversees menhaden management.

=== Dead zones ===
According to the GSMFC: "Menhaden do not have the capacity to reduce unwanted phytoplankton blooms that arise from manmade sources, primarily because they eat mostly zooplankton. In addition, menhaden excrete large amounts of ammonia (a nitrogenous product), contributing to an already high nitrogen load." Also, the commercial menhaden fishery only targets adult menhaden, which consume zooplankton, not juvenile menhaden, which do consume phytoplankton
