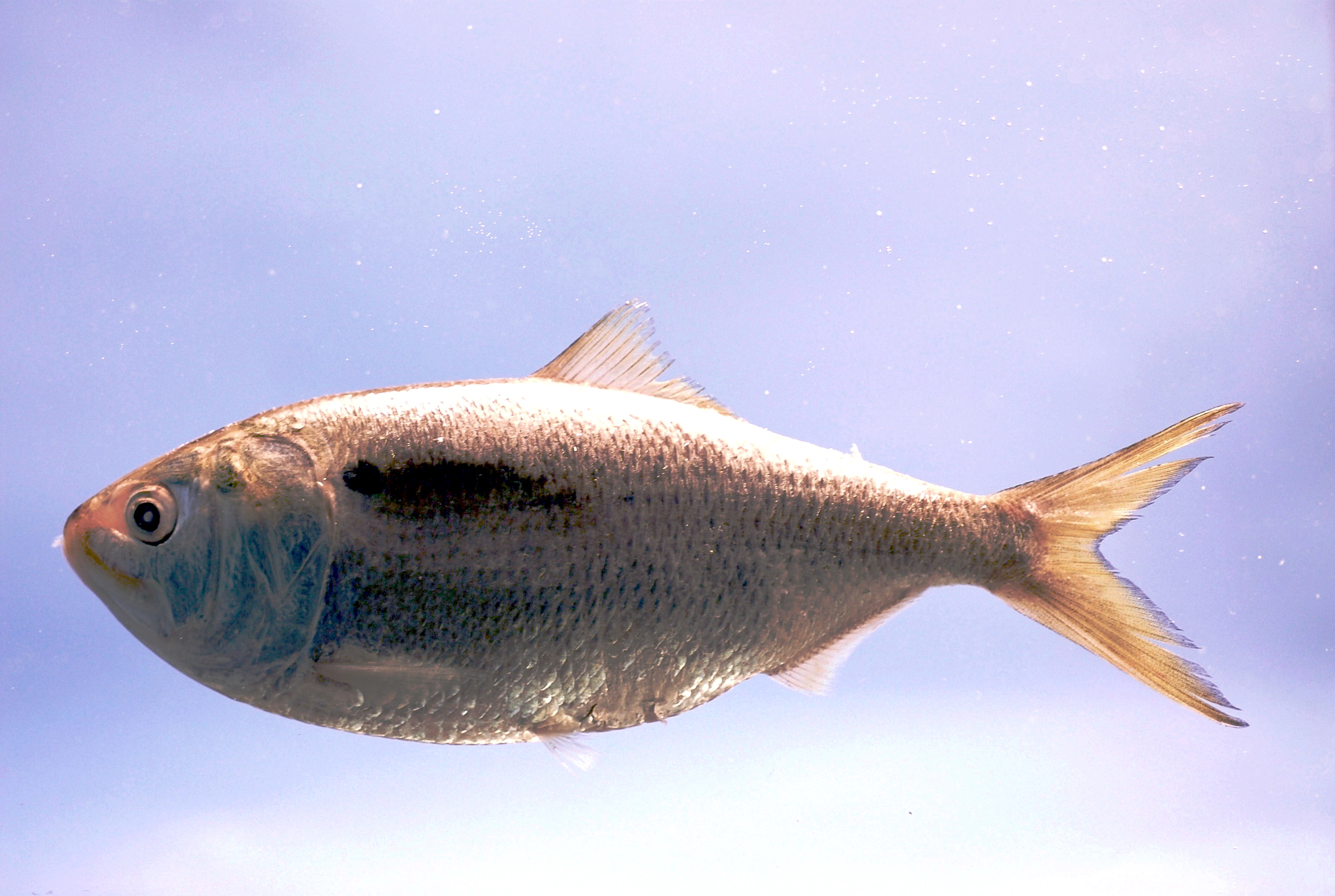
- Brevoortia patronus

Scientific classification
- Kingdom: Animalia
- Phylum: Chordata
- Class: Actinopterygii
- Division: Teleostei
- Superorder: Clupeomorpha
- Order: Clupeiformes

Groups included
- Genus Brevoortia T. N. Gill, 1861; Genus Ethmidium W. F. Thompson, 1916

Cladistically included but traditionally excluded taxa
- all other genera in the families Clupeidae and Alosidae

= Menhaden =

Informal name for some fishes (genera Brevoortia and Ethmidium)

Menhaden

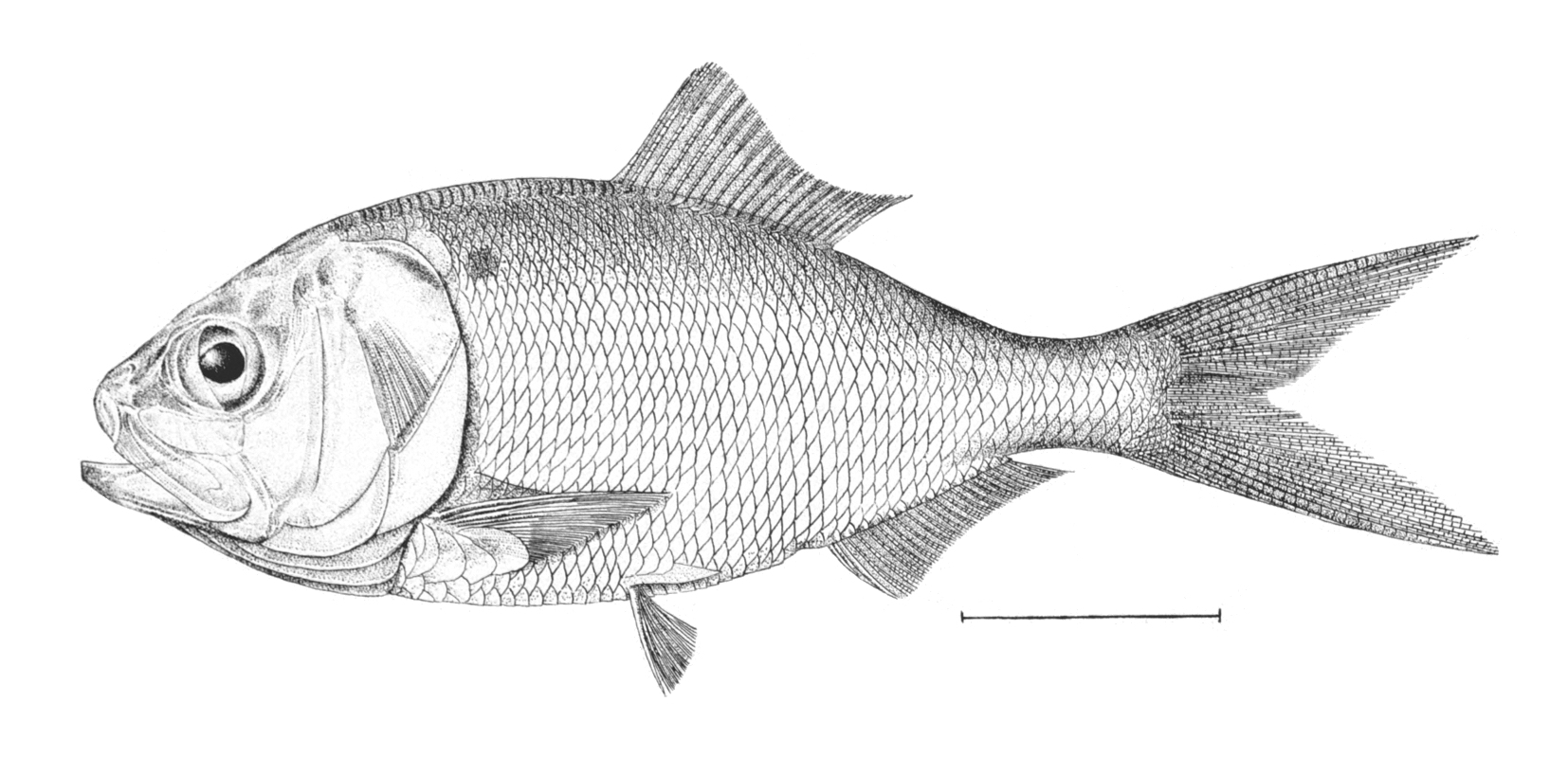
Gulf menhaden, Brevoortia patronus

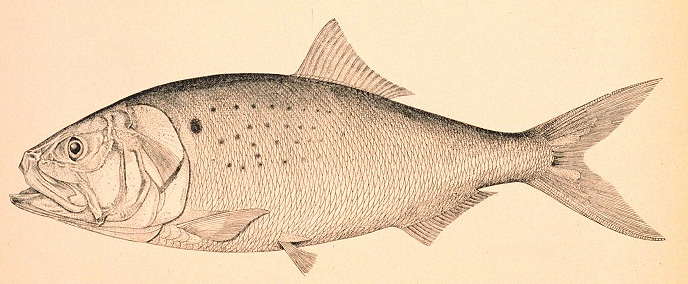
Atlantic menhaden, Brevoortia tyrannus

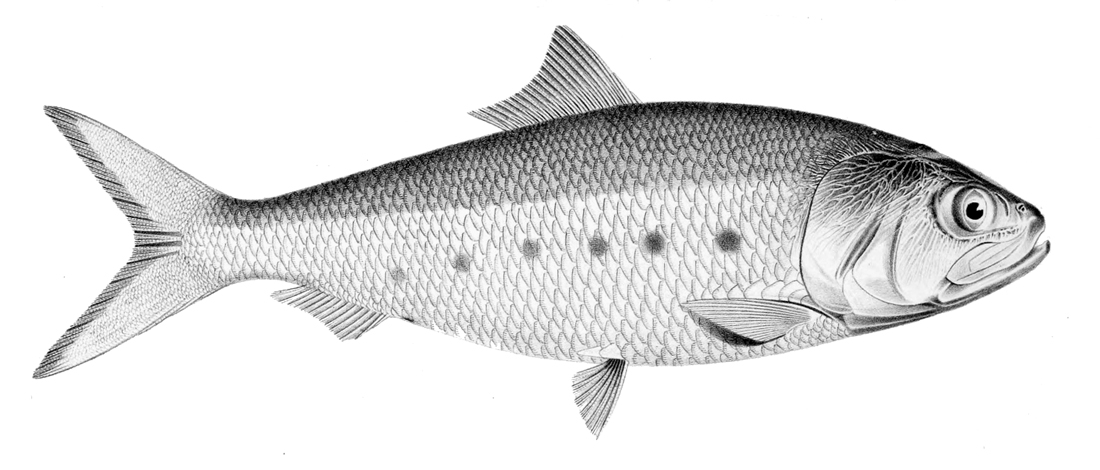
Pacific menhaden, Ethmidium maculatum

Menhaden, (Note: /ˌmɛnˈheɪdən/, /mənˈheɪdən/) also known as mossbunker or bunker, are forage fish of the genera Brevoortia and Ethmidium, two genera of marine fish in the order Clupeiformes. From certain ecological and economic viewpoints, menhaden have been described as "the most important fish in the sea".

== Description ==
Menhaden are flat and have soft flesh and a deeply forked tail. They rarely exceed 15 inches (38 cm) in length, and have a varied weight range. Gulf menhaden and Atlantic menhaden are small oily-fleshed fish, bright silver, and characterized by a series of smaller spots behind the main humeral spot. They tend to have larger scales than yellowfin menhaden and finescale menhaden. In addition, yellowfin menhaden tail rays are a bright yellow in contrast to those of the Atlantic menhaden.

== Taxonomy ==
Recent taxonomic work using DNA comparisons have organized the North American menhadens into large-scaled (Gulf and Atlantic menhaden) and small-scaled (Finescale and Yellowfin menhaden) designations.

The menhaden consist of two genera and seven species:

- Genus Brevoortia T. N. Gill, 1861
  - Large-scaled
    - Brevoortia aurea (Spix & Agassiz, 1829) (Brazilian menhaden)
    - Brevoortia patronus Goode, 1878 (Gulf menhaden)
    - Brevoortia pectinata (Jenyns, 1842) (Argentine menhaden)
    - Brevoortia tyrannus (Latrobe, 1802) (Atlantic menhaden)
  - Small-scaled
    - Brevoortia gunteri Hildebrand, 1948 (Finescale menhaden)
    - Brevoortia smithi Hildebrand, 1941 (Yellowfin menhaden)
- Genus Ethmidium W. F. Thompson, 1916
  - Ethmidium maculatum (Valenciennes, 1847) (Pacific menhaden)

== Distribution ==
- Argentine menhaden and Brazilian menhaden range from Bahía Blanca, Argentina to Rio de Janeiro state, Brazil
- Finescale menhaden range from the Yucatán to Louisiana.
- Yellowfin menhaden range from Louisiana to Virginia.
- Gulf menhaden range from the Yucatán Peninsula, Mexico, to Tampa Bay, Florida.
- Atlantic menhaden range from Jupiter Inlet, Florida, to Nova Scotia; Atlantic menhaden seasonally migrate along the coast; in June, mature adults typically are in the northern portion of the coastline with sub-adults and juveniles located in the southern portion.
- The various species of menhaden occur anywhere from estuarine waters outward to the continental shelf; menhaden grow in less saline waters of estuaries and may be found in bays and lagoons, as well as at river mouths; adults appear to prefer water temperatures near 18 °C.

== Ecology ==
Menhaden are filter feeders that travel in large, slow-moving, and tightly packed schools with open mouths. Filter feeders typically take into their open mouths "materials in the same proportions as they occur in ambient waters". Menhaden have two main sources of food: phytoplankton and zooplankton. A menhaden's diet varies considerably over the course of its lifetime, and is directly related to its size. The smallest menhaden, typically those under one year old, eat primarily phytoplankton. After that age, adult menhaden gradually shift to a diet comprised almost exclusively of zooplankton.

Menhaden are omnivorous filter feeders, feeding by straining plankton and algae from water. Along with oysters, which filter water on the seabed, menhaden play a key role in the food chain in estuaries and bays. Atlantic menhaden are an important link between plankton and upper level predators. Because of their filter feeding abilities, "menhaden consume and redistribute a significant amount of energy within and between the Chesapeake Bay and other estuaries, and the coastal ocean." Because they play this role, and their abundance, menhaden are an invaluable prey species for many predatory fish, such as striped bass, bluefish, mackerel, flounder, tuna, drums, and sharks. They are also a very important food source for many birds, including egrets, ospreys, seagulls, northern gannets, pelicans, and herons. Conservationists believe osprey chicks' poor survival rates during the 2026 breeding season are directly related to the sudden decline in Atlantic menhaden.

In 2012, the Atlantic States Marine Fisheries Commission declared that the Atlantic menhaden was depleted due to overfishing. The decision was driven by issues with water quality in the Chesapeake Bay and failing efforts to re-introduce predator species, due to lack of menhaden on which they could feed.

Menhaden are crucial not only because of their keystone species-status in the food web, but also because of their ecological services. The way menhaden filter feed on phytoplankton helps to mitigate toxic algal blooms. These algal blooms, which are often detrimental to a number of fish, bird, and marine mammal species, create hypoxic conditions. The phytoplankton being preyed upon are photosynthetic organisms, converting sunlight into energy which is then transferred to menhaden and then to bigger species of fish or other larger marine organisms such as birds or mammals. The consequence of this behavior is that if menhaden are eliminated or significantly decreased, there are limited means of energy transfer among trophic levels – making menhaden a true keystone species with ecological services that are invaluable to humans.

=== Habitat ===
Menhaden are a pelagic schooling fish that migrate inshore during the summer and off-shore in the winter months. The juvenile and larval menhaden migrate to shore and inland waterways through currents during summer months to grow while feeding on the phytoplankton and eventually zooplankton once they have matured. Commercially caught menhaden have been recorded in waters of around 5 to 24 ‰, as well as in hypersaline waters around 60 ‰.

=== Reproduction ===
Menhaden reproduce in open oceans externally, however, the female does not carry eggs with them during the process as they are released into the water column at the planktonic level as gametes and sperm. Currently, functional hermaphroditism is unknown to the species and identification of sex of the individual organism cannot be determined externally due to the lack of accessory reproductive organs. These fish breed during the winter months through December to March and the eggs and juveniles navigate towards estuaries and inland waterways through tides and currents.

== Human use ==
Menhaden are not used directly for food. They are processed into fish oil and fish meal that are used as food ingredients, animal feed, and dietary supplements. The flesh has a high omega-3 fat content. Fish oil made from menhaden also is used as a raw material for products such as lipstick.

=== Fisheries ===
According to the Virginia Institute of Marine Science (VIMS), there are two established commercial fisheries for menhaden. The first is known as a reduction fishery. The second is known as a bait fishery, which harvests menhaden for the use of both commercial and recreational fishermen. Commercial fishermen, especially crabbers in the Chesapeake Bay area, use menhaden to bait their traps or hooks. The recreational fisherman use ground menhaden chum as a fish attractant, and whole fish as bait. The total harvest is approximately 500 million fish per year. Atlantic menhaden are harvested using purse seines.

Omega Protein – a reduction fishery company with operations in the northwest Atlantic and the Gulf of Mexico – takes 90% of the total menhaden harvest in the United States. In October 2005, the Atlantic States Marine Fisheries Commission (ASMFC) approved an addendum to Amendment 1 of the Interstate Fishery Management Plan for Atlantic Menhaden, which "established a five-year annual cap on reduction fishery landings in the Chesapeake Bay", imposing a limit on reduction fishery operations for 2006–2010. In November 2006, that cap was established at 109,020 metric tons; this cap remained in place until 2013.

In December 2012, in the face of the depletion of Atlantic menhaden, the ASMFC implemented another cap, effective in 2013 and 2014, for the Chesapeake Bay, this time at 87,216 metric tons, as well as a total allowable catch (TAC) of the species of 170,800 metric tons, a 20% reduction from the 2009–2011 average. The TAC was subsequently raised for 2015 and 2016 to 187,880 metric tons. The cap in the Chesapeake Bay was further lowered in November 2017 to 51,000 metric tons, but this came alongside a higher TAC of 216,000 metric tons. Omega Protein has been openly critical of these caps.

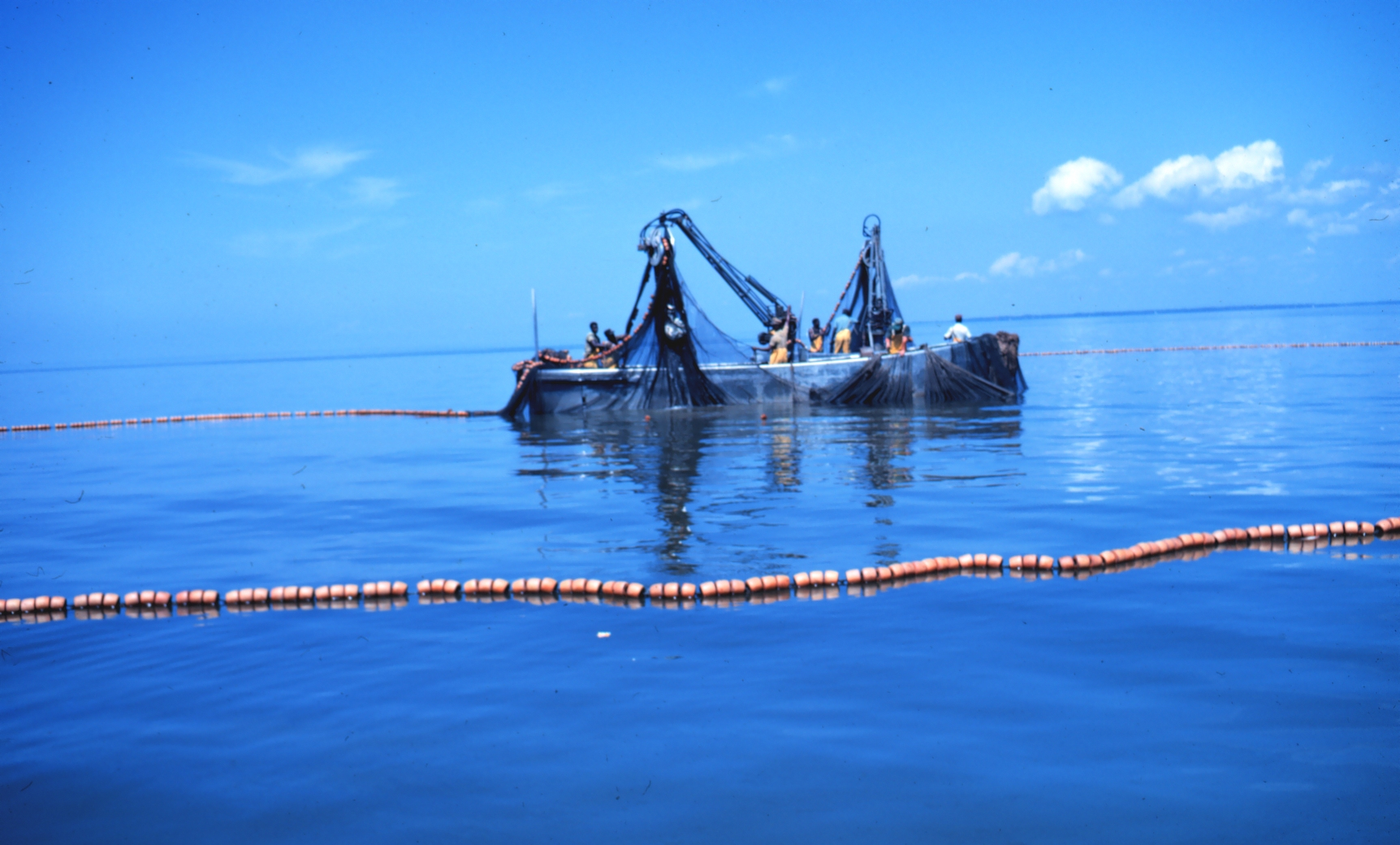
Purse seine boats encircling a school of menhaden

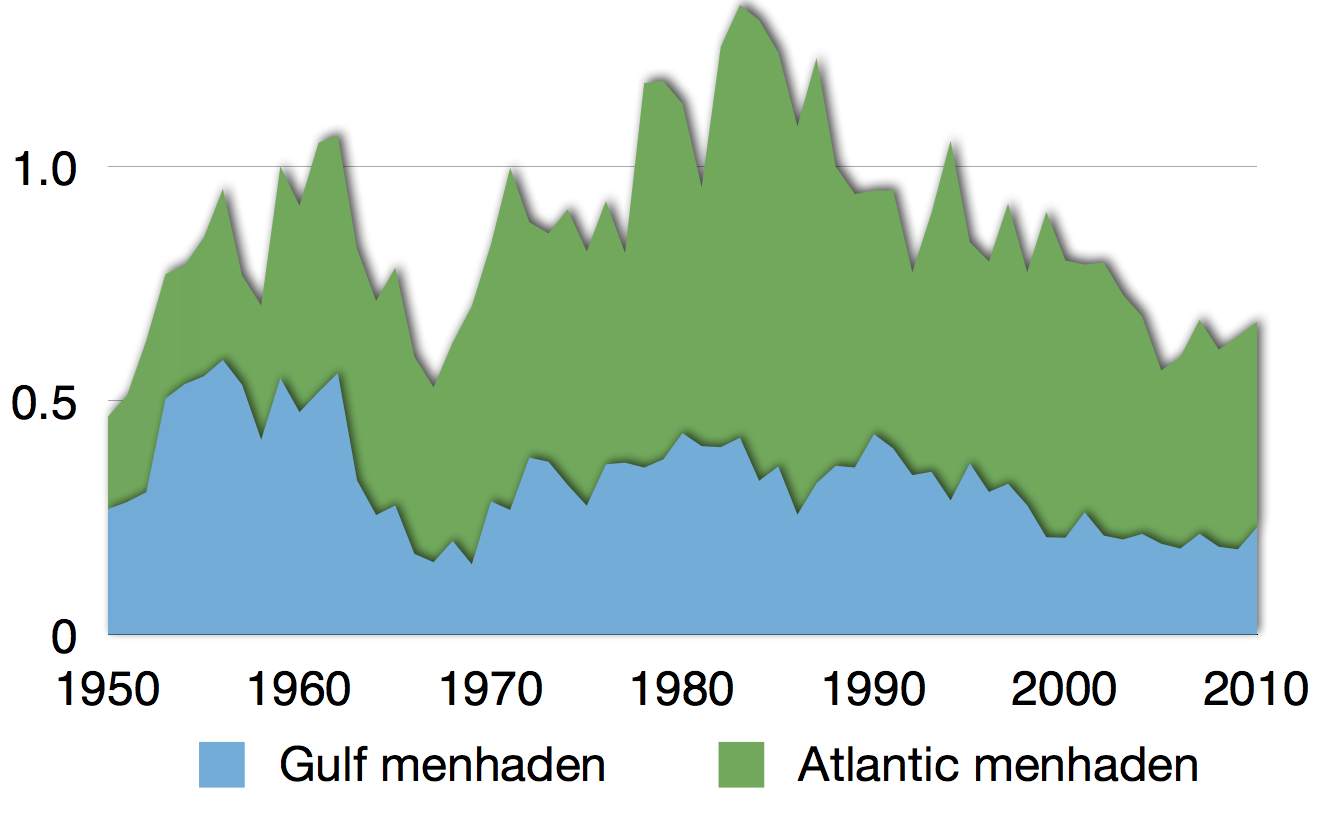
Global commercial capture of menhaden in million tonnes 1950–2010

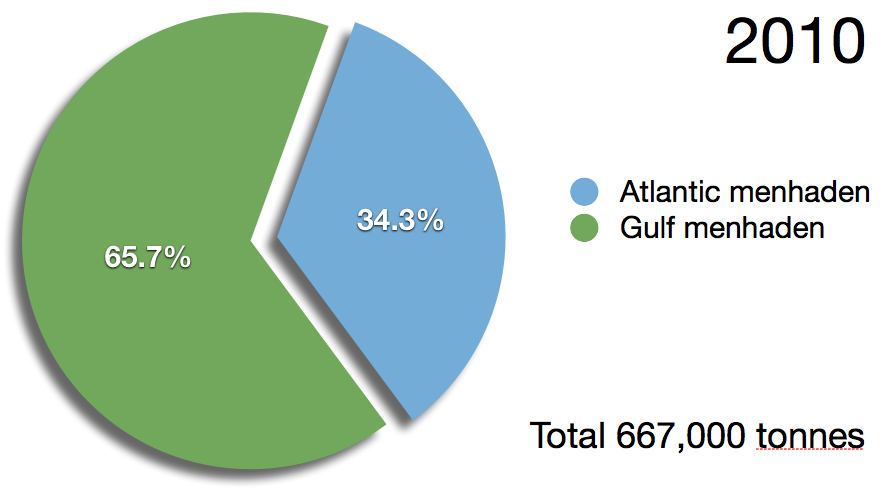
Capture of menhaden in 2010 reported by the FAO

==== Uses for menhaden ====
Menhaden oil is high in omega-3 fatty acids. As a supplement to the human diet, omega-3 fatty acids can lower blood pressure, prevent abnormal heart rhythms, reduce the chance of a heart attack or stroke, and confer other health benefits.

Menhaden is also used in animal feed and fertilizer. Menhaden oil in chicken feed may induce fatty liver disease in reproductive hens, which appear to be more susceptible to the condition than roosters fed the same diet. Guinea pigs given menhaden oil in feed were shown to have a longer life span.

==== Risks of overfishing ====
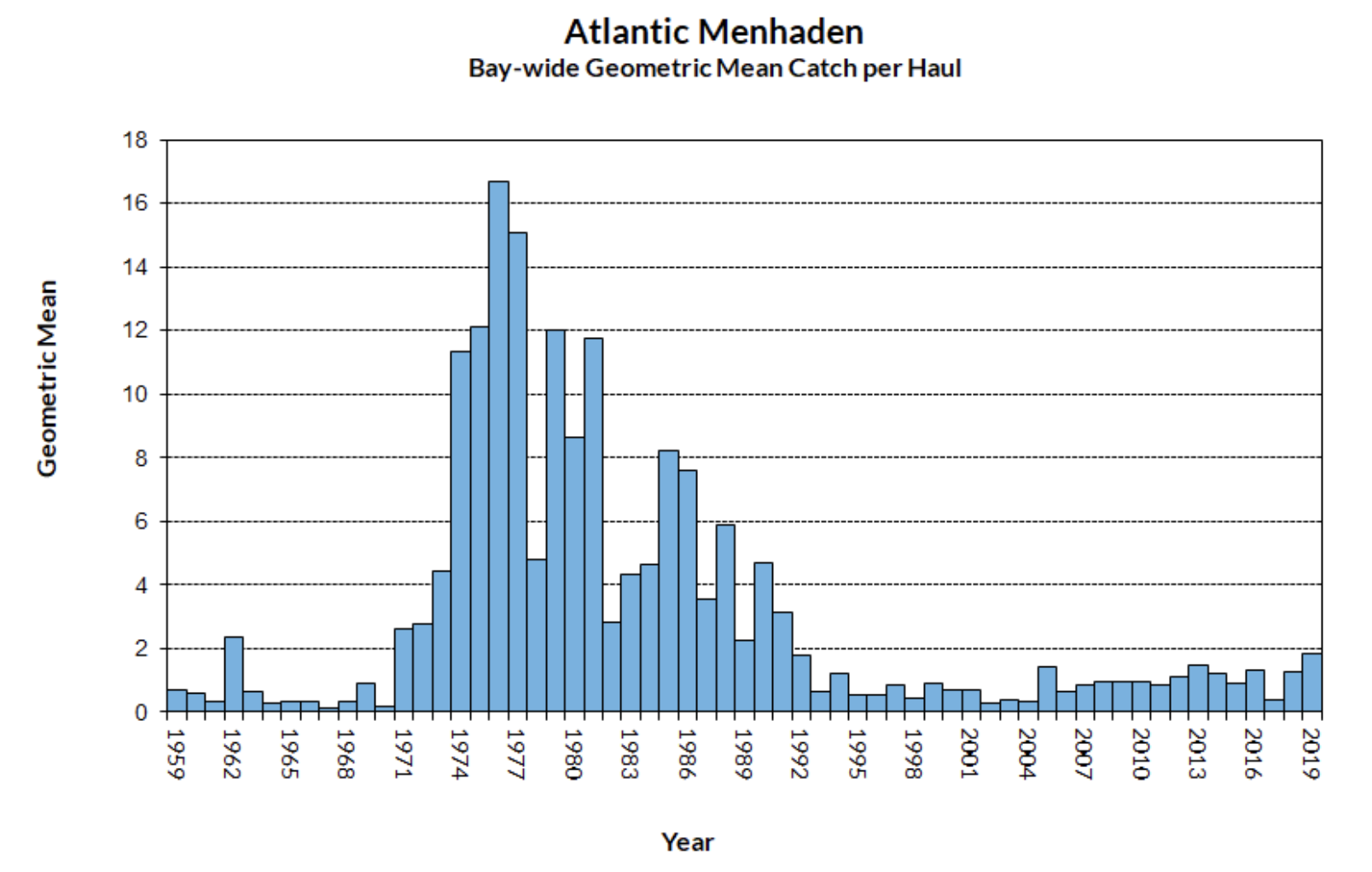
Bay-wide Geometric Mean Catch per Haul in the Chesapeake Bay of Atlantic Menhaden reported by the Chesapeake Bay Foundation in 2019.

According to the Chesapeake Bay Foundation, menhaden are the most important fish in the Bay. This is because they are a food source for many commercially important species like striped bass. They also manage the algal bloom occurrences in the Bay because they eat phytoplankton. Decreases in menhaden populations could also leave striped bass vulnerable to disease. In the past 20 years, the number of juvenile menhaden produced in the Chesapeake Bay have been decreasing (Refer to Atlantic Menhaden Graph on bay-wide mean catch per haul).

This is believed to be due to the overfishing of menhaden for their fish oil. This could seriously disrupt the food chain. In response, the Atlantic States Marine Fisheries Commission (ASMFC) put a cap on the Atlantic menhaden harvest in October 2020. This 10% cut to the harvest is the first to ever be seen for menhaden coast-wide. It also was the first vote to consider benchmarks known as "ecological reference points". This allows managers to account for a species role in the food chain when setting catch limits. This is different from the "single-species stock assessments" that were previously used which only accounted for the demand from the fishing industry rather than the demand from the food web. This cut to the harvest established a quota of 194,400 metric tons of menhaden for the 2021–2022 fishing season. It is the hope that this cut will allow menhaden to fulfill their role in the ecosystem while keeping the commercial fishery alive.

== Cultural significance ==
After menhaden had been identified as a valuable alternative to whale oil in the 1870s, the menhaden fishery on the Chesapeake was worked by crews of predominantly African-American men on open boats hauling purse seines. The men employed sea chanties to help synchronize the hauling of the nets. These chanties pulled from West African, blues, and gospel sources and created a uniquely African American culture of chanty singing. By the late 1950s, hydraulic winches replaced the large crews of manual haulers, and the menhaden chanty tradition declined.

== Etymology ==
The word menhaden comes from an Algonquian word akin to Narragansett munnawhatteaûg, derived from munnohquohteau ("he fertilizes"), referring to their use of the fish as fertilizer; the synonym poghaden is likewise from an Algonquian word, and in the course of the two words being loaned into English, mutual influence probably steered the commonality of their haden syllables. Regarding use as fertilizer, it is generally thought that Pilgrims were advised by Tisquantum (also known as Squanto) to plant menhaden with their crops.

In southeastern South America, menhaden are called "savelhas" or "saracas" in Portuguese, Spanish, or macaronic blends thereof.
