= Zéphirin Gerbe =

French naturalist (1810–1890)

Jean-Joseph Zéphirin Gerbe (21 December 1810 in Bras – 26 June 1890 in Bras) was a French naturalist. He was the first to discover the pattern of wing taxis, the absence (diastataxis) or presence (eutaxy) of the fifth secondary in birds.

He was co-author of Ornithologie européenne, ou Catalogue analytique et raisonné des oiseaux observés en Europe with countryman Côme-Damien Degland (second edition, 1867). He also published a French translation of Alfred Brehm's Illustrirtes Thierleben with the title La vie des animaux illustrée : description populaire du règne animal (4 volumes).

Species he described include Gerbe's vole.

== Selected works ==
- Mélanges zoologiques. Notices et observations sur quelques vertébrés nouveaux pour la faune de la Provence, (1852).
- Ornithologie européenne, ou Catalogue descriptif, analytique et raisonné des oiseaux observés en Europe; with C. D. Degland, (1867).
- Les Oiseaux décrits et figurés d'après la classification de Georges Cuvier, mise au courant des progrès de la science, (1869).
- Étude comparative de quelques caractères du Campagnol ibérien et du Campagnol incertain, (1879).
