= Côme-Damien Degland =

Côme-Damien Degland (6 July 1787 – 1 January 1856, Lille) was a French medical doctor and zoologist.

== Biography ==
Born in Armentières, Degland lived in Lille for most of his life, where he was the chief of the Hôpital Saint-Sauveur until his death. He participated in the founding of the Lille Natural History Museum, and his purchases formed much of its original zoological collection. In 1821, he published a catalogue of the museum's beetles, followed by a two-volume catalogue of the birds of France and Europe in 1849. He was co-author, with Zéphirin Gerbe, of Ornithologie européenne, ou, Catalogue descriptif, analytique et raisonné des oiseaux observés en Europe (second edition, 1867).

The white-winged scoter (Melanitta deglandi) bird species is named after Degland.
