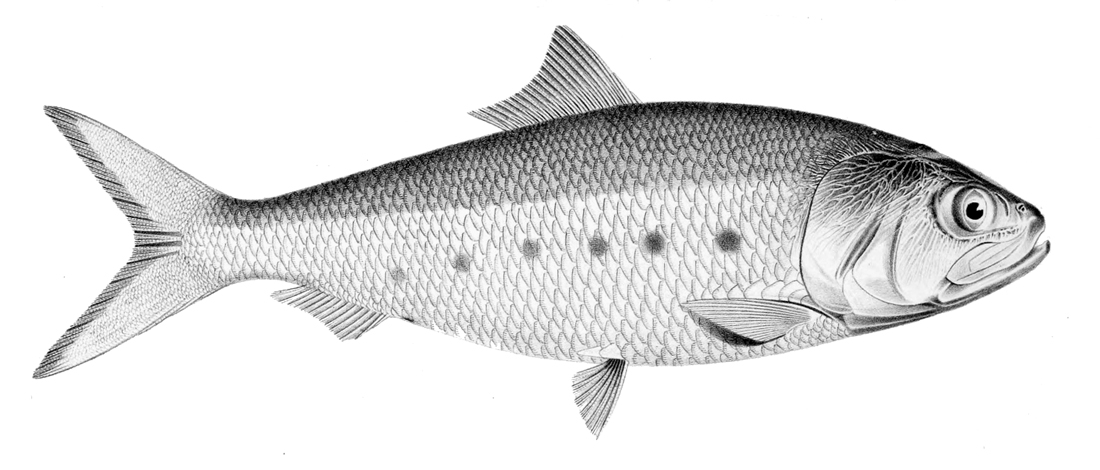

Conservation status
- Data Deficient (IUCN 3.1)

Scientific classification
- Kingdom: Animalia
- Phylum: Chordata
- Class: Actinopterygii
- Division: Teleostei
- Order: Clupeiformes
- Family: Alosidae
- Genus: Ethmidium; W. F. Thompson, 1916
- Species: E. maculatum

Binomial name
- Ethmidium maculatum (Valenciennes, 1847)

Synonyms
- Alausa maculata Valenciennes, 1847; Brevoortia maculata (Valenciennes, 1847); Clupea maculata (Valenciennes, 1847); Alausa coerulea Valenciennes, 1847; Clupea notacanthus Günther, 1868; Clupea notacanthoides Steindachner, 1869; Ethmidium chilcae Hildebrand, 1946; Brevoortia maculata chilcae (Hildebrand, 1946)

= Ethmidium =

Species of fish

Ethmidium is a monospecific genus of marine ray-finned fish belonging to the family Alosidae, the shads and menhadens. The only species in the genus is Ethmidium maculatum, the Pacific menhaden, a species found along the Pacific coast of South America off Peru and Chile.
