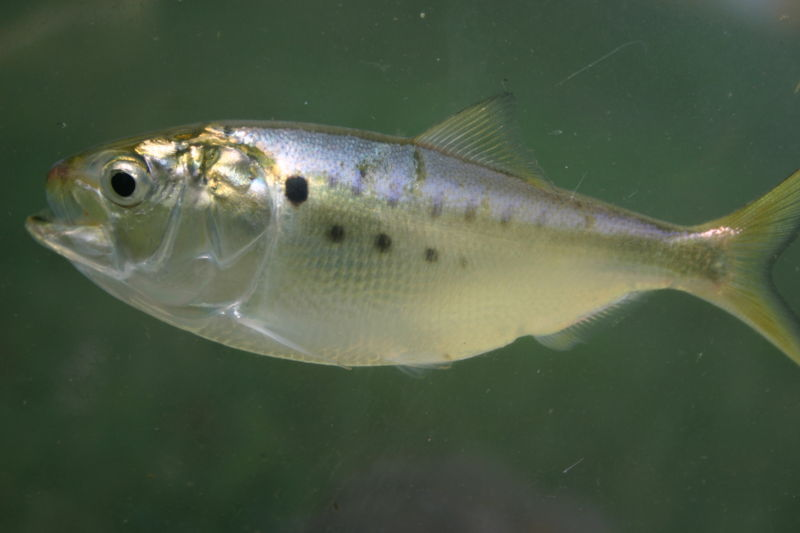
- Atlantic menhaden

Scientific classification
- Kingdom: Animalia
- Phylum: Chordata
- Class: Actinopterygii
- Division: Teleostei
- Order: Clupeiformes
- Family: Alosidae
- Genus: Brevoortia; Gill, 1861

Type species
- Clupea menhaden Mitchill, 1814

= Brevoortia =

Genus of fishes

The genus Brevoortia are all species of menhaden, there are found mainly in western Atlantic and consist of the following species:

- Brevoortia aurea (Spix & Agassiz, 1829) (Brazilian menhaden)
- Brevoortia gunteri Hildebrand, 1948 (Finescale menhaden)
- Brevoortia patronus Goode, 1878 (Gulf menhaden)
- Brevoortia pectinata (Jenyns, 1842) (Argentine menhaden)
- Brevoortia smithi Hildebrand, 1941 (Yellowfin menhaden)
- Brevoortia tyrannus (Latrobe, 1802) (Atlantic menhaden)
