= Reduction fishery =

Fishery that reduces its catch into fishmeal and fish oil

Reduction fisheries are fisheries that reduce (that is, process) their catch into fish meal and fish oil. They rely largely on small and medium-sized pelagic species; that is, fish found in the upper layers of the open sea, such as menhaden, anchovies, and sardines.

== See also ==
- Animal product – Material derived from non-human animal body
- Fish processing – Process from catching to selling fish
- Fish products – Food product produced from fish
