= List of settlements in the Xanthi regional unit =

This is a list of settlements in the Xanthi regional unit, Greece.

- Abdera
- Avato
- Dafnonas
- Diomideia
- Echinos
- Erasmio
- Evlalo
- Evmoiro
- Exochi
- Galani
- Genisea
- Gerakas
- Karyofyto
- Kimmeria
- Komnina
- Kotyli
- Koutso
- Krousa
- Livas
- Magiko
- Mandra
- Mangana
- Myki
- Myrodato
- Nea Kessani
- Neochori
- Olvio
- Oraio
- Paschalia
- Pigadia
- Polysitos
- Satres
- Selero
- Selino
- Sounio
- Stavroupoli
- Thermes
- Toxotes
- Xanthi

== See also ==
- List of towns and villages in Greece
- Slavic toponyms of places in Xanthi Prefecture
