= List of former toponyms in Xanthi Prefecture =

Many inhabited places in Xanthi Prefecture of Greece had older Greek and non-Greek forms. Most of those names were in use during the multinational environment of the Ottoman Empire, which controlled the region until the Balkan Wars on 1912–1913. Some of the forms were identifiably of Greek origin, others of Turkish, of Slavic and of more obscure origins. Following the First World War and the Greco-Turkish War which followed, an exchange of population took place between Greece, Yugoslavia, Bulgaria and Turkey (the Treaty of Neuilly between Greece and Bulgaria and the Treaty of Lausanne between Greece and Turkey). The villages of the exchanged populations (Bulgarians and Muslims) in Greece were resettled with Greek refugees from Asia Minor and local Macedonian Greeks.

The Greek government renamed many places with revived ancient names, local Greek-language names, or translations of the non-Greek names.

Slavic language
Turkish language

Previous (Slavic or Turkish) name(s)	Current official name other Greek names	Geographic Coordinates	Citation	Population (2001)	Other
Ada (Ада)	Livera (Λιβερά)	41°09′N 24°42′E	p. 139		
Gorna Ada (Горна Ада)	Ano Livera (Άνω Λιβερά)	41°09′N 24°42′E	p. 139		
Dolna Ada (Долна Ада)	Kato Livera (Κάτω Λιβερά)	41°09′N 24°42′E	p. 139		
Gabrovo (Габрово)	Kallithea (Καλλιθέα)	41°15′N 24°44′E	p. 150	1,092	
Gorna Kozludzha, Gorno Kozludzhikyoy (Горна Козлуджа, Горно Козлуджикьой)	Ano Karyofyto (Άνω Καρυόφυτο)	41°16′N 24°40′E	p. 152	162	
Demir Tash (Демир Таш)	Sidiropetra (Σιδηρόπετρα)	41°15′N 24°37′E	p. 154	6	
Dolna Kozludzha, Dolno Kozludzhikyoy (Долна Козлуджа, Долно Козлуджикьой)	Kato Karyofyto (Κάτω Καρυόφυτο)	41°16′N 24°40′E	p. 157	114	
Dolno Husenikyoy (Долно Хусеникьой)	Kato Ioniko (Κάτω Ιωνικό)	41°14′N 24°37′E	p. 158	77	
Enikyoy, Krstopole (Еникьой, Кърстополе)	Stavroupoli (Σταυρούπολις)	41°12′N 24°42′E	p. 161	797	
Kalovadzhik (Каловаджик)	Dexameni (Δεξαμενή)	41°17′N 24°37′E	p. 167		
Kalovo (Калово)	Kalyva (Καλύβα)	41°17′N 24°37′E	p. 167	23	
Kurlar (Курлар)	Komnina (Κομνηνά)	41°10′N 24°44′E	p. 175	332	
Kurtalan (Курталан)	Lykodromio (Λυκοδρόμιο)	41°13′N 24°47′E	p. 175	40	
Margarit (Маргарит)	Margariti (Μαργαρίτι)	41°16′N 24°43′E	p. 179	31	
Mahmutli (Махмутли)	Dafnonas (Δαφνώνας)	41°13′N 24°40′E	p. 180	419	
Mesheli (Мешели)	Kalo Nero (Καλό Νερό)	41°15′N 24°41′E	p. 181		
Neochorion, Novo Selo (Неохорион, Ново Село)	Neochori (Νεοχώριον)	41°13′N 24°38′E	p. 182	254	
Okchilar (Окчилар)	Toxotes (Τοξόται)	41°05′N 24°48′E	p. 183	751	
Saltikli (Салтикли)	Imera (Ίμερα)	41°07′N 24°47′E	p. 192		
Sarnich (Сарнич)	Kromnikon (Κρωμνικόν)	41°09′N 24°44′E	p. 192		
Hadirköy (Хадиркьой)	Nestochorion (Νεστοχώριον)	41°20′N 24°48′E	p. 198		
Hamidiye (Хамидийе)	Leivaditis (Λειβαδίτης)	41°19′N 24°40′E	p. 198	68	
Horozlu (Хорозлу)	Kastanitis (Καστανίτης)	41°15′N 24°42′E	p. 199	2	
Hodzhalar (Ходжалар)	Stavrochori (Σταυροχώριον)	41°15′N 24°36′E	p. 200	56	
Huseniköy, Gorno Husenikyoy (Хусеникьой, Горно Хусеникьой)	Ioniko, Ano Ionikon (Ιωνικό, Άνω Ιωνικό)	41°15′N 24°38′E	p. 200	78	
Chakirli (Чакирли)	Galani (Γαλάνη)	41°06′N 24°47′E	p. 200	137	
Ashiklar (Ашиклар)	Lykovounion (Λυκοβούνιον)	41°15′N 24°33′E	p. 237		
Bayramli (Байрамли)	Paschalia (Πασχαλιά)	41°14′N 24°35′E	p. 238	125	
Boyuva, Boeva (Боюва, Боева)	Kastanoton (Καστανωτόν)	41°13′N 24°33′E	p. 239		
Drenova (Дренова)	Aerikon (Αερικόν)	41°15′N 24°31′E	p. 241		
Kz Buku, Kzbüköy (Къз Буку, Къзбюкьой)	Drymia (Δρυμιά)	41°15′N 24°34′E	p. 246	64	
Muradzhik (Мураджик)	Myrtoussa (Μυρτούσσα)	41°14′N 24°29′E	p. 248	13	
Halep (Халеп)	Chalepion (Χαλέπιον)	41°15′N 24°32′E	p. 253	26	
