= Koutso =

Settlement in Vistonida, Xanthi, Greece

Koutso Κουτσό
- Community
- Location within Greece
- Coordinates: 41°02′56″N 25°01′26″E
- Country: Greece
- Administrative region: Eastern Macedonia and Thrace
- Regional unit: Xanthi
- Municipality: Abdera
- Municipal unit: Vistonida

Population (2021)
  - Community: 546
- Time zone: UTC+2 (EET)
  - Summer (DST): UTC+3 (EEST)

Koutso (Greek: Κουτσό) is a settlement in the Vistonida municipal unit, Xanthi regional unit of Greece. It is located 7 kilometers east of Genisea, 5 kilometers southeast of Nea Kessani, and 15.5 kilometers northwest of Xanthi. According to the 2021 census, the population was 546 inhabitants. In 1981, the population of Koutso was around 1118 inhabitants. In 1991, the population dropped to around 510 inhabitants.
