= Giona, Xanthi =

Settlement in the Xanthi regional unit of Greece

Coordinates: 41°01′N 24°55′E

Giona (Greek: Γκιώνα, previously known as Giouveiler) is a settlement in the Xanthi regional unit of Greece, part of the community of Avdira. It is located 9 kilometers northwest of Avdira, 9 kilometers northwest of Magiko, 11 kilometers northeast of Genisea, 7 kilometers west of Exochi, 4 kilometers east southeast of Pezoula, and 18.2 kilometers from Xanthi. In 1991, the population of Giona was around 154 inhabitants.
