= Bulgaria-Greece border =

The Bulgaria–Greece border separates the Republic of Bulgaria and Greece in Southeast Europe, it has a length of 494 km (307 mi).

It begins on Tumba Mountain peak at the tripoint with North Macedonia follows eastward along the ridge of the Belasica range to near the Struma river. It continues eastward following the watershed between the Maritsa river in Bulgaria and the rivers emptying into the Thracian Sea on the Greek side until is reaches the Erythropotamos river. It then follows (mostly) that river to near the village of Alepochori. It then turns north, until it reaches the Maritsa river, which then forms the boundary up to the tripoint with Turkey near Kapitan Andreevo.

== Border crossings ==
Since the entry of Bulgaria into the Schengen Area regular border checks have been abolished. There are a total of seven crossings between the two countries. The following is a table of the crossing points, listed from West to East:

(Bulgaria) Bulgarian checkpoint	Province	(Greece) Greek checkpoint	Municipality	Route in Bulgaria	Route in Greece
Kulata	Blagoevgrad	Promachonas	Sintiki		
Ilinden	Blagoevgrad	Exochi	Kato Nevrokopi		
Aegean Pass south of Rudozem	Smolyan	Dimario	Melivoia		local road
Zlatograd	Smolyan	Thermes	Myki	local road	
Makaza Pass south of Lozengradtsi	Kardzhali	Makaza pass north of Nimfea			
Ivaylovgrad	Haskovo	Kyprinos	Orestiada		
Kapitan Petko voyvoda	Haskovo	Ormenio	Orestiada		
