= Sounio, Xanthi =

Sounio Σούνιο
- Community

- Location within Greece
- Coordinates: 41°07′48″N 25°02′35″E
- Country: Greece
- Administrative region: Eastern Macedonia and Thrace
- Regional unit: Xanthi
- Municipality: Abdera
- Municipal unit: Vistonida

Population (2021)
  - Community: 924
- Time zone: UTC+2 (EET)
  - Summer (DST): UTC+3 (EEST)

Sounio (Greek: Σούνιο) is a settlement in the Vistonida municipal unit, Xanthi regional unit of Greece. According to the 2021 census, the population was 924 inhabitants.
