= Glafki =

Settlement in the Xanthi regional unit of Greece

Coordinates: 41°16′00″N 24°56′00″E

Glafki (Greek: Γλαύκη, previously known as Giouktse Bounar) is a settlement in the Xanthi regional unit of Greece. It is part of the municipal unit of Myki, and is located north northeast of Sminthi and 23 kilometers northeast of Xanthi. In 1991, the population of Glafki was around 1,169 inhabitants. In 2001, the population slightly rose to around 1,181 inhabitants.
