= Livas =

Settlement in Xanthi, Greece

Livas Λίβας
- Former settlement
- Interactive map of Livas
- Location within Greece
- Coordinates: 41°13′N 24°57′E
- Country: Greece
- Administrative Region: Eastern Macedonia and Thrace
- Regional unit: Xanthi

Population
  - Total: 0
- Time zone: UTC+2 (EET)
  - Summer (DST): UTC+3 (EEST)

Livas (Greek: Λίβας) is a former settlement in Xanthi, Greece

Between 1924 and 1960 it frequently changed municipalities between Myki and Kimmeria, and prefectures between Rodopi and Xanthi several times. The settlement was officially abolished in 1961 and has no inhabitants.
