= Krousa =

Human settlement in Greece

Coordinates: 41°13′N 24°56′E

Krousa (Greek: Κρούσα) is a settlement in the municipality of Myki in the Xanthi regional unit of Greece.

== See also ==
- List of settlements in the Xanthi regional unit
