= Lagos, Xanthi =

Port town in Xanthi, Greece

Lagos Λάγος
- Settlement
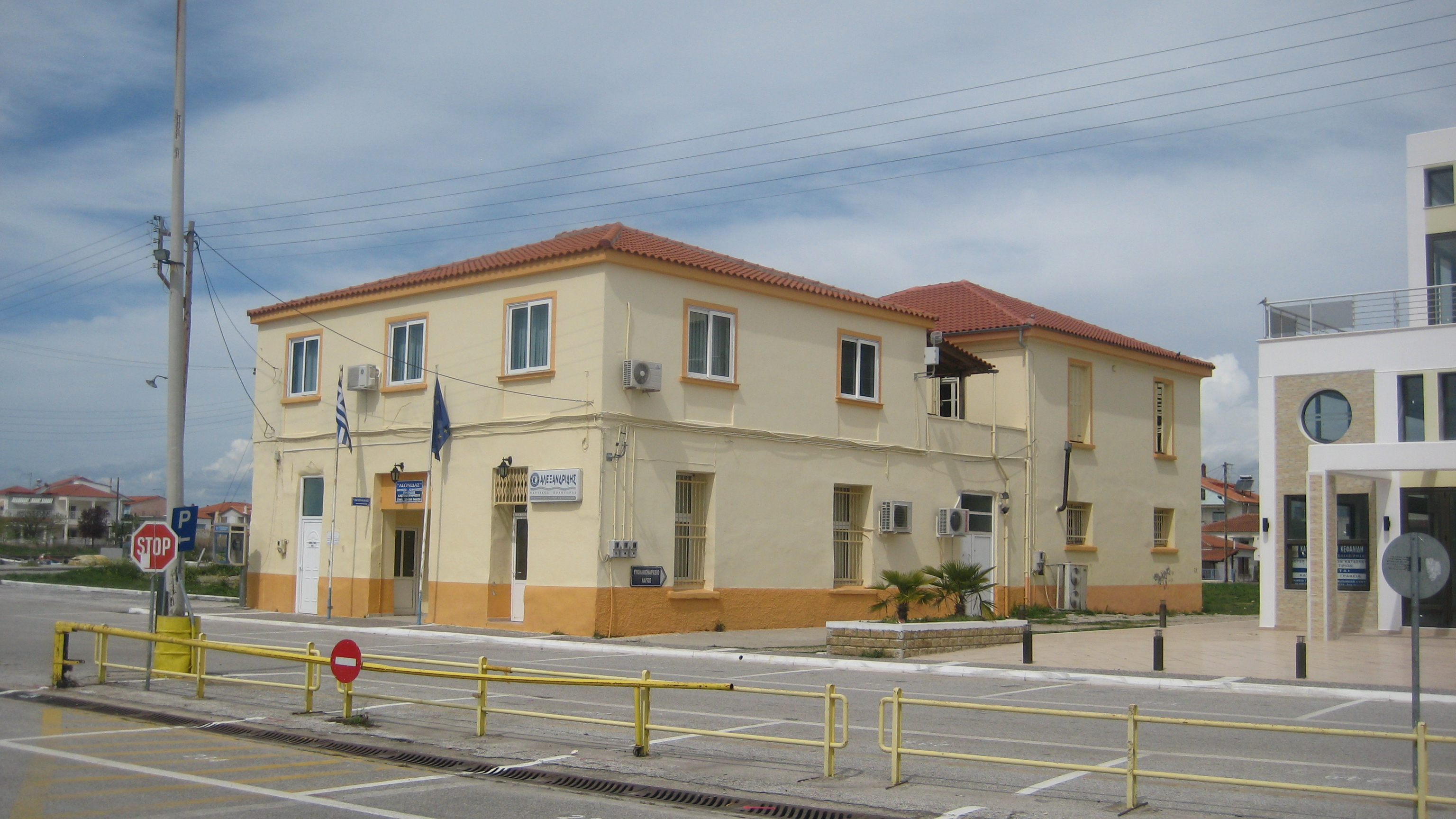
- Porto Lagos port administration
- Interactive map of Lagos
- Country: Greece
- Administrative region: East Macedonia and Thrace
- Regional unit: Xanthi
- Municipality: Nea Kessani

Population (1991)
  - Total: 371

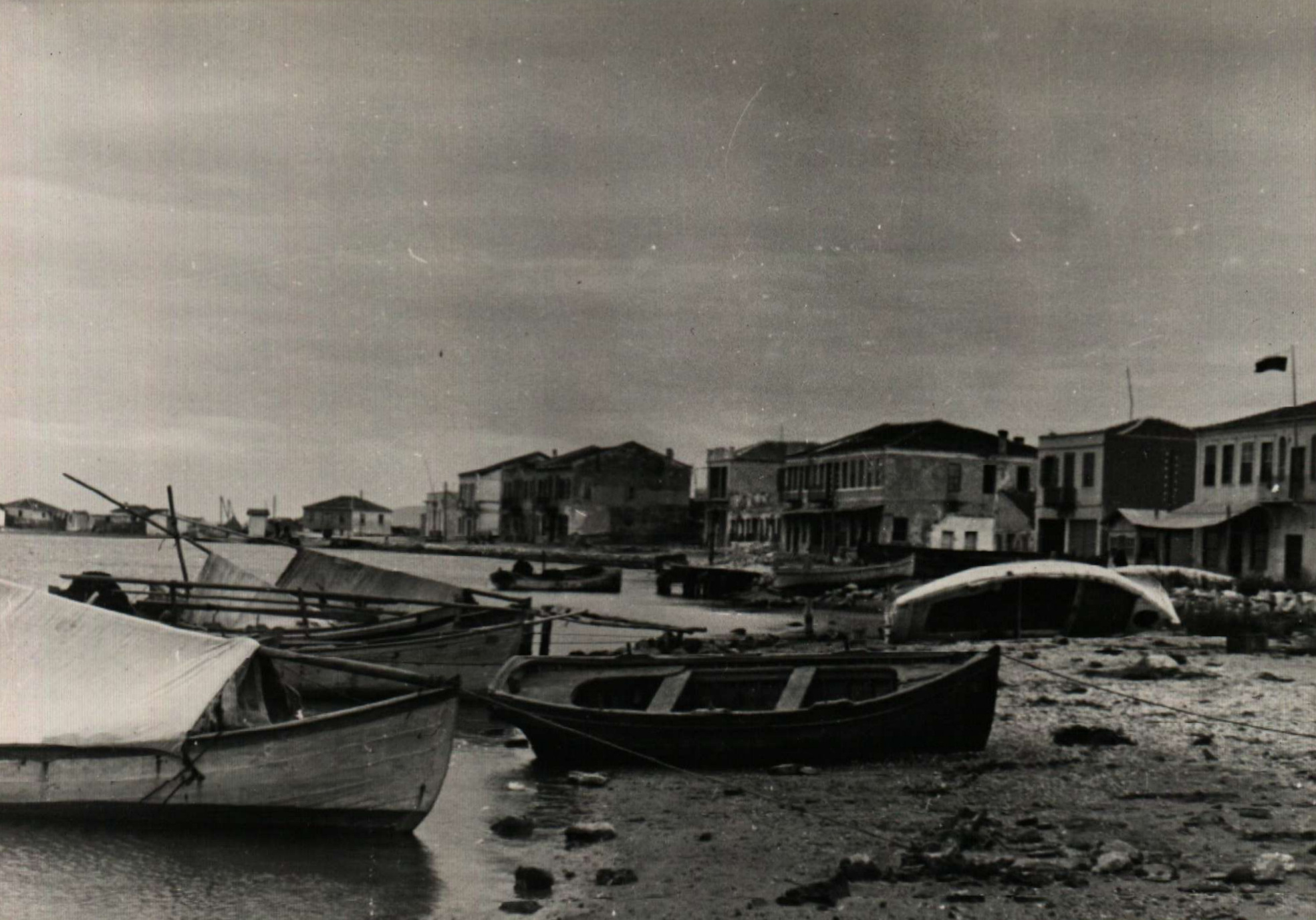
Lagos in the 1940s. Source: Bulgarian Archives State Agency.

Lagos (Greek: Λάγος) is a settlement in the Xanthi regional unit of Greece. It is part of the community Nea Kessani. It is situated on the bar separating Lake Vistonida from the Aegean Sea. In 1991, the settlement contained 371 inhabitants.
