= Polysitos =

Polysitos Πολύσιτος
- Community
- Location within Greece
- Coordinates: 41°06′32″N 25°01′26″E
- Country: Greece
- Administrative region: Eastern Macedonia and Thrace
- Regional unit: Xanthi
- Municipality: Abdera
- Municipal unit: Vistonida

Population (2021)
  - Community: 347
- Time zone: UTC+2 (EET)
  - Summer (DST): UTC+3 (EEST)

Polysitos (Greek: Πολύσιτος) is a settlement in the Vistonida municipal unit, Xanthi regional unit of Greece. According to the 2021 census, the population was 347 inhabitants.
