= Semeli =

Pomak settlement in the Xanthi regional unit of Greece

Coordinates: 41°06′N 24°48′E

Semeli (Greek: Σεμέλη) is a Pomak settlement in the Xanthi regional unit of Greece, part of the community of Toxotes. It is located northeast of Toxotes and approximately 12 kilometers southwest of Xanthi. In 1991, the settlement contained around 39 inhabitants.
