= Xanthi F.C. =

Greek football club

Xanthi
- Full name: Αθλητικός Όμιλος Ξάνθη (Athletic Club Xanthi)
- Nickname: Akrítes (Frontiersmen)
- Short name: AOX
- Founded: 4 June 1967; 59 years ago
- Ground: Xanthi Ground (current); Xanthi FC Arena (formerly)
- Capacity: 9,500
- Chairman: Konstantinos Psomas
- Manager: Konstantinos Anyfantakis
- League: Gamma Ethniki
- 2025–26: Gamma Ethniki (Group 1), 2nd
- Website: aoxanthi.gr
| Home colours | Away colours |

Xanthi Football Club, (Greek: Α.Ο. Ξάνθη) previously Skoda Xanthi, is a Greek football club based in Xanthi, Western Thrace. They play their home matches at Xanthi Ground.

Founded in 1967, Xanthi is well set up in terms of their financial support and youth setup. Xanthi participated in the UEFA Cup / Europa League in 2001–02, 2005–06, 2006–07 and 2013–14 seasons. In the 2004–05 season, Xanthi finished fourth in the Alpha Ethinki (First Division, today Super League), the club's all-time best performance.

Xanthi's first appearance in the first division was in 1989, and the club remained in the top flight until its relegation in 2020.

On 19 September 2022, Xanthi FC announced its withdrawal from the Super League 2 championship, putting an end to its presence in the professional categories, as it failed to address the financial and administrative problems it was facing. Since then, the team has been undergoing dissolution, with only the amateur club AOX continuing to exist.

Starting from the 2023–24 season, AOX restarted from the amateur leagues of the Xanthi Football Clubs Association participating in the Second Division. It won all 24 matches and was promoted to the above division. In the First Division of Xanthi FCA, where it competed the following season (2024–25), it again won the title undefeated and participated in the special promotion championship, in which it won promotion to the national divisions after 3 full years. In the upcoming year, Xanthi will compete in 2026–27 Gamma Ethniki.

== History ==
The club was formed in 1967 from the merger of two local clubs: Aspida Xanthi, who was founded in 1922 and was the club of the most popular layers of the region (the "blues" in 1961 had become champions in the Northern League of Beta Ethniki, losing the accession from Panelefsiniakos in the barrage game) and Orfeas Xanthi, who was founded in 1903 and was the bourgeoisie of the city. From 1957 to 1964, Orfeas competed in the Northern Group of the Beta Ethniki (which held in 3 groups). The derby of the two teams was the most characteristic, with the city divided into two in each encounter.

In June 1967, with the Greek military junta in government, the movements in Xanthi were also made to create a team that would unite the dynamics of the two clubs, while the national championships were reorganized. The strengthening of the region in sport at that time had also taken place in other parts of the country and at the same time AO Xanthi (among other clubs) participated directly in the single second national category. Not long ago, from 1967 until 1985, the club remained in the Beta Ethniki, with all the restructuring that had suffered the class and benefited in the early years. The difficulties were great, the revenues were few, but Xanthi's stadium was always filled. The yellow and black beads of Orfeas Xanthi and the shades of Aspida Xanthi, have brought the red of AO Xanthi, which has joined and united the city for many years. Those years were different, difficult, but "sweet". Without the abundance of images, the imagination was rampant, transforming footballers into "holy monsters" of the sport. Something that apply for all teams. 18 years stays Xanthi Football Club on the stadiums of the Beta Ethniki. In this timeframe, the club generally completed the racing season under the 10th place of the scoreboard, while only in 1969–70 they had reached the 7th and the 1974–75 season in the 9th place. When they started to show how they were preparing for the jump in the top division, the 1982–83 season ended 5th, the next 4th and the 1984–85 season which was ambitious for something bigger, they were downgraded.

In 1985–86, with this new administration of Mr. Kokkalas, Xanthi was reformed and returned stronger. First title in the Gamma Ethniki in 1985–86, followed by another three seasons in the Beta Ethniki until the big dream came true. From the 8th and 11th places of '87 and '88 respectively, in the summer of 1989 the city and the club lived unforgettable moments by conquering the title of the Beta Ethniki and at the same time the historic rise in the big lounges. In one year, Xanthi had first goal scorer Achilleas Adamopoulos with 30 goals.

=== First years in the top division ===
The first experiences in the Alpha Ethniki were unique. With enthusiasm, passion and a "hot" atmosphere at the stadium, the basic goal of staying in the early years was achieved with a lot of stress. Under the administration of Theodoros Kokkalas, foreign footballers were brought on, with the Brazilians Marcelo Veridiano and Sandro making the start. Veridiano has a special place in the heart of the fans, as he still continues to be the top scorer of the club. Despite the anxiety and the result justifying the efforts, Xanthi remained until October 1991 in the Alpha Ethniki and with the same profile.

During the chairmanship of Theodoros Kokkalas, Xanthi had already managed to win two championships in the Gamma and Beta Ethniki to advance to the Alpha Ethniki. Skoda's Greek importer, Viamar S.A., became the team's title sponsor as they were renamed "Skoda Xanthi". The arrangement was finalised on 10 October 1991.

=== Panopoulos era ===
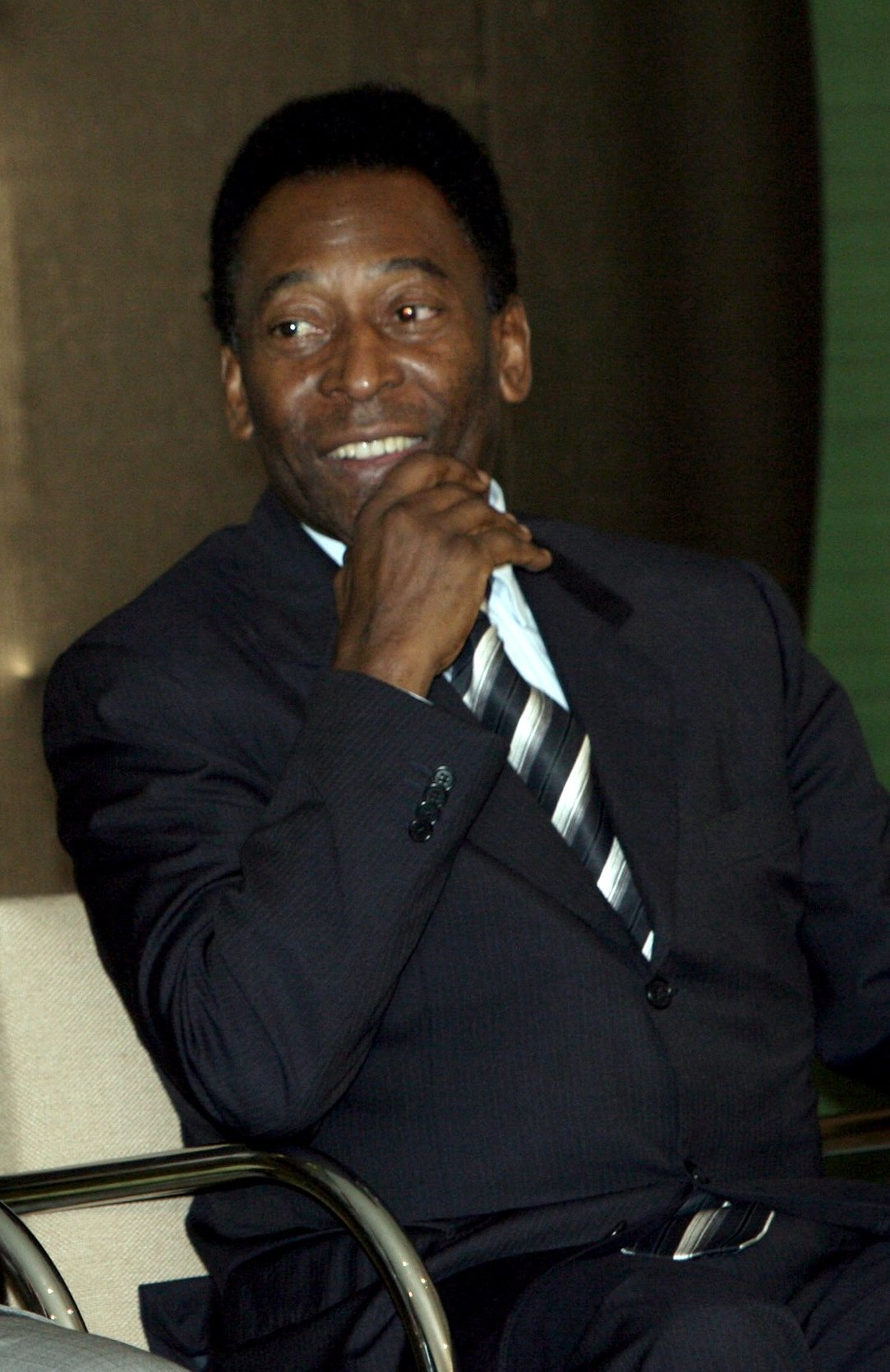
Pelé officially inaugurated Xanthi's new stadium Xanthi FC Arena in 2005.

Also, while several companies perceive marketing as a feature of impressions, Xanthi has been successful since Christos Panopoulos took over this business. In 1991, Xanthi giving its solutions in the economic field and at the same time becoming a rising-initially-and constant force afterwards. They were the first club that established for many years in the 1990s the award of its best Player of the Year, with a donation of a sponsor car. It was the first provincial club that in 1994 had organized an international tournament at the Xanthi Ground with the participation of Coventry City, Portsmouth and AEK Athens. That same year he had brought coach Howard Kendall, who a few months earlier was a coach in Everton. In 2005, the world's top football player, Pelé, launched its sports center and its new stadium Xanthi FC Arena, giving the world glamour to the event. In the same year, on 7 July, Xanthi announced one of the biggest transfers in its history, the Brazilian defensive midfielder Emerson.

=== Bill Papas era ===
Bill Papas paid US$15 million to buy the club. Since 2021 Xanthi has come in the media spotlight in Australia as Bill Papas who ran Forum Group is alleged to have defrauded 400 million Australian dollars. On 7 June 2022, it was reported that Papas' shares in the club were frozen by Greek authorities. On the 19th September 2022, Xanthi F.C. announced that the club resigned from the Super League Greece 2 due to financial issues. Papas stated that he was unable to sell the club or find alternate ways of funding the side for over 9 months.

== Crest and colours ==
=== Crest ===
In the early years, the team's emblem consisted exclusively of Democritus. A new emblem with small changes was introduced in 1985. The emblem was retained in this form until 1991 when elements of VIAMAR SA, a new owner of the club, were added. In 1996, Skoda's brand was added. A further change in the emblem took place in 2001, with the addition of the soccer ball, while in 2007 a different version of the particular emblem was presented. In 2012 a new emblem was presented, in which the bust of Democritus was now in the middle.

The year 2016 is a new reference point in the history of Xanthi. Many and radical changes to issues that were not racing. At the end of the 2015–16 season, and more specifically from 1 June 2016, Skoda Xanthi SA returned to its roots and is now called AO Xanthi Football Club. The cooperation of the "mother" of the football club VIAMAR SA ended with the well-known automotive industry and therefore the association that has linked its name for 25 consecutive years with its sponsor, goes back with its own forces and of course, under the auspices of VIAMAR, the company of the major shareholder Mr. Christos Panopoulos. This has led to many changes. From the name and logo, to the field and the philosophy.

=== Colours ===
The yellow and black kits of Orfeas and the shades of Aspida, have brought the red of AO Xanthi, which has joined and united the city for many years.

== Stadium ==
Xanthi FC Arena's pitch and secondary stand

Xanthi left their old stadium, the Xanthi Ground (capacity 9,500), located near the centre of the city, for the Xanthi FC Arena in 2004. Their new stadium sited 8 km outside the city, near Pigadia village, has a capacity of 7,244, however has only 3 stands. When the final stand is finally built, the new capacity will be around 9,000 seats. The stadium is located in the same place as the sports center of the Thracian Club, a real jewel for Greek football. The sports center includes, among other things, seven stadiums, as well as the hotel "Le Chalet". The construction of the stadium itself, costing €6,500,000.

The first game at the Xanthi FC Arena took place on 18 September 2004, with the team of Xanthi being imposed 3–1 on Aris for the 1st match of Alpha Ethniki Championship for the 2004–05 season.

The stadium was officially inaugurated by the Brazilian legend Pelé on 12 May 2005.

On 16 January 2005, and before the game with Ionian a fan of Xanthi, Stamatis Georgoudakis lost his life. Since then the Gate B-C has been named after the stadium. The ticket record was played with Panathinaikos on 20 January 2007 with 6,642 spectators. In the summer of 2016, the stadium was renamed "Xanthi FC Arena".

=== Facilities ===
Next to Xanthi FC Arena, there is the club's athletic center, which, in addition to the two courts, has all the necessary spaces for coaches, players and staff to work on their field. In a large area near the stadium, it is located in the sports center of Xanthi, with the "despotic" presence of the hotel Le Chalet. A hotel that after its complete destruction on 7 March 2003 by fire, was not the few who supported, that Christos Panopoulos would leave everything and would be away from the team and generally from football. This has not been done, and to this day, Le Chalet overlooking the 7 football fields, the pool, the pool bar, the basketball court, the tennis court and the changing rooms, has all the specifications for an excellent sporting preparation. For the team of Xanthi and all the departments of its Academy and many other clubs that have preferred the athletic center of Xanthi to preparation before the start of the season. In 2017, it was also characteristic that the coach of Greece, Michael Skibbe, in one of his first statements as a federal coach, referring to the sports center of Xanthi with the best words.

== Honours ==
=== Domestic ===
League

- Football League Greece
  - Winners: 1988–89
- Gamma Ethniki
  - Winners: 1985–86
- Xanthi FCA First Division
  - Winners: 2024–25
- Xanthi FCA Second Division
  - Winners: 2023–24

Cups

- Greek Cup
  - Runners-up: 2014–15

== League history ==
- 1967–1985: Division 2
- 1985–1986: Division 3
- 1986–1989: Division 2
- 1989–2020: Division 1 / Super League
- 2020–2022: Super League 2
- 2022–2023: inactive
- 2023–2024: Xanthi FCA Second Division
- 2024–2025: Xanthi FCA First Division
- 2025–: Gamma Ethniki

== Seasons in the 21st century ==
| Season | Category | Position | Cup |
|---|---|---|---|
| 2000–01 | Alpha Ethniki | 8th | QF |
| 2001–02 | Alpha Ethniki | 5th | SF |
| 2002–03 | Alpha Ethniki | 9th | 2R |
| 2003–04 | Alpha Ethniki | 10th | R16 |
| 2004–05 | Alpha Ethniki | **4th** | SF |
| 2005–06 | Alpha Ethniki | 5th | QF |
| 2006–07 | Super League | 11th | SF |
| 2007–08 | Super League | 8th | QF |
| 2008–09 | Super League | 7th | QF |
| 2009–10 | Super League | 13th | QF |
| 2010–11 | Super League | 9th | 4R |
| 2011–12 | Super League | 11th | 5R |
| 2012–13 | Super League | 7th | 4R |
| 2013–14 | Super League | 16th | 2R |
| 2014–15 | Super League | 8th | RU |
| 2015–16 | Super League | 13th | GS |
| 2016–17 | Super League | 6th | QF |
| 2017–18 | Super League | 6th | R16 |
| 2018–19 | Super League | 12th | R16 |
| 2019–20 | Super League | 13th (R) | R16 |
| 2020–21 | Super League 2 | 2nd | – |
| 2021–22 | Super League 2 | 3rd | 5R |
| 2022–23 | Xanthi FCA | inactive | – |
| 2023–24 | Xanthi FCA 2nd Division | 1st | – |
| 2024–25 | Xanthi FCA 1st Division | 1st | – |
| 2025–26 | Gamma Ethniki | 2nd | – |

Best position in bold.

Key: 2R = Second Round, 3R = Third Round, 4R = Fourth Round, 5R = Fifth Round, GS = Group Stage, R16 = Round of 16, QF = Quarter-finals, SF = Semi-finals.

== European matches ==
| Season | Competition | Round | Opponent | Home | Away | Aggregate |
|---|---|---|---|---|---|---|
| 2002–03 | UEFA Cup | First round | (Italy) Lazio | 0–0 | 0–4 | 0–4 |
| 2005–06 | UEFA Cup | First round | (England) Middlesbrough | 0–0 | 0–2 | 0–2 |
| 2006–07 | UEFA Cup | First round | (Romania) Dinamo București | 3–4 | 1–4 | 4–8 |
| 2013–14 | UEFA Europa League | Second qualifying round | (Northern Ireland) Linfield | 0–1 | 2–1 (aet) | 2–2 (a) |
| 2013–14 | UEFA Europa League | Third qualifying round | (Belgium) Standard Liège | 1–2 | 1–2 | 2–4 |

== Personnel ==
Executive
| Chairman | (Greece) Konstantinos Psomas |
| Vice-Chairman | (Greece) Alexandros Gialaoglou |
| Secretary | (Greece) Ilias Bournatzis |
| Cashier | (Greece) Pavlos Dagas |
| Board Member | (Greece) Apostolos Kioleidis |
First team staff
| Sport Director | (Greece) Nikos Kechagias |
| Head Coach | (Greece) Konstantinos Anyfantakis |
| Assistant Coach | (Greece) Anestis Alexoudis |
| Caretaker | (Greece) Panagiotis Kamarakis |

== Managerial history ==
- (Greece) Tasos Anastasiadis (1989)
- (Greece) Ioannis Gounaris (1989–90)
- (Netherlands) Henk Houwaart (1 July 1990 – 30 June 1991)
- (England) Howard Kendall (1994)
- (Austria) Kurt Jara (1 January 1996 – 28 February 1997)
- (Greece) Ioannis Matzourakis (1 July 1996 – 31 December 1999)
- (Greece) Nikos Karageorgiou (1 July 2001 – 30 June 2004)
- (Greece) Ioannis Matzourakis (1 July 2004 – 25 September 2006)
- (Greece) Takis Lemonis (4 Oct 2006 – 20 December 2006)
- (Greece) Savvas Kofidis (22 Nov 2006 – 3 May 2007)
- (Norway) Jörn Andersen (3 May 2007 – 10 June 2007)
- (Greece) Nikos Kehagias (2007)
- (Belgium) Emilio Ferrera (1 July 2007 – 22 October 2007)
- (Greece) Nikos Kehagias (2007–08)
- (Greece) Ioannis Matzourakis (24 April 2008 – 30 June 2008)
- (Greece) Georgios Paraschos (1 July 2008 – 30 June 2009)
- (Germany) Wolfgang Wolf (1 July 2009 – 16 September 2009)
- (Greece) Kostas Konstantinidis (interim) (2009)
- (Greece) Ioannis Matzourakis (21 September 2009 – 22 February 2010)
- (Greece) Nikos Kehagias (23 February 2010 – 20 September 2010)
- (Greece) Georgios Paraschos (20 September 2010 – 8 November 2010)
- (Greece) Nikos Papadopoulos (14 Nov 2010 – 30 June 2011)
- (Greece) Marinos Ouzounidis (1 July 2011 – 22 September 2012)
- (Greece) Nikos Kostenoglou (30 September 2012 – 2 December 2012)
- (Greece) Marinos Ouzounidis (3 Dec 2012 – 21 April 2013)
- (Greece) Nikos Karageorgiou (27 April 2013 – 17 September 2013)
- (Germany) Reiner Maurer (24 September 2013 – 5 February 2014)
- (Greece) Nikos Kehagias (5 February 2014 – 25 June 2014)
- (Greece) Sakis Tsiolis (27 June 2014 – 15 September 2014)
- (Romania) Răzvan Lucescu (25 September 2014 – 23 April 2017)
- (Serbia) Milan Rastavac (25 April 2017 – 18 May 2019)
- (Spain) Kiko Ramírez (20 May 2019 – 25 November 2019)
- (Greece) Georgios Paraschos (8 December 2019 – 6 March 2020)
- (Australia) Tony Popovic (7 September 2020 – 22 February 2021)
- (Greece) Babis Tennes (1 March 2021 – 30 May 2021)
- (Portugal) Jaime Monroy (8 July 2021 – 12 November 2021)
- (Greece) Nikos Kehagias (12 November 2021 – 2022)
- (Greece) Christos Maladenis (2023–2024)
