= Pigadia =

Pigadia (Greek: Πηγάδια meaning "wells") may refer to several locations in Greece:

- Pigadia, Karpathos, the main town and port of Karpathos
- Pigadia, Drama, a village in the Drama regional unit
- Pigadia, Argolis, a village in Argolis
- Pigadia, Laconia, a village in Laconia
- Pigadia, Messenia, a village in Messenia
- Pigadia, Xanthi, a village in the Xanthi regional unit
- 3-5 Pigadia, a ski resort near Naousa, Imathia

== See also ==
- Battle of Pente Pigadia - a battle of the First Balkan War between the Ottomans and the Greeks
