= Vafeika =

Settlement in Xanthi, Greece

Coordinates: 41°05′N 24°58′E

Vafeika (Greek: Βαφέικα, also Βαφαίικα) is a settlement located approximately four kilometers from Genisea in the Xanthi regional unit of Greece. It is part of the community of Genisea.
