= Eranos, Xanthi =

- Location within Greece
- Coordinates: 41°11′N 24°57′E

Eranos (Greek: Έρανος, previously known as Otman Eren, Bulgarian: Отманери or Старо Село) is a settlement in the community of Kimmeria, Xanthi regional unit, Greece. It is located northeast of Kimmeria and 15 kilometers northeast of Xanthi.
