= Magiko =

Settlement in Vistonida, Xanthi, Greece

Magiko Μαγικό
- Community
- Location within Greece
- Coordinates: 41°03′47″N 24°54′00″E
- Country: Greece
- Administrative region: Eastern Macedonia and Thrace
- Regional unit: Xanthi
- Municipality: Abdera
- Municipal unit: Vistonida

Population (2021)
  - Community: 726
- Time zone: UTC+2 (EET)
  - Summer (DST): UTC+3 (EEST)

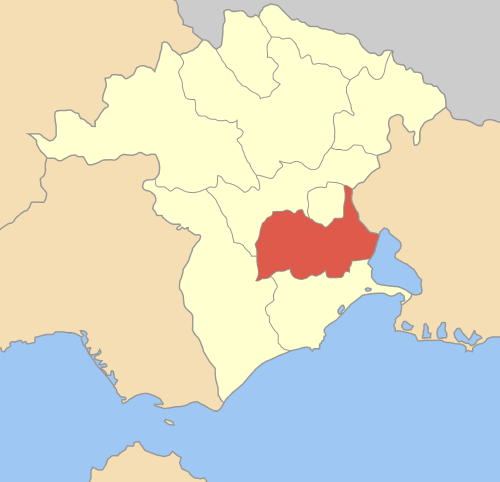
Vistonida municipality in Xanthi

Magiko (Greek: Μαγικό) is a settlement in the Vistonida municipal unit, Xanthi regional unit of Greece.
