= Thalassia, Greece =

Regional settlement

Coordinates: 41°04′N 24°47′E

Thalassia (Greek: Θαλασσιά, previously known as Denizli) is a settlement in the Xanthi regional unit of Greece. It is part of the community Toxotes. It is located 4 kilometers southwest of Toxotes and 15.8 kilometers southwest of Xanthi. In 1991, the population of Thalassia was around 365 inhabitants.
