= Kentavros =

Large municipal village

Kentavros Κένταυρος
- Community
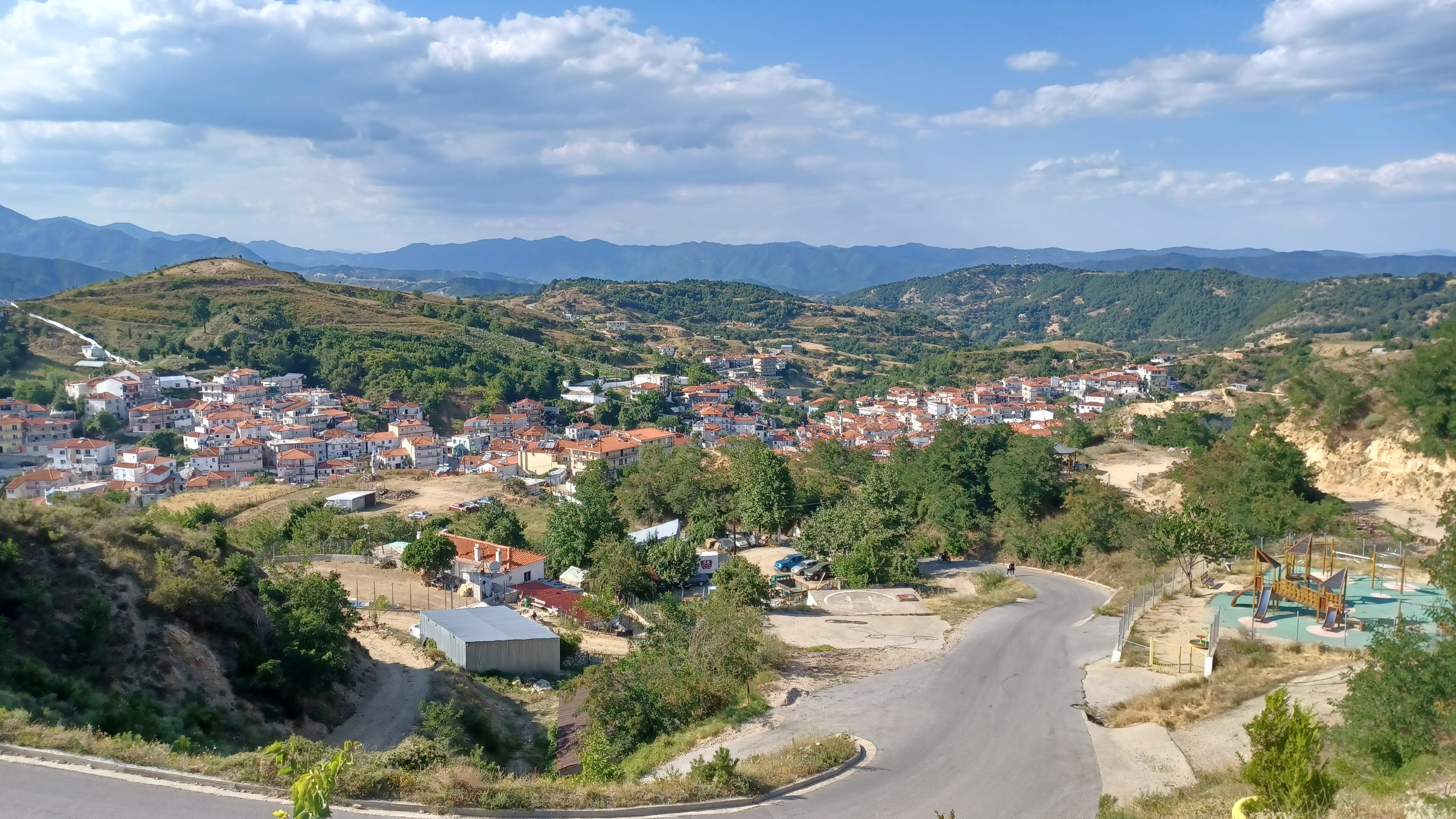
- View of Kentavros

- Location within Greece
- Coordinates: 41°13′44″N 24°57′11″E
- Country: Greece
- Administrative region: East Macedonia and Thrace
- Regional unit: Xanthi
- Municipality: Myki
- Municipal unit: Myki

Population (2021)
  - Community: 2,448
- Time zone: UTC+2 (EET)
  - Summer (DST): UTC+3 (EEST)
- Postal code: 673 00
- Vehicle registration: AH

Kentavros (Greek: Κένταυρος) is a small village in the municipality of Myki, in the Xanthi regional unit of Greece. Population 2,313 (2001).
