= Xanthi FC Arena =

Football Stadium

Coordinates: 41°07′17″N 24°56′58″E

- "Pigadia"
- The pitch and secondary stand
- Interactive map of Xanthi FC Arena
- Location: Pigadia, Xanthi, Greece
- Owner: Xanthi F.C. Holdings Inc.
- Operator: Xanthi F.C.
- Capacity: 7,244
- Surface: Grass

Construction
- Groundbreaking: 21 October 2003
- Opened: 30 May 2004
- Cost: € 6,500,000

Tenant
- Xanthi F.C. (2004–2022)

Xanthi FC Arena is a football ground built by Xanthi F.C. in Xanthi, Thrace, Greece. It was built over the course of ten months in 2004. It holds up to 7,244 spectators, with 80% of the seats under the roof. The stadium was built because of a disagreement between then FC Skoda Xanthi and the amateur club AO Xanthi. It is situated in an area where the club had built its training facilities (Xanthi Athletic Center). The stadium was officially inaugurated by the Brazilian legend Pelé on 12 May 2005.

Since the end of the 2021–22 Super League Greece 2 season, despite Xanthi finishing 3rd in the table, they were relegated to Xanthi Local FCA Championship due to financial troubles, they left Xanthi FC Arena for their old Xanthi Ground. Ever since, the stadium has fallen in a state of disrepair which has completely destroyed the playing surface.

== Capacity ==
The main stand, VIP seats and press box

The stadium's official capacity is 7,244 (all seated). It only has three stands, the fourth was promised but this never materialised, so there are boards behind the goal at one end.

== Location ==
The stadium is located near Pigadia, a village 5 km east of Xanthi. This city is in the region of Thrace (230 km east of Thessaloniki).

== Record attendance ==
The average attendance in the matches is about 1,500 people. The recorded peak attendance was 6,642 in a game against Panathinaikos on 20 January 2007, although the unofficial highest attendance is believed to be achieved against PAOK on 31 March 2019, when overcrowded PAOK fans flooded every corner of the stadium.

== See also ==
- Xanthi FC
- Xanthi
