= Kossos =

Exochi, Xanthi settlement

Coordinates: 41°03′N 24°49′E

Kossos (Greek: Κόσσος) is a settlement in the community Exochi, Xanthi regional unit, Greece. It is located northwest of Exochi and 13 kilometers southwest of Xanthi. In 1981, the population of Kossos was around 68 inhabitants. In 1991, the population slightly rose to around 76 inhabitants.
