= Agios Athanasios =

Agios Athanasios may refer to:

- Saint Athanasius of Alexandria
- Agios Athanasios, Cyprus
- Agios Athanasios, Euboea
- Agios Athanasios, Pella, a village in Pella regional unit, Greece
- Agios Athanasios, Thessaloniki, a municipality in the Thessaloniki regional unit, Greece
- Agios Athanasios, Xanthi, a village in the Xanthi regional unit, Greece
- Agios Athanasios, a neighborhood of Serres, Macedonia, Greece
