= Diomideia =

Settlement in Vistonida, Xanthi, Greece

Diomideia Διομήδεια
- Community
- Location within Greece
- Coordinates: 41°05′24″N 24°54′07″E
- Country: Greece
- Administrative region: Eastern Macedonia and Thrace
- Regional unit: Xanthi
- Municipality: Abdera
- Municipal unit: Vistonida

Population (2021)
  - Community: 4,583
- Time zone: UTC+2 (EET)
  - Summer (DST): UTC+3 (EEST)

Diomideia (Greek: Διομήδεια) is a settlement and a community in the Vistonida municipal unit of the Xanthi regional unit of Greece. According to the 2021 census, the population of Diomideia was 4,583 inhabitants.
