= Diomedia =

Diomedia may refer to:

- Diomideia, a location in Xanthi, Greece
- Islands of Diomedes, a location in Greek mythology

== See also ==
- Diomedea, a genus of seabirds
