= Giona =

Giona may refer to:

- Giona (given name)
- Mount Giona (Greek: Γκιώνα), a mountain in Phocis, Central Greece
- Giona, Xanthi, a settlement in the Xanthi regional unit, Greece
- Giona (river), a stream which rises on the slopes of Monte Tamaro, in the Swiss canton of Ticino, and flows into the Italian Lake Maggiore
- Budesonide, by its trade name Giona
