= Pachni =

Settlement in the Xanthi regional unit of Greece

Coordinates: 41°18′N 24°54′E

Pachni (Greek: Πάχνη, Bulgarian: Пашевик) is a settlement in the Xanthi regional unit of Greece, part of the municipal unit Kotyli. Greek foreign affairs minister Dora Bakoyannis visited the village during her tour of Thrace.
