= Alma, Greece =

Coordinates: 41°13′N 24°52′E

Alma (Greek: Άλμα, Bulgarian: Егнила, Egnila) is a settlement in the Xanthi regional unit of Greece. It is part of the community of Myki.
