= Echinos =

Echinos Εχίνος Шахин
- Community
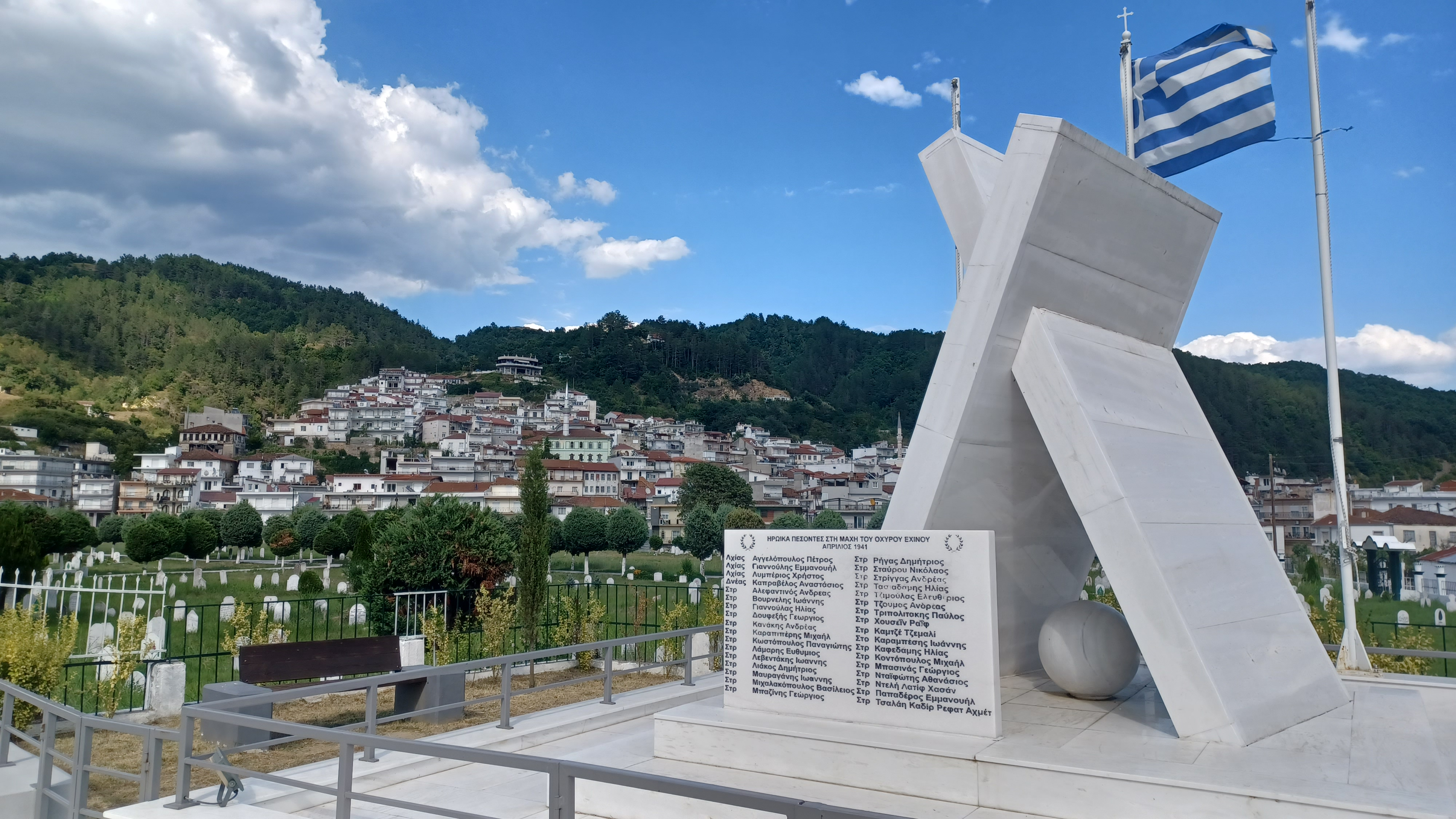
- View of Echinos

- Location within Greece
- Coordinates: 41°16.5′N 24°58.3′E
- Country: Greece
- Administrative region: East Macedonia and Thrace
- Regional unit: Xanthi
- Municipality: Myki
- Municipal unit: Myki

Area
  - Community: 85.691 km^{2} (33.085 sq mi)
- Elevation: 333 m (1,093 ft)

Population (2021)
  - Community: 2,780
  - Density: 32.4/km^{2} (84.0/sq mi)
- Time zone: UTC+2 (EET)
  - Summer (DST): UTC+3 (EEST)
- Postal code: 673 00
- Area code: +30-2544
- Vehicle registration: AH

Echinos (Greek: Εχίνος; Bulgarian: Шахин, Shahin) is a village and a community in the municipality Myki. Before the 2011 local government reform it was part of the municipality of Myki, of which it was a municipal district. The 2021 census recorded 2,780 inhabitants in the community. The community of Echinos covers an area of 85.691 km^{2}.

== History ==
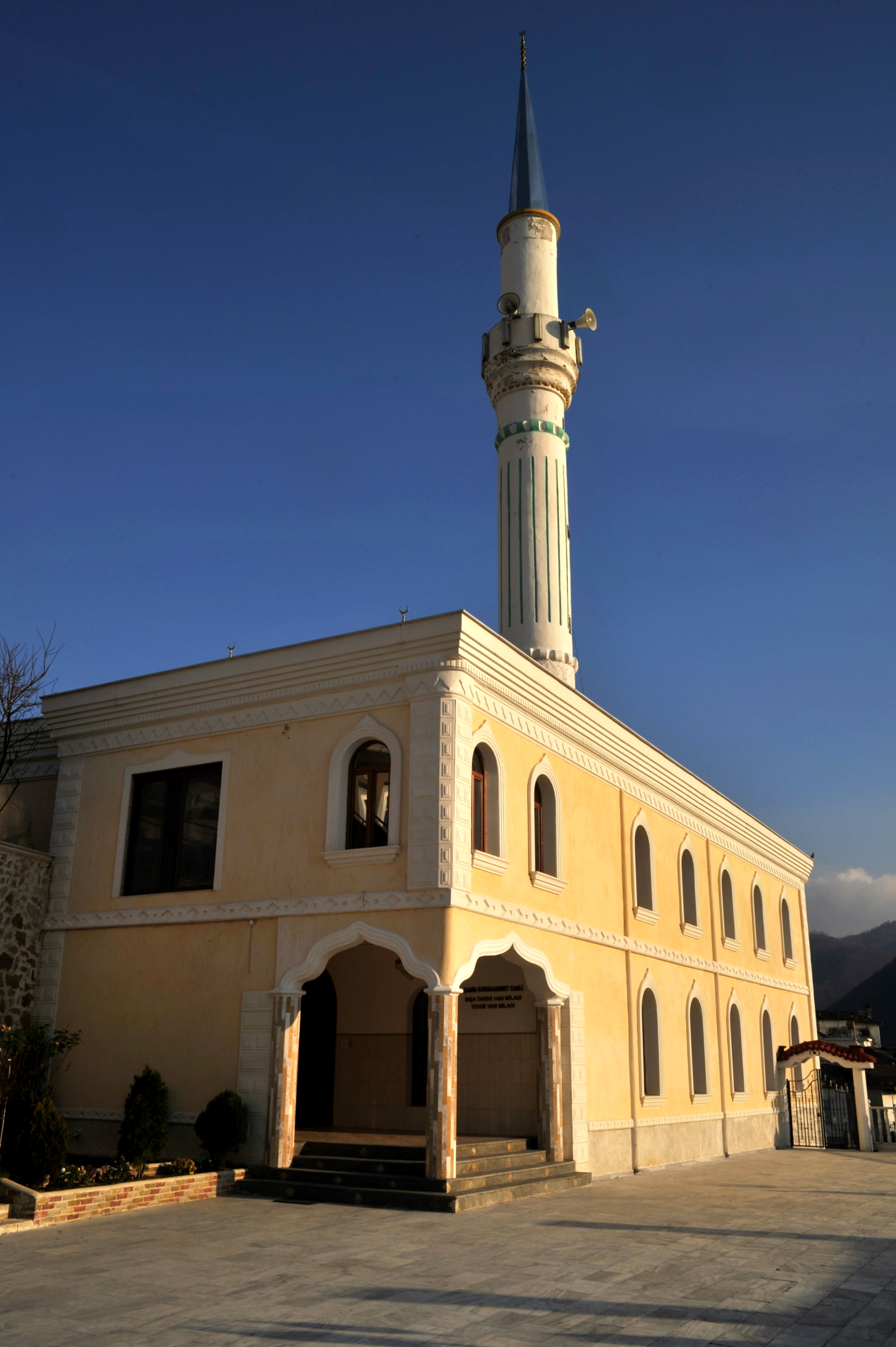
Karatza Achmet Tekke Mosque in Echinos.

According to the legend Echinos was founded during the 1360s by Lala Shahin Pasha, hence its old name Shahin.

The village is first mentioned in an Ottoman document from the middle of the 16th century. The document lists those who voluntarily took part in Ottoman military operations. According to that document 23 Muslim families and 18 single Muslims from Shahin were involved in those operations. Their incomes are also included in the document for proper taxation.

In the end of the 19th century the renowned explorer of the Rhodope Mountains St. Shishkov traveled through Shahin and wrote about the village that the people were very passionate Muslims and when one meets a woman, she turns her face aside. If you try to talk with her or ask her something, she would call her husband. He also wrote that the village was very rich and even the children used to dress in expensive clothes. The houses were two or three stories all painted in white. Shishkov describes the village more like a little town with some 200 houses.

According to Lyubomir Miletich as of 1912 Shahin was a Pomak village in the Darıdere kaza of the Ottoman Empire. According to Patriarch Cyril as of 1943 there were 417 households and 1975 inhabitants in Shahin - all Pomaks.

== Administrative division ==
The community of Echinos consists of two separate settlements:

- Melivoia (population 570)
- Echinos (population 2,210)

== Geography ==
Echinos lies on a valley of the Rhodope Mountains. It is 761 kilometers northeast of Athens, 254 kilometers northeast of Thessaloniki, and 27 kilometers north northeast of Xanthi.

== Population ==
The majority of the population of Echinos are Pomaks.

Historical population
Year	Pop.	±%
2001	2,883	—
2011	3,074	+6.6%
2021	2,780	−9.6%

== Notable people ==
- Chafiz Sophologiotatos Tzemali (born 1937-03-10) - a graduate of the Islamic University of Madinah and mufti of Komotini.
