= Karaca Ahmet Mosque =

Sunni mosque in Echinos, Greece

- Καρατζά Αχμέτ Τζαμί
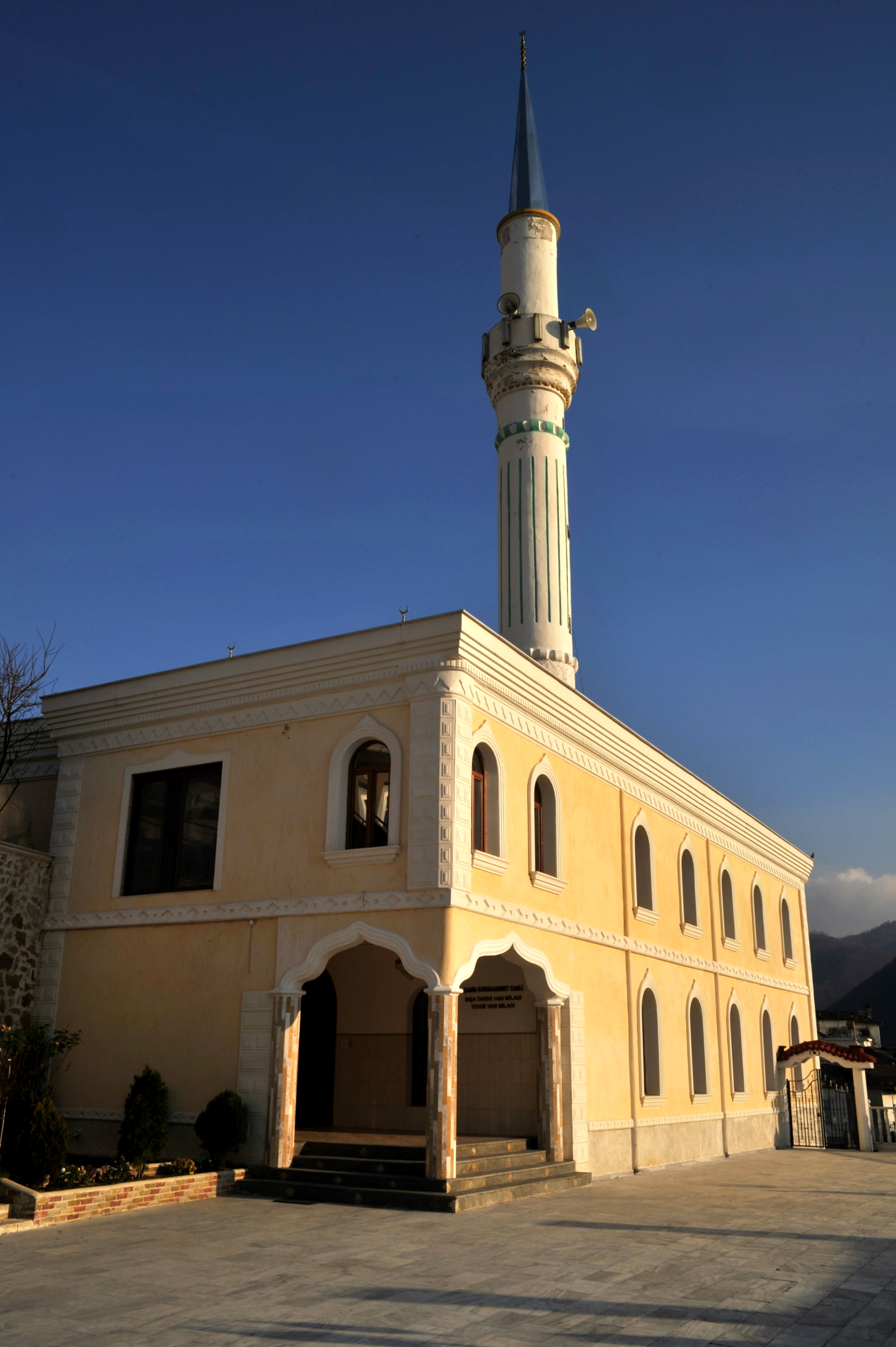
- The mosque in 2009

- Location of the mosque in Greece

Religion
- Affiliation: Islam
- Ecclesiastical or organisational status: Mosque
- Status: Open for worship

Location
- Location: Echinos, Xanthi
- Country: Greece
- Interactive map of Karaca Ahmet Mosque
- Coordinates: 41°16′34″N 24°58′22.5″E

Architecture
- Type: Mosque
- Style: Ottoman style
- Completed: 1960s

Specifications
- Dome: 18
- Minaret: 1

The Karaca Ahmet Mosque or Şahin Karaca Ahmet Mosque (Greek: Τζαμί Καρατζά Αχμέτ), also called the Tekke Mosque (Turkish: Tekke camii), is a Sunni mosque in Echinos, a small town in the Western Thrace region of northern Greece. The current mosque was built in the mid-20th century on the site of an older Ottoman-era tekke. According to the local legend, the tekke was built to honour two siblings, Karaca Ahmet and Karaca Ayşe, venerated in a saint-like manner in the town. Today it serves the Muslim community of the village.

== History ==
=== Legend ===
According to the local story, siblings Karaca Ahmet and Karaca Ayşe once visited the area and requested hospitality from the other villages, only to be denied. Finally they arrived at Echinos, where they were warmly received and offered food and shelter. By the next morning they had gone, the food in their bowls untouched. Many villagers claimed that Karaca Ahmet and Karaca Ayşe had appeared in their dreams standing on a certain spot; when they went there, they found the man's sword, and the woman's headband, slipper and pitcher. Thereafter, the two of them were venerated like saints by the Muslim community, as evidenced from their türbes (tombs) in the town.

Within the old tekke, an inscription dating to 1882 was found; as this number indicates the year the inscription was made, and not the tekke's original construction, it can be assumed that the tekke is older than that date. During the Ottoman period, the tekke hosted religious gatherings and ceremonies; there is some evidence that the complex once included a rüştiye (a type of Ottoman middle school) as well.

=== Mosque ===
The mosque was erected in the 1960s on the site of the old tekke, which incorporated the türbe of Karaca Ahmet, now located within the mosque complex (the turbe of Ayşe is also located in the town as well). Karaca Ahmet's türbe is now found on the left side of the mosque's narthex, on the mezzanine. His coffin is covered by a fabric on which verses from the Quran are woven. Judging from Ayşe's, Karaca Ahmet's tekke's original dimensions would have been about 5 × 7 m. It is one of the three in total mosques in Echinos, the other two being the Green Mosque and the Aşağı Mahalle Mosque.

== See also ==
- Islam in Greece
- List of mosques in Greece
- Ottoman Greece
- Turks of Western Thrace

== Bibliography ==
- Koca Molla, Pelin; Köse, Hamdi (October 2021). "Şahin Köyü" (PDF). Pusula (in Turkish). Greece.
- Mylonelis, Ioannis; Ziaka, Angeliki; Tsironis, Christos; Siskou, Erifili; Karakitsos, Efstratios (January 2024). "Mapping the Tekkes and Türbes in Western Thrace: A New Contribution to the Old Literature" (PDF). Journal of Balkan Studies. 4 (1). doi:10.51331/A040.
- Zenkines, Eustratios (1985). Ο Μπεκτατισμός στη Δ. Θράκη: Συμβολή στην Ιστορία της Διαδόσεως του Μουσουλμανισμού στον Ελλαδικό Χώρο [Bektashism in W. Thrace: Contribution to the History of the Spread of Islam in Greece] (Thesis) (in Greek). Aristotle University of Thessaloniki. doi:10.12681/eadd/0847. hdl:10442/hedi/0847.
