= Nicaenetus of Samos =

Greek epic and epigrammatic poet

Nicaenetus of Samos (Ancient Greek: Νικαίνετος) was a Greek epic and epigrammatic poet of the 3rd century BC. He wrote, among other things, a list of illustrious women, and epigrams. There are four epigrams of his in the Greek Anthology.

He was either an Abderite who lived in Samos island or a native Samian. Athenaeus speaks of him as either of Samos or of Abdera, and Stephanus of Byzantium mentions him among the celebrated Abderites. Athenaeus speaks of him in connection with his celebrating a Samian usage, as being a poet of strong native tendencies. From Athenaeus we infer that he lived prior to the age of Phylarchus, who wrote in 219 BC.
