= Yenidze =

Building in Dresden, Germany; formerly a cigarette factory

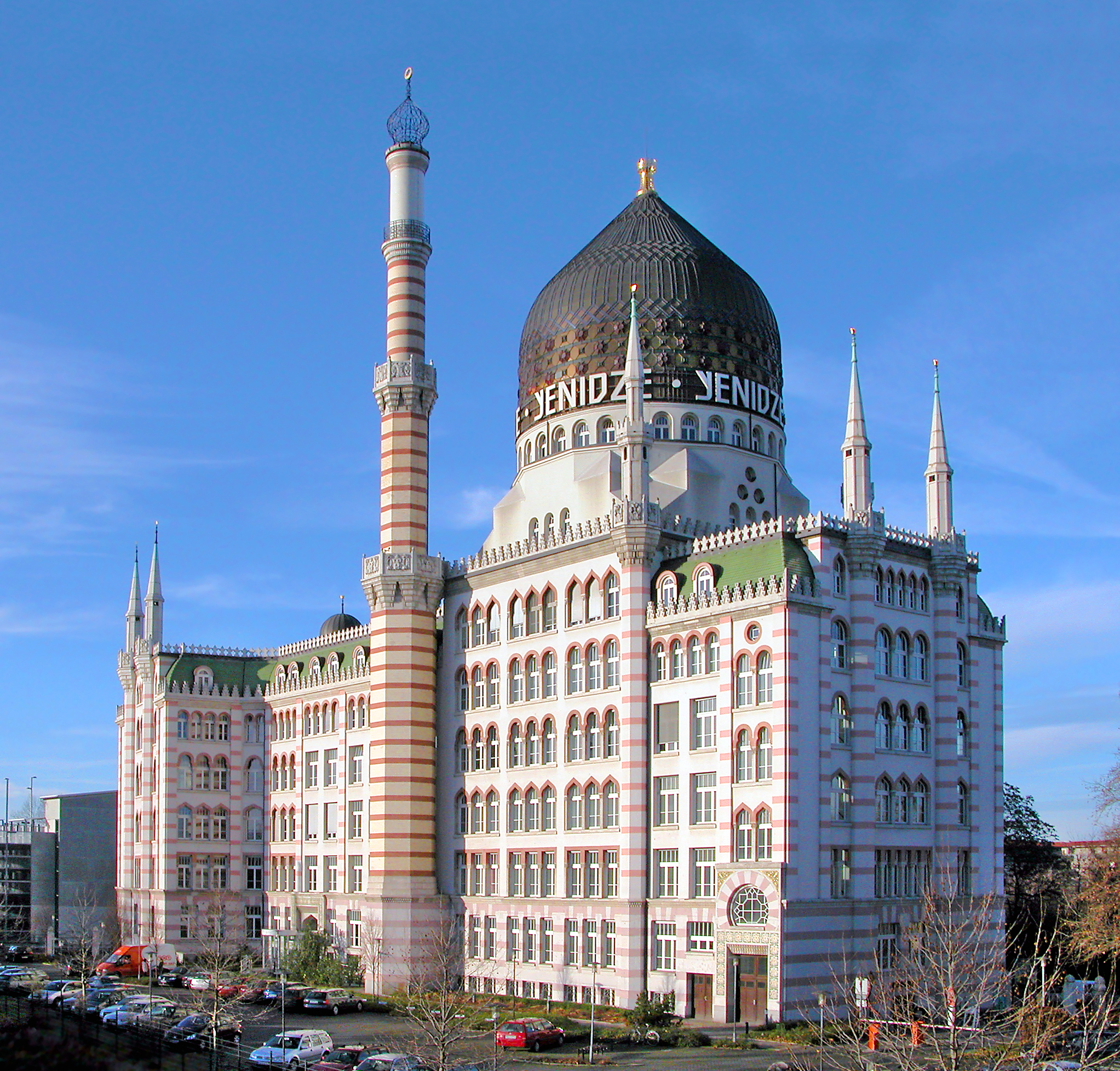
- Interactive map of the Yenidze area

General information
- Type: Former factory repurposed as office building and restaurant
- Architectural style: Moorish Revival
- Location: Germany
- Coordinates: 51°03′32″N 13°43′37″E
- Construction started: 1907
- Completed: 1909

Height
- Height: 62 m (203 ft)

Design and construction
- Architect: Martin Hammitzsch

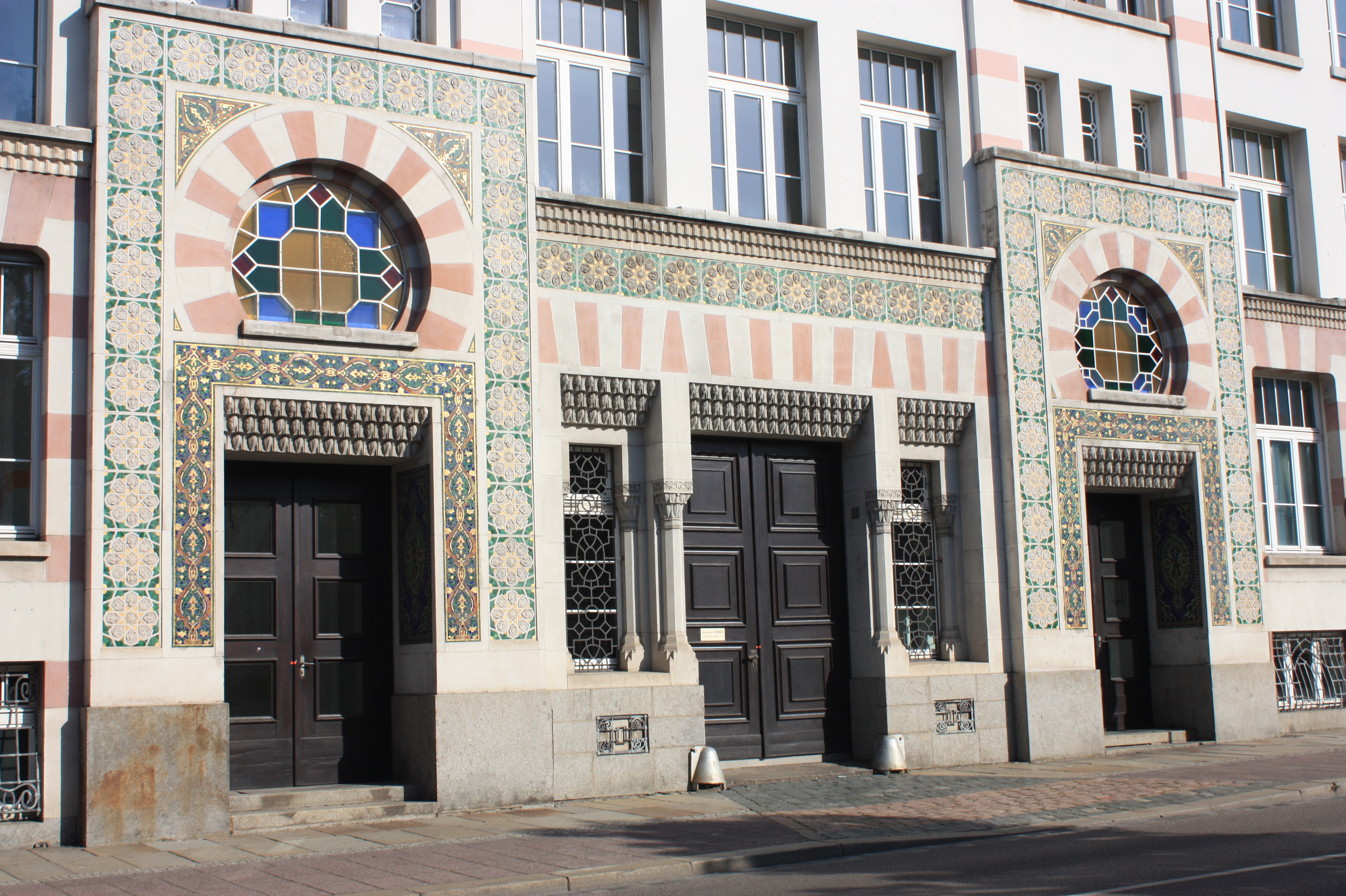
Entrance detail Yenidze cigarette factory

Yenidze is a former cigarette factory building in Dresden, Saxony, Germany built between 1907 and 1909. Today it is used as an office building. It is notable for its Moorish Revival exterior design which borrows design elements from mosques and the Alhambra in Spain.

The Yenidze Tobacco and Cigarette Factory (German: Orientalische Tabak- und Zigarettenfabrik Yenidze) was a tobacco company started by the Jewish entrepreneur Hugo Zietz, which imported tobacco from Ottoman Yenidze, Thrace (modern Genisea, Greece). The "Oriental" style of architecture recalled the exotic origins of the Oriental tobaccos it processed and functioned as advertising for the firm. It has 600 windows of various styles; the dome is 20 metres (66 ft) high. It makes great use of tiles for decoration: both complex colour patterns and unusual three-dimensional forms.

The architect Martin Hammitzsch (the second husband of Angela Hitler) designed the building in 1907. It has large, colored dome chimneys which resemble minarets. It was sometimes referred to as the "tobacco mosque" (German: Tabakmoschee), a term which is no longer officially used as the building is not a mosque. It is a unique historical feature of the city of Dresden.

In the carpet bombing of Dresden on 14/15 February 1945 most of the surrounding buildings were obliterated, but Yenidze escaped relatively unharmed, other than some loss of coloured glass in the dome. However, the building sat in isolation for several decades, and only the regrowth of Dresden in the 1990s allowed a viable restoration, once the surrounding area was also redeveloped.

The building was restored in 1996 and is now an office building.
