= Pezoula =

Pezoula Πεζούλα
- Settlement
- Location within Greece
- Coordinates: 41°0′20″N 24°57′42″E
- Country: Greece
- Administrative region: East Macedonia and Thrace
- Regional unit: Xanthi
- Municipality: Abdera
- Municipal unit: Abdera
- Community: Abdera

Population (2021)
  - Total: 66
- Time zone: UTC+2 (EET)
  - Summer (DST): UTC+3 (EEST)
- Vehicle registration: AH

Pezoula (Greek: Πεζούλα) is a settlement in the Xanthi regional unit of Greece. It is part of the community, municipal unit and municipality of Abdera. It is located approximately four kilometers from Abdera. In 2021, the settlement had 66 inhabitants.
