= Archaeological Museum of Abdera =

Archaeological museum in Abdera, Greece

Coordinates: 40°58′50″N 24°57′14″E

The Archaeological Museum of Abdera is a museum in Abdera, Greece. The museum houses archaeological artefacts found in the city which date from around 7th century BC to 13th century AD.

The museum was established in January 2000 and the building was designed by the architects Y. Polychroniou and N. Filippidis of the Directorate of Museum Studies of the Hellenic Ministry of Culture.

The museum contains three different sections. The first is public life: which includes exhibits related to religion, state organization, coinage, weights and seals and weapons. The second is Private life which includes exhibits related to the occupations of the civilians, trade and workshops, building elements, pottery, weaving, beautification, dress-coiffure and jewellery. The third is related to burial customs which includes grave markers, clay sarcophagi, ash-containers, burial offerings and reconstructions of burials. These exhibits were found in ancient cemeteries of Abdera.
