= Myrodato =

Settlement in Greece

Myrodato Μυρωδάτο
- Community
- Location within Greece
- Coordinates: 40°58′29″N 24°55′45″E
- Country: Greece
- Administrative region: Eastern Macedonia and Thrace
- Regional unit: Xanthi
- Municipality: Abdera
- Municipal unit: Abdera

Population (2021)
  - Community: 402
- Time zone: UTC+2 (EET)
  - Summer (DST): UTC+3 (EEST)

Myrodato (Greek: Μυρωδάτο) is a settlement in the Abdera municipal unit, Xanthi regional unit of Greece. It is located 2 kilometres (1.2 mi) west of Abdera. Its population was 402 at the 2021 census. In 1981, the settlement had a population of around 668, and in 1991 about 671.

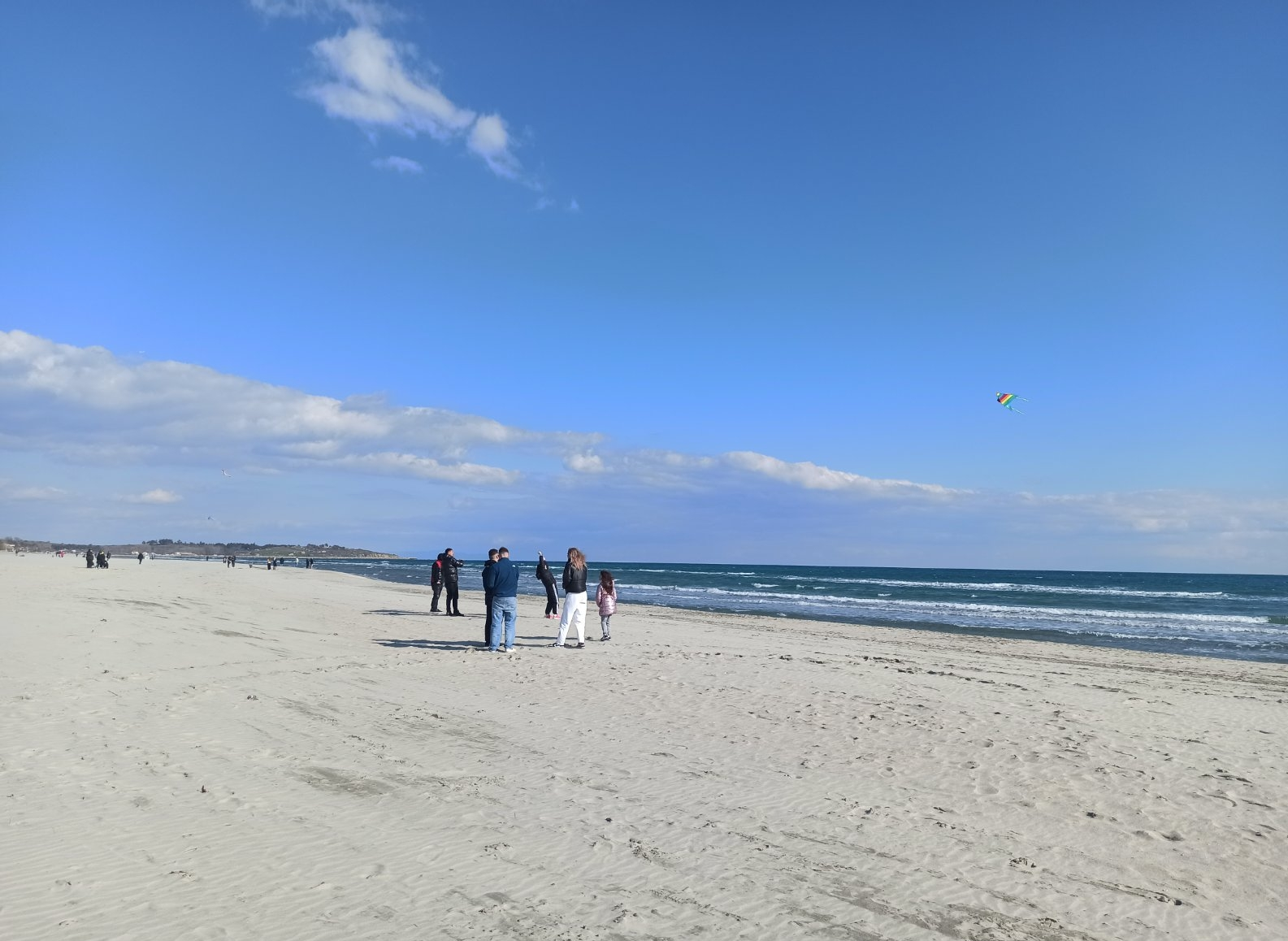
The beach of Mirodato

Myrodato beach is 7 kilometres (4.3 mi) away from the village of Myrodato.
