= Mandra, Xanthi =

Regional municipal settlement

Mandra Μάνδρα
- Community
- Location within Greece
- Coordinates: 40°59′42″N 24°59′35″E
- Country: Greece
- Administrative region: Eastern Macedonia and Thrace
- Regional unit: Xanthi
- Municipality: Abdera
- Municipal unit: Abdera

Population (2021)
  - Community: 498
- Time zone: UTC+2 (EET)
  - Summer (DST): UTC+3 (EEST)

Mandra (Greek: Μάνδρα) is a settlement in the Abdera municipal unit, Xanthi regional unit of Greece.
