= Kastanitis =

Regional unit settlement

Coordinates: 41°15′N 24°42′E

Kastanitis (Greek: Καστανίτης) is a settlement in the Xanthi regional unit of Greece. It is part of the community Karyofyto. Before the population exchange between Greece and Turkey in 1923, Kastanitis was inhabited by Turks. The name of the village is derived from the numerous chestnut trees present in the area. At one time, the local school at Kastanitis was able to provide education to 76 students. The population of Kastanitis in 1920 was around 281 inhabitants. In 1961, the population dramatically dropped to around 127 inhabitants and by 1971, there were only 24 inhabitants in the village.
