= Oraio =

Village in Greece

Oraio Ωραίο
- Community
- Location within Greece
- Coordinates: 41°16′26″N 24°50′02″E
- Country: Greece
- Administrative region: Eastern Macedonia and Thrace
- Regional unit: Xanthi
- Municipality: Myki
- Municipal unit: Myki

Population (2021)
  - Community: 811
- Time zone: UTC+2 (EET)
  - Summer (DST): UTC+3 (EEST)

Oraio (Greek: Ωραίο, romanized: Oraío, Bulgarian: Брещене, Орайово) is a settlement in the municipality Myki in the Xanthi regional unit of Greece. Oraio is a Pomak Muslim majority village. It was founded in the 12th century AD, when its population was still Bulgarian Christian. The conversion to Islam occurred during the period 17th-18th century. Following the First Balkan War, Bulgaria took possession of Oraio in 1912, but after a period of eight months it was taken back by the Greek army. Shortly thereafter, as part of the accords concluding the Balkan Wars, Oraio and Western Thrace were ceded to Bulgaria and remained a part of the latter until the end of World War I. Following the Bulgarian defeat in this war, Western Thrace, and thus Oraio, was given to Greece in the second half of April 1920 at San Remo conference of the prime ministers of the main allies of the Entente powers (except the US). Later in 1923 it was left to Greece with the rest of Western Thrace region by the Treaty of Lausanne. It was occupied by Bulgaria in the period 1941–1944 during World War II. Later in 1944 it was left to Greece.

In the 2021 census, Oraio had a population of 811, the majority of whom are Pomaks. The father of American actress and producer Rita Wilson was originally from Oraio.
