= Gerakas, Xanthi =

Community in Xanthi, Greece

Gerakas Γέρακας
- Community
- Location within Greece
- Coordinates: 41°11′48″N 24°49′32″E
- Country: Greece
- Administrative region: Eastern Macedonia and Thrace
- Regional unit: Xanthi
- Municipality: Xanthi
- Municipal unit: Stavroupoli

Population (2021)
  - Community: 270
- Time zone: UTC+2 (EET)
  - Summer (DST): UTC+3 (EEST)

Gerakas (Greek: Γέρακας, previously known as Atmantzeli) is a community in the Xanthi regional unit of Greece. It is part of the municipal unit of Stavroupoli. It is located 14 kilometers east of Stavroupoli and 14 kilometers northwest of Xanthi. The community consists of the settlements Gerakas, Isaia, Mega Evmoiro (formerly known as Emerli), Orestini and Pilima.

== Population history ==
Year	Village population	Community population
1981	-	631
1991	47	-
2001	26	381
2011	31	297
2021	40	270
