= George Papassavas =

Greek-American painter (born 1924)

George Papassavas (born 28 January 1924) is a Greek painter who has traveled extensively throughout Latin America.

== Life and career ==
Born in Stavroupoli, Greece, Papassavas against his father's will taught himself the techniques of the classical artist at a young age. At the age of 17, he was put into exile and forced into labor by the invading Bulgarian army. After his return to Greece, he began formal study at the Athens School of Fine Arts. In 1955, after being enchanted by the book Brazil: A Land of the Future by Stefan Zweig, Papassavas journeyed with his wife to Rio de Janeiro, Brazil, where he studied under Candido Portinari. In search of artistic inspiration, Papassavas made several trips throughout South America observing both its people and natural environment. At the end of 1967, he moved to United States and continued his development in art at Harvard University.

The end of 1974, Papassavas moved to Florida, where he became a U.S. citizen in 1978. To this day he still paints. He and his wife currently divide their time between Florida, Maine, and Massachusetts. He has numerous one man and group shows throughout Europe, South America, and the United States. His work is included in museums, libraries, and both private and corporate collections. His art has also been featured in many newspapers, magazines, and books.

Bold outlines and warm colors characterize his dominate style in painting.

== General references ==
- Artists of Florida. George Papassavas, page 155–6. Alto, New Mexico: Mountain Productions of Texas, 1992.
- Who's Who On The Arts, page 149. Miami, Florida: Jayell Publishing Company Publication, First Library Edition 1971–1972.
- Who's Who On The Arts, page 109 & 117. Miami, Florida: Jayell Publishing Company Publication, Secondary Library Edition 1971-1972
