= Sminthi =

Village in Xanthi, Greece

Coordinates: 41°13′50″N 24°52′46″E

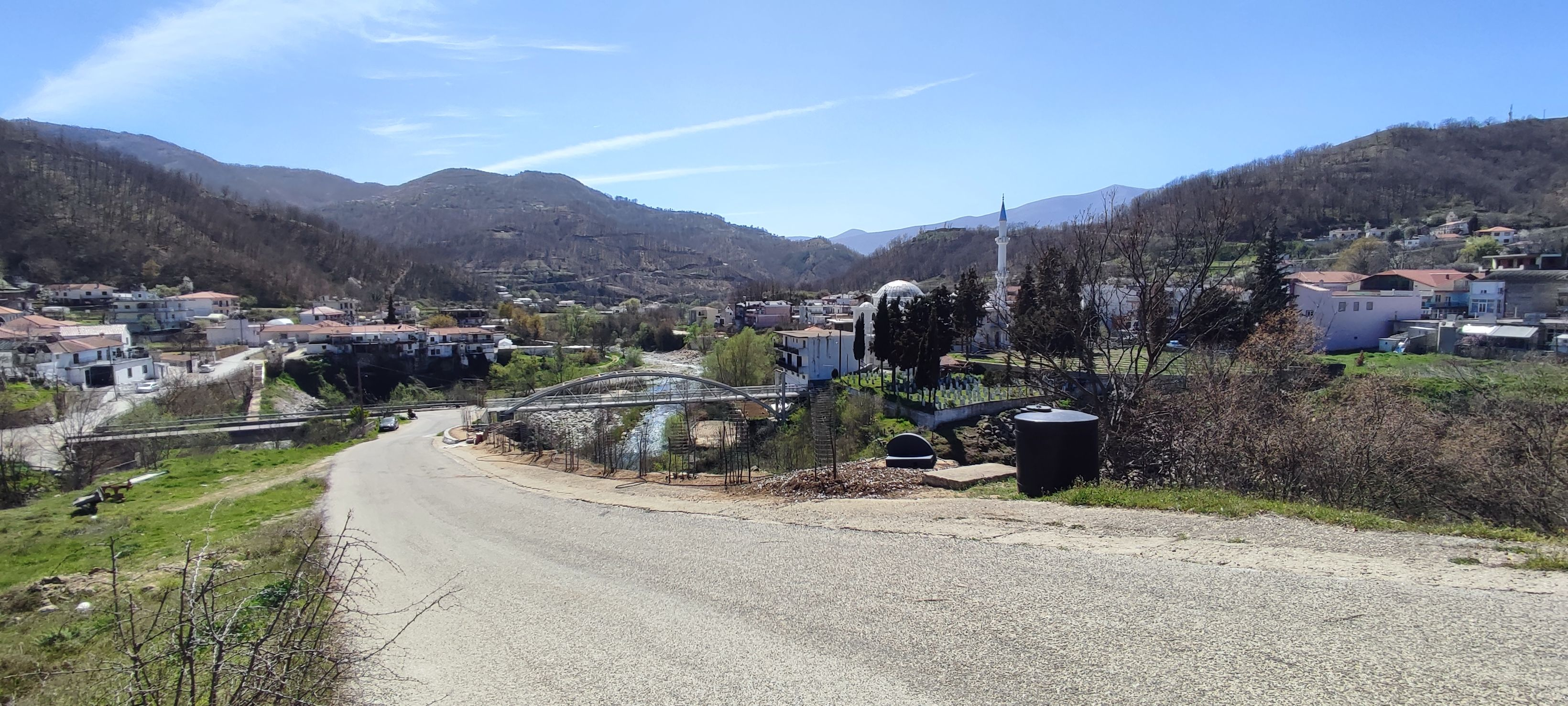
Sminthi in 2024

Sminthi (Greek: Σμίνθη) is a village in the Xanthi regional unit of Greece. It is the seat of the municipality Myki. In 1991, the village contained around 323 inhabitants. In 2001, the number of inhabitants in Sminthi increased to 363. The postal code of Sminthi is 67100 and its telephone access code is +3025410. Sminthi is at an altitude of 250 meters.
