= Melivoia, Xanthi =

Melivoia
- Settlement
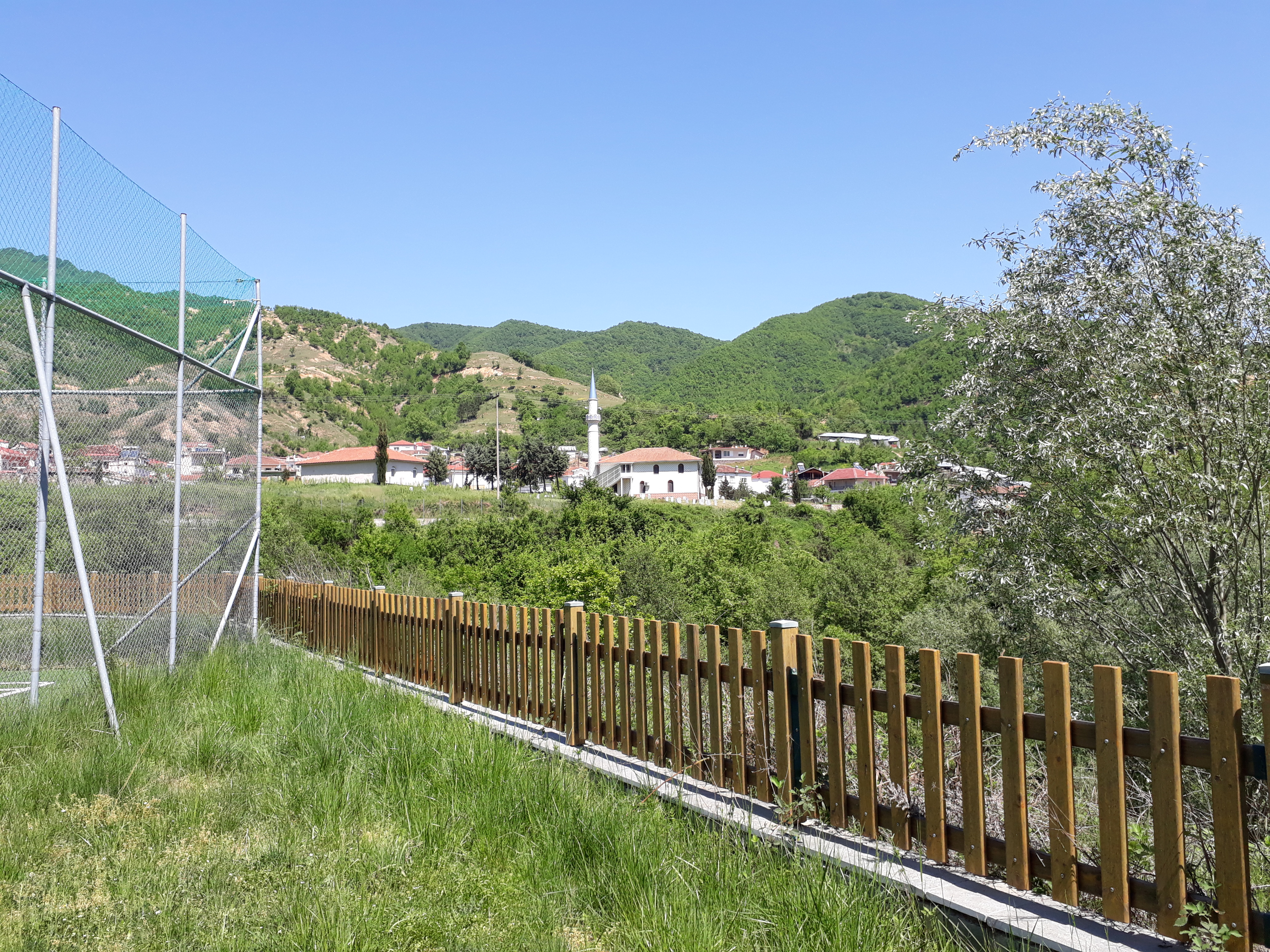
- View of Melivoia

- Location within Greece
- Coordinates: 41.32839°N 24.930596°E
- Country: Greece
- Administrative region: East Macedonia and Thrace
- Regional unit: Xanthi
- Municipality: Myki
- Municipal unit: Myki
- Community: Echinos

Population (2021)
  - Total: 570
- Time zone: UTC+2 (EET)
  - Summer (DST): UTC+3 (EEST)

Melivoia (Greek: Μελίβοια) is a settlement in the Xanthi regional unit of Greece and one of the larger villages of the municipality of Myki. It is about 738 km north of Athens, the country's capital, in the region of East Macedonia and Thrace.

The area has two airports, the nearest being Alexander the Great International Airport (IATA: KVA), 75.8 km southwest of Melivoia's center.

== Population ==
Year	Population
1991	671
2001	651
2011	588
2021	570
