= Agios Athanasios, Xanthi =

Settlement in Xanthi, Greece

Coordinates: 41.04°N 24.783°E

Agios Athanasios (Greek: Άγιος Αθανάσιος) is a settlement in the Xanthi regional unit of Greece. It is part of the municipality of Topeiros, and the community Toxotes.
