= Pigadia, Xanthi =

Pigadia Πηγάδια
- Community
- Location within Greece
- Coordinates: 41°7′N 24°57′E
- Country: Greece
- Administrative region: East Macedonia and Thrace
- Regional unit: Xanthi
- Municipality: Avdira
- Municipal unit: Vistonida

Population (2021)
  - Community: 370
- Time zone: UTC+2 (EET)
  - Summer (DST): UTC+3 (EEST)
- Postal code: 67150

Pigadia (Greek: Πηγάδια) is a settlement in the Vistonida municipal unit, Xanthi regional unit of Greece. It is located north of Genisea and approximately 9 kilometers southeast of Xanthi.

== Population ==
Historical population
Year	Pop.	±%
1981	567	—
1991	634	+11.8%
2001	487	−23.2%
2011	511	+4.9%
2021	370	−27.6%
