= Olvio =

Regional municipality settlement

Olvio Όλβιο
- Community
- Location within Greece
- Coordinates: 41°01′44″N 24°47′56″E
- Country: Greece
- Administrative region: Eastern Macedonia and Thrace
- Regional unit: Xanthi
- Municipality: Topeiros

Population (2021)
  - Community: 286
- Time zone: UTC+2 (EET)
  - Summer (DST): UTC+3 (EEST)

Olvio (Greek: Όλβιο) is a settlement in the municipality Topeiros in the Xanthi regional unit of Greece. It is located six kilometers north of Evlalos and 24 kilometers northeast of Xanthi. In 2021, the population of Olvio was 286 inhabitants.
