= Kotyli =

Kotyli Κοτύλη
- Municipal unit
- Location within the regional unit

- Location within Greece
- Coordinates: 41°20′N 24°53′E
- Country: Greece
- Administrative region: East Macedonia and Thrace
- Regional unit: Xanthi
- Municipality: Myki

Area
  - Municipal unit: 79.1 km^{2} (30.5 sq mi)
- Elevation: 708 m (2,323 ft)

Population (2021)
  - Municipal unit: 2,031
  - Municipal unit density: 25.7/km^{2} (66.5/sq mi)
- Time zone: UTC+2 (EET)
  - Summer (DST): UTC+3 (EEST)
- Vehicle registration: AH

Kotyli (Greek: Κοτύλη, romanized: Kotýli, Turkish: Kozluca, Bulgarian: Козлуджа, Kozludža) is a former community in the Xanthi regional unit, East Macedonia and Thrace, Greece. Since the 2011 local government reform, it has been part of the municipality Myki, of which it is a municipal unit. The municipal unit has an area of 79.119 km^{2} and a population of 2,031 (2021). The community consists of the settlements Kotyli, Aimoni, Dimari and Pachni.

== See also ==
- List of settlements in the Xanthi regional unit
