= Exochi, Xanthi =

Topeiros, Xanthi community

Exochi Εξοχή
- Community
- Location within Greece
- Coordinates: 41°02′N 24°52′E
- Country: Greece
- Administrative region: Eastern Macedonia and Thrace
- Regional unit: Xanthi
- Municipality: Topeiros

Population (2021)
  - Community: 979
- Time zone: UTC+2 (EET)
  - Summer (DST): UTC+3 (EEST)

Exochi (Greek: Εξοχή) is a community in the municipality Topeiros in the Xanthi regional unit of Greece. It consists of the settlements Exochi, Vaniano, Gkizela, Dafni, Kossos, Kypseli, Melissa and Nea Amisos.
