= Galani, Xanthi =

Community in Topeiros, Xanthi, Greece

Galani Γαλάνη
- Community
- Location within Greece
- Coordinates: 41°5.6′N 24°46.5′E
- Country: Greece
- Administrative region: Eastern Macedonia and Thrace
- Regional unit: Xanthi
- Municipality: Topeiros

Population (2021)
  - Community: 98
- Time zone: UTC+2 (EET)
  - Summer (DST): UTC+3 (EEST)

Galani (Greek: Γαλάνη) is a community in the municipality Topeiros in the Xanthi regional unit of Greece. The community consists of the settlements Galani, Ano Livera, Kato Livera and Imera, all on the left bank of the river Nestos.
