= Kimmeria =

Kimmeria Κιμμέρια
- Community
- Kimmeria

- Location within Greece
- Coordinates: 41°09′N 24°56′E
- Country: Greece
- Administrative region: East Macedonia and Thrace
- Regional unit: Xanthi
- Municipality: Xanthi
- Municipal unit: Xanthi

Population (2021)
  - Community: 3,771
- Time zone: UTC+2 (EET)
  - Summer (DST): UTC+3 (EEST)
- Vehicle registration: ΑΗ

Kimmeria (Greek: Κιμμέρια, previously known as Koyiounkoi, Turkish: Koyunköy) is a community in the municipality Xanthi in the Xanthi regional unit of Greece. It is located 740 kilometers from Athens, 233 kilometers from Thessalonica, and 5 kilometers east of Xanthi. The community consists of the settlements Kimmeria, Alikochori, Anthiro, Askyra, Gialistero, Eranos, Ketiki, Livadi, Panepistimioupoli (Campus of Democritus University of Thrace), Pelekito, Porta, Prioni and Ydrochori, many of which are deserted.

== Population ==
Historical population
Year	Pop.	±%
1981	3,588	—
1991	2,627	−26.8%
2001	3,529	+34.3%
2011	3,898	+10.5%
2021	3,771	−3.3%
