= Dafnonas =

Settlement in Xanthi, Greece

Dafnonas Δαφνώνας
- Community
- Location within Greece
- Coordinates: 41°13′08″N 24°40′23″E
- Country: Greece
- Administrative region: Eastern Macedonia and Thrace
- Regional unit: Xanthi
- Municipality: Xanthi
- Municipal unit: Stavroupoli

Population (2021)
  - Community: 235
- Time zone: UTC+2 (EET)
  - Summer (DST): UTC+3 (EEST)

Dafnonas (Greek: Δαφνώνας) is a settlement in the municipality of Xanthi in the Xanthi regional unit of Greece. It is part of the municipal unit of Stavroupoli.
