= Neochori, Xanthi =

Community in Xanthi, Greece

Neochori Νεοχώρι
- Community
- Location within Greece
- Coordinates: 41°13′N 24°38′E
- Country: Greece
- Administrative region: Eastern Macedonia and Thrace
- Regional unit: Xanthi
- Municipality: Xanthi
- Municipal unit: Stavroupoli

Population (2021)
  - Community: 274
- Time zone: UTC+2 (EET)
  - Summer (DST): UTC+3 (EEST)

Neochori (Greek: Νεοχώρι) is a community in the municipality of Xanthi in the Xanthi regional unit of Greece. It is part of the municipal unit of Stavroupoli. It consists of the settlements of Neochori, Ioniko, Kalyva, Kato Ioniko, Sidiropetra and Stavrochori.
