= Karyofyto =

Community in Xanthi, Greece

Karyofyto Καρυόφυτο
- Community
- Location within Greece
- Coordinates: 41°15′37″N 24°39′48″E
- Country: Greece
- Administrative region: Eastern Macedonia and Thrace
- Regional unit: Xanthi
- Municipality: Xanthi
- Municipal unit: Stavroupoli

Population (2021)
  - Community: 137
- Time zone: UTC+2 (EET)
  - Summer (DST): UTC+3 (EEST)

Karyofyto (Greek: Καρυόφυτο, previously known as Kozloutsa) is a community in the municipality Xanthi in the Xanthi regional unit of Greece. It is part of the municipal unit of Stavroupoli. It is located north northwest of Stavroupoli and 40 kilometers southeast of Xanthi. The community consists of the villages Ano Karyofyto, Kato Karyofyto, Kastanitis and Leivaditis. In 2021, the population of the community was 137.
