= Satres =

Satres Σάτρες Sinikova
- Municipal unit
- Location within the regional unit

- Location within Greece
- Coordinates: 41°15′N 25°03′E
- Country: Greece
- Administrative region: East Macedonia and Thrace
- Regional unit: Xanthi
- Municipality: Myki

Area
  - Municipal unit: 149.3 km^{2} (57.6 sq mi)
- Elevation: 347 m (1,138 ft)

Population (2021)
  - Municipal unit: 272
  - Municipal unit density: 1.82/km^{2} (4.72/sq mi)
- Time zone: UTC+2 (EET)
  - Summer (DST): UTC+3 (EEST)
- Postal code: 673 00
- Vehicle registration: AH

Satres (Greek: Σάτρες, Bulgarian: Синиково, romanized: Sinikovo, Turkish: Sinikova) is a former community in the Xanthi regional unit, East Macedonia and Thrace, Greece. Since the 2011 local government reform it is part of the municipality Myki, of which it is a municipal unit. The municipal unit has an area of 149.327 km^{2}. Population 272 (2021). The community Satres consists of the settlements Satres, Akraios, Gidotopos, Dourgouti, Kalotycho, Koundouros, Lykotopos, Polyskio, Potamochori, Rematia, Temenos and Tsalapeteinos.
