= Selero =

Selero Σέλερο
- Municipal unit

- Location within the regional unit

- Location within Greece
- Coordinates: 41°08′N 25°00′E
- Country: Greece
- Administrative region: East Macedonia and Thrace
- Regional unit: Xanthi
- Municipality: Abdera

Area
  - Municipal unit: 30.6 km^{2} (11.8 sq mi)

Population (2021)
  - Municipal unit: 5,081
  - Municipal unit density: 166/km^{2} (430/sq mi)
- Time zone: UTC+2 (EET)
  - Summer (DST): UTC+3 (EEST)
- Vehicle registration: AH

Selero (Greek: Σέλερο; Turkish: Gökçeler) is a village and a former community in the Xanthi regional unit, East Macedonia and Thrace, Greece. Since the 2011 local government reform it is part of the municipality Abdera, of which it is a municipal unit. The municipal unit has an area of 30.565 km^{2}. Population 5,081 (2021).
