= Evmoiro =

Community in Xanthi, Greece

Evmoiro Εύμοιρο
- Community
- Location within Greece
- Coordinates: 41°07′N 24°52′E
- Country: Greece
- Administrative region: Eastern Macedonia and Thrace
- Regional unit: Xanthi
- Municipality: Xanthi
- Municipal unit: Xanthi

Population (2021)
  - Community: 2,709
- Time zone: UTC+2 (EET)
  - Summer (DST): UTC+3 (EEST)

Evmoiro (Greek: Εύμοιρο) is a community in the municipality of Xanthi, northern Greece. It consists of the settlements Evmoiro, Kallithea, Lamprino, Lefki, Nea Morsini, Palaia Morsini and Petrochori (Turkish: Kayalar).
