= Toxotes, Xanthi =

Toxotes Τοξότες
- Community
- Location within Greece
- Coordinates: 41°05′13″N 24°46′59″E
- Country: Greece
- Administrative region: East Macedonia and Thrace
- Regional unit: Xanthi
- Municipality: Topeiros
- Municipal unit: Topeiros

Population (2021)
  - Community: 1,484
- Time zone: UTC+2 (EET)
  - Summer (DST): UTC+3 (EEST)

Toxotes (Greek: Τοξότες, Bulgarian: Окчилар, Turkish: Okçular) is a settlement and a community in the Xanthi regional unit of Greece, part of the municipality Topeiros. It is located approximately 13.9 kilometers from Xanthi and 1 kilometer east of the river Nestos. In 2021, the population was 1,484 for the community. In 1981, the population of the settlement was around 2,198 inhabitants. In 1991, the number of people in Toxotes dropped to 802 inhabitants. The community consists of the settlements Toxotes, Agios Athanasios, Thalassia, Kosmiti, Megalo Tympano, Mikro Tympano, Poimni and Semeli.

Toxotes has a station on the Thessaloniki–Alexandroupoli railway.
