= Paschalia =

Settlement in Xanthi, Greece

Paschalia Πασχαλιά
- Community
- Location within Greece
- Coordinates: 41°13′59″N 24°34′59″E
- Country: Greece
- Administrative region: Eastern Macedonia and Thrace
- Regional unit: Xanthi
- Municipality: Xanthi
- Municipal unit: Stavroupoli

Population (2021)
  - Community: 82
- Time zone: UTC+2 (EET)
  - Summer (DST): UTC+3 (EEST)

Paschalia (Greek: Πασχαλιά) is a settlement in the municipality Xanthi in the Xanthi regional unit of Greece. It is part of the municipal unit of Stavroupoli.
