= Stavroupoli, Xanthi =

Village in Thrace, Greece

Stavroupoli Σταυρούπολη
- Municipal unit
- Stavroupoli

- Location within Greece
- Coordinates: 41°12′N 24°42′E
- Country: Greece
- Administrative region: East Macedonia and Thrace
- Regional unit: Xanthi
- Municipality: Xanthi

Area
  - Municipal unit: 342.0 km^{2} (132.0 sq mi)
- Elevation: 132 m (433 ft)

Population (2021)
  - Municipal unit: 1,635
  - Municipal unit density: 4.781/km^{2} (12.38/sq mi)
  - Community: 420
- Time zone: UTC+2 (EET)
  - Summer (DST): UTC+3 (EEST)
- Vehicle registration: AH

Stavroupoli (Greek: Σταυρούπολη) is a village and a former municipality in the Xanthi regional unit, East Macedonia and Thrace, Greece. Since the 2011 local government reform it is part of the municipality Xanthi, of which it is a municipal unit. The municipal unit has an area of 342.002 km^{2}. Population 1,635 (2021). Stavroupoli and Nestos Valley (Greek: Κοιλάδα του Νέστου) including Nestos River Tempi (Greek: Τέμπη του Νέστου) is a popular tour region and vacation target in North Greece.

The municipal unit Stavroupoli is subdivided into the communities Dafnonas, Gerakas, Karyofyto, Komnina, Neochori, Paschalia and Stavroupoli. The community Stavroupoli consists of the settlements Stavroupoli, Lykodromi, Kallithea and Margariti.

== History ==
During the Bulgarian administration of the region in World War II from 1941 to 1944, the village was infamous as the location of the Krastopole or Enikyoy concentration camp where Bulgarian Communist Party and other left-wing enemies of the ruling regime were interned.

== Names ==
Under Ottoman rule, the Ottoman Turkish name of the village was يڭى كوى Yeni Köy (in Greek, Γενή Κιόι, in Bulgarian Еникьой Enikyoy) 'New Village'. The Bulgarian name was Bulgarian: Кръстополе, romanized: Krastopole, lit. 'cross field'.

Its name was Hellenized as Greek: Σταυρούπολις, romanized: Stavroupolis, lit. 'Cross city' in May, 1920, soon after it was ceded to Greece.

== Notable people ==
- George Papassavas (1924) painter
- Katerina Sakellaropoulou (1956) The first female president of Hellenic republic
