= Komnina, Xanthi =

Komnina Κομνηνά
- Community
- Location within Greece
- Coordinates: 41°10′3″N 24°43′38″E
- Country: Greece
- Administrative region: East Macedonia and Thrace
- Regional unit: Xanthi
- Municipality: Xanthi
- Municipal unit: Stavroupoli

Population (2021)
  - Community: 217
- Time zone: UTC+2 (EET)
  - Summer (DST): UTC+3 (EEST)

Komnina (Greek: Κομνηνά) is a settlement in the municipal unit of Stavroupoli of the municipality of Xanthi in the Xanthi regional unit of Greece. It is located 9 kilometers southeast of Stavroupoli and 31.5 kilometers from Xanthi.

== Population ==
Historical population
Year	Pop.	±%
1981	365	—
1991	443	+21.4%
2001	276	−37.7%
2011	261	−5.4%
2021	217	−16.9%
