= Nea Kessani =

Settlement in Abdera, Xanthi, Greece

Nea Kessani Νέα Κεσσάνη
- Community
- Location within Greece
- Coordinates: 41°02′N 25°04′E
- Country: Greece
- Administrative region: Eastern Macedonia and Thrace
- Regional unit: Xanthi
- Municipality: Abdera
- Municipal unit: Abdera

Population (2021)
  - Community: 727
- Time zone: UTC+2 (EET)
  - Summer (DST): UTC+3 (EEST)

Nea Kessani (Greek: Νέα Κεσσάνη) is a settlement in the Abdera municipal unit, Xanthi regional unit of Greece.

Nea Kessani is one of the few remaining villages in Greece that still celebrates Gynekokratia (female dominance or matriarchy) every year. On 8 January, the women go out to the cafeneons whilst the men stay home and look after the children, before joining together in celebration in the evening.
