= Genisea =

Town in Western Thrace, Greece

Genisea Γενισέα
- Community
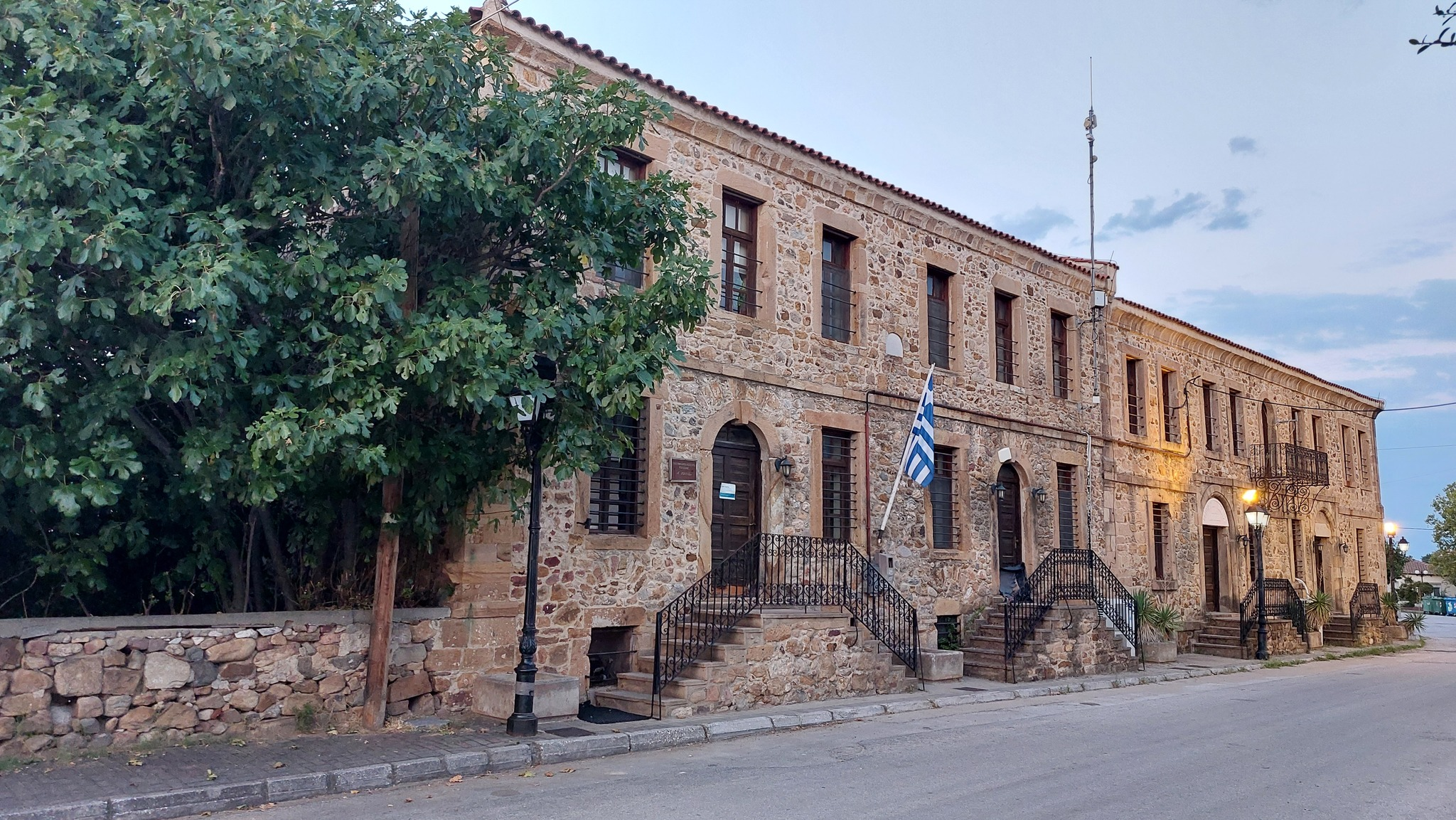
- The cultural centre of Genisea

- Location within Greece
- Coordinates: 41°04′N 24°58′E
- Country: Greece
- Administrative region: East Macedonia and Thrace
- Regional unit: Xanthi
- Municipality: Abdera
- Municipal unit: Vistonida

Population (2021)
  - Community: 2,049
- Time zone: UTC+2 (EET)
  - Summer (DST): UTC+3 (EEST)
- Vehicle registration: AH

Genisea (Greek: Γενισέα) is a town in the Vistonida municipal unit, within the municipality of Abdera in the Xanthi regional unit of Greece. It is the seat of the municipality Abdera. According to the 2021 census, the population of Genisea was 2,049 inhabitants.

== History ==
Genisea was ruled by the Ottoman Empire from 1478 to 1912, and was known as Yenice; more specifically Karasu Yenicesi (after the Nestos River, Mesta Karasu) or Tütün Yenicesi ('tobacco'), to distinguish it from Yenice-i Vardar (modern Giannitsa). In a tahrir defter of 1454–1455, it is recorded as Yenicepazar. According to this record, the town was divided into nine quarters and had 154 Muslim Turkish households, and about 700 people in total; seven of whom were imams, indicating the existence of seven mosques. There were no Christians in the town, and it remained a purely Muslim city for centuries. In the Ottoman tax registry of 1519 (Hijri 925) the town was recorded as Yenice-i Karasu, and was inhabited only by Muslims (215 households and 124 bachelors); it was in the jurisdiction of Kasım Paşa, and it was also a hass, directly owned by the Sultan. According to the accounting defter of 1530 (Hijri 936), which contains the records from ten years prior, there were 204 Muslim households (approximately 1,000 people), and the town was recorded as Yenice-i Karasu. There were also some Christians in the villages of the kaza, where Genisea was the administrative center. The district had 110 villages consisting of 3,022 Muslim and 1,729 Christian households; most of the Christians lived in ten large villages. In the tahrir defter of 1568–1569 (Hijri 976), the town was included in the Süleymaniye Mosque vakif in Istanbul. At that time, there were 223 Muslim households and 88 bachelors (1200 people in total) in the town, and no Christians.

Under the spellings "Yenidje" or "Yenidze", Genisea was famous for its superior Oriental tobacco, especially suited for cigarettes. It lent its name to the Yenidze tobacco factory building in Dresden and to the British Yenidje Tobacco Company Limited.

== See also ==
- Vafeika
