= Myki, Greece =

Myki Μύκη
- Municipality
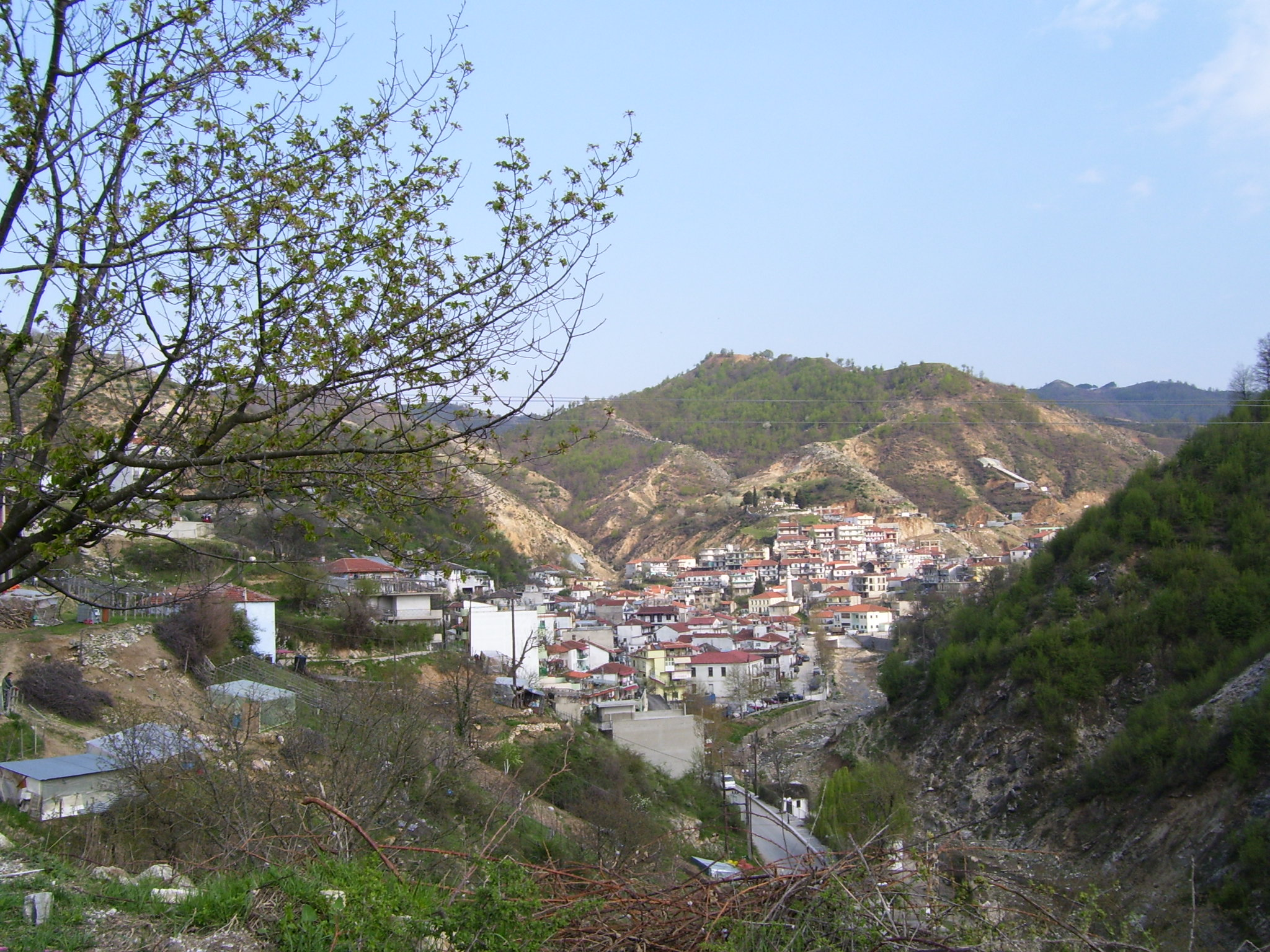
- View of Myki town

- Location within Greece
- Coordinates: 41°15′N 24°55′E
- Country: Greece
- Administrative region: Eastern Macedonia and Thrace
- Regional unit: Xanthi

Government
  - Mayor: Achmet Kiourt (since 2023)

Area
  - Municipality: 633.3 km^{2} (244.5 sq mi)
  - Municipal unit: 314.9 km^{2} (121.6 sq mi)
- Elevation: 499 m (1,637 ft)

Population (2021)
  - Municipality: 14,237
  - Density: 22.48/km^{2} (58.22/sq mi)
  - Municipal unit: 11,288
  - Municipal unit density: 35.85/km^{2} (92.84/sq mi)
  - Community: 7,697
- Time zone: UTC+2 (EET)
  - Summer (DST): UTC+3 (EEST)
- Vehicle registration: AH

Myki (Greek: Μύκη, romanized: Mýki, Bulgarian: Мустафчово, Mustafčovo, Turkish: Mustafçova) is a municipality in the Xanthi regional unit, Greece. The seat of the municipality is in Sminthi. The majority of the population in the municipality are members of the Muslim minority.

== Municipality ==
The municipality Myki was formed at the 2011 local government reform by the merger of the following 4 former municipalities, that became municipal units:

- Kotyli
- Myki
- Satres
- Thermes

The municipality has an area of 633.334 km^{2}, the municipal unit 314.874 km^{2}. The population of the municipality Myki was 14,237 as of 2021. The main villages of the municipal unit are Sminthi, Alma, Glafki, Kentavros, Myki, Echinos, Melivoia and Oraio.
