= Vistonida =

Vistonida Βιστωνίδα
- Municipal unit
- Location within the regional unit

- Location within Greece
- Coordinates: 41°04′N 24°59′E
- Country: Greece
- Administrative region: East Macedonia and Thrace
- Regional unit: Xanthi
- Municipality: Abdera

Area
  - Municipal unit: 159.5 km^{2} (61.6 sq mi)

Population (2021)
  - Municipal unit: 9,730
  - Municipal unit density: 61.0/km^{2} (158/sq mi)
- Time zone: UTC+2 (EET)
  - Summer (DST): UTC+3 (EEST)
- Vehicle registration: AH

Vistonida (Greek: Βιστωνίδα) is a former municipality in the Xanthi regional unit, East Macedonia and Thrace, Greece. It was named after Lake Vistonida. Since the 2011 local government reform it is part of the municipality Abdera, of which it is a municipal unit. The municipal unit has an area of 159.524 km^{2}. Population 9,730 (2021). The seat of the municipality was the town Genisea.
