= Abdera, Thrace =

Municipality in the Xanthi Prefecture of Thrace, Greece

Abdera Άβδηρα
- Municipality
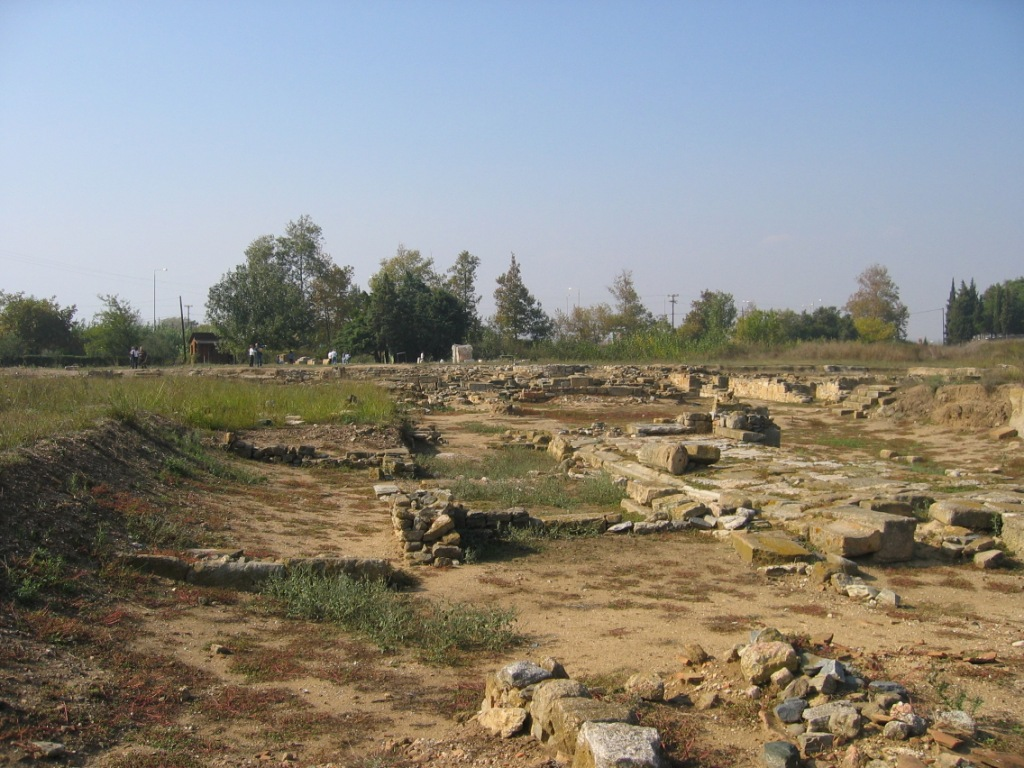
- Remains of the ancient city of Abdera.

- Location within Greece
- Coordinates: 40°56′N 24°58′E
- Country: Greece
- Geographic region: Thrace
- Administrative region: Eastern Macedonia and Thrace
- Regional unit: Xanthi

Government
  - Mayor: Georgios Tsitiridis (since 2014)

Area
  - Municipality: 352.0 km^{2} (135.9 sq mi)
  - Municipal unit: 162.0 km^{2} (62.5 sq mi)
- Elevation: 41 m (135 ft)

Population (2021)
  - Municipality: 17,610
  - Density: 50.03/km^{2} (129.6/sq mi)
  - Municipal unit: 2,799
  - Municipal unit density: 17.28/km^{2} (44.75/sq mi)
  - Community: 1,172
- Demonym(s): Abderite, Abderian
- Time zone: UTC+2 (EET)
  - Summer (DST): UTC+3 (EEST)
- Vehicle registration: AH

Abdera (Greek: Άβδηρα) is a municipality in the Xanthi regional unit of Thrace, Greece. In classical antiquity, it was a major Greek polis on the Thracian coast.

The ancient polis is to be distinguished from the municipality, which was named in its honor. The polis lay 17 km east-northeast of the mouth of the Nestos River, almost directly opposite the island of Thasos. It was a colony placed in previously unsettled Thracian territory, not then a part of Hellas, during the age of Greek colonization. The city that developed from it became of major importance in ancient Greece. After the 4th century AD it declined, contracted to its acropolis, and was abandoned, never to be reoccupied except by archaeologists.

During the Early Middle Ages, a new settlement emerged near the ancient city. It was called Polystylon (Greek: Πολύστυλον), and later considered as the New Abdera (Greek: Νέα Άβδηρα). In 2011 the modern municipality of Abdera was synoecized from three previous municipalities comprising a number of modern settlements. The ancient site remains in it as a ruin. The municipality of Abdera has 17,610 inhabitants (2021). The seat of the municipality is the town Genisea.

== Name ==
The name Abdera is of Phoenician origin and was shared in antiquity by Abdera, Spain and a town near Carthage in North Africa. (Note: The name of the African town is written Ἄβδειρα (Ábdeira) in Claudius Ptolemy's Geography.) It was variously Hellenized as Ἄβδηρα (Ábdēra), Αὔδηρα (Aúdēra), Ἄβδαρα (Ábdara), Ἄβδηρον (Ábdēron), and Ἄβδηρος (Ábdēros), before being Latinized as Abdera. Greek legend attributed the name to an eponymous Abderus who fell nearby and was memorialized by Hercules's founding of a city at the location.

The present-day town is written Avdira (Άβδηρα) and pronounced [ˈavðira] in modern Greek.

== History ==
=== Antiquity ===
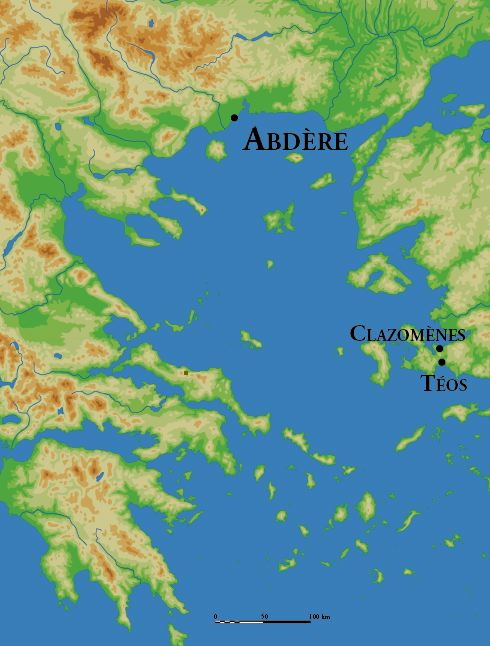
Location of Abdera and its two successive metropolises, Clazomenae and Teos.

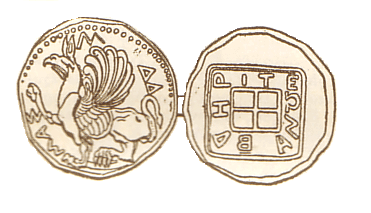
The chief coin type, with griffon.

The Phoenicians apparently began the settlement of Abdera at some point before the mid-7th century and the town long maintained Phoenician standards in its coinage.

Sapaeans (Ancient Greek, "Σαπαίοι") were a Thracian tribe close to the Greek city of Abdera.

The Greek settlement was begun as a failed colony from Klazomenai, traditionally dated to 654 BC. (Evidence in 7th-century-BC Greek pottery tends to support the traditional date but the exact timing remains uncertain.) Herodotus reports that the leader of the colony had been Timesios but, within his generation, the Thracians had expelled the colonists. Timesios was subsequently honored as a local protective spirit by the later Abderans from Teos. Others recount various legends about this colony. Plutarch and Aelian relate that Timesios grew insufferable to his colonists because of his desire to do everything by himself; when one of their children let him know how they all really felt, he quit the settlement in disgust; modern scholars have tried to split the difference between the two accounts of early Abdera's failure by giving the latter as the reason for Timesios's having left Klazomenai.

Strabo describes Abdera as "a Thracian city" at the time of Anacreon and the migration of people from Teos to that area. The successful colonisation occurred in 544 BC, when the majority of the people of Teos (including the poet Anacreon) migrated to Abdera to escape the Persian invasion of their homeland. The chief coin type, a griffon, is identical with that of Teos; the rich silver coinage is noted for the beauty and variety of its reverse types.

In 513 and 512 BC, the Persians, under Darius conquered Abdera, by which time the city seems to have become a place of considerable importance, and is mentioned as one of the cities which had the expensive honour of entertaining the great king on his march into Greece. In 492 BC, after the Ionian Revolt, the Persians again conquered Abdera, again under Darius I but led by his general Mardonius. On his flight after the Battle of Salamis, Xerxes stopped at Abdera and acknowledged the hospitality of its inhabitants by presenting them with a tiara and scimitar of gold. Thucydides mentions Abdera as the westernmost limit of the Odrysian kingdom when at its height at the beginning of the Peloponnesian War. It later became part of the Delian League and fought on the side of Athens in the Peloponnesian War.

Abdera was a wealthy city, the third richest in the League, due to its status as a prime port for trade with the interior of Thrace and the Odrysian kingdom. In 408 BC, Abdera was reduced under the power of Athens by Thrasybulus, then one of the Athenian generals in that quarter.

A valuable prize, the city was repeatedly sacked: by the Triballi in 376 BC, Philip II of Macedon in 350 BC; later by Lysimachos of Thrace, the Seleucids, the Ptolemies, and again by the Macedonians. In 170 BC the Roman armies and those of Eumenes II of Pergamon besieged and sacked it.

The town seems to have declined in importance after the middle of the 4th century BC. Cicero ridicules the city as a byword for stupidity in his letters to Atticus, writing of a debate in the Senate, "Here was Abdera, but I wasn't silent" ("Hic, Abdera non tacente me"). The Philogelos, a Greek-language joke book compiled in the 4th century AD, has a chapter dedicated to jokes about Abderans, who are stereotyped as stupid, superstitious, and literal-minded. Nevertheless, the city counted among its citizens the philosophers Democritus, Protagoras and Anaxarchus, historian and philosopher Hecataeus of Abdera, and the lyric poet Anacreon. Pliny the Elder speaks of Abdera as being in his time a free city.

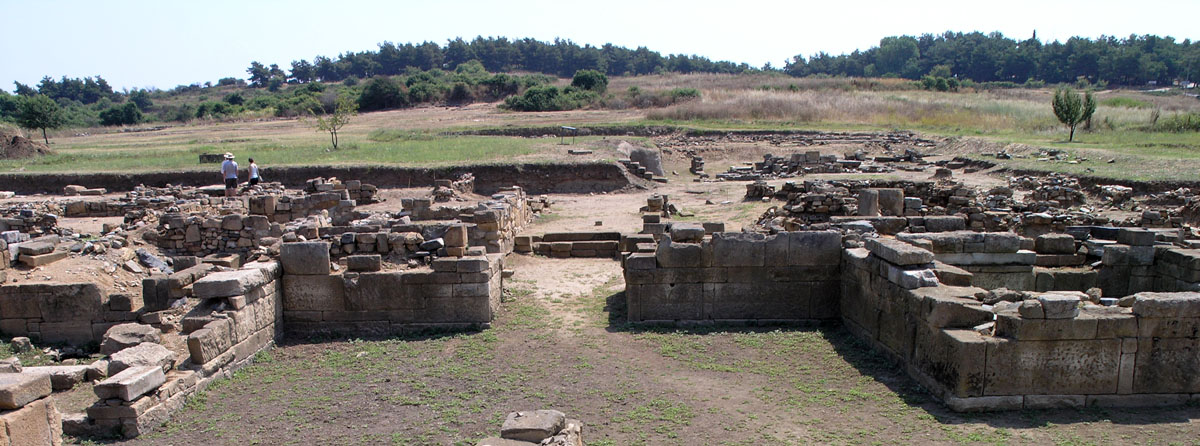
The west gate of classical Abdera

Abdera had flourished especially in ancient times mainly for two reasons: because of the large area of their territory and their highly strategic position. The city controlled two great road passages (one of Nestos river and other through the mountains north of Xanthi). Furthermore, from their ports passed the sea road, which from Troas led to the Thracian and then the Macedonian coast.

The ruins of the town may still be seen on Cape Balastra (40°56'1.02"N 24°58'21.81"E); they cover seven small hills, and extend from an eastern to a western harbor; on the southwestern hills are the remains of the medieval settlement of Polystylon (Greek: Πολύστυλον). Since the 9th century, Byzantine Polystylon was an episcopal see, under the jurisdiction of the metropolitan bishop of Philippi. By the end of the 14th century it fell under the Ottoman rule.

=== Modern ===
Avdira as a modern administrative unit (community) was established in 1924, and consisted of the villages Avdira, Myrodato (Kalfalar), Pezoula, Giona, Veloni and Mandra, but Myrodato and Mandra became separate communities in 1928. The municipality Avdira was formed in 1997 by the merger of the former communities Avdira, Mandra, Myrodato and Nea Kessani. At the 2011 local government reform it merged with the former municipalities Selero and Vistonida, and the town Genisea became its seat.

The municipality has an area of 352.047 km^{2}, the municipal unit 161.958 km^{2}. The municipal unit Avdira is subdivided into the communities Avdira, Mandra, Myrodato and Nea Kessani. The community Avdira consists of the settlements Avdira, Giona, Lefkippos, Pezoula and Skala.

== Landmarks ==
Landmarks of Abdera include the Archaeological Museum of Abdera, the Kütüklü Baba Tekke, and Agios Ioannis Beach (also Paralia Avdiron) near the village Lefkippos.

== Famous people ==
- Democritus
- Protagoras
- Hecateus
- Nicaenetus

== See also ==
- List of ancient Greek cities
