= Xanthi (regional unit) =

Xanthi Περιφερειακή ενότητα Ξάνθης
- Regional unit
- Municipalities of Xanthi

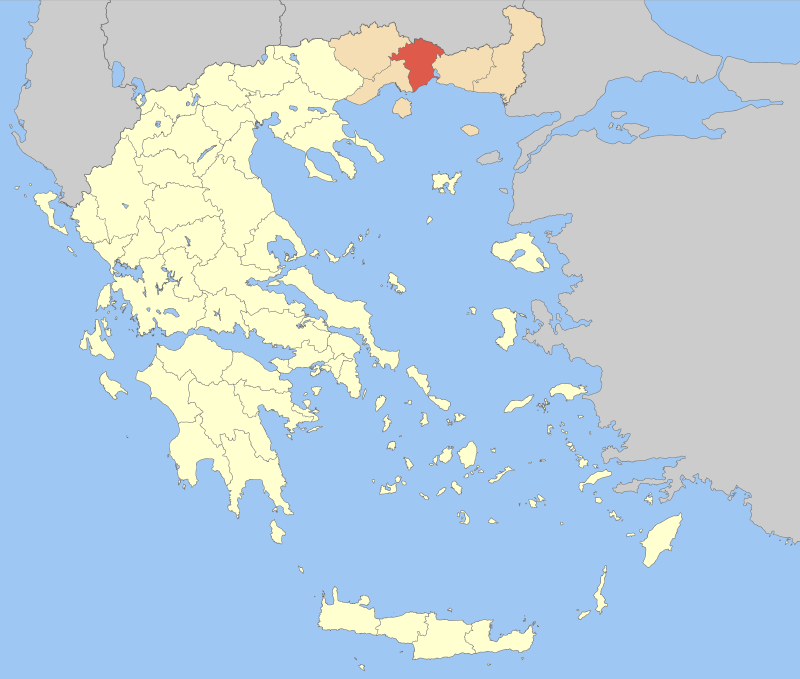
- Xanthi within Greece

- Location within Greece
- Coordinates: 41°10′N 24°55′E
- Country: Greece
- Administrative region: Eastern Macedonia and Thrace
- Seat: Xanthi

Area
  - Total: 1,793 km^{2} (692 sq mi)

Population (2021)
  - Total: 108,195
  - Density: 60.34/km^{2} (156.3/sq mi)
- Time zone: UTC+2 (EET)
  - Summer (DST): UTC+3 (EEST)
- Postal code: 67x xx
- Area code: 254x0, 25540
- Vehicle registration: ΑΗ
- Website: www.xanthi.gr

Xanthi (pronounced [ˈksanθi], Greek: Περιφερειακή ενότητα Ξάνθης) is one of the regional units of Greece. It is part of the Region of East Macedonia and Thrace. The capital is Xanthi. Together with the regional units Rhodope and Evros, it forms the geographical region of Western Thrace.

== Geography ==
Xanthi borders the Bulgarian provinces of Smolyan and Kardzhali to the north, and the Aegean Sea to the south. The regional unit of Kavala lies to the west, Drama to the northwest and Rhodope to the east. The Rhodope Mountains cover the northern part of the regional unit. The highest point is Koula, at 1,827m.

The coastal area has a predominantly Mediterranean climate, whereas the northern mountainous part has a colder continental climate.

== Administration ==
The regional unit Xanthi is subdivided into 4 municipalities. These are (number as in the map in the infobox):

- Abdera (Avdira, 2)
- Myki (3)
- Topeiros (4)
- Xanthi (1)

=== Prefecture ===
Xanthi was established as a prefecture in 1944 (Greek: Νομός Ξάνθης), when it was split off from the Rhodope Prefecture. As a part of the 2011 Kallikratis government reform, the prefecture was transformed into a regional unit within the East Macedonia and Thrace region, with no change in its boundaries. At the same time, the municipalities were reorganised, according to the table below.

New municipality	Old municipalities	Seat
Abdera (Avdira)	Abdera	Genisea
Abdera (Avdira)	Vistonida	Genisea
Abdera (Avdira)	Selero	Genisea
Myki	Myki	Sminthi
Myki	Thermes	Sminthi
Myki	Kotyli	Sminthi
Myki	Satres	Sminthi
Topeiros	Topeiros	Evlalo
Xanthi	Xanthi	Xanthi
Xanthi	Stavroupoli	Xanthi

== Transport ==
- EO2/E90, Via Egnatia, old and new, SW, Cen., S, SE
- EO12/E90, W, Cen.
- EO55
- Railway Thessaloniki-Alexandroupoli

== Culture ==
The remains of the ancient city of Abdera have been excavated. Subterranean Macedonian tombs from the 2nd century BC have been discovered in Komnina. There is a Byzantine castle near the old town of Xanthi. During the 19th century, local tobacco production and commerce developed rapidly. The manors of the old city Xanthi, many of which are still intact, testify to the prosperity of the tobacco merchants during this period.

== See also ==
- List of settlements in the Xanthi regional unit
- Slavic toponyms of places in Xanthi Prefecture
