= COVID-19 pandemic in Greece =

- Disease: COVID-19
- Pathogen: SARS-CoV-2
- Location: Greece
- First outbreak: Wuhan, Hubei, China
- Index case: Thessaloniki
- Arrival date: 26 February 2020 (6 years, 8 months and 3 days)
- Confirmed cases: 5,868,533
- Recovered: 6,064,290 reported
- Deaths: 40,254
- Fatality rate: 0.69%
- Vaccinations: 7,938,031 (total vaccinated); 7,647,076 (fully vaccinated); 22,467,978 (doses administered)

Government website
- covid19.gov.gr

The COVID-19 pandemic in Greece was a part of the worldwide pandemic of coronavirus disease 2019 (COVID-19) caused by severe acute respiratory syndrome coronavirus 2 (SARS-CoV-2). The first case in Greece was confirmed on 26 February 2020 when a 38-year-old woman from Thessaloniki who had recently visited Νorthern Italy, was confirmed to be infected. Subsequent cases in late February and early March related to people who had travelled to Italy and a group of pilgrims who had travelled to Israel and Egypt, as well as their contacts. The first death from COVID-19 in Greece was a 66-year-old man, who died on 12 March. Since the opening of the Greek borders to tourists at the end of June 2020, the daily number of confirmed cases announced has included those detected following tests at the country's entry points.

Following the confirmation of the first three cases in Greece, all carnival events in the country were cancelled on 27 February 2020. Health and state authorities issued precautionary guidelines and recommendations, while measures up to early March were taken locally and included the closure of schools and the suspension of cultural events in the affected areas (particularly Ilia, Achaea and Zakynthos). On 10 March, with 89 confirmed cases and no deaths in the country, the government decided to suspend the operation of educational institutions of all levels nationwide and then, on 13 March, to close down all cafes, sports leagues bars, museums, shopping centres, sports facilities and restaurants in the country. On 16 March, all retail shops were also closed and all services in all areas of religious worship of any religion or dogma were suspended. The government has announced a series of measures worth a total of around 24 billion euros, 14% of the country's GDP, to support the economy.

On 22 March, the Greek authorities announced restrictions on all non-essential movement throughout the country, starting from 6 a.m. on 23 March. From that date, movement outside the house was permitted only for seven categories of reasons: i) moving to or from one's workplace during work hours, ii) going to the pharmacy or visiting a doctor iii) going to a food store iv) going to the bank for services not possible online, v) assisting a person in need of help vi) going to a major ritual (funeral, marriage, baptism) or movement, for divorced parents, which is essential for contact with their children, and vii) moving outdoors for exercising or taking one's pet out, individually or in pairs. Citizens leaving their homes are required to carry their police ID or passport, as well as a signed attestation in which the purpose or category of travel is stated. The Hellenic Police, the Municipal Police, the Hellenic Coast Guard and the National Transparency Authority are empowered to enforce the restrictions and can issue fines for each offence. On 4 April, these restrictions were extended until 27 April, and on 23 April, they were again extended until 4 May.

The measures put in place in Greece were among the most proactive and strictest in Europe and have been credited internationally for having slowed the spread of the disease and having kept the number of deaths among the lowest in Europe.

Starting from 4 May 2020, after a 42-day lockdown, Greece began to gradually lift restrictions on movement and to restart business activity.

Greece put in place new measures and restrictions on movement and business activity from 7 November 2020. Kindergartens, primary schools and special schools initially remained open, unlike the first lockdown in March, while middle and high schools switched to distance learning. On 14 November 2020, primary schools and kindergartens closed, initially for two weeks, and from 18 November 2020, they switched to distance learning. On 20 November 2020, Greece overtook China in terms of the number of confirmed cases of COVID-19. The country reached 100,000 cases on 27 November.

On 14 December 2020, shops (utilizing the click away method) as well as hairdressers and other facilities were allowed to open, while schools and restaurants remained closed. Two weeks later, on 28 December, Greece overtook China in terms of the number of deaths from COVID-19. At the end of 2020, there were nearly 140,000 cases and about 4,800 deaths in the country. On 2 January 2021, starting from the next day, all the measures lifted or relaxed on 14 December were reinstated until 18 January, citing the opening of schools as reason for these measures. However, the government's planned reopening of all schools on 8 or 11 January was criticised by many epidemiologists in the country and, in the end, only primary schools reopened on 11 January, with secondary schools reopening on 1 February.

In late January 2021, case numbers increased. On 12 February 2021, Attica was again placed in lockdown with the closure of lower schools (high schools had already been closed since early November) and retail outlets, but virus cases continued their rapid growth reaching 3,215 on 9 March. Local lockdowns were imposed in more and more local districts. On 4 March, new measures were taken, including placing all of Greece in the highest level of measures. On 5 March, Greece reached 200,000 cases. Approximately half of the prefectures were in the deep red level (full closure of all schools and retail outlets), and on 12 March, all schools were closed for two weeks. The COVID-19 death toll in the country exceeded 10,000 on 25 April. On 3 May, the lockdown ended and measures eased, and on 14 May, Greece, including islands, opened for tourists from several countries. The country reached 300,000 cases on 13 April, 400,000 on 30 May, 500,000 on 3 August, 600,000 on 6 September, 700,000 on 19 October, 800,000 on 9 November, 900,000 on 24 November and a million on 12 December. By the end of 2021, there had been about 1.2 million cases and nearly 21,000 deaths in Greece.

== Background ==
On 12 January 2020, the World Health Organization (WHO) confirmed that a novel coronavirus was the cause of a respiratory illness in a cluster of people in Wuhan City, Hubei Province, China, which was reported to the WHO on 31 December 2019.

The case fatality ratio for COVID-19 has been much lower than SARS of 2003, but the transmission has been significantly greater, with a significant total death toll. On 28 July it was reported that the reproduction number R for Greece was stable at 0.4, but reportedly R rose to 1.0 in early August.

== Timeline ==
=== February 2020 ===
- On 26 February, the first case in Greece was confirmed. A 38-year-old woman from Thessaloniki, who had recently visited Milan, Northern Italy, tested positive and was admitted to AHEPA University Hospital. Her family, as well as those who came into contact with her, voluntarily isolated themselves.
- On 27 February, two new cases in Greece were confirmed. The woman's nine-year-old child tested positive and was admitted to the same hospital as her mother. Additionally, a 40-year-old woman who had travelled to Italy also tested positive and was admitted to Attikon University General Hospital. Following the confirmation of the second and third cases in Greece, it was announced that the 105th Primary School of Thessaloniki, where the first patient's daughter went to school, would close for fourteen days. The Minister of Health, Vasilis Kikilias, also announced that all carnival events would be cancelled throughout Greece.
- On 28 February, the fourth case in Greece was confirmed. A 36-year-old woman from Athens who had recently travelled to Italy tested positive and was admitted to the Attikon University General Hospital. Eight state schools were closed as a precautionary measure in Attica to prevent the spread of the virus, and all educational school trips abroad were cancelled.
- On 29 February, three new cases in Greece were confirmed. A friend of the 38-year-old woman who was the first case in Greece, was admitted to the AHEPA University Hospital. Additionally, two more people in Athens were admitted to the General Hospital Sotiria, bringing the country total to seven confirmed cases.

=== March 2020 ===
- On 4 March, two new cases were confirmed in Greece. A middle-aged man in close contact with the fifth confirmed case, tested positive and was put in solitary confinement at AHEPA University Hospital. Additionally, a man who had travelled to Israel and Egypt, was admitted to the General University Hospital of Patras, bringing the country total to nine confirmed cases.
- On 5 March, 22 new cases were confirmed in Greece. The 66-year-old wife, who was the ninth case in Greece, tested positive and was admitted to the same hospital as her husband. 21 of their fellow travellers also tested positive, bringing the country total to 31 cases.
- On 6 March, 14 new cases were confirmed in Greece. Eleven members of the Israel-Egypt travel group, as well as three people who afterwards came in contact with them, tested positive, bringing the country total to 45 confirmed cases. Schools, universities, theaters and cinemas were closed until 22 March in three of the affected areas (Achaea, Elis and Zakynthos).
- On 7 March, 21 new cases were confirmed in Greece. Thirteen people in Achaia and Ileia, seven in Attica and one in Euboea tested positive, bringing the country total to 66 confirmed cases.
- On 8 March, seven new cases were confirmed in Greece, bringing the country total to 73.
- On 9 March, eleven new cases were confirmed in Greece, bringing the country total to 84. Among those cases was the first one to be reported in Lesbos, raising fears that the virus could spread to the island's tightly packed refugee camps.
- On 10 March, five new cases were confirmed in Greece, bringing the country total to 89. Evangelos Marinakis, the owner of the football clubs Olympiacos in Greece and Nottingham Forest in England, informed the public via social media that he had contracted the virus, and urged all to follow the orders of health professionals. Health Minister Vasilis Kikilias announced the closure of all educational institutions for 14 days.
- On 11 March, ten new cases were confirmed in Greece, bringing the country total to 99. The 66-year-old man hospitalised in Rio was diagnosed with multiple organ dysfunction syndrome.
- On 12 March, 18 new cases were confirmed in Greece, bringing the country total to 117. The first two reported cases in Greece, a mother and her child, were released from the hospital, having fully recovered. The 66-year-old patient in Rio died as a result of the virus, which was the first virus-related death in Greece.
- On 13 March, 73 new cases were confirmed in Greece, bringing the country total to 190. Katerina Sakellaropoulou was sworn in as President of Greece in the Hellenic Parliament and became the first woman to hold the office, succeeding Prokopis Pavlopoulos. Sakellaropoulou suspended the protocol ceremony for the inauguration scheduled for Saturday 14 and no handshakes were allowed.
- On 14 March, 38 new cases were confirmed in Greece, bringing the country total to 228, while six more were released from hospitals, bringing the recovered total to eight. A 90-year-old man hospitalised in Ptolemaida died. Also, a 67-year-old man hospitalised in Zakynthos died, bringing the country death toll to three. A change in strategy to only testing the elderly, severely ill and other high-risk groups, as well as healthcare personnel was announced by Dr. Sotiris Tsiodras, the health ministry spokesman on the COVID-19 pandemic. (Note: Le Figaro claimed that Tsiodras was the "new beloved of Greeks". In the article Le Figaro claims that he asked Prime Minister Kyriakos Mitsotakis for strict lockdown measures as soon as the first cases were reported in Italy. Greek sociologist Andreas Drymiotis wrote: "Greeks particularly appreciate his calm, his knowledge on the matter, and his deep respect for all victims and the fact that he has an unbreakable dedication to nursing staff.".)
- On 15 March, 103 new cases were confirmed in Greece, bringing the country total to 331, while two more were released from hospitals, bringing the recovered total to ten. A 53-year-old man died from the virus, in AHEPA, bringing the country death toll to four.
- On 16 March, 21 new cases were confirmed in Greece, bringing the country total to 352.
- On 17 March, 35 new cases were confirmed in Greece, bringing the country total to 387, while four were released from hospitals, bringing the recovered total to 14. A man died bringing the country death toll to five.
- On 18 March, 31 new cases were confirmed in Greece, bringing the country total to 418. A total of 6,000 samples had been tested nationally up to this point. A childbirth was recorded, where the mother tested positive for COVID-19 but the child did not.
- On 19 March, 46 new cases were confirmed in Greece, bringing the country total to 464, while five more were released from hospitals, bringing the recovered total to 19. A 70-year-old man who had been hospitalised in Kastoria, died, bringing the country death toll to six.
- On 20 March, 31 new cases were confirmed in Greece, bringing the country total to 495. Four more people died, bringing the country death toll to ten.
- On 21 March, 35 new cases were confirmed in Greece, bringing the country total to 530. Three more people died, bringing the country death toll to 13.
- On 22 March, 94 new cases were confirmed in Greece, bringing the country total to 624. Two more people died, bringing the country death toll to 15.
- On 23 March, 71 new cases were confirmed in Greece, bringing the country total to 695, while ten people were released from hospitals, bringing the recovered total to 29. A 64-year-old man at Rio Hospital in Achaea and an elderly man at Sotiria Hospital in Athens died as a result of the virus, bringing the country death toll to 17. During the night, another childbirth was recorded where the mother tested positive for COVID-19.
- On 24 March, 48 new cases were confirmed in Greece, bringing the country total to 743, while three people were released from hospitals, bringing the recovered total to 32. Three more people died due to the virus, bringing the country death toll to 20. A 40-year-old woman, who had died three days previously, was found to have been positive for the virus making her, by far, the youngest victim of the pandemic in Greece. The new President of Greece, Katerina Sakellaropoulou, declared she was going to address the nation on the evening of the 24th regarding both the COVID-19 pandemic and the 25th of March Independence Day celebrations.
- On 25 March, 78 new cases were confirmed in Greece, bringing the country total to 821, while four people were released from hospitals, bringing the recovered total to 36. Two more deaths from coronavirus were reported, bringing the country death toll to 22.
- On 26 March, 71 new cases were confirmed in Greece, bringing the country total to 892, while six people were released from hospitals, bringing the recovered total to 42. Four more deaths from coronavirus were reported, bringing the country death toll to 26.
- On 27 March, 74 new cases were confirmed in Greece, bringing the country total to 966, while ten people were released from hospitals, bringing the recovered total to 52. Two more deaths from coronavirus were reported, bringing the country death toll to 28.
- On 28 March, 95 new cases were confirmed in Greece, bringing the country total to 1,061. Four more deaths from coronavirus were reported, bringing the country death toll to 32.
- On 29 March, 95 new cases were confirmed in Greece, bringing the county total to 1,156, while one person was released from Alexandroupoli University hospital, bringing the recovered total to 53. Six more deaths from coronavirus were reported, bringing the country death toll to 38. The first case of coronavirus was reported of a monk in Mount Athos.
- On 30 March, 56 new cases were confirmed in Greece, bringing the county total to 1,212. Five more deaths from coronavirus were reported, bringing the country death toll to 43.
- On 31 March, 102 new cases were confirmed in Greece, bringing the country total to 1,314. Six more deaths from coronavirus were reported, bringing the country death toll to 49. 20 of the cases are aboard a passenger ship stationed outside the port of Piraeus. It carried 382 people, including 36 Greeks, 150 Turks, 83 Indonesians and others. Some of the people were Turkish workers traveling to Spain but the ship was turned back to Turkey when the cases were identified. It was not accepted in Turkey and since 21 March has been outside Piraeus.

=== April 2020 ===
- On 1 April, 101 new cases were confirmed in Greece, bringing the country total to 1,415. One more death from coronavirus was reported, bringing the country death toll to 50.
- On 2 April, 129 new cases were confirmed in Greece, the highest number in a single day up to that date, bringing the country total to 1,544. Twenty-seven new cases were reported in the general population, 23 in the Ritsona refugee and immigrant camp, and 79 new cases on the ship El. Venizelos which is being kept off the port of Piraeus, bringing the total cases on the ship to 119. Three more deaths from coronavirus were reported, bringing the country death toll to 53.
- On 3 April, it was announced that the total number of confirmed cases in the country was 1,613. Six more deaths from coronavirus were reported, bringing the country death toll to 59.
- On 4 April, 60 new cases were confirmed in Greece, bringing the country total to 1,673. Nine more deaths from coronavirus were reported, bringing the country death toll to 68. Ninety-two coronavirus patients were being treated in intensive care units.
- On 5 April, 62 new cases were confirmed in Greece, bringing the country total to 1,735. Five more deaths from coronavirus were reported, bringing the country death toll to 73. Ninety-three coronavirus patients were being treated in intensive care units.
- On 6 April, 20 new cases were confirmed in Greece, bringing the country total to 1,755. Six more deaths from coronavirus were reported, bringing the country death toll to 79.
- On 7 April, 77 new cases were confirmed in Greece, bringing the country total to 1,832. Two more deaths from coronavirus were reported, bringing the country death toll to 81.
- On 8 April, 52 new cases were confirmed in Greece, bringing the country total to 1,884. Two more deaths from coronavirus were reported, bringing the country death toll to 83. The number of coronavirus patients in ICUs was 84.
- On 9 April, 71 new cases were confirmed in Greece, bringing the country total to 1,955. Three more deaths from coronavirus were reported, bringing the country death toll to 86. The number of coronavirus patients in ICUs was 79.
- On 10 April, 56 new cases were confirmed in Greece, bringing the country total to 2,011. Four more deaths from coronavirus were reported, bringing the country death toll to 90. One of the people who died was from Mesopotamia, Kastoria an area that was in quarantine. The number of coronavirus patients in ICUs was 77.
- On 11 April, 72 new cases were confirmed in Greece, bringing the official country total to 2,081 (minor discrepancy). Three more deaths from coronavirus were reported, bringing the country death toll to 93. The number of coronavirus patients in ICUs was 75.
- On 12 April, 33 new cases were confirmed in Greece, bringing the country total to 2,114. Five more deaths from coronavirus were reported, bringing the country death toll to 98. The number of coronavirus patients in ICUs was 76.
- On 13 April, 31 new cases were confirmed in Greece, bringing the country total to 2,145. One more death from coronavirus was reported, bringing the country death toll to 99. The number of coronavirus patients in ICUs was 73. Later the same day an 84-year-old man died in Attica marking the 100th death from COVID-19 in the country.
- On 14 April, 25 new cases were confirmed in Greece, bringing the country total to 2,170. Two more deaths from coronavirus were reported, bringing the country death toll to 101. The number of coronavirus patients in ICUs was 76.
- On 15 April, 22 new cases were confirmed in Greece, bringing the country total to 2,192. During the daily report, 1 more death from coronavirus was reported, bringing the country death toll to 102. Shortly after a 57-year-old woman was reported as having died in AHEPA University Hospital.
- On 16 April, 15 new cases were confirmed in Greece, bringing the country total to 2,207. The death toll brought to 105.
- On 17 April, 17 new cases were confirmed in Greece, bringing the country total to 2,224. A 76-old-man died in Ptolemaida and two others later. The deaths toll brought to 108.
- On 18 April, 11 new cases were confirmed in Greece, bringing the country total to 2,235.
- On 20 April, 10 new cases and 6 new deaths were announced, bringing the country total to 2,245 cases and 116 deaths, respectively. On the same day, all 470 refugees accommodated in a facility in Kranidi, Argolis were tested for the virus as well as all staff of the facility, the local clinic and the International Organization for Migration (IOM), a total of 497 samples. Among them a 68-year-old woman in Kastoria. Some hours after the daily report, an 87-year-old man died in AHEPA University Hospital.
- On 21 April, 156 new cases were confirmed in Greece, the highest number in a single day up to that date, bringing the total to 2,401. Of those 156, 150 cases, all asymptomatic, were related to the refugee facility in Kranidi. Out of a total of 497 samples taken the day before, 148 had been found to be positive among the refugees and 2 among the facility's staff and members of the IOM. The same day, five more deaths from coronavirus were reported, bringing the country's death toll to 121. The number of coronavirus patients in ICUs was 59. A 35-year-old man in Thessaloniki, a 75-year-old man in Athens, and a 101-year-old woman were among the dead.
- On 22 April, no deaths were reported. Seven new cases were confirmed.
- On 23 April, 55 new cases and 4 new deaths were reported at the daily report. The deaths were an 88-year-old man, a 76-old man who was being treated by the Red Cross, a 90-year-old man in AHEPA University Hospital and a 63-year-old man in Thriasio. After the daily report, two more people died: an 87-year-old in NIMITS Hospital and a 74-year-old woman in Alexandroupoli.
- On 24 April, a 59-year-old woman died in AHEPA University Hospital and an 81-year-old woman in Komotini. Twenty-seven new cases and 5 new deaths were reported at the daily report.
- On 25 April, no new deaths were reported. Sixteen new cases were confirmed. Three hours after the daily report, the death of a 78-year-old man at Evangelismos Hospital was reported.
- On 26 April, 4 new deaths and 11 new cases were confirmed within the previous 24 hours. The deaths included a 91-year-old man at "Sotiria" Hospital in Athens, and a 58-year-old woman in Alexandroupoli.
- On 27 April, 2 new deaths and 17 new cases were confirmed within the previous 24 hours. The two deaths were an 80-year-old woman at Papanikolaou Hospital and a 59-year-old man in Alexandroupoli.
- On 28 April, a 90-year-old man in Rio died and an 84-year-old man at Taxiarchai.
- On 29 April, 10 news cases were confirmed within the previous 24 hours. An 89-year-old man at NIMTS Hospital died.
- On 30 April, one new death and 15 new cases were confirmed. The confirmed total number of recoveries was announced to be 1,374.

=== May 2020 ===
- On 1 May, no new deaths and 21 new cases were confirmed.
- On 2 May, 3 more deaths occurred: A 57-year-old man at Sotiria Hospital, and one 88-year-old man and one 83-year-old man, both at NIMTS. Greece's cases total reached 2,612 and its death toll 143.
- On 3 May, a 76-year-old woman died at NIMTS. Greece's cases total reached 2,620 and its death toll 144.
- On 4 May, an 88-year-old woman died at Attikon University General Hospital, and a 50-year-old died in Larissa. The confirmed cases of coronavirus in Greece totalled 2,632, and the death toll reached 146 as two people had died in the previous 24 hours.
- On 5 May, no new deaths and 10 new cases were confirmed.
- On 6 May, an 89-year-old woman died at Sotiria Hospital.
- On 7 May, 1 new death and 15 new cases were confirmed. Shortly after, a 67-year-old man in Larissa died.
- On 8 May, Dr. Dimitris Kremastinos died at the age of 79. The death toll rose to 150 and 15 new cases were confirmed.
- On 9 May, one new death and 19 new cases were confirmed.
- On 10 and 11 May, there were no new deaths.
- On 12 May, 1 new death was announced.
- On 13 May, 3 new deaths were announced.
- On 14 May, 1 new death was announced.
- On 15 May, 4 new deaths were announced and 40 new cases were confirmed, 35 of which were from among 637 samples taken the day before from residents of a Roma settlement in Larissa, after several cases had been recorded there in the previous days. Positive cases were quarantined and transferred to a medical centre and their contacts were traced, after clashes occurred with residents disputing the test results and opposing the patients' transfer. A local night curfew was also imposed for 14 days. The use of face masks for everyone in the area became mandatory and masks and antiseptics were distributed to each family.
- On 16 May, 2 new cases were reported, the lowest since 4 March. A 92-year-old and an 84-year-old woman died in NIMITS.
- On 21 May, one death and 3 new cases were announced, the total confirmed cases during the pandemic reached 2,853 and there had been 168 total deaths
- On 22 May, a 79-year-old man died at AHEPA.
- On 23 May, a 91-year-old woman at Agia Varvara General Hospital in Attica and an 89-year-old man at Attikon died.

=== June 2020 ===
- On 1 June, 4 new deaths were announced, a 66-year-old woman died at Sotiria Thoracic Diseases Hospital in Athens and an 87-year-old man also died at NIMTS.
- On 2 June, no new deaths were announced. Nineteen new cases were reported, of whom 12 had travelled on a flight from Doha. As a result, all flights to and from Qatar were suspended until 15 June.
- On 6 June, a 72-year-old man died at Sotiria Thoracic Diseases Hospital in Athens bringing the country's total to 181.
- On 7 June, a 59-year-old woman from Satres died at the University Hospital of Alexandroupoli bringing the country's total to 182.
- On 15 June, the death of an 82-year-old man at the Hospital of Alexandroupoli was announced, bringing the country's total to 184.
- On 16 June, the deaths of a 67-year-old and a 74-year-old man as well as an 82-year-old woman, all from Echinos, Myki municipality in the Xanthi regional unit, were announced. Of the 15 cases confirmed on 16 June, 11 of them were residents of Echinos. Around 40% of the total number of cases confirmed in the country from 8 to 16 June related to the wider area of Xanthi. As a result, new emergency measures were imposed in the municipalities of Myki and Iasmos in Thraki.
- On 17 June, a total of 55 new cases were reported of which 43 were in the Xanthi regional unit (38 in Myki municipality, of which 36 in the village of Echinos, and 5 in Xanthi municipality). Another 6 cases were reported in the Rhodope regional unit. In total, 49 out of the 55 new cases were reported in Thrace, while a foreign traveller also tested positive for the virus.
- On 18 June, a total of 24 new cases were confirmed in the country. Of those, 18 were reported in the Xanthi regional unit, 2 in the Rhodope regional unit and there were 4 people arriving from abroad who were confirmed positive. The death of a 64-year-old woman from Echinos with underlying medical conditions was also announced on 18 June. From 15 to 18 June, a total of six COVID-19 deaths occurred in the country, all residents of Echinos.
- On 19 June, a total of 10 new cases were reported, of which 4 were in Rhodope regional unit, 2 in Xanthi regional unit and 4 were people who had arrived in Greece from abroad.
- On 20 June, one death and 19 new cases were announced. Of those, 8 were found in Xanthi regional unit, 1 in Athens and 1 in Pella regional unit, and there were also 9 cases confirmed among travellers who had arrived to Greece on flights from abroad or by car through the Promachonas border crossing with Bulgaria.
- On 21 June, a total of 10 new cases were confirmed nationally, of which 3 were in Rhodope, 2 in Thesprotia, 1 in Xanthi and 4 were detected among travellers arriving in Greece by air or by car from the Promachonas border crossing.
- On 22 June, 21 new cases were reported. Of those, 9 were found in Xanthi, 5 among travellers from abroad, another 5 in Thesprotia, 1 in Athens and 1 in Edessa, Pella.
- On 23 June, a total of 16 new cases were confirmed, of which 5 in Myki municipality of Xanthi regional unit, 3 in Xanthi municipality, 2 in Athens and another 2 in Paramythia, Thesprotia, 1 in Rhodope and another 1 in Edessa. There were also 2 infected travellers detected at the Promachonas Greek-Bulgarian border crossing.
- On 24 June, 8 new cases were reported, of which 3 were detected in Rhodope, 1 in Alexandroupoli, Evros, 1 in Messenia, 1 in Attica, and 2 cases were detected in arrivals by car through the Promachonas border crossing with Bulgaria.
- On 25 June, a 64-year-old woman died at the Hospital of Komotini, and 13 new cases were announced. Of those, 3 were detected in Xanthi, 1 in Paramythia, 1 in the island of Syros, 1 in Kastoria, 1 in Pella, 1 in Rhodope and there were also 5 cases confirmed among travellers who arrived in Greece on flights from abroad or by car through the Greek–Bulgarian border crossing at Promachonas.
- On 26 June, 22 new cases were confirmed, of which 10 were found among travellers who arrived in Greece on flights from abroad or by car through the Promachonas border crossing with Bulgaria, while 4 were found in Kastoria, 3 in Paramythia, 2 in Attica and 1 in Alexandroupoli and Komotini.
- On 27 June, 23 new cases were reported, of which 8 were detected among passengers on flights from abroad, 6 in Kastoria, 3 in Syros, another 3 in a refugee camp in Lesvos, 2 in Paramythia and 1 in Athens.
- On 29 June, 15 new cases were announced, of which 12 were detected in Xanthi Regional Unit and the rest were confirmed among travellers who had arrived on flights from abroad.
- On 30 June, a total of 20 new cases were confirmed, of which 9 were found among passengers on flights from abroad, 4 were found in Xanthi Regional Unit, 2 in Attica and another 2 in Kastoria, and 1 in Kozani, Syros and Larissa.

=== July 2020 ===
- As of 1 July, out of the total of 3,432 confirmed cases, 777 (22.6%) were related to travel abroad, 1906 (55.5%) were related to a known case, and the rest were still of undetermined origin. Overall, as of that date, the average age of the cases was 47 years and the average age of the deaths was 76 years (a range of 35–102 years old).
- On 14 July, there were 58 new confirmed cases, raising the total number of cases to 3,883. Of the 58 new cases, 8 were reported in Attica, 7 in Thessaloniki, 3 in Lesvos, 2 in Xanthi, 1 each in Imathia, Kozani, Arta, and Halkidiki, while 34 persons tested positive on arrival. The total death toll stood at 193; 62 women and 131 men.
- On 15 July, there were 27 new confirmed cases, bringing the total number of cases to 3,910. Of the 27 new cases, 8 were reported in Attica, 5 in Thessaloniki, 2 in Grevena, 1 each in Xanthi, Kastoria and Paros, while 9 persons tested positive on arrival. The death toll remained unchanged.
- On 16 July, there were 35 new confirmed cases, bringing the total number of cases to 3,939. Of the 35 new cases, 10 were reported in Attica, 3 in Thessaloniki, 1 each in Drama, Kozani, Larissa and Halkidiki, while 18 persons tested positive on arrival. The death toll remained unchanged.
- On 17 July, there were 28 new confirmed cases, bringing the total number of cases to 3,964. Of the 28 new cases, 3 were reported in Attica, 2 each in Thessaloniki, Xanthi, Magnesia and Larissa, one each in Heraklion and Halkidiki, while 12 persons tested positive on arrival. The death toll rose to 194.
- On 18 July, there were 19 new confirmed cases, of which 9 in Attica, 2 in Thessaloniki and 1 each in Kozani, Cycladic Islands, Larissa, Xanthi, and Halkidiki. The death toll remained unchanged.
- On 19 July, there were 24 new confirmed cases, bringing the total number to 4,007. Of the 24 new cases, 2 each were reported in Attica and Thessaloniki, 1 each in Magnesia and Halkidiki, while 18 persons tested positive on arrival. The death toll remained unchanged.
- On 20 July, there were 5 new confirmed cases, bringing the total number to 4,012. The death toll rose to 195.
- On 21 July, there were 36 new confirmed cases, bringing the total number to 4,048. Of the 36 new cases, 17 were reported in Attica, 4 in Thessaloniki, 2 each in Xanthi and Larissa, 1 each in Viotia, Aitoloakarnanias, Heraklion, Corinthia, Pellas, and Samos, while 5 persons tested positive on arrival. The death toll rose to 197.
- On 24 July, there were 26 new confirmed cases, bringing the total number to 4,135. Of the 26 new cases, 8 were reported in Attica, 5 in Thessaloniki, 1 each in Magnesia, Halkidiki and Kavala, while 10 persons tested positive on arrival. The death toll stood at 201.
- On 25 July, there were 31 new confirmed cases, bringing the total number to 4,166. Of the 31 new cases, 9 were reported in Attica, 4 in Thessaloniki, 2 each in Xanthi and Samos, 1 each in Imathia, Rethymnon and Heraklion, while 11 persons tested positive on arrival. The death toll remained unchanged.
- On 26 July, there were 27 new confirmed cases, bringing the total number of cases to 4,193. Of the 27 new cases, 7 were reported in Attica, 3 in Achaia, 2 each in Viotia and Zakynthos, 1 each in Thessaloniki, Kavala, Kozani, Lefkada and Pieria, while 8 persons tested positive on arrival. The death toll rose to 202.
- From 23 June to 24 July, there were 43 confirmed cases in the Ionian islands: 19 in Corfu, 14 in Lefkada, 9 in Zakynthos, one in Kefalonia.
- On 29 July, there were 57 new confirmed cases, bringing the total number of cases to 4,336. Of the 57 new cases, 18 were reported in Attica, 11 in Thessaloniki, 7 in Kavala, 2 in Lefkada, 1 each in Achaia, Imathia, Kilkis, Corinth, Dodecanese and Rhodope, while 13 persons tested positive on arrival. The death toll stood at 203.
- On 30 July, there were 65 new confirmed cases, bringing the total number of cases to 4,401. There were 11 new cases in Attica, 7 in Thessaloniki, 3 each in Kavala and Corfu, 2 each in Achaia and Xanthi, 1 each in Magnesia, Viotia and Kozani, while 34 persons tested positive on arrival. The death toll remained unchanged.
- On 31 July, there were 78 new confirmed cases, bringing the total number of cases to 4,477. The death toll rose to 206.

=== August 2020 ===
- On 1 August, there were 110 new confirmed cases, bringing the total number of cases to 4,587. Of the 110 new cases, 37 were reported in Thessaloniki, 23 in Kavala, 19 in Attica, 6 in Magnesia, 3 each in Corfu and Halkidiki, 2 in Pieria, 1 each in Corinth, Pellas, Larissa, Achaia and Viotia, while 12 persons tested positive on arrival. The death toll remained unchanged.
- On 2 August, there were 75 new confirmed cases, bringing the total number of cases to 4,662. Of the 75 new cases, 19 were reported in Attica, 15 in Thessaloniki, 13 in Kavala, 4 in Halkidiki, 2 in Fthiotis, 1 each in Arcadia, Imathia, Ioannina, Kastoria, Corfu, Kozani, Corinth, Pieria, Chania, Heraklion and Xanthi, while 9 persons tested positive on arrival. The death toll rose to 208.
- On 3 August, there were 77 new confirmed cases, bringing the total number of cases to 4,737. Of the 77 new cases, 28 were reported in Attica, 9 in Evros, 7 in Thessaloniki, 4 in Kavala, 3 in Corinth, 2 each in Evia, Cyclades and Chania, 1 each in Evrytania, Heraklion, Lesvos, Magnesia and Pellas, while 10 persons tested positive on arrival. The death toll rose to 209.
- On 4 August, there were 121 new confirmed cases, bringing the total number of cases to 4,858. Of the 121 new cases, 26 were recorded in Attica, 47 in Thessaloniki, 8 each in Halkidiki and Larissa, 2 each in Imathia and Serres, 1 each in Kavala, Arcadia, Achaia, Drama, Evros, Evia, Kozani, Pella and Chios, while 12 persons tested positive on arrival. The death toll remained unchanged.
- On 5 August, there were 124 new confirmed cases, bringing the total number of cases to 4,973. Of the 124 new cases, 22 each were reported in Attica and Thessaloniki, 18 in Evros, 8 each in Kavala and Larissa, 6 in Magnesia, 2 each in Rhodes, Imathia, Kozani and Halkidiki, 1 each in Corfu, Arcadia, Drama, Pieria, Kastoria, Cyclades, Pella and Chania, while 24 persons tested positive on arrival. The death toll rose to 210.
- On 6 August, there were 153 new confirmed cases, bringing the total number of cases to 5,123. Of the 153 new cases, 40 were recorded in Attica, 38 in Thessaloniki, 9 in Cyclades, 4 in Evros, 3 each in Corfu, Ilias, Corinth, Pellas and Halkidiki, 2 each in Achaia, Argolida, Ioannina, Kavala and Magnesia, 1 each in Thesprotia, Kilkis, Kozani, Messinia and Chania, while 18 persons tested positive on arrival. The death toll remained unchanged.
- On 7 August, there were 151 new confirmed cases, bringing the total number of cases to 5,270. Of the 151 new cases, 46 were recorded in Attica, 38 in Thessaloniki, 17 in Evros, 6 in Larissa, 4 in Pellas, 3 each in Magnesia and Corfu, 2 each in Aitoloakarnanias, Achaia, Heraklion, Kefalonia, Rodopia and Florina, 1 each in Corinth, Drama, Imathia, Kozani, Lesvos, Pieria, Serres, Trikala, Fthiotis and Chania, while 12 persons tested positive on arrival. The death toll remained unchanged.
- On 8 August, 152 new cases were confirmed, of which 22 were travellers who had arrived from abroad. The total number of confirmed cases reached 5,421, 54.7% of whom were men. One new death due to the COVID-19 was announced bringing the total number of deaths to 211. The average age of people who had died was 76 years old.
- On 9 August, 203 new cases were confirmed, the highest number in a single day up to that date, bringing the total number of cases to 5,623. In addition, one new death was announced, bringing the total number of deaths to 212.
- On 10 August, there were 126 confirmed new cases, bringing the total number of cases to 5,749. Of the 126 new cases, 38 were reported in Attica, 18 in Thessaloniki, 5 in Larissa, 3 each in Heraklion, Kastoria, Magnesia, Pella and Halkidiki, 2 each in Corfu, Dodecanese, Corinth and Trikala, 1 each in Viotia, Evros, Ilias, Kavala, Preveza and Serres, while 10 persons tested positive on arrival. The death toll rose to 213.
- On 11 August, there were 196 confirmed new cases, bringing the total number of cases to 5,942. Of the 196 new cases, 82 were reported in Attica, 42 in Thessaloniki, 7 in Larissa, 5 in Halkidiki, 4 each in Argolida and Florida, 2 each in Evros, Evia, Karditsa, Imathia, Kavala, Kefalonia, Cyclades, Pellas and Pieria, 1 each in Corfu, Viotia, Ioannina, Krikis, Corinth, Xanthi, Trikala and Aitoloakarnania, while 26 persons tested positive on arrival. The death toll rose to 214.
- On 12 August, there were 262 new cases, the highest number in a single day up to that date, bringing the total number of confirmed cases to 6,177. The death toll rose to 216.
- On 13 August, Greece recorded its first case in one of its overcrowded asylum seeker camps: a 35-year-old man from Yemen living at the camp of Vial on the island of Chios. Two hundred and four new cases were confirmed, bringing the total number of cases to 6,381. In addition, five new deaths were announced bringing the total number of deaths to 221: an 88-year-old woman, a 70-year-old man, and an 82-year-old died at the AHEPA University Hospital of Thessaloniki; a 91-year-old woman died at the Papanikolaou General Hospital of Thessaloniki; an 87-year-old man died at the General Hospital of Halkidiki.
- On 14 August, there were 254 new confirmed cases, bringing the total number of cases to 6,632. Of the 254 new cases, 98 were recorded in Attica, 76 in Thessaloniki, 9 in Evros, 6 each in Larissa and Halkidiki, 5 in Ilias, 4 each in Argolida, Achaia and Pellas, 3 each in Imathia, Cyclades and Pieria, 2 each in Aitoloakarnania, Heraklion, Kilkis and Lesvos, 1 each in Viotia, Grevena, Ioannina, Kavala, Kefalonia, Lefkada, Messinia, Serres, Fthiotis and Chios, while 22 persons tested positive on arrival. The death toll rose to 223.
- On 15 August, there were 230 new confirmed cases, bringing the total number of cases to 6,858. The death toll rose to 226.
- On 16 August, 217 new cases were confirmed bringing the total number of cases to 7,075 and two new deaths were announced, bringing the total number of deaths to 228: a 71-year-old man died at the AHEPA University Hospital of Thessaloniki and an 87-year-old woman died at the Bodosakeio General Hospital of Ptolemaida.
- On 17 August, there were 150 new cases, bringing the total number of cases to 7,222. The death toll rose to 230.
- A new daily high was recorded on 18 August, with 269 confirmed cases. The total number of cases reached 7,472. The death toll rose by 2 to 232.
- On 19 August, there were 217 new cases, bringing the total number of cases to 7,684. The death toll rose by 5 to 235.
- On 20 August, 269 new cases were confirmed, the total number of cases was brought to 7934. No new deaths were announced.
- On 21 August, 209 new cases were confirmed, the total number of cases was brought to 8,138. Three new deaths were announced, bringing the total number of fatalities to 238.
- On 22 August, 264 new cases were confirmed, the total number of cases was brought to 8,381. Two new deaths were announced, bringing the total number of fatalities to 240.
- Οn 23 August, 284 new confirmed cases, a new record, were recorded. The total number of cases to date was 8,664. Two new deaths were announced, bringing the total number of fatalities to 242.
- On 24 August, 170 new cases were confirmed, the total number of cases was brought to 8,819. No new deaths were announced.
- On 25 August, there were 168 new cases, bringing the total number of cases to 8,987. The death toll rose by 1 to 243.
- A new daily high was recorded on 26 August, with 293 new cases. The total number of cases reached 9,280. The death toll rose by 5 to 248.
- On 27 August, there were 259 new cases, bringing the total number of cases to 9,531. The death toll rose by 6 to 254.
- On 28 August, there were 270 new cases, bringing the total number of cases to 9,800. The death toll rose by 5 to 259.
- On 29 August, there were 177 new cases, bringing the total number of cases to 9,977. The death toll rose by 1 to 260.
- On 30 August, there were 157 new cases, bringing the total number of cases to 10,134. The death toll grew by 2 to 262.
- On 31 August, there were 183 new cases, bringing the total number of cases to 10,317. The death toll rose by 4 to 266.

=== September 2020 ===
- On 15 September, the total number of confirmed cases rose to 13,730 and the death toll to 313.
- On 30 September, the total number of confirmed cases rose to 18,475 and the death toll to 391.

=== October 2020 ===
- On 15 October, the total number of confirmed cases rose to 23,947 and the death toll to 482.
- On 27 October, the total number of confirmed cases rose to 34,299 and the death toll to 603.

=== November 2020 ===
- On 15 November, the total number of confirmed cases rose to 74,205 and the death toll to 1,106.
- On 20 November, the number of confirmed cases rose to 87,812, exceeding the number of confirmed cases in China, and the death toll to 1,419.
- On 27 November, the number of confirmed cases rose to 101,287, crossing the 100,000-mark, and the death toll to 2,102.
- On 30 November, the total number of confirmed cases rose to 105,271 and the death toll to 2,406.

=== December 2020 ===
- On 15 December, the total number of confirmed cases rose to 126,372 and the death toll to 3,785.
- On 28 December, the total number of confirmed cases rose to 135,931 and the death toll to 4,672, exceeding the death toll in China.
- On 30 December, the total number of confirmed cases rose to 137,918 and the death toll to 4,788.
- On 31 December, the total number of confirmed cases rose to 138,850 and the death toll to 4,838.

=== January 2021 ===
- By 15 January the total number of confirmed cases had risen to 147,860 and the death toll to 5,421.
- By 31 January the total number of confirmed cases had risen to 156,957 and the death toll to 5,796.

=== February 2021 ===
- By 26 February, the anniversary of the first case in Greece, the total number of confirmed cases had risen to 188,201 and the death toll to 6,439.

=== March 2021 ===
- By 5 March, the total number of confirmed cases had risen to 201,677, crossing the 200,000-mark, and the death toll to 6,664.
- By 13 March the total number of confirmed cases had risen to 217,018 and the death toll to 6,986. A total of 855,151 people had been given the first dose of vaccine and the country extended its lockdown until March 16, 2021.
- By 14 March Greece had administered at least 1,283,472 doses of COVID vaccines to the population. Greece reported a total 7,038 coronavirus-related deaths since the pandemic began.
- In March there were 72,589 new cases and 1,589 deaths, bringing the total number of confirmed cases to 263,689, including 8,093 deaths.

=== April 2021 ===
- By mid-April the total number of confirmed cases had risen to 313,444 and the death toll stood at 9,397.
- In April there were 81,344 new cases and 2,288 deaths, bringing the total number of confirmed cases to 345,033, including 10,381 deaths.

=== May 2021 ===
- By 16 May the total number of confirmed cases had risen to 375,831 and the death toll to 11,365.
- In May there were 57,273 new cases and 1,714 deaths, bringing the total number of confirmed cases to 402,306, including 12,095 deaths.

=== June 2021 ===
- By 15 June the total number of confirmed cases had risen to 416,195 and the death toll to 12,465.
- In June there were 20,150 new cases and 611 deaths, bringing the total number of confirmed cases to 422,456, including 12,706 deaths.

=== July 2021 ===
- By 16 July the total number of confirmed cases had risen to 453,200 and the death toll to 12,833.
- In the whole of July there were 70,848 new cases and 259 deaths, bringing the total number of confirmed cases to 493,304, including 12,965 deaths.

=== August 2021 ===
- By 3 August, the total number of confirmed cases had risen to 501,030, crossing the 500,000-mark, and the total number of deaths had risen to 12,972.
- By 16 August the total number of confirmed cases had risen to 539,337 and the death toll to 13,237.
- During the month there were 94,960 new cases and 726 deaths, bringing the total number of confirmed cases to 587,964, including 13,691 deaths.

=== September 2021 ===
- By 16 September the total number of confirmed cases had risen to 625,083 and the death toll to 14,354.
- During the month there were 67,803 new cases and 1,137 deaths, bringing the total number of confirmed cases to 655,767, including 14,828 deaths.

=== October 2021 ===
- By 16 October the total number of confirmed cases had risen to 692,197 and the death toll to 15,348.
- During the month there were 86,403 new cases and 1,110 deaths, bringing the total number of confirmed cases to 742,170, including 15,938 deaths.

=== November 2021 ===
- Due to increased infections, new restrictions were established on November 6. Those vaccinated against COVID-19 have to present their vaccination certificates, while unvaccinated people are required to present a negative COVID test to enter all shops, banks and public indoor areas, as well as outdoor restaurants and cafes. Exceptions were made for food shops, pharmacies and places of worship. All public and private employees have to present a negative COVID test twice a week. Police inspections for breaches of the restrictions were increased, and businesses were subject to an increased fine for non-compliance.
- By 16 November the total number of confirmed cases had risen to 847,188 and the death toll to 16,923.
- During the month there were 196,733 new cases and 2,219 deaths, bringing the total number of confirmed cases to 938,903, including 18,157 deaths.

=== December 2021 ===
- A vaccination mandate for all residents of Greece over the age of 60 was approved by lawmakers on 1 December. Monthly fines of €100 will be issued for non-compliance after 16 January. Prime Minister Kyriakos Mitsotakis proposed the mandate to deal with an infection surge and the relative vulnerability of this age group. Exceptions apply for those who have recovered from COVID-19 in the last six months, and those who have serious illnesses like autism or epilepsy.
- Greece's first case of the Omicron variant was confirmed in Crete on 2 December.
- By 16 December the total number of confirmed cases had risen to 1,022,141 and the death toll to 19,651.
- During the month there were 271,950 new cases and 2,633 deaths, bringing the total number of confirmed cases to 1,210,853, including 20,790 deaths.

=== January 2022 ===
- By 16 January the total number of confirmed cases had risen to 1,660,871 and the death toll to 21,984.
- During the month there were 729,870 new cases and 2,710 deaths, bringing the total number of confirmed cases to 1,940,723, including 23,500 deaths.

=== February 2022 ===
- By 14 February the total number of confirmed cases had risen to 2,194,453 and the death toll to 24,836.
- During the month there were 480,941 new cases and 2,360 deaths, bringing the total number of confirmed cases to 2,421,664, including 25,860 deaths.

=== March 2022 ===
- By 16 March the total number of confirmed cases had risen to 2,708,610 and the death toll to 26,730.
- During the month there were 608,765 new cases and 1,650 deaths, bringing the total number of confirmed cases to 3,030,429, including 27,510 deaths.

=== April 2022 ===
- By 15 April the total number of confirmed cases had risen to 3,224,479 and the death toll to 28,488.
- During the month there were 293,493 new cases and 1,643 deaths, bringing the total number of confirmed cases to 3,323,922, including 29,153 deaths.

=== May 2022 ===
- By 16 May the total number of confirmed cases had risen to 3,395,641 and the death toll to 29,576.
- On 18 May, Greece said that it will lift restrictions by removing the mandatory wearing of face mask in airplanes and indoor public venues as it prepare for peak of tourism season.
- During the month there were 129,307 new cases and 692 deaths, bringing the total number of confirmed cases to 3,453,229, including 29,845 deaths.

=== June 2022 ===
- By 15 June the total number of confirmed cases had risen to 3,517,898 and the death toll to 30,049.
- During the month there were 223,273 new cases and 387 deaths, bringing the total number of confirmed cases to 3,676,502, including 30,232 deaths.

=== July 2022 ===
- By 17 July the total number of confirmed cases had risen to 4,210,771 and the death toll to 30,707.
- During the month there were 798,114 new cases and 1,145 deaths, bringing the total number of confirmed cases to 4,474,616, including 31,377 deaths.

=== August 2022 ===
- By 14 August the total number of confirmed cases had risen to 4,654,737 and the death toll to 32,028.
- During the month there were 288,211 new cases and 1,175 deaths, bringing the total number of confirmed cases to 4,762,827, including 32,552 deaths.

=== September 2022 ===
- By 11 September the total number of confirmed cases had risen to 4,838,811 and the death toll to 32,894.
- By 25 September the total number of confirmed cases had risen to 4,920,192 and the death toll to 33,111.

=== October 2022 ===
- By 16 October the total number of confirmed cases had risen to 5,081,981 and the death toll to 33,426.
- By 30 October the total number of confirmed cases had risen to 5,188,890 and the death toll to 33,750.

=== November 2022 ===
- By 13 November the total number of confirmed cases had risen to 5,306,482 and the death toll to 34,024.
- By 27 November the total number of confirmed cases had risen to 5,404,690 and the death toll to 34,309.

=== December 2022 ===
- By 11 December the total number of confirmed cases had risen to 5,500,737 and the death toll to 34,614.
- By the end of 2022 the number of confirmed cases had risen to 5,627,240 and the death toll to 35,057.

== COVID-19 cases in Greece ==
Data for February to July 2020
| Date | Confirmed New | Deaths New | Recoveries New | Confirmed Total | Deaths Total | Recoveries Total | In Intensive Care (total on that date) | Cumulative total tests performed |
|---|---|---|---|---|---|---|---|---|
| 26 February 2020 | 1 | 0 | 0 | 1 | 0 | 0 | 0 | 0 |
| 27 February | 2 | 0 | 0 | 3 | 0 | 0 | 0 | 0 |
| 28 February | 1 | 0 | 0 | 4 | 0 | 0 | 0 | 0 |
| 29 February | 3 | 0 | 0 | 7 | 0 | 0 | 0 | 0 |
| 1 March | 0 | 0 | 0 | 7 | 0 | 0 | 0 | 0 |
| 2 March | 0 | 0 | 0 | 7 | 0 | 0 | 0 | 504 |
| 3 March | 0 | 0 | 0 | 7 | 0 | 0 | 0 | 570 |
| 4 March | 2 | 0 | 0 | 9 | 0 | 0 | 0 | 0 |
| 5 March | 22 | 0 | 0 | 31 | 0 | 0 | 0 | 0 |
| 6 March | 14 | 0 | 0 | 45 | 0 | 0 | 1 | 0 |
| 7 March | 21 | 0 | 0 | 66 | 0 | 0 | 0 | 0 |
| 8 March | 7 | 0 | 0 | 73 | 0 | 0 | 0 | 0 |
| 9 March | 11 | 0 | 0 | 84 | 0 | 0 | 1 | 0 |
| 10 March | 5 | 0 | 0 | 89 | 0 | 0 | 1 | 0 |
| 11 March | 10 | 0 | 0 | 99 | 0 | 0 | 2 | 1,700 |
| 12 March | 18 | 1 | 2 | 117 | 1 | 2 | 3 | 2,180 |
| 13 March | 73 | 0 | 0 | 190 | 1 | 2 | 5 | 2,700 |
| 14 March | 38 | 2 | 6 | 228 | 3 | 8 | 5 | 3,400 |
| 15 March | 103 | 1 | 2 | 331 | 4 | 10 | 8 | 4,000 |
| 16 March | 21 | 0 | 0 | 352 | 4 | 10 | 9 | 4,320 |
| 17 March | 35 | 1 | 4 | 387 | 5 | 14 | 11 | 4,900 |
| 18 March | 31 | 0 | 0 | 418 | 5 | 14 | 13 | 6,000 |
| 19 March | 46 | 1 | 5 | 464 | 6 | 19 | 16 | — |
| 20 March | 31 | 4 | 0 | 495 | 10 | 19 | 20 | 7,172 |
| 21 March | 35 | 3 | 0 | 530 | 13 | 19 | 18 | 7,830 |
| 22 March | 94 | 2 | 0 | 624 | 15 | 19 | 34 | 8,006 |
| 23 March | 71 | 2 | 10 | 695 | 17 | 29 | 34 | 8,644 |
| 24 March | 48 | 3 | 3 | 743 | 20 | 32 | 45 | 9,071 |
| 25 March | 78 | 2 | 4 | 821 | 22 | 36 | 53 | 10,495 |
| 26 March | 71 | 4 | 6 | 892 | 26 | 42 | 57 | — |
| 27 March | 74 | 2 | 10 | 966 | 28 | 52 | 66 | 13,477 |
| 28 March | 95 | 4 | — | 1,061 | 32 | 52 | 69 | 14,363 |
| 29 March | 95 | 6 | 1 | 1,156 | 38 | 53 | 69 | 15,151 |
| 30 March | 56 | 5 | — | 1,212 | 43 | 53 | 72 | 15,961 |
| 31 March | 102 | 6 | — | 1,314 | 49 | 53 | 85 | 16,732 |
| 1 April | 101 | 1 | — | 1,415 | 50 | 53 | 90 | 17,350 |
| 2 April | 129 | 3 | — | 1,544 | 53 | 53 | 91 | 18,844 |
| 3 April | 69 | 6 | — | 1,613 | 59 | 53 | 92 | 22,437 |
| 4 April | 60 | 9 | — | 1,673 | 68 | 53 | 91 | 23,333 |
| 5 April | 62 | 5 | — | 1,735 | 73 | 53 | 93 | 25,453 |
| 6 April | 20 | 6 | 216 | 1,755 | 79 | 269 | 90 | 26,193 |
| 7 April | 77 | 2 | | 1,832 | 81 | 269 | 90 | 28,584 |
| 8 April | 52 | 2 | | 1,884 | 83 | 269 | 84 | 32,528 |
| 9 April | 71 | 3 | | 1,955 | 86 | 269 | 79 | 33,634 |
| 10 April | 54 | 4 | | 2,009 | 90 | 269 | 77 | 35,432 |
| 11 April | 72 | 3 | | 2,081 | 93 | 269 | 75 | 37,344 |
| 12 April | 33 | 5 | | 2,114 | 98 | 269 | 76 | 42,261 |
| 13 April | 31 | 1 | | 2,145 | 99 | 269 | 73 | 43,431 |
| 14 April | 25 | 2 | | 2,170 | 101 | 269 | 76 | 45,798 |
| 15 April | 22 | 1 | | 2,192 | 102 | 269 | 72 | 47,389 |
| 16 April | 15 | 3 | | 2,207 | 105 | 269 | 69 | 49,390 |
| 17 April | 17 | 3 | | 2,224 | 108 | 269 | 71 | 51,645 |
| 18 April | 11 | 2 | | 2,235 | 110 | 269 | 67 | 53,290 |
| 19 April | — | 3 | — | — | 113 | — | — | — |
| 20 April | 10 | 3 | — | 2,245 | 116 | 269 | 61 | 54,344 |
| 21 April | 156 | 5 | — | 2,401 | 121 | 269 | 59 | 55,666 |
| 22 April | 7 | 0 | — | 2,408 | 121 | 269 | 55 | 56,992 |
| 23 April | 55 | 4 | — | 2,463 | 125 | 269 | 52 | 59,241 |
| 24 April | 27 | 5 | — | 2,490 | 130 | 269 | 48 | 61,407 |
| 25 April | 16 | 0 | — | 2,506 | 130 | 269 | 47 | 63,087 |
| 26 April | 11 | 4 | — | 2,517 | 134 | 269 | 46 | 64,608 |
| 27 April | 17 | 2 | — | 2,534 | 136 | 269 | 43 | 66,094 |
| 28 April | 32 | 2 | — | 2,566 | 138 | 269 | 40 | 69,833 |
| 29 April | 10 | 1 | — | 2,576 | 139 | 269 | 41 | 72,130 |
| 30 April | 15 | 1 | | 2,591 | 140 | 1,374 | 38 | 75,170 |
| 1 May | 21 | 0 | | 2,612 | 140 | 1,374 | 36 | 77,251 |
| 2 May | 8 | 3 | | 2,620 | 143 | 1,374 | 37 | 78,207 |
| 3 May | 6 | 1 | | 2,626 | 144 | 1,442 | 37 | 79,332 |
| 4 May | 6 | 2 | | 2,632 | 146 | | 35 | 80,951 |
| 5 May | 10 | 0 | | 2,642 | 146 | | 35 | 83,750 |
| 6 May | 21 | 1 | | 2,663 | 147 | | 36 | 87,052 |
| 7 May | 15 | 1 | | 2,678 | 148 | | 33 | 90,043 |
| 8 May | 13 | 2 | | 2,691 | 150 | | 32 | 94,291 |
| 9 May | 19 | 1 | | 2,710 | 151 | | 28 | 97,384 |
| 10 May | 6 | 0 | | 2,716 | 151 | | 30 | 98,877 |
| 11 May | 10 | 0 | | 2,726 | 151 | | 32 | 99,363 |
| 12 May | 18 | 1 | | 2,744 | 152 | | 32 | 106,054 |
| 13 May | 16 | 3 | | 2,760 | 155 | | 28 | 112,042 |
| 14 May | 10 | 1 | | 2,770 | 156 | | 24 | 116,233 |
| 15 May | 40 | 4 | | 2,810 | 160 | | 23 | 120,015 |
| 16 May | 9 | 2 | | 2,819 | 162 | | 23 | 126,283 |
| 17 May | 15 | 1 | | 2,834 | 163 | | 22 | 128,525 |
| 18 May | 2 | 2 | | 2,836 | 165 | | 24 | 131,684 |
| 19 May | 4 | 0 | | 2,840 | 165 | | 22 | 136,001 |
| 20 May | 10 | 1 | | 2,850 | 166 | | 22 | 139,445 |
| 21 May | 3 | 1 | | 2,853 | 168 | | 21 | 144,078 |
| 22 May | 21 | 1 | | 2,873 | 169 | | 19 | 147,958 |
| 23 May | 3 | 2 | | 2,876 | 171 | | 20 | 152,998 |
| 24 May | 2 | 0 | | 2,878 | 171 | | 19 | 153,963 |
| 25 May | 4 | 1 | | 2,882 | 172 | | 18 | 155,037 |
| 26 May | 7 | 1 | | 2,889 | 173 | | 18 | 160,991 |
| 27 May | 18 | 0 | | 2,903 | 173 | | 17 | 166,245 |
| 28 May | 3 | 2 | | 2,906 | 175 | | 16 | 170,467 |
| 29 May | 5 | 0 | | 2,909 | 175 | | 16 | 174,844 |
| 30 May | 7 | 0 | | 2,915 | 175 | | 14 | 178,316 |
| 31 May | 2 | 0 | | 2,917 | 175 | | 13 | 180,518 |
| 1 June | 2 | 4 | | 2,918 | 179 | | 12 | 182,423 |
| 2 June | 19 | 0 | | 2,937 | 179 | | 11 | 185,590 |
| 3–4 June | 15 | 1 | | 2,952 | 180 | | 9 | 193,929 |
| 5–8 June | 97 | 2 | | 3,049 | 182 | | 10 | 229,519 |
| 9 June | 9 | 1 | | 3,058 | 183 | | 10 | 231,759 |
| 10 June | 11 | 0 | | 3068 | 183 | | 12 | 240,924 |
| 11 June | 20 | 0 | | 3,088 | 183 | | 14 | 237,276 |
| 12 June | 20 | 0 | | 3,108 | 183 | | 14 | 243,867 |
| 13 June | 4 | 0 | | 3,112 | 183 | | 13 | 247,452 |
| 14 June | 9 | 0 | | 3,121 | 183 | | 13 | 250,923 |
| 15 June | 13 | 1 | | 3,134 | 184 | | 13 | 254,854 |
| 16 June | 15 | 1 | | 3,148 | 185 | | 12 | 259,736 |
| 17 June | 55 | 2 | | 3,203 | 187 | | 11 | 264,930 |
| 18 June | 24 | 1 | | 3,227 | 188 | | 10 | 270,338 |
| 19 June | 10 | 1 | | 3,237 | 189 | | 10 | 274,711 |
| 20 June | 19 | 1 | | 3,256 | 190 | | 9 | 278,895 |
| 21 June | 10 | 0 | | 3,266 | 190 | | 9 | 283,146 |
| 22 June | 21 | 0 | | 3,287 | 190 | | 8 | 285,989 |
| 23 June | 16 | 0 | | 3,302 | 190 | | 8 | 291,187 |
| 24 June | 8 | 0 | | 3,310 | 190 | | 8 | 295,639 |
| 25 June | 13 | 1 | | 3,321 | 191 | | 9 | 291,840 |
| 26 June | 22 | 0 | | 3,343 | 191 | | 11 | 295,851 |
| 27 June | 23 | 0 | | 3,366 | 191 | | 11 | 301,144 |
| 28 June | 10 | 0 | | 3,376 | 191 | | 10 | 305,137 |
| 29 June | 15 | 0 | | 3,390 | 191 | | 10 | 308,392 |
| 30 June | 20 | 1 | | 3,409 | 192 | | 9 | 312,775 |
| 1 July 2020 | 23 | 0 | | 3,432 | 192 | | 9 | 315,982 |
| 2 July | 28 | 0 | | 3,458 | 192 | | 8 | 320,427 |
| 3 July | 28 | 0 | | 3,486 | 192 | | 8 | 325,451 |
| 4 July | 25 | 0 | | 3,511 | 192 | | 11 | 331,703 |
| 5 July | 9 | 0 | | 3,519 | 192 | | 11 | 337,154 |
| 6 July | 43 | 0 | | 3,562 | 192 | | 11 | 340,328 |
| 7 July | 27 | 1 | | 3,589 | 193 | | 10 | 349,084 |
| 8 July | 33 | 0 | | 3,622 | 193 | | 9 | 355,190 |
| 9 July | 50 | 0 | | 3,672 | 193 | | 9 | 358,725 |
| 10 July | 60 | 0 | | 3,732 | 193 | | 9 | 363,412 |
| 11 July | 41 | 0 | | 3,772 | 193 | | 9 | 371,167 |
| 12 July | 31 | 0 | | 3,803 | 193 | | 10 | 373,932 |
| 13 July | 24 | 0 | | 3,826 | 193 | | 12 | 382,452 |
| 14 July | 58 | 0 | | 3,883 | 193 | | 13 | 386,307 |
| 15 July | 27 | 0 | | 3,910 | 193 | | 13 | 391,773 |
| 16 July | 35 | 0 | | 3,939 | 193 | | 14 | 398,347 |
| 17 July | 28 | 1 | | 3,964 | 194 | | 12 | 402,672 |
| 18 July | 19 | 0 | | 3,983 | 194 | | 12 | 406,040 |
| 19 July | 24 | 0 | | 4,007 | 194 | 3,377 | 13 | 410,766 |
| 20 July | 11 | 1 | | 4,012 | 195 | | 12 | 413760 |
| 21 July | 36 | 2 | | 4,048 | 197 | | 10 | 419,906 |
| 22 July | 32 | 3 | | 4,077 | 200 | | 10 | 424,675 |
| 23 July | 33 | 1 | | 4,110 | 201 | | 8 | 430,864 |
| 24 July | 26 | 0 | | 4,135 | 201 | | 8 | 436,510 |
| 25 July | 31 | 0 | | 4,166 | 201 | | 10 | 440,156 |
| 26 July | 27 | 1 | | 4,193 | 202 | 3,562 | 9 | 447,685 |
| 27 July | 35 | 0 | | 4,227 | 202 | | 9 | 451,317 |
| 28 July | 52 | 1 | | 4,279 | 203 | | 8 | 457,540 |
| 29 July | 57 | 0 | | 4,336 | 203 | | 8 | 511,429 |
| 30 July | 65 | 0 | | 4,401 | 203 | | 7 | 519,887 |
| 31 July | 78 | 3 | | 4,477 | 206 | | 9 | 529,855 |

Data for August to November 2020
| Date | Confirmed New | Deaths New | Recoveries New | Confirmed Total | Deaths Total | Recoveries Total | In Intensive Care (total on that date) | Cumulative total tests performed |
|---|---|---|---|---|---|---|---|---|
| 1 August | 110 | 0 | | 4,587 | 206 | | 7 | 539,493 |
| 2 August | 75 | 2 | | 4,662 | 208 | 3,804 | 12 | 545,439 |
| 3 August | 77 | 1 | | 4,773 | 209 | | 13 | 564,856 |
| 4 August | 121 | 0 | | 4,855 | 209 | | 13 | 599,709 |
| 5 August | 124 | 1 | | 4,973 | 210 | | 13 | 609,583 |
| 6 August | 153 | 0 | | 5,123 | 210 | | 14 | 619,393 |
| 7 August | 151 | 0 | | 5,270 | 210 | | 14 | 630,983 |
| 8 August | 152 | 1 | | 5,421 | 211 | | 17 | 640,297 |
| 9 August | 203 | 1 | | 5,623 | 212 | 3,987 | 22 | 650,998 |
| 10 August | 126 | 1 | | 5,749 | 213 | | 24 | 658,178 |
| 11 August | 196 | 1 | | 5,942 | 214 | | 26 | 668,739 |
| 12 August | 262 | 2 | | 6,177 | 216 | | 24 | 679,785 |
| 13 August | 204 | 5 | | 6,381 | 221 | | 22 | 687,338 |
| 14 August | 254 | 2 | | 6,632 | 223 | | 22 | 704,921 |
| 15 August | 230 | 3 | | 6,858 | 226 | | 23 | 715,503 |
| 16 August | 217 | 2 | | 7,075 | 228 | | 24 | 719,311 |
| 17 August | 150 | 2 | | 7,222 | 230 | | 23 | 726,961 |
| 18 August | 269 | 2 | | 7,472 | 232 | | 25 | 740,871 |
| 19 August | 217 | 3 | | 7,684 | 235 | | 28 | 804,282 |
| 20 August | 269 | 0 | | 7,934 | 235 | | 30 | 816,450 |
| 21 August | 209 | 3 | | 8,138 | 238 | | 28 | 826,804 |
| 22 August | 264 | 2 | | 8,381 | 240 | | 31 | 838,015 |
| 23 August | 284 | 2 | | 8,664 | 242 | | 31 | 848,380 |
| 24 August | 170 | 0 | | 8,819 | 242 | | 31 | 858,138 |
| 25 August | 168 | 1 | | 8,987 | 243 | | 31 | 872,550 |
| 26 August | 293 | 5 | | 9,280 | 248 | | 33 | 887,991 |
| 27 August | 259 | 6 | | 9,531 | 254 | | 35 | 903,432 |
| 28 August | 270 | 5 | | 9,800 | 259 | | 35 | 917,265 |
| 29 August | 177 | 1 | | 9,977 | 260 | | 35 | 931,002 |
| 30 August | 157 | 2 | | 10,134 | 262 | 6,486 | 35 | 940,882 |
| 31 August | 183 | 4 | | 10,317 | 266 | | 35 | 949,367 |
| 1 September | 207 | 5 | | 10,524 | 271 | | 38 | 966,346 |
| 2 September | 233 | 2 | | 10,757 | 273 | | 38 | 980,500 |
| 3 September | 241 | 5 | | 10,998 | 278 | | 39 | 992,566 |
| 4 September | 202 | 1 | | 11,200 | 279 | | 38 | 1,003,142 |
| 5 September | 187 | 1 | | 11,386 | 280 | | 38 | 1,015,064 |
| 6 September | 144 | 4 | | 11,524 | 284 | | 38 | 1,027,618 |
| 7 September | 156 | 5 | | 11,663 | 289 | | 42 | 1,037,836 |
| 8 September | 169 | 1 | | 11,832 | 290 | | 42 | 1,050,259 |
| 9 September | 248 | 3 | | 12,080 | 293 | 7,262 | 46 | 1,066,305 |
| 10 September | 372 | 4 | | 12,452 | 297 | | 49 | 1,082,401 |
| 11 September | 287 | 3 | | 12,734 | 300 | | 52 | 1,094,354 |
| 12 September | 302 | 2 | | 13,036 | 302 | | 53 | 1,112,992 |
| 13 September | 207 | 3 | | 13,240 | 305 | | 54 | 1,125,882 |
| 14 September | 180 | 5 | | 13,420 | 310 | | 59 | 1,133,027 |
| 15 September | 310 | 3 | | 13,730 | 313 | | 67 | 1,144,549 |
| 16 September | 312 | 3 | | 14,041 | 316 | | 67 | 1,157,897 |
| 17 September | 359 | 9 | | 14,400 | 325 | | 69 | 1,170,292 |
| 18 September | 339 | 2 | | 14,738 | 327 | | 71 | 1,181,712 |
| 19 September | 240 | 4 | | 14,978 | 331 | | 65 | 1,194,013 |
| 20 September | 170 | 7 | | 15,142 | 338 | | 78 | 1,202,213 |
| 21 September | 453 | 6 | | 15,595 | 344 | | 79 | 1,210,118 |
| 22 September | 346 | 8 | | 15,928 | 352 | | 77 | 1,221,017 |
| 23 September | 358 | 5 | | 16,286 | 357 | | 73 | 1,232,229 |
| 24 September | 342 | 9 | | 16,627 | 366 | | 68 | 1,246,363 |
| 25 September | 286 | 3 | | 16,913 | 369 | | 63 | 1,256,436 |
| 26 September | 315 | 7 | | 17,228 | 376 | | 68 | 1,269,055 |
| 27 September | 218 | 3 | | 17,444 | 379 | | 68 | 1,278,587 |
| 28 September | 269 | 4 | | 17,707 | 383 | | 73 | 1,284,694 |
| 29 September | 416 | 5 | | 18,123 | 388 | | 79 | 1,296,795 |
| 30 September | 354 | 3 | | 18,475 | 391 | | 78 | 1,307,549 |
| 1 October | 411 | 2 | | 18,886 | 393 | | 89 | 1,318,336 |
| 2 October | 460 | 5 | | 19,346 | 398 | | 85 | 1,328,042 |
| 3 October | 267 | 7 | | 19,613 | 405 | | 79 | 1,339,664 |
| 4 October | 229 | 4 | | 19,842 | 409 | | 82 | 1,349,123 |
| 5 October | 303 | 8 | | 20,142 | 417 | | 83 | 1,355,126 |
| 6 October | 399 | 3 | | 20,541 | 420 | | 87 | 1,367,231 |
| 7 October | 407 | 4 | | 20,947 | 424 | | 88 | 1,379,036 |
| 8 October | 436 | 6 | | 21,381 | 430 | | 91 | 1,390,270 |
| 9 October | 391 | 1 | | 21,772 | 431 | | 98 | 1,400,857 |
| 10 October | 306 | 5 | | 22,078 | 436 | | 100 | 1,413,838 |
| 11 October | 280 | 13 | | 22,358 | 449 | | 93 | 1,423,000 |
| 12 October | 295 | 7 | | 22,652 | 456 | | 91 | 1,429,670 |
| 13 October | 408 | 6 | | 23,060 | 462 | | 89 | 1,449,231 |
| 14 October | 436 | 7 | | 23,495 | 469 | | 86 | 1,469,357 |
| 15 October | 453 | 13 | | 23,947 | 482 | | 82 | 1,489,213 |
| 16 October | 508 | 8 | | 24,450 | 490 | | 81 | 1,508,460 |
| 17 October | 482 | 10 | | 24,932 | 500 | | 83 | 1,527,258 |
| 18 October | 438 | 9 | | 25,370 | 509 | | 84 | 1,542,156 |
| 19 October | 438 | 11 | | 25,802 | 520 | | 85 | 1,549,392 |
| 20 October | 667 | 8 | | 26,469 | 528 | | 87 | 1,568,798 |
| 21 October | 865 | 6 | | 27,334 | 534 | | 86 | 1,588,713 |
| 22 October | 882 | 15 | | 28,216 | 549 | | 90 | 1,609,040 |
| 23 October | 841 | 10 | | 29,057 | 559 | | 89 | 1,629,489 |
| 24 October | 935 | 5 | | 29,992 | 564 | | 91 | 1,649,561 |
| 25 October | 790 | 10 | | 30,782 | 574 | | 84 | 1,666,151 |
| 26 October | 715 | 7 | | 31,496 | 581 | | 95 | 1,678,129 |
| 27 October | 1259 | 12 | | 32,752 | 593 | | 102 | 1,698,327 |
| 28 October | 1547 | 10 | | 34,299 | 603 | | 108 | 1,718,450 |
| 29 October | 1211 | 12 | | 35,510 | 615 | | 114 | 1,730,519 |
| 30 October | 1690 | 5 | | 37,196 | 620 | | 128 | 1,753,842 |
| 31 October | 2056 | 6 | | 39,251 | 626 | | 135 | 1,777,322 |
| 1 November | 1678 | 9 | | 40,929 | 635 | | 140 | 1,792,030 |
| 2 November | 1152 | 7 | | 42,080 | 642 | | 153 | 1,804,016 |
| 3 November | 2166 | 13 | | 44,246 | 655 | | 169 | 1,829,091 |
| 4 November | 2646 | 18 | | 46,892 | 673 | | 179 | 1,853,295 |
| 5 November | 2917 | 29 | | 49,807 | 702 | | 187 | 1,876,471 |
| 6 November | 2448 | 14 | | 52,254 | 715 | | 196 | 1,902,458 |
| 7 November | 2556 | 34 | | 54,809 | 749 | | 207 | 1,926,544 |
| 8 November | 1914 | 35 | | 56,689 | 784 | | 228 | 1,941,656 |
| 9 November | 1490 | 41 | | 58,187 | 825 | | 239 | 1,952,343 |
| 10 November | 2384 | 41 | | 60,570 | 866 | | 263 | 1,977,560 |
| 11 November | 2752 | 43 | | 63,321 | 909 | | 297 | 2,003,274 |
| 12 November | 3316 | 50 | | 66,637 | 959 | | 310 | 2,028,196 |
| 13 November | 3038 | 38 | | 69,675 | 997 | | 336 | 2,053,166 |
| 14 November | 2835 | 38 | | 72,510 | 1,035 | | 366 | 2,078,062 |
| 15 November | 1698 | 71 | | 74,205 | 1,106 | | 392 | 2,092,324 |
| 16 November | 2198 | 59 | | 76,403 | 1,165 | | 400 | 2,104,235 |
| 17 November | 2422 | 63 | | 78,825 | 1,228 | | 443 | 2,128,189 |
| 18 November | 3209 | 60 | | 82,034 | 1,288 | | 480 | 2,153,954 |
| 19 November | 3227 | 59 | | 85,261 | 1,347 | | 499 | |
| 20 November | 2581 | 72 | | 87,812 | 1,419 | | 519 | 2,200,427 |
| 21 November | 2311 | 108 | | 90,121 | 1,527 | | 522 | 2,223,225 |
| 22 November | 1498 | 103 | | 91,619 | 1,630 | | 540 | 2,235,923 |
| 23 November | 1388 | 84 | | 93,006 | 1,714 | | 549 | 2,247,132 |
| 24 November | 2135 | 101 | | 93,006 | 1,815 | | 562 | 2,269,298 |
| 25 November | 2152 | 87 | | 97,288 | 1,902 | | 597 | 2,290,659 |
| 26 November | 2018 | 99 | | 99,306 | 2,001 | | 608 | 2,311,870 |
| 27 November | 2013 | 101 | | 101,287 | 2,102 | | 607 | 2,332,931 |
| 28 November | 1747 | 121 | | 103,034 | 2,223 | | 606 | 2,354,043 |
| 29 November | 1193 | 98 | | 104,227 | 2,321 | | 603 | 2,366,363 |
| 30 November | 1044 | 85 | | 105,271 | 2,406 | | 600 | 2,373,566 |

Data for December 2020 to January 2021
| Date | Confirmed New | Deaths New | Recoveries New | Confirmed Total | Deaths Total | Recoveries Total | In Intensive Care (total on that date) | Cumulative total tests performed |
|---|---|---|---|---|---|---|---|---|
| 1 December | 2199 | 111 | | 107,470 | 2,517 | | 597 | 2,394,598 |
| 2 December | 2186 | 89 | | 109,655 | 2,606 | | 613 | 2,413,710 |
| 3 December | 1882 | 100 | | 111,537 | 2,706 | | 622 | 2,432,614 |
| 4 December | 1667 | 98 | | 113,185 | 2,804 | | 612 | 2,450,855 |
| 5 December | 1383 | 98 | | 114,568 | 2,902 | | 594 | 2,469,947 |
| 6 December | 904 | 101 | | 115,471 | 3,003 | | 600 | 2,479,161 |
| 7 December | 1,251 | 89 | | 116,721 | 3,092 | | 600 | 2,485,266 |
| 8 December | 1,382 | 102 | | 118,045 | 3,194 | | 579 | 2,504,704 |
| 9 December | 1,675 | 95 | | 119,720 | 3,289 | | 578 | |
| 10 December | 1,533 | 81 | | 121,253 | 3,370 | | 571 | |
| 11 December | 1,395 | 102 | | 122,648 | 3,472 | | 583 | |
| 12 December | 1,194 | 68 | | 123,842 | 3,540 | | 577 | 2,572,828 |
| 13 December | 693 | 85 | | 124,534 | 3,625 | | 552 | 2,582,260 |
| 14 December | 639 | 62 | | 125,173 | 3,687 | | 558 | 2,589,438 |
| 15 December | 1,240 | 98 | | 126,372 | 3,785 | | 550 | 2,607,015 |
| 16 December | 1,190 | 85 | | 127,557 | 3,870 | | 552 | 2,624,305 |
| 17 December | 1,155 | 78 | | 128,710 | 3,948 | | 542 | 2,640,158 |
| 18 December | 916 | 96 | | 129,584 | 4,044 | | 527 | 2,657,007 |
| 19 December | 901 | 58 | | 130,485 | 4,102 | | 534 | 2,674,207 |
| 20 December | 588 | 70 | | 131,072 | 4,172 | | 515 | 2,682,846 |
| 21 December | 526 | 85 | | 131,597 | 4,257 | | 505 | 2,687,812 |
| 22 December | 853 | 83 | | 132,430 | 4,340 | | 491 | 2,704,574 |
| 23 December | 937 | 62 | | 133,365 | 4,402 | | 495 | 2,719,872 |
| 24 December | 873 | 55 | | 134,235 | 4,457 | | 476 | 2,733,988 |
| 25 December | 617 | 50 | | 134,852 | 4,507 | | 470 | 2,749,537 |
| 26 December | 262 | 46 | | 135,114 | 4,553 | | 473 | 2,752,754 |
| 27 December | 342 | 53 | | 135,456 | 4,606 | | 469 | 2,756,221 |
| 28 December | 473 | 66 | | 135,929 | 4,672 | | 467 | 2,759,530 |
| 29 December | 1047 | 58 | | 136,976 | 4,730 | | 458 | 2,775,021 |
| 30 December | 942 | 58 | | 137,918 | 4,788 | | 443 | 2,789,454 |
| 31 December | 932 | 50 | | 138,850 | 4,838 | | 438 | 2,803,026 |
| 1 January | 597 | 43 | | 139,447 | 4,881 | | 429 | 2,817,705 |
| 2 January | 262 | 40 | | 139,709 | 4,921 | | 431 | 2,820,861 |
| 3 January | 390 | 36 | | 140,099 | 4,957 | | 421 | 2,825,227 |
| 4 January | 427 | 54 | | 140,526 | 5,011 | | 407 | 2,828,461 |
| 5 January | 928 | 40 | | 141,453 | 5,051 | | 405 | 2,840,278 |
| 6 January | 816 | 48 | | 142,267 | 5,099 | | 399 | 2,854,159 |
| 7 January | 510 | 47 | | 142,777 | 5,146 | | 391 | 2,859,041 |
| 8 January | 721 | 49 | | 143,494 | 5,195 | | 386 | 2,870,898 |
| 9 January | 800 | 32 | | 144,293 | 5,227 | | 362 | 2,882,726 |
| 10 January | 445 | 36 | | 144,738 | 5,263 | | 353 | 2,891,190 |
| 11 January | 444 | 39 | | 145,179 | 5,302 | | 350 | 2,897,143 |
| 12 January | 866 | 27 | | 146,020 | 5,329 | | 337 | 2,907,699 |
| 13 January | 671 | 25 | | 146,688 | 5,354 | | 340 | 2,921,563 |
| 14 January | 599 | 33 | | 147,283 | 5,387 | | 328 | 2,933,838 |
| 15 January | 610 | 34 | | 147,860 | 5,421 | | 319 | 2,945,406 |
| 16 January | 510 | 20 | | 148,370 | 5,441 | | 323 | 2,956,862 |
| 17 January | 237 | 28 | | 148,607 | 5,469 | | 320 | 2,962,952 |
| 18 January | 320 | 19 | | 148,925 | 5,488 | | 322 | 2,966,664 |
| 19 January | 566 | 30 | | 149,462 | 5,518 | | 320 | 2,977,596 |
| 20 January | 516 | 27 | | 149,973 | 5,545 | | 300 | 2,989,339 |
| 21 January | 509 | 25 | | 150,479 | 5,570 | | 293 | 3,000,313 |
| 22 January | 585 | 28 | | 151,041 | 5,598 | | 288 | 3,930,631 |
| 23 January | 605 | 24 | | 151,646 | 5,622 | | 292 | |
| 24 January | 334 | 24 | | 151,980 | 5,646 | | 288 | 3,973,500 |
| 25 January | 436 | 25 | | 152,412 | 5,671 | | 286 | |
| 26 January | 842 | 21 | | 153,226 | 5,692 | | 283 | |
| 27 January | 858 | 32 | | 154,083 | 5,724 | | 274 | |
| 28 January | 716 | 18 | | 154,796 | 5,742 | | 268 | |
| 29 January | 941 | 22 | | 155,700 | 5,764 | | 260 | |
| 30 January | 795 | 15 | | 156,500 | 5,779 | | 257 | |
| 31 January | 484 | 17 | | 156,957 | 5,796 | | 255 | |
| Date | Confirmed New | Deaths New | Recoveries New | Confirmed Total | Deaths Total | Recoveries Total | In Intensive Care (total on that date) | Cumulative total tests performed |

=== Cases by region ===
| Region | Cases | Deaths |
|---|---|---|
| Attica | 5,579 | 127 |
| Central Macedonia | 2,759 | 72 |
| Peloponnese | 339 | 1 |
| Thessaly | 603 | 6 |
| Western Macedonia | 444 | 34 |
| Eastern Macedonia and Thrace | 812 | 32 |
| Western Greece | 190 | 8 |
| Central Greece | 285 | 0 |
| Crete | 465 | 2 |
| Ionian Islands | 275 | 3 |
| Epirus | 142 | 2 |
| South Aegean | 475 | 0 |
| North Aegean | 290 | 9 |
| Mount Athos | 4 | 0 |
| Non residents | 1060 | 1 |
| No Location Provided | 1016 | 33 |

Note: Figures to mid-September 2020 - Source:COVID—19

== Impact ==
=== Economic ===
Greece's tourism industry has been negatively impacted by the crisis, and a 9.7% economic contraction has been predicted for the fiscal year 2020, but demand from home purchases from residents of other European countries has increased as many properties have become available as a result of Greece's economic difficulties. Up to 65% of Greek hotels, including many investment grade properties and commercial developments on Crete, Corfu and Rhodes, are expected to face bankruptcy under current conditions. It's estimated that German property investments in Greece have increased by 50%, especially in the Peloponnese and islands like Crete, Corfu, Karpathos and Amorgos. Greece's successful handling of the pandemic with fewer than 200 deaths and only 3,826 total reported cases has been one of the factors driving the demand for property purchases from other European nations.

== Response measures ==
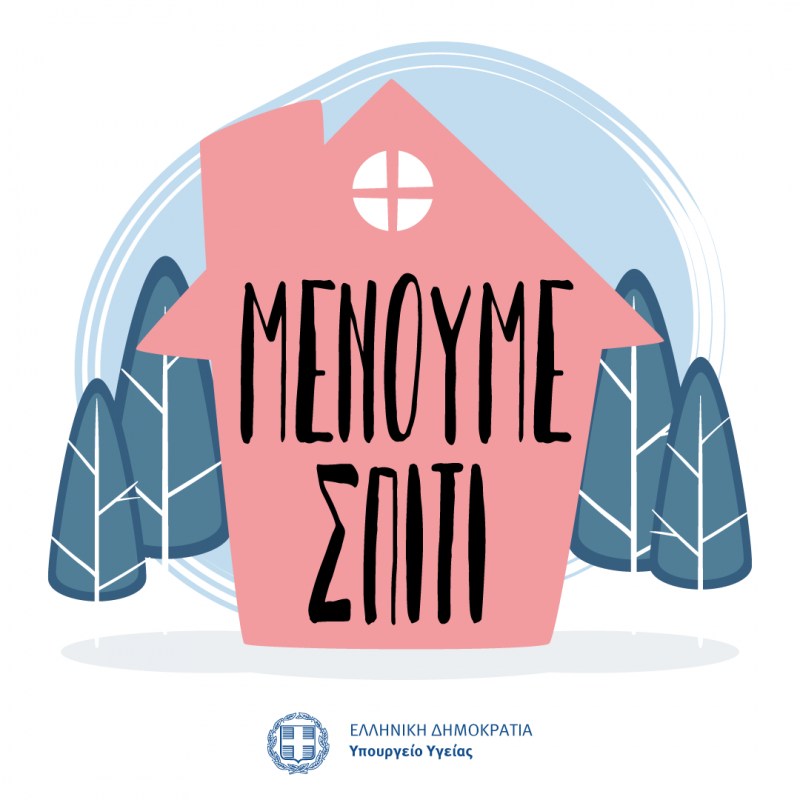
Logo of the "Μένουμε Σπίτι" (We Stay Home) campaign by the Hellenic Ministry of Health

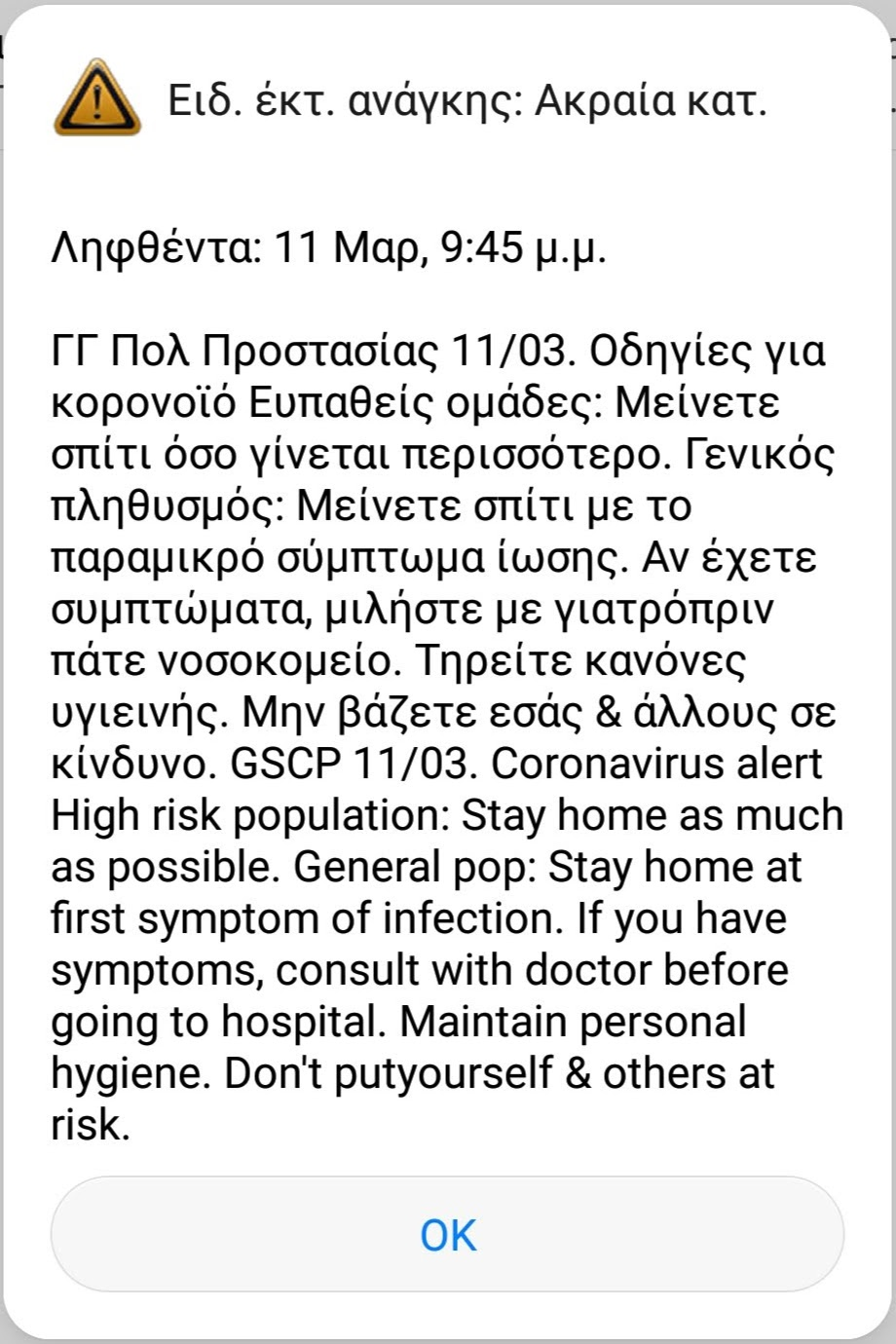
Cell Broadcast Message sent on all smartphones in Greece on March 11 by the General Secretariat for Civil Protection, with general instructions regarding the pandemic

Starting on 16 March, the Hellenic Ministry of Health introduced a daily afternoon live televised briefing with updates on the progression of the pandemic in the country and the government's emergency measures, hosted by Dr. Sotiris Tsiodras, the health ministry spokesman on the COVID-19 pandemic, and Deputy Minister for Civil Protection and Crisis Management Nikos Hardalias, with occasional appearances of other government officials as well. From the beginning of May, the live televised briefings were held three times a week, while a daily COVID-19 report by NPHO on the progression of the disease in the country was published online. On 27 May, after 72 days, the televised briefings ended, while the daily NPHO reports on the daily number of new cases and deaths continued. From mid-July, weekly televised briefings by Hardalias, focusing solely on operational issues, were re-introduced.

=== Restrictions on movements and gatherings ===
On 9 March, all school trips were banned, all sports games were to be played with no fans attending and all school championships were cancelled, and starting on 10 March, all educational institutions were closed for 14 days.

On 16 March two villages in Western Macedonia, Damaskinia and Dragasia, were quarantined after several cases among their residents were confirmed. Movement in and out of the villages was banned, allowing only medical staff and municipal staff to supply medication and food. On 18 March, Greece announced new coronavirus restrictions pertaining to migrant camps. For thirty days, the movement of camp residents would be restricted to small groups between 7 am and 7 pm, which could only include one person per family and would be controlled by police on public transport. Specialised medical teams were sent to the camps for the creation of virus isolation areas and compulsory temperature checking. All other visits to the camps whether by individuals or organisations were suspended for at least 14 days. On the same day, Deputy Minister of Civil Protection and Crisis Management Nikos Hardalias announced a ban on public gatherings of 10 or more people and the imposition of a €1,000 fine on violators.

On 20 March, Minister of Shipping and Island Policy Giannis Plakiotakis announced that only permanent residents and supply trucks would be allowed to travel to the Greek islands, with effect from 6 am local time on 21 March. Travellers need to provide proof of permanent residence (via a tax certificate) on the island to which they wish to travel. People who are already on the islands and wish to leave are allowed to return to the mainland.

On 22 March, the Greek government announced a ban on all nonessential transport and movement across the country, starting from 6 a.m. on 23 March until 6 April. Movement was permitted only for a prescribed set of reasons that include moving to or from the workplace during normal business hours, shopping for food or medicine, visiting a doctor or assisting a person in need of help, exercising individually or in pairs or walking a pet, attending a ceremony (wedding, baptism, funeral etc.), and cases of divorced parents moving to ensure communication with their children. People returning to their permanent places of residence were exempt. Citizens leaving their home were required to carry their ID or passport with them, as well as some type of certification explaining the reason for their movement which has to be confirmed by their employer or by themselves. The options included filling in a special form that could be downloaded from the government website forma.gov.gr, sending a free SMS to the number 13033, or explaining their reason in a signed handwritten declaration. The information needed included the name, home address, time of departure from home, and the specific reason for transport that falls under one of the exceptions. Members of the government and parliament as well as all Health, Civil Protection, Law Enforcement and Armed Forces personnel were excluded from the measure. The Hellenic Police, the Municipal Police, the Hellenic Coast Guard and the National Transparency Authority were required to enforce the restrictions and issue fines of 150 euros for each offense. On the same day, it was also announced that daytime public transport services would be limited, although ensuring sufficient service during business hours. Journeys by car were only permitted for specific reasons, and the driver may only have one passenger in the vehicle. Since the beginning of the curfew through 6 April, Greek police have recorded more than 20,000 violations (increasing in recent days) and made 348 arrests of offenders. On 4 April the measure was extended until 27 April.

On 31 March, Deputy Minister for Civil Protection and Crisis Management Nikos Hardalias announced additional restrictive measures for a duration of 14 days in the municipalities of Kastoria, Orestida and Nestorio of Kastoria Regional Unit as well as those of Xanthi and Myki of Xanthi Regional Unit. A night curfew was imposed from 8:00 p.m. until 8:00 a.m. the following morning and some options of the lockdown movement restrictions were suspended. Only close relatives can attend a funeral and pet owners are allowed to walk their pet for up to 15 minutes and near their house only.

On 2 April, following the confirmation of a case in Mykonos, all construction activities on the island were suspended. On 5 April, another case was confirmed and a night curfew was imposed from 8:00 p.m. until 8:00 a.m. the following morning while some options of the lockdown movement restrictions were suspended for 14 days. The same day all construction activity was suspended for 30 days on the island of Santorini, although no cases have been reported there.

From 8 April, the Hellenic Police installed permanent roadblocks and intensified checks of vehicles in all national roads and highways across the country, as well of travellers at the airports, ports, railway and bus stations. Anyone travelling by car without a valid reason to a destination other than his permanent residence was charged with a fine of 300 euros, is obliged to return to his place of origin and the vehicle registration plates are seized for 60 days.

From 17 to 24 August, a cap of 50 attendees applied to most public events. From 21 August to 12 September, a lower cap of 9 persons applied in Halkidiki and Mykonos, in private as well as public spaces. The same restrictions were also imposed in Chania, but from 25 August to 12 September. From 29 August to 12 September the same restrictions applied also to Zakynthos, Lesvos and Imathia.

From 12 October, four risk categories (low / moderate / high / very high risk) were introduced and applied to each regional unit. In the first three risk categories, gatherings of no more than 100 (low risk), 50 (medium risk) or 9 persons (high risk) are allowed, while in regions categorized as 'very high risk' no outdoor gatherings are allowed. When the new system was introduced, 27 regional units were low risk, 25 were medium risk, 22 were high risk and no region was very high risk. On 15 and 16 October respectively, the Kozani and Kastoria regional units were moved from the high to the very high risk category, followed by the Ioannina and Serres regional units on 29 October.

During the second national lockdown from 7 November to 14 December, leaving the house was only allowed for six specific reasons and subject to confirmation by SMS.

From 7 November, the government instituted a traffic ban during night hours. Initially it allowed exceptions which included movement for the purchase of food or medicine. From 13 November, the ban on movement became stricter with an almost complete curfew from 9 pm to 5 am with more limited exceptions.

During the pandemic, 34% of individuals in Thessaloniki stopped utilizing public transportation, and over 70% stated they would prefer more buses on the road to reduce the possibilities of cars being overcrowded.

==== Travel and entry restrictions ====
On 9 March, the Hellenic Civil Aviation Authority announced the temporary suspension of all flights to and from northern Italy, affecting all Greek airports and all airlines. On 14 March the suspension was extended to all passenger flights to and from Italy, excluding cargo and sanitary ones.

On 16 March Greece closed its borders with Albania and North Macedonia, deciding to suspend all road, sea and air links with these countries, while only permitting the transport of goods and the entry of Greek nationals and residents. The suspension of ferry services to and from Italy, air links to Spain, as well as the prohibition of all cruise ships and sailboats docking in Greek ports was also decided. The same day it was announced that a 14-day home restriction will be mandatory for those who enter the country.

On 18 March, Greece and the other EU member states decided to close their external borders to all non-EU nationals. In Greece, the entry of citizens of countries from outside the European Union was only permitted for a condition that relates exclusively to an emergency or family matter. All private pleasure boats from abroad were also banned from entering the country. On 19 March, Turkey closed the land border crossings with Greece at Karaağaç and Ipsala.

From 23 March, Greece suspended all passenger flights to and from the UK as well as all air, sea, rail and road connections with Turkey, with an exception for Greek citizens and those who have residence permits or whose main residence is in Greece, as well as trucks and ships transporting goods.

On 28 March, Greece suspended all commercial flights to and from Germany and the Netherlands until 15 April, with a few exemptions. From Germany, only flights to Athens Eleftherios Venizelos Airport were permitted.

On 15 April, the Hellenic Civil Aviation Authority issued NOTAMs covering until 15 May, that ban commercial flights to and from Italy, Spain, Turkey, the United Kingdom, the Netherlands and Germany. Exemptions included cargo, sanitary, humanitarian, state, military, ferry and Frontex flights, as well as flights in support of the Hellenic National Healthcare System, those for repatriation of Greek citizens and emergency flights.

On 15 May, the Hellenic CAA issued five more NOTAMs extending the suspension of all commercial flights to and from Italy, Spain, Turkey, the United Kingdom and the Netherlands until 1 June, and all flights to and from Albania and North Macedonia and flights from Turkey until 15 June, with the exemptions mentioned above. Moreover, the temporary entry ban to all non-EU citizens was extended until 1 June and all international flights are allowed to land and depart only at Athens Eleftherios Venizelos Airport until that date.

Restrictions on entry for international travellers were lifted in mid-June and entry restrictions on British tourists were set to expire on 15 July. Passengers arriving from countries with high infection rates were required to take a test and agree to a two-week quarantine. Passengers from lower risk countries would be tested at random, but did not face a mandatory quarantine period.

From 5 August, the Kakavia border crossing is closed nightly 23-07hrs and travellers arriving from Albania need to self-isolate for seven days.

From 17 August, airline passengers arriving in Greece from Belgium, Czechia, Spain, the Netherlands or Sweden need to provide evidence of a negative COVID-19 test result from the past 72 hours. The same applies to anyone entering Greece by land. This requirement was lifted on 29 August concerning the Netherlands. From 11 November to 7 January this requirement applied to all international arrivals.

From 9 November to 28 January, domestic air travel was restricted to essential journeys only (for health purposes, business purposes, family reunification or returning to permanent residence).

=== Economic measures ===
On 18 March, in a joint news conference, Finance Minister Christos Staikouras, Labour Minister Yannis Vroutsis, and Development & Investments Minister Adonis Georgiadis announced a package of measures to support the economy, businesses and employees. The measures include the suspension, for four months, of tax and social security obligations of corporations that were ordered to close by the state decree, with the sole condition that they do not dismiss any workers. This measure covers about 220,000 businesses and 600,000 employees. The measures also include an €800 stipend as well as a four-month suspension of payment of March taxes on employees of businesses the activity of which was suspended and on freelance professionals who work in sectors affected by the pandemic. The reduction of VAT tax from 24% to 6% on pharmaceutical products such as gloves, masks and antiseptics was also announced. Moreover, the Finance Minister announced the inclusion of Greece in an emergency assets purchases' program worth €750 billion launched by the European Central Bank, and also stated the 3.5% primary surplus target for Greece is no longer in effect, according to a Eurogroup decision.

On 19 March, Prime Minister Kyriakos Mitsotakis, in a nationally televised address, announced the revision of the State Budget to allocate more than €10 billion in support of the economy. The suspension of tax and social security obligations of corporations and the number of beneficiaries of the €800 stipend was extended to include all businesses harmed by the pandemic, all freelancers and self-employed workers and the majority of private sector workers. The state will also cover the cost of beneficiaries' insurance, pension, and health payments. The PM also stated that the Easter bonus would be paid in full to all employees and announced a special bonus for health and civil protection workers.

According to the International Monetary Fund, as of June 2020 the package of measures in support of the economy, financed from national and EU resources, totals about 14% of Greece's GDP (€24 billion) including loan guarantees. Greece has said it will not accept European Union conditions on how coronavirus emergency aid is used. Mitsotakis said "Greeks have matured a lot. And we want to do our own reforms."

=== Suspension of businesses and workplaces ===
On 12 March, a two-week closure of all theatres, courthouses, cinemas, gyms, playgrounds and clubs was announced.

On 13 March, the nationwide closure of all shopping centres, cafes, restaurants, bars, museums and archaeological sites and food outlets, excluding supermarkets, pharmacies and food outlets that offer take-away and delivery only, was announced. On 14 March, all organised beaches and ski resorts were closed.

On 19 March, the government announced the closure of all hotels across the country, from midnight on 22 March and until the end of April. Only hotels that accommodate personnel that guard the border would continue to operate, as well as three hotels in Athens and Thessaloniki and one hotel per regional unit would remain open. Moreover, all Greek citizens returning from abroad would be subjected to mandatory surveillance and isolation for at least 14 days. On 22 March, all parks, recreation areas and marinas were also closed.

From 17 to 24 August all bars, restaurants, clubs and entertainment venues in Attica, Crete, Eastern Macedonia and Thrace, Thessaloniki, Halkidiki, Larissa, Corfu, Mykonos, Paros and Antiparos, Poros, Santorini, Volos, Katerini, Rhodes, Zakynthos and Kos were subject to nighttime curfew from midnight to 07hrs.

As part of the four risk categories introduced from 12 October, different rules on opening hours, maximum capacity and seating were applied to bars, restaurants and cafés in each regional unit depending on its risk category.

A second nationwide lockdown began on 7 November, lasting until December, along similar lines to that in March: only supermarkets, pharmacies and food takeaway business were allowed to remain open. During the second lockdown supermarkets were not allowed to sell non-essential items such as clothing, shoes, books, electronic equipment and electrical appliances.

=== Closure of educational institutions ===
Starting on 28 February, with four confirmed cases in the country, the precautionary local closure of schools was decided when there was concern that members of these school communities may have come into contact with a coronavirus carrier. On the same day, all educational trips abroad programmed by Greek schools were suspended and various municipalities around the country began disinfecting schools locally. On 4 March, the closure of all public and private educational institutions of all levels in Ilia, Achaea and Zakynthos was decided and from 8 March all educational trips within the country were suspended.

On 10 March, the operation of all schools, universities, daycare centres and all other educational establishments were suspended nationwide for fourteen days. A special purpose leave of 15 days was introduced for working parents. Ten days later, on 20 March, this was extended such that all educational institutions would remain closed until 10 April. On 10 April, the Minister of Education Niki Kerameos announced that all educational institutions would remain closed until 10 May.

Schools reopened on 14 September, subject to fulfilling a list of 16 conditions notably concerning hygiene measures, break times, school trips and activities. However, opposition parties and students' groups criticised the government for the insufficiency of the measures, while many school strikes were initiated across the country.

During the second national lockdown from 7 November, only special education schools remained open. Secondary and tertiary education institutions were closed from 7 November; students were offered distance learning. Kindergartens and primary schools were initially intended to remain open during the lockdown but joined other schools in closing down from 16 November, while schools remained closed at least until 7 January.

=== Penalties for not conforming to isolation rules ===
A person who had tested positive and who failed to isolate could be sentenced to prison for up to five years, this rose if someone else were infected because of the breach to ten years and in the event that the breach led to the death of a third party, up to fifteen years in prison.

=== Refugees and migrants ===
On 27 February, prime minister Mitsotakis announced that illegal entry from Turkey would no longer be tolerated as this would be a threat to public health in Greece. According to various estimates about 150,600 displaced persons were located in Greece. In the existing camps, doctors, NGOs and refugees considered that measures against the spread of the coronavirus were lacking as people lived in overcrowded spaces with little access to proper health services. On 24 March, 21 international human rights organizations active in Greece including Amnesty International, the Human Rights Watch and ActionAid published an open call to the Greek government to take immediate measures to prevent the spread of COVID-19 in the Reception and Identification Centres, where refugees lived. The conditions of the centres were criticised as deplorable and dangerous to both the refugees and public health. Médecins Sans Frontières, which had a clinic near the Moria camp, declared that the numbers in the camps had reached levels such that they could not handle an outbreak of infection within the camp. The government further announced that movement of refugees outside the camps would be restricted as facilities were prepared for confirmed cases, and that it would only allow small groups of refugees and migrants to temporarily exit the camps to obtain basic supplies.

On 31 March, it was reported that two individuals were infected in the Ritsona refugee camp in Central Greece. On 14 August, two camps in Evros and Drama were put into quarantine until the end of August.

In September 2020 it was announced that half of the COVID-19 admissions for one day in two hospitals in Athens had been immigrants.

"Faced with increased isolation and health risk in camps, many refugees organised protests to improve living conditions in state-run camps at the beginning of the pandemic. Many fled the camps illegally. But many who stayed trapped inside the camps during the lockdown initiated a range of novel practices of self- and community care".

=== Animal welfare ===
According to an Al Jazeera report on 30 April 2020, animal rescue groups and shelters throughout Greece have been overwhelmed with thousands of stray dogs due to the disruption of international dog adoption caused by international travel restrictions imposed in response to the COVID-19 pandemic.

=== Donations ===
The Hellenic Ministry of Health has formed a 3-member committee responsible for the review and employment of all the donations in support of the National Healthcare System during the COVID-19 pandemic. On 7 May, Health Minister Vasilis Kikilias announced that donations worth about €90 million came from organisations, companies and individuals, as well as other states such as the United Arab Emirates and China. Forty million euros were for medical equipment (ICU monitors, ventilators, ICU beds), another 24.2 million euros were for personal protective equipment (face masks, surgical aprons, protective uniforms, medical overshoes) and there were another €12.5 million in cash deposits.

== Lifting of emergency measures ==
On 28 April, Greek Prime Minister Kyriakos Mitsotakis and six Deputy Ministers, as well as four Ministers in the following days, announced the government's plan for the gradual lifting of the restrictive measures and the restart of business activity. The plan consisted of specific milestone dates and extended throughout May and June 2020. It had been evaluated continuously against the COVID-19 infection rate over the following weeks and revised based on the progression of the pandemic in the country.

=== Initial stage on 4 May ===
Starting on 4 May, those moving outside their home no longer needed to send a text message or carry a declaration stating their reason, but only within the regional unit where they lived. In its 42 days of operation, from 23 March to 4 May, a total of about 110 million text messages to the number 13033 were handled, an average of 1,818 messages per minute. Travel to other regional units or between islands within the same regional unit remained prohibited until 18 May.

Some stores opened on 4 May, however some were by appointment only and strict rules regarding the maximum number of people inside applied. The stores opening were hairdressers, bookstores, electrical appliance stores, optical and sports equipment stores, as well as vehicle inspection centres (KTEO). This restart affected a total of 26,167 businesses, about 10% of those whose operation was suspended, and 68,528 employees, also about 10% of the total.

The use of face masks was mandatory for employees and customers in some closed places, such as supermarkets, hospitals, pharmacies, clinics and elevators, as well as in public transport. The government recommended the use of private vehicles rather than public transport to reduce congestion. Public transport increased schedules to accommodate passengers without crowding during peak hours.

Public sector employees attended their jobs in three stages, at 07:00, 08:00 and 09:00 in the morning in order to avoid congestion on public transport, and the special-purpose leave for parents with school-age children was extended until the end of May.

Scheduled surgeries resumed from 4 May, individual exercise was allowed in open areas and churches opened, but only for individual prayer.

=== 11 and 18 May ===
On 11 May, all remaining retail shops as well as driving schools that were shut down by governmental decree, except shopping malls, cafes and restaurants, re-opened with specific hygiene rules. This restart affected a total of 66,010 businesses, about 25% of those whose operation was suspended, and 155,962 employees, 22.5% of the total.

Classes for High school senior grade students resumed from 11 May, but classes were divided into two groups with a maximum of 15 pupils in each group. Groups attended classes on alternating days. Worshippers were able to attend Divine Liturgies and other religious services following specific hygiene rules, from 17 May.

From 18 May, all other grades of secondary education resumed classes and private tuition and foreign language centres re-opened. On that date, all movement restrictions across the country were also lifted with the restart of free travel between regions on the mainland and the islands of Crete and Euboea. Travel by bus, train or plane includes a series of hygiene measures such as pre-boarding screening measures, limits to the maximum number of people allowed to board, mandatory use of face masks, keeping a safety distance and regular cleaning and disinfection. On 18 May all archaeological sites, zoos, botanical gardens as well as all aesthetic and dietary institutes, discount and outlet villages and shopping malls re-opened, earlier than the previously established 1 June date. Mall customers and employees are required to keep safe distances and wear masks.

=== Subsequent stages (25 May - June) ===
On 25 May, a week earlier than the initial planning, all cafes and restaurants re-opened for business, but only with outdoor seating, certain distances between chairs and tables and a maximum of six seated customers per table. The use of face masks and gloves by staff members was compulsory.

On 1 June, year-round hotels, open-air cinemas, golf courses and public swimming pools began operation. Nursery schools, kindergartens and primary schools also opened on 1 June, although their operation had not been initially decided. On 5 June, the Super League Greece resumed play, but without fans in the stadiums. Indoor restaurants and cafes as well as other indoor facilities gradually opened on 6 June.

== Vaccination campaign ==
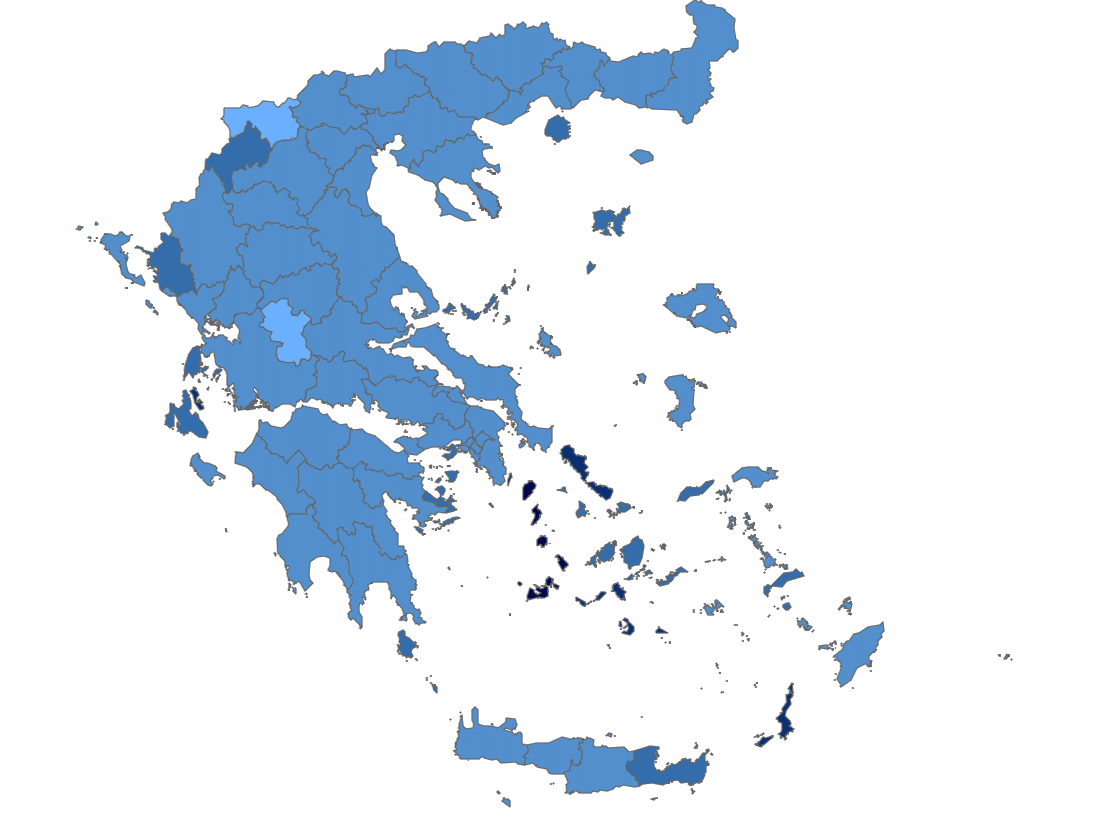
Vaccination coverage rate as per 2 June 2021.

The COVID-19 vaccination campaign began on 27 December 2020.

== Controversies and criticism ==
=== Religious services and Holy Communion controversy ===
On 9 March 2020, the Standing Holy Synod of the Church of Greece, the country's established Eastern Orthodox Church, discussed the coronavirus epidemic and issued an encyclical that was sent to the dioceses of the Church of Greece. Having stated that the Holy Communion could by no means be a way of transmission of diseases, the Standing Synod decided to continue offering and receiving the Holy Communion. The Synod's decision sparked controversy. The Synod's stance prompted criticism from the opposition Syriza party, with former prime minister Alexis Tsipras criticising the hierarchy, as did former health minister Pavlos Polakis. Some high-profile Greek medical doctors publicly supported the continuation of practicing Holy Communion, drawing criticism from the Greek Association of Hospital Doctors.

On 11 March, the prime minister of Greece Kyriakos Mitsotakis, in a nationally televised address, told the public to follow the instructions of doctors and experts, and the Church of Greece to cooperate in enforcing the public health regulations. Two days later, the Archbishop of Athens and all Greece Ieronymos stated that the Church agreed with and would implement the public health precautionary measures taken by the national authorities.

On 16 March, after having been briefed by infectious disease spokesman Sotiris Tsiodras, the Church's Standing Synod decided to suspend all public services except Divine Liturgies on Sundays, which were to be held as usual between 7 and 8 o'clock in the morning; weddings and baptisms were suspended, funerals were to be held with only the immediate family present; churches were to remain open for private prayer. Following the Synod's decision, the Greek prime minister announced the government's decision to suspend services in all areas of religious worship of any religion or dogma from 16 to 30 March, effectively suspending Sunday Divine Liturgies for that period too.

On 1 April, the Standing Synod of the Church of Greece issued a statement that urged the faithful to abide by the government's sanitary regulations and to refrain from attending services in churches; it also re-affirmed its stance on the Holy Communion set out in the statement of 9 March 2020 and expressed hope that solemn public celebration of Easter (Pascha), which would properly be on 19 April, could be performed on the night of 26 May, the eve of the Leave-Taking (Apodosis) of Pascha.

On 18 April, some churches in Athens were opened by the priests to offer services to worshippers. Elsewhere in Athens, some Orthodox believers protested against the closing of the churches and hammered on the church doors. 18 of them were arrested by the police. In the island of Corfu, the local Orthodox bishop, who had opposed government measures to halt the spread of coronavirus, invited the local mayor and citizens to take part in a closed-door service.

As part of the four risk categories introduced from 12 October, different rules on seating and distancing between worshippers were applied to places of worship in each regional unit depending on its risk category. As of November 2020, the Orthodox church practice of believers receiving wine from the same spoon during Holy Communion, has not changed.

=== Ban on 17 November 'Polytechnic' March ===
On 14 November, the Greek Chief of Police, announced a ban on gatherings of more than three people throughout the country, from 15 November until 18 November. In Greece, 17 November ordinarily commemorates the Polytechnic uprising of November 1973. On 15 November 2020 the Association of Judges and Prosecutors of Greece said that such a general ban on gatherings was unconstitutional as it conflicts with article 11 of the Greek Constitution and asked that it be revoked. Their statement did not oppose more specific bans and continued "The State must protect public health in the face of a pandemic, without exceeding the limits of the rule of law". Left-wing opposition parties SYRIZA, Communist Party of Greece and MERA25 condemned the police order as unconstitutional, authoritarian and undemocratic and demanded its withdrawal. The Communist Party of Greece invited MPs and its members to participate in the march, contrary to the police ban, while MERA25 advised their members to stay home due to the pandemic and let the party's MP's represent them in the march. The Secretary of MERA25, Giannis Varoufakis, announced that he had a telephone conversation with the Minister of Civil Protection, Michalis Chrysochoidis, who announced that any members of the Greek Parliament participating in the march on the anniversary of the Polytechnic Uprising would be arrested.

=== Delays in drug approvals ===
According to complaints from the former Deputy Minister of Health and surgeon-intensivist, Pavlos Polakis and the president of the far-right Greek Solution party, Kyriakos Velopoulos, the Greek government delayed approving potentially important drugs against COVID-19 such as Colchicine and the use of Monoclonal antibodies. According to the complaints, although the effective use of Colchicine was discovered by Greek scientists, the Greek government approved the drug in January 2021 with a delay of 5 months, while until February 2021 it had not approved the use of Monoclonal Antibodies.

=== Control of the media and claims of censorship ===
Since its election in July 2019, the government of Kyriakos Mitsotakis has been criticised by the opposition for its privileged relations with the media, such as democratic backsliding. During the first phase of the epidemic, the government allocated a total of 20 million euros for a state advertising campaign on TV channels, newspapers and news websites to promote the quarantine that had been imposed. The spending was criticised by the opposition in the parliament that mentioned also the exclusion of media outlets which were not supportive of the government ("Petsas list"). On 30 November 2020, the Vice President of the European Commission Věra Jourová stated that same phenomena, regarding the funding of government-friendly media, are also observed in Hungary, Slovenia and Poland.

In addition, there were complaints that the Greek government tried to silence critical views from journalists regarding the strictness of the quarantine. A typical example is the non-broadcasting of a scheduled and videotaped journalistic TV show presented by Antonis Schroeter on the ALPHA TV station on 29 October 2020. The show was about the so-called conspiracy theories about COVID-19. The show hosted the views of Nikolaos Sypsas, a professor of infectious diseases, member of the committee of the Greek Ministry of Health and advocate of extreme and harsh restrictive measures, and from the other hand the professor of pediatrics Ioannis Kavaliotis and the musician Grigoris Petrakos who were against the measures of the Greek Government. The Greek Government also prosecuted internet and social network users who published dissenting views regarding government measures against COVID-19. Specifically, the Cybercrime Prosecution of the Greek Police monitored conversations and posts on Facebook, Instagram, Twitter and other social networks in order to identify people who refused to comply with government measures. The prosecutor of the Supreme Court requested that prosecutors throughout the country prosecute such people, and those who were detected would face immediate arrest and a maximum imprisonment of three years if convicted. 44 cases had already been filed by 24 September 2020.

=== Proposal for a European vaccination certificate ===
The Greek Prime Minister Kyriakos Mitsotakis sent a letter to the President of the European Commission Ursula von der Leyen on 11 January 2021, asking her to apply a pan-European vaccination certificate for COVID-19 so that Europeans could travel. The World Health Organization expressed its opposition to such a possibility, as there was a shortage of vaccines worldwide and the effectiveness of vaccines had not yet been established. The first negative reaction from leaders of European Union countries to the Mitsotakis proposal came from the Romanian President Klaus Iohannis, who characterized the Mitsotakis proposal as divisive, stating that a vaccination certificate could not be related to travel and that such a certificate would divide the citizens of Europe. France expressed reservations about Mitsotakis' proposal, with France's Minister for European Affairs stating that France was very cautious about the certificate and that the proposal was too early.

== See also ==
- COVID-19 pandemic by country
- COVID-19 pandemic in Europe
