= Gikas (given name) =

Gikas, sometimes also spelled Gkikas or Ghikas (Greek: Γκίκας), is a Greek given name. Notable people with the name include:

- Gkikas Magiorkinis (born 1978), Greek medical doctor
- Gikas Hardouvelis (born 1955), Greek politician

== See also ==
- Gikas (surname)
