= Tsiodras =

Tsiodras is a surname of Greek origin.

== People with the surname ==
- Dimitris Tsiodras (born 1959), Greek politician
- Sotiris Tsiodras, Australia-born Greek pathologist physician

== See also ==
- Tsipras
