= Gikas (surname) =

Gikas, also spelled Gkikas or Ghikas (Greek: Γκίκας), is a Greek surname. Notable people with the surname include:

- Christos Gikas (born 1976), Greek Greco-Roman wrestler
- Konstantinos Gikas (1913–1980), Greek footballer
- Nikos Gkikas (born 1990), Greek basketball player
- Nikos Hadjikyriakos-Ghikas (1906–1994), Greek painter
- Solon Gikas (1898–1978), Greek Army officer

== See also ==
- Ghica family
- Gikas (given name)
