= Gkikas Magiorkinis =

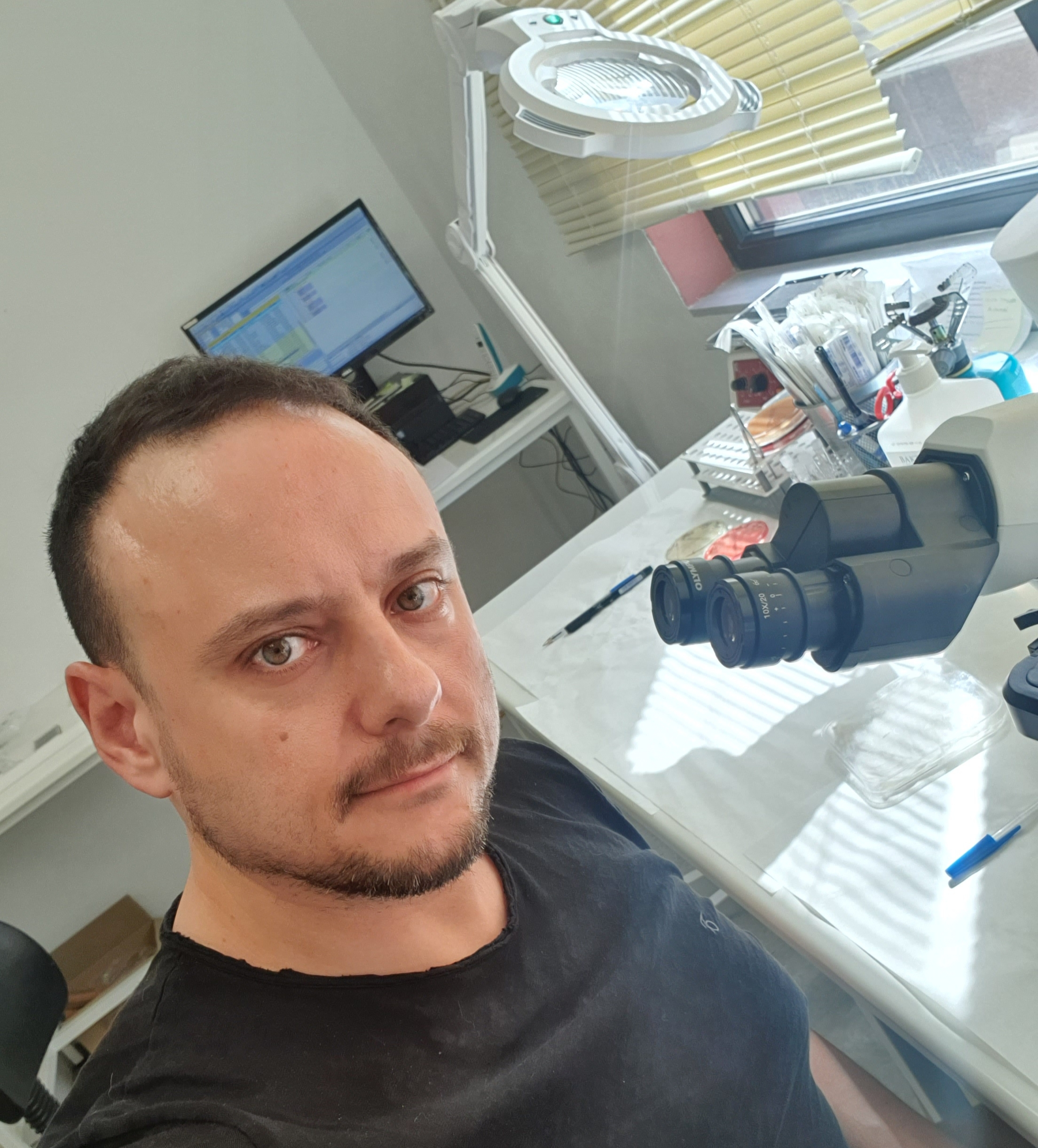
Gkikas Magiorkinis

Gkikas Magiorkinis (1978) is a Greek medical doctor specialized in Clinical Pathology and Associate Professor of Hygiene and Epidemiology at the Department of Hygiene, Epidemiology and Medical Statistics of the National and Kapodistrian University of Athens in Athens, Greece.

== Early years ==
Gkikas Magiorkinis was born and raised in Piraeus and was an honors student at school, while receiving awards in the Hellenic National Contests of Physics (2nd award, 1997) and Chemistry (5th award, 1997). He was accepted at the Medical School of Athens University in 1997, having scored the highest marks in all of Greece in the Greek University Admission Exams.

== Education ==
Magiorkinis graduated from Medical School in 2004 and then earned a Master of Science degree in Biostatistics. He carried out his PhD at the School of Medicine of Athens University and his thesis was titled “Molecular evolution of Human Viruses – applications on molecular epidemiology". His medical training was completed with residencies in biopathology at three Athens hospitals, namely "Andreas Syngros", "Laiko" and "401 Army General Hospital".

== Career ==
From 2010 to 2017 he was postdoctoral researcher (2010-2011), Marie-Curie Fellow (2011-2012), Medical Research Council Clinician Scientist Fellow (2013-2017) and University Research Lecturer (2014-2017) at Oxford University, while from 2013 to 2017 he served as Honorary Consultant in Medical Virology at the Virus Reference Department of Public Health England in Colindale, London. He then became a lecturer and subsequently assistant professor of Hygiene and Epidemiology in the Department of Hygiene, Epidemiology and Medical Statistics of the National and Kapodistrian University of Athens. Since 2020 he has served on the Ministry of Health's Committee of Experts on Public Health and he substitutes for professor Sotirios Tsiodras in the public briefings on the COVID-19 pandemic when Dr. Tsiodras is absent.

== Distinctions ==
=== Awards ===
- 2012: "Marie Curie" Award in the category "Promising Research Talent"
- 2011: "Ioannis Vlysidis" award, Athens Academy

=== Fellowships ===
Dr. Magiorkinis has been awarded several fellowships, the most important of which are:

- Clinician Scientist Fellowship, Medical Research Council, United Kingdom
- Junior Research Fellow, St. Cross College, University of Oxford
- Marie Curie Intra-European Fellowship, European Commission

He is a member of the UK General Medical Council, the Medical Association of Athens, a fellow of the Royal College of Pathologists and the Royal Society of Medicine. Dr. Magiorkinis has over 60 publications in peer-reviewed journals, indicatively The New England Journal of Medicine and Lancet Infectious Diseases. International media have often featured Dr. Magiorkinis, indicatively The Washington Post, The Guardian, Euronews and others.

== Scientific views ==
=== Reducing SARS-CoV-2 transmission at schools ===
In a post on his Facebook page on Saturday 29 August 2020, Dr. Magiorkinis used a diagram to explain why mathematical models were estimating that a school classroom of 25 pupils is only 4% more of a hazard for the dispersion of SARS-CoV-2 than a classroom of 15 pupils. Moreover, he explained that mathematical models take into account that the solution involving smaller classes is likely to pose a greater risk for educators, as it would mean nearly double exposure to possible infected cases. His opinion was widely questioned by educators, while at the same time contrasting opinions were being expressed by non experts in infectious disease epidemiology biomedical scientists such as retired Professor of Chronic Disease in Work Environment Dr. Athina Linou and Professor of Genetics at Geneva University Dr. Manolis Dermitzakis. Dr. Dermitzakis explained his disagreement by replying to Dr. Magiorkinis that the model he used was wrong, as in a class of 25 pupils there is a higher probability of a child being SARS-CoV-2-positive, and additionally the child will potentially spread the virus to more individuals than in a 15-pupil class. Dr Magiorkinis position is based on mathematical models of the New York University, cited by ECDC, which estimated that in order to achieve 40% reduction in transmission within classrooms through reduction of the pupils' density, pupils should be split into three groups that will be attending every three days which was practically non feasible.
