= Solon Gikas =

Greek Army officer (c. 1898–c. 1978)

- Σόλων Γκίκας
- Born: c. 1898; Trikala, Kingdom of Greece
- Died: c. 1978
- Education: Hellenic Military Academy
- Military career
- Allegiance: Kingdom of Greece
- Branch: Hellenic Army
- Service years: 1915–1956
- Rank: Lieutenant General
- Commands: 42nd Infantry Brigade; 7th Infantry Division; 8th Infantry Division; III Army Corps; Chief of the Hellenic Army General Staff
- Wars: World War I: Macedonian front; Greco-Turkish War (1919–22); World War II: Greco-Italian War; Battle of Greece; Greek Civil War: Dekemvriana
- Awards: Cross of Valour in Gold (twice)
- Other work: Minister for Communications and Public Works; Minister for Public Order

Solon Gikas (Greek: Σόλων Γκίκας, 1898–1978) was a Greek Army officer who rose to the rank of Lieutenant General and held the post of Chief of the Hellenic Army General Staff in 1954–1956. He also served as Minister for Communications and Public Works in 1958–63 and Minister for Public Order in 1974–76 under Konstantinos Karamanlis.

== Life ==
He was born in Trikala in western Thessaly in 1898. He entered the Hellenic Army Academy and graduated on 28 June 1918 as a Cavalry 2nd Lieutenant. He fought in the last months of World War I in the Macedonian front, and then participated in the Greco-Turkish War of 1919–22, fighting both in Thrace as well as in Asia Minor, and being promoted to Lieutenant in 1920.

A French-speaker, during the interwar period he completed his studies at the Hellenic Army's Cavalry Application School and the French Army's Cavalry School at Saumur, as well as graduating from the Superior War School, in which he later taught. He was promoted to Captain in 1924, Major in 1935, and Lt. Colonel in 1940. During the Greco-Italian War of 1940–41, he served as the chief of staff of the Hellenic Army's sole Cavalry Division. Following the German invasion of Greece and the country's occupation, in 1943 he fled to the Middle East, where he joined the armed forces of the Greek government-in-exile. He held various staff positions, as well as the post of Commander of the Training Schools in Palestine.

Following liberation, he fought in the Dekemvriana against the forces of EAM-ELAS. Promoted to Colonel in 1946, he was sent to the United States as military attache until 1948. Returning to Greece he was promoted Brigadier General and participated in the operations of the last year of the Greek Civil War (1948–49) first as commander of the 42nd Infantry Brigade, then as deputy commander of the 2nd Infantry Division, and as commander of a special mixed detachment. A Major General since 1950, he successively commanded the 7th Infantry Division and the 8th Infantry Division. Promoted to Lt. General in 1952, he served as Deputy Chief of the Hellenic Army General Staff, commander of III Army Corps, and finally as Chief of the Hellenic Army General Staff from 1 December 1954 until 30 June 1956. He retired on 10 July 1956.

After his retirement he engaged in politics with the conservative National Radical Union of Konstantinos Karamanlis. He was elected MP for Athens several times, and served in Karamanlis' cabinets as Minister for Communications and Public Works from 17 May 1958 until 20 September 1961, and in 4–17 November 1961, and as Minister for Public Works from then until 19 June 1963.

Following the fall of the Regime of the Colonels, Gikas served yet again under Karamanlis as Minister for Public Order in the first post-junta civilian cabinet sworn in on 24 July 1974, and in the cabinet formed after the November 1974 election by Karamanlis' new party, New Democracy, until 5 January 1976.

Gikas died in 1978.

Political offices
Preceded by Dimosthenis Pippas	Minister for Communications and Public Works of Greece; 17 May 1958 – 20 September 1961	Succeeded by Dimosthenis Pippas
Preceded by Dimosthenis Pippas	Minister for Communications and Public Works of Greece; 4–11 November 1961	Succeeded by himself as Minister for Public Works
Preceded by Dimosthenis Pippas	Minister for Communications and Public Works of Greece; 4–11 November 1961	Succeeded by Dimitrios Vranopoulos as Minister for Communications
Preceded by himself as Minister for Communications and Public Works	Minister for Public Works of Greece; 11 November 1961 – 19 June 1963	Succeeded by Georgios Markakis
Preceded by Georgios Tsoumanis	Minister for Public Order of Greece; 24 July 1974 – 5 January 1976	Succeeded by Georgios Stamatis
Military offices
Preceded by Lt General Alexandros Tsingounis	Chief of the Hellenic Army General Staff; 1 December 1954 – 30 June 1956	Succeeded by Lt General Petros Nikolopoulos
