= COVID-19 vaccination in Greece =

Plan to immunize against COVID-19

- Native name: Εθνική Εκστρατεία Εμβολιασμού «Επιχείρηση Ελευθερία»
- Date: 27 December 2020 – present
- Location: Greece
- Cause: COVID-19 pandemic in Greece
- Target: Full immunisation of people in Greece against COVID-19
- Participants: 21.091.153 doses administered (30 June 2022); 7.919.254 have received at least one vaccine dose (30 June 2022) 75.4% 7.629.060 have received both vaccine doses (30 June 2022) 72.6% 6.119.231 have received a booster shot (30 June 2022) 58.2%
- Website: Official Website

The COVID-19 vaccination campaign in Greece began on 27 December 2020. As of the 30th of June 2022, 7.919.254 people have received their first dose (75.4% of total population), and 7.629.060 people have been fully vaccinated (72.6% of total population). A total of 6.119.231 people have received an additional booster shot (58.2% of total population).

== Vaccines on order ==
There are several COVID-19 vaccines at various stages of development around the world.

Vaccine	Approval	Deployment
Pfizer–BioNTech	21 December 2020	27 December 2020
Moderna	6 January 2021	12 January 2021
Oxford-AstraZeneca	29 January 2021	7 February 2021
Janssen	11 March 2021	5 May 2021
Novavax	20 December 2021	5 March 2022
