= Dimitrios Vranopoulos =

Greek lawyer and politician

Dimitrios Vranopoulos (Δημήτριος Βρανόπουλος 1900–1980) was a Greek lawyer and politician who served as director of various area arms of the Municipal Police, as well as in Parliament and as government minister.

== Biography ==
He was born in Athens in 1900. After completing his legal studies at the University of Athens, he started practicing law in Athens and later joined the newly formed Municipal Police. From 1943 to 1945 he served as director of the Municipal Police of Patras. From 1945 to 1950 he was director of the Municipal Police of Piraeus, and subsequently from 1950 to 1956 director of the Municipal Police of Athens. After leaving the police force, he was elected municipal councilor of Athens and president of the Municipal Council.

He was elected five times as a member of parliament for Athens with the National Radical Union party: in 1956, 1958, 1961, 1963 and 1964. In the government of Konstantinos Karamanlis in 1961, he served as Deputy Minister of Transport and Public Works, and later as Minister of Public Works, a position he held until 1963. During his ministry, public address systems were installed on buses as well as electric stop bells, which until then had been operated by the conductor and passengers verbally calling out stops.

In 1969 he was awarded by Yad Vashem the title of Righteous Among the Nations for his contribution to saving Jews during the Occupation.

He died at the age of 80 on February 19, 1980, and was buried the following day at the First Cemetery of Athens. He was survived by his wife Litsa, and children Michalis and Nana.
