= Dragasia =

Dragasia Δραγασιά
- Community
- Location within Greece
- Coordinates: 40°19′37″N 21°08′28″E
- Country: Greece
- Administrative region: Western Macedonia
- Regional unit: Kozani
- Municipality: Voio
- Municipal unit: Tsotyli

Population (2021)
  - Community: 40
- Time zone: UTC+2 (EET)
  - Summer (DST): UTC+3 (EEST)

Dragasia (Greek: Δραγασιά, before 1927: Δίσλαπον – Dislapon), is a small town located in the municipal unit of Tsotyli, western Kozani regional unit, itself in the Greek region of Macedonia.

In the Late Ottoman period, it was inhabited by Vallahades; in the 1900 statistics of Vasil Kanchov, where the town appears under its Bulgarian name "Lislap'", it was inhabited by some 100 people all marked as "Greek Muslims".

Dislapon was a mixed village and a part of its population were Greek speaking Muslim Vallahades. The 1920 Greek census recorded 414 people in the village, and 70 inhabitants (15 families) were Muslim in 1923. Following the Greek–Turkish population exchange, Greek refugee families in Dislapon were from East Thrace (1) and Pontus (20) in 1926. The 1928 Greek census recorded 315 village inhabitants. In 1928, the refugee families numbered 21 (88 people). The village mosque was destroyed.
