= Sotiris Tsiodras =

Australia-born Greek pathologist physician

Doctor Sotiris Tsiodras

Leader of team charged with managing the Coronavirus (COVID-19) pandemic in Greece Government liaison officer on coronavirus pandemic

Personal details
- Born: 13 October 1965 (age 60) Sydney, Australia
- Spouse: Mina
- Children: 7
- Education: University of Athens
- Profession: Physician; internist; infectious disease specialist

Sotiris Tsiodras (Greek: Σωτήρης Τσιόδρας; born 13 October 1965) is a Greek internal medicine physician, specializing in infectiology (infectious diseases), in charge of Greece's management of the coronavirus SARS-CoV-2 crisis.

== Early years and education ==
Tsiodras was born on 13 October 1965 in Sydney, Australia, into an immigrant family originating from Neohori, Argolis. After the family moved back to Greece, he enrolled into the Ioannina medical school and then transferred to the University of Athens from which he graduated in March 1991 as a pathologist.

== Medical career ==
In 1993, Tsiodras was assigned to the 401 General Military Hospital of Athens where he served for one year. During the years 1994–1997, he worked as an internal medicine specialist specializing in Internal Medicine at the Einstein Medical Center Philadelphia in the United States. From 1997 to 2001, he enrolled in the programs for infectious diseases at Beth Israel Deaconess Medical Center and Harvard Medical School. Between 1998 and 2001, he worked as a research fellow at Harvard Medical School from which he received a Medical Sciences M.A in June 2001.

In 2003, he defended cum laude his doctoral dissertation at the Medical School of the National and Kapodistrian University of Athens.

== COVID-19 pandemic in Greece ==
In 2020, the government appointed a group of experts to coordinate the country's management of the SARS-CoV-2 pandemic in Greece. Tsiodras was appointed as the team's leader as well as the government's communications liaison for the COVID-19 health crisis. In December 2021, a study on the management of the fight against the disease in Greece, co-written by Tsiodras and Theodore Lytras, assistant professor of public health at the European University Cyprus, was published in the Scandinavian Journal of Public Health. The study, conducted between September 2020 and May 2021, examined in-hospital mortality of intubated COVID-19 patients, in relation to total intubated patient load, intensive care unit availability, and hospital region. It found that mortality increased by 25% when ICU occupancy exceeded 400 patients, rising progressively to 57% when is went over 800 patients. It also found that "quality of care under increasing patient loads has received less attention" and pointed out "the need for more substantial strengthening of healthcare services, focusing on equity and quality of care besides just expanding capacity." Tsiodras released a statement decrying political exploitation of the publication.

== Accusations and threats ==
During the swine flu epidemic that hit Greece in 2009, as well as Europe, various Greek social media and publications claimed that Tsiodras had been somehow involved in what were ostensibly "excessive" purchases of vaccines for the H1N1 virus, claims that resurfaced during the covid pandemic.

They were proved to be without merit since the chair person of the 2009 epidemic committee was another professor, while Tsiodras had been appointed as a rapporteur of the Hellenic Centre for Disease Control and Prevention. The procurement of the vaccines had been a government decision taken by the General Secretary of the Ministry of Health under by Minister of Health Dimitris Avramopoulos and Prime Minister Costas Karamanlis. Tsiodras himself, who was at the time professor of Pathology and Infections at the Athens University, had publicly opined that "only in the case of a flu pandemic in Greece could the remaining quantities of the vaccines be used, an event that, for now, is only hypothetical." Avramopoulos was eventually investigated for having been "bribed" by pharmaceutical Novartis to proceed with the "excessive quantity" of the swine flu vaccine but the prosecution authority declared, in February 2022, the case as being without merit and containing no evidence for a court trial.

During the COVID-19 pandemic in Greece, several scientists received death threats and were the target of fake news.

== Media coverage ==
Le Figaro claimed that Tsiodras was the "new 'main man' of Greeks". In the article, it is claimed that Tsiodras had asked Prime Minister Kyriakos Mitsotakis to impose strict lockdown measures as soon as the first cases were reported in Italy. Greek sociologist Andreas Drymiotis remarked that "Greeks particularly appreciate [Tsiodras'] calm, his knowledge on the matter, and his deep respect for all victims and the fact that he has an unbreakable dedication to nursing staff."

New York Times journalist Matina Stevis-Gridneff described him as one of the "heroes of the coronavirus era". In May 2020, Frankfurter Allgemeine Zeitung reported that, to Tsiodras, it is "important that nobody is forgotten in a crisis." After many residents of a Roma settlement in Thessaly tested positive for the virus, Tsiodras traveled to the settlement and ordered that the people be supported with food and disinfectants, warning against attempts to "scapegoat" the Roma.

== Personal life ==
Tsiodras is a practicing Orthodox Christian, an aficionado of Byzantine hymnology, and a member of his local church's choir. He and his wife Asimina, née Ghéli, have seven children.

== See also ==
- Greek government, post-2019 elections
- SARS
- World Health Organization
