= Municipal Police (Greece) =

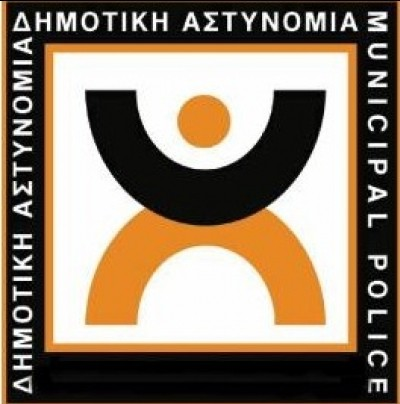
Logo of the Municipal Police in Greece.

The Municipal Police (Greek: Δημοτική Αστυνομία, romanized: Dimotikí Astynomía, lit. 'Demotic Police') is responsible for the supervision of public places of the city, ensuring the functionality and the general security of citizens.

The functions and mode of operation, staffing and activity of the Municipal Police defined by Law 3731/2008

== Responsibilities of the Municipal Police ==
According to Law 3731/2008, as functions of the Municipal Police shall be construed as follows:

1. Verify compliance with the provisions relating to water supply, irrigation and drainage, as contained in the relevant legislation, local regulatory decisions issued by the municipal authorities and the decisions of the boards of municipal water and sewerage companies.
2. Verify compliance with the conditions laid down in legislation and local normal decisions issued by municipal authorities for the use of woods and gardens, squares, playgrounds and other public spaces.
3. It checks that the conditions laid down in the applicable legislation and local regulatory decisions issued by the municipal authorities, for the use and operation of the municipal markets, exhibitions, the zoo- fairs, Christmas markets and general outdoor activities
4. Checks on compliance with the provisions relating to the open-air market and street markets
5. Verify compliance with the provisions relating to outdoor advertising, as well as monitoring compliance specific construction standards and conditions placing banners, which may have been set by local regulatory decisions by the municipal authorities.
6. Controls the observance of cleanliness in public outdoor areas of the territorial district of the municipality and generally following the rules laid down by legislation and local regulatory decisions issued by the municipal authorities to upgrade the aesthetics of cities and settlements
7. Verify compliance with the measures on fire prevention in public outdoor spaces
8. Verify compliance with the provisions relating to the movement of pedestrians, stopping and parking of vehicles, the imposition of administrative measures under Article 103 of n.2696 / 1999, as amended, for the illegal parking of vehicles and the implementation of the provisions, mentioned circulating wheeled pedestrianized streets, squares, pavements and generally in places not intended for such use and noise emission from them. These powers are exercised in parallel and on a case by the Hellenic Police and the Hellenic Coast Guard, as appropriate.
9. Verify compliance with the provisions relating to the regulation of traffic on the hints and signals traffic police In their municipal roads and sections of the national and provincial network passing through residential areas. That power is still exercised in parallel and on a case from the Greek Police (Police) and the Coast Guard. When in the course of the deal with the Municipal Police and the Greek Police or the Coast Guard, at the same time, coordination is the Greek Police or the Coast Guard as appropriate.
10. Verify compliance with the provisions relating to abandoned vehicles.
11. Verify compliance with the provisions relating to the marking of work performed in the streets and obligations of those who execute projects and deposit materials and tools in the municipal road network and controls for taking safety measures and hygiene tasks performed.
12. Checks for compliance with the provisions relating to the operation of playgrounds
13. Checks for compliance with the provisions relating to store operation, businesses, theaters, cinemas, entertainment and other activities for which responsible for granting, revoking and removing establishment licenses, installation, operation and the exercise is concerned Municipality, except those cases for which they are appointed other competent authorities for the relevant inspection.
14. Verify compliance with the provisions on noise pollution, public tranquility and function of music in shops and public centers.
15. Performs administrative penalties relating to the operation of shops and businesses, including the establishment and operation license granted by the municipal authorities.
16. Monitor compliance with provisions regarding spacesfor temporary installation of migrant populations .
17. Monitor the implementation of measures taken by the municipal authorities for activities and situations that present a risk to life and property of residents and especially hazardous buildings, and the implementation of regulatory acts posed by them to protect the health of residents from disturbing activities specified therein.
18. Verify compliance with the relevant provisions for the General Building Regulations.
19. Removes building permit for outstanding social security contributions to IKA
20. Verify compliance with the measures for the protection of museums, monuments, caves, archaeological and historical sites of the municipality area and these facilities taken by the relevant municipal authorities.
21. Participates in the implementation of civil protection plans
22. Controls business of tourist interest concerning the implementation of the tourism legislation (certificate infringements of administrative sanctions, visa lists of rooms and the hotel and accommodation ) in case they operate in provinces or islands where there are not established services of the Greek National Tourism Organization (EOT) .
23. Verify compliance with the provisions on the opening hours of leisure centers and related stores as well as shops and food stores .
24. Monitor compliance with the provisions regarding pets
25. Verify compliance with the provisions relating to each type of regulatory decisions issued by the municipal authorities and the imposition of any kind of administrative measures envisaged by them .
26. Protects the municipal property
27. Conduct an autopsy to verify the conditions required for the issue of administrative acts of the organs of the municipality and, in particular, shall perform an autopsy and a report on the issue of protocol of administrative eviction and for the issue of a residence.
28. It must provide the documents of all kinds of other appropriate Municipal Authorities within the limits of that municipality.

The Greek Police provides assistance to the staff of the Municipal Police in the performance of its work and in particular to scheduled inspections of the Municipal Police or emergency seizures, which provides it .

== See also ==
- Municipal police
