= Varbitsa (river) =

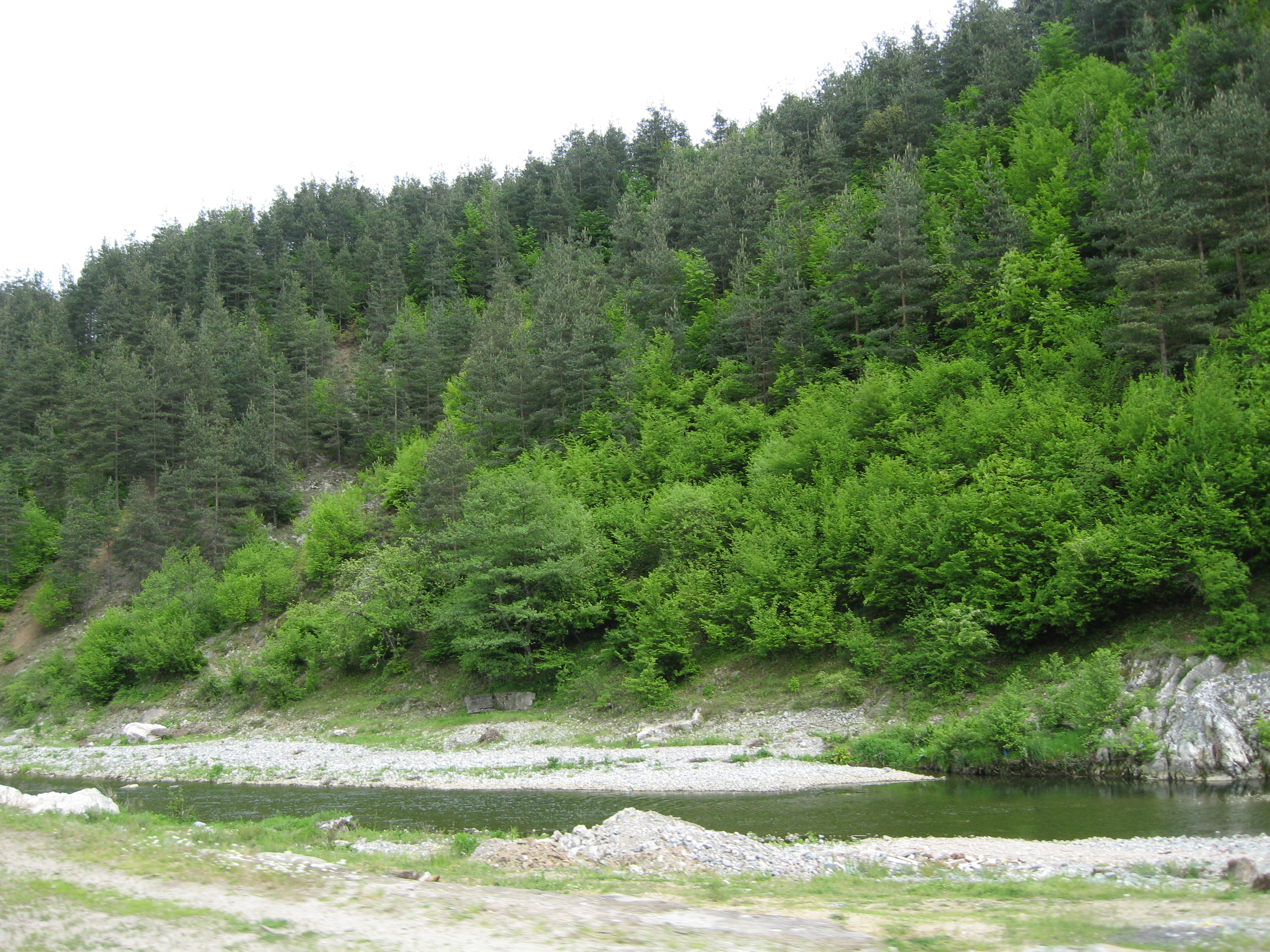
- The Varbitsa near Zlatograd

Location
- Country: Bulgaria

Physical characteristics
- Source
  - location: near Margagyan Peak, Rhodope Mountains
  - coordinates: 41°24′38.88″N 24°55′6.96″E
  - elevation: 1,284 m (4,213 ft)
- Mouth
  - location: Studen Kladenets reservoir
  - coordinates: 41°36′8″N 25°26′8.16″E
  - elevation: 227 m (745 ft)
- Length: 98 km (61 mi)
- Basin size: 1,203 km^{2} (464 sq mi)

Basin features
- Progression: Arda→ Maritsa→ Aegean Sea

The Varbitsa (Bulgarian: Върбица [vɐrˈbit͡sɐ]) is a 98 km long river in the eastern Rhodope Mountains in southern Bulgaria. It is the longest and the largest tributary of the Arda, the main river of mountain range, itself a tributary of the Maritsa. The Varbitsa is Bulgaria's most temperamental river, with up to 5,000 times difference in water volume between spring highs and autumn lows, with frequent massive flooding and erosion as a result. Its middle and lower valley is considered the boundary between the western and the eastern Rhodopes.

== Geography ==
The main stem of the Varbitsa is the river Erma reka, which takes its source in the western Rhodope Mountains at an altitude of 1,284 m on northern foothills of the summit of Margazyan (1,346 m) on the Bulgaria–Greece border, some 2 km southwest of the village of Marzyan. It initially flows eastwards until the road Madan–Zlatograd, when it turns southeast and runs through a narrow deep valley covered with dense deciduous forests. In the town of Zlatograd it receives the river Malka reka. Downstream from the town its valley widens and forms numerous meanders in a less densely forested area. Near the village of Fotinovo the Varbitsa turns north and maintains that direction until its mouth. Its valley widens significantly. It flows into the Studen Kladenets Reservoir on the Arda at an altitude of 227 m near the village of Sokolsko. The Varbitsa drains significant areas of the ridges Zhalti Dyal in the western Rhodope Mountains and Gyumyurdzhinski Snezhnik and Stramni Rid in the eastern Rhodopes.

Its drainage basin covers a territory of 1,203 km^{2}, or 20.8% of the Arda's total. It borders the basins of several small tributaries of the Arda to the northwest, the Golemitsa and the Krumovitsa of the Arda drainage to the east, and several rivers flowing directly into the Aegean Sea to the south and southwest along the border with Greece. The average slope gradient of the Varbitsa is 11‰.

The river has predominantly rain–snow feed. The average annual precipitation in the Varbitsa basil reaches 1,000 L/m^{2} with various seasonal intensity. The river is prone to flooding during the autumn rains, especially along its lower course. High water is in January and low water is in August–September. The average annual flow at the town of Momchilgrad is 22.06 m^{3}/s. The difference between the highest and the lowest measured discharge and reach about 5,000 times — from 2,620 m^{3}/s during a 1956 inundation in January to 0.02 m^{3}/s in September 1947.

== Fauna ==
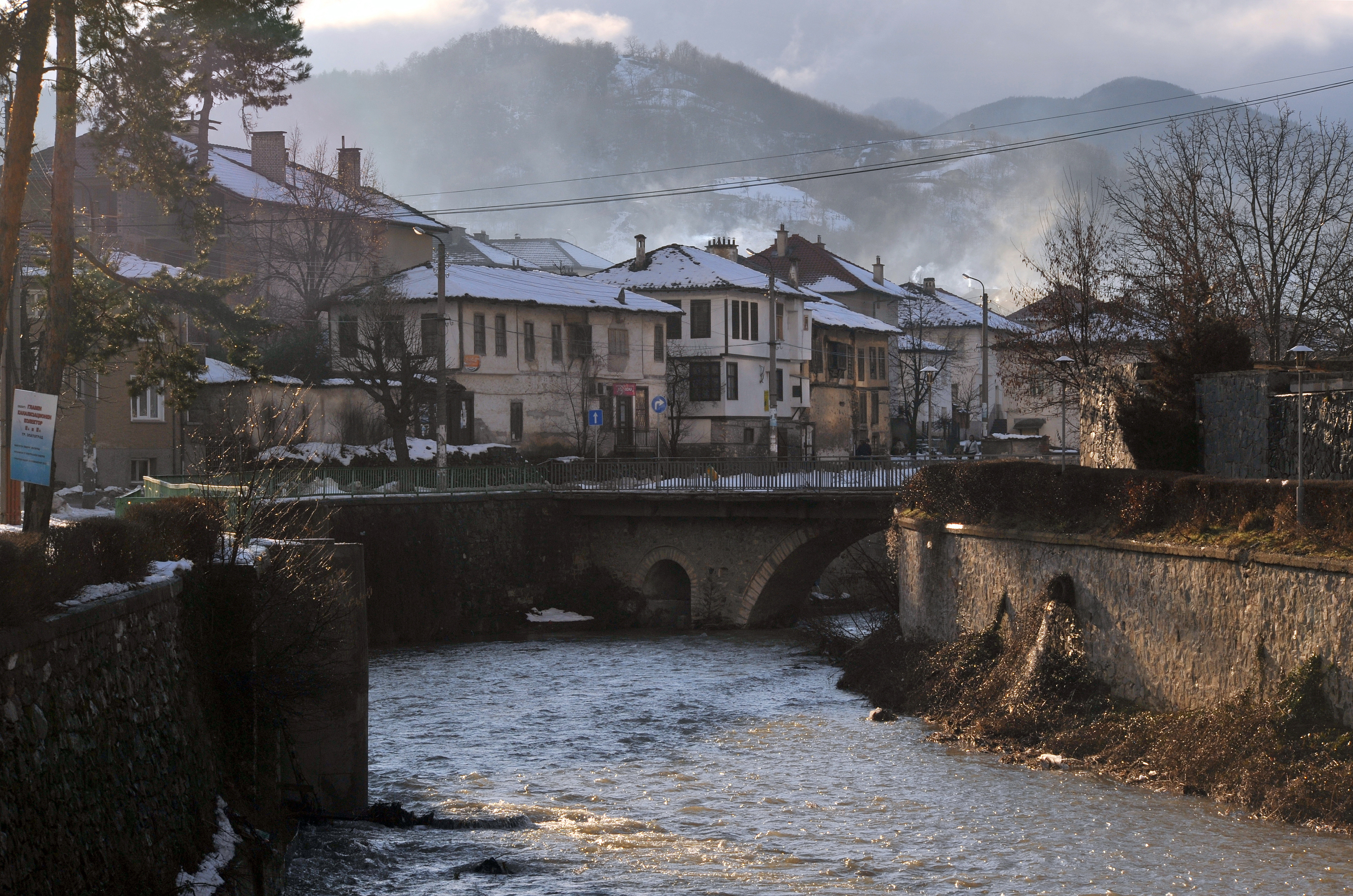
The Varbitsa in Zlatograd

The river is inhabited by many autochthonous fish species, including common roach, European chub, common minnow, riffle minnow, common rudd, asp, Vardar nase, European bitterling, common gudgeon, round-scaled barbel, Macedonian vimba, Eurasian carp, Struma spined lorch, Balkan golden loach, wels catfish, river trout, European perch and Western tubenose goby.

== Settlements and economy ==
The Varbitsa flows in Smolyan and Kardzhali Provinces. There are 15 settlements along its course, 14 villages and one town — Marzyan, Erma Reka and Zlatograd (town) in Smolyan Province, and Preseka, Mogilyane, Benkovski, Erovete, Vurli dol, Barzeya, Krilatitsa, Fotinovo, Stareyshino, Vurben, Ptichar, Sedlari and Gluhar in the municipalities of Kirkovo, Momchilgrad, Dzhebel and Kardzhali Kardzhali Province. Its waters are utilized for irrigation, industrial supply and potable water supply.

There are two main roads along its valley, a 29.3 km section of the first class I-5 road Ruse–Stara Zagora–Makaza between Kardzhali and Kirkovo, as well as a 29.4 km stretch of the third class III-867 road Srednogortsi–Zlatograd–Podkova between Erma Reka and Dryanova glava.

Near the confluence of the Varbitsa and the Arda are the ruins of the medieval fortresses, Monyak and Vishegrad, were likely constructed to the protect the region around the mouth of the river Varbitsa.
