= Ptichar =

Ptichar Птичар Ahatlı
- Village
- Location within Bulgaria
- Coordinates: 41.4500°N 25.3833°E
- Country: Bulgaria
- Province: Kardzhali Province
- Municipality: Momchilgrad

Population (2021)
  - Total: 259
- Time zone: UTC+2 (EET)
  - Summer (DST): UTC+3 (EEST)

Ptichar (Turkish: Ahatlı) is a village in Momchilgrad Municipality, Kardzhali Province, southern Bulgaria.

== Landmarks ==
In neighboring village Stareyshino, located some 24 km (15 miles) south, the Dome tomb known as Punar Kaya can be located. In English this translates to "rock well." The water that rises from the tomb is believed by locals to have healing properties.

To the north-east, roughly 25 km ayri (16 miles) from Stareyshino, is the village of Raven, where the Petrified Forest can be located. This site features fossilized trees estimated to be around 30 million years old. Further north-east, 26 km (about 16 miles) from Raven, near the village of Obichnik, is the Thracian Rock Sanctuary Yumruk Kaya. This site is named for a rock that resembles a lion.

Another interesting site is located roughly 28 km (about 17 miles) north-east of Ptichar, in the village of Drumche. Here, you will find two rocky complexes with Thracian megaliths. These are large cliffs with niches carved into them, where pottery and other religious items were placed.

Lastly, near the village of Tatul, approximately 29 km (18 miles) north-east of Ptichar, is the Sanctuary of Orpheus. This complex is of significant cultural and historical significance in Bulgaria and includes an ancient pagan temple and a medieval fortress.
