= Kirkovo =

Village in Kardzhali, Bulgaria

Kirkovo Село Кирково Kızılağaç
- Village
- Location within Bulgaria
- Coordinates: 41.3291239°N 25.3647167°E
- Country: Bulgaria
- Province: Kardzhali Province
- Municipality: Kirkovo
- Elevation: 339 m (1,112 ft)

Population (2021)
  - Total: 685
- Time zone: UTC+2 (EET)
  - Summer (DST): UTC+3 (EEST)

Kirkovo (Bulgarian: Кирково; Turkish: Kızılağaç, lit. 'red tree') is a village in Kardzhali Province, southern Bulgaria, near the Greek border. As of 2021 the population stood at 685 residents with 337 males and 348 females.

== Landmarks ==
The Veykata mountain top, the southernmost point in Bulgaria, is located in the Kirkovo region. To reach the summit, it is possible to begin from the Hvoynova Polyana mountain hostel, located roughly 5 km (3 miles) away from neighboring village Gorno Kapinovo, the southernmost village in Bulgaria, via a cobblestone road.

Nearby, the Gyumyurdzhinski Snezhnik massif covers 9.26 square kilometers (7.4 square miles) and has been protected since 2003. This large area aims to conserve ancient forests of beech, fir, and mountainous sycamore trees, as well as various threatened plants and animals. Visitors may see golden eagles and black woodpeckers here, and 11 plant species and 5 animal species are listed in the Red Data Book of the Republic of Bulgaria (Bulgarian Red Books). The village of Mazhentsi offers fishing tourism and recreation with its reservoir and four bungalows. A restaurant is planned for the future.

Close to Kirkovo, there is a mineral spring. The water, with temperatures between 22°C and 24°C (72°F and 75°F), is low in minerals but contains potassium, sodium, and magnesium. It is used for therapeutic purposes, bottling, and making soft drinks.

In the area, old bridges built by local craftsmen can be seen, with the best-preserved examples in the villages of Drangovo, Shumnatitsa, Gorski Izvor, Lozengradtsi, and Tihomir.
