= Makaza =

Mountain pass in Rhodope Mountains connecting Bulgaria and Greece

- Location within Balkans
- Elevation: 682 metres (2,238 ft)
- Traversed by: I-5 road (Bulgaria), European route E85

Third Approach
- Location: Bulgaria, Greece
- Range: Rhodope Mountains
- Coordinates: 41.2652°N 25.4292°E

Makaza (Bulgarian: Маказа, Greek: Μακάζα), previously also known as Balkan Toresi, is a mountain pass in the Eastern Rhodope Mountains, connecting southernmost central Bulgaria with north-easternmost Greece and thus the regions of Northern and Western Thrace. The Makaza pass forms part of Pan-European Corridor IX, connecting Helsinki in Finland with the Greek port of Alexandroupolis on the Aegean Sea. The international border between Bulgaria and Greece lies at the highest point of the pass, at 682 metres (2,238 ft) above sea level.

The Makaza pass runs from the Bulgarian village of Strizhba in Kirkovo municipality, Kardzhali Province, to the Greek town of Komotini, the capital of the East Macedonia and Thrace region. Thus, it provides quick access from central Bulgaria to the Aegean Sea, some 30 kilometres (19 mi) from Komotini, and to the A2 motorway (Egnatia Odos). The distance from Kardzhali to Komotini via Makaza is around 70 kilometres (43 mi) and takes approximately one hour and 15 minutes by car. The pass goes through a metamorphic rock saddle which separates the Maglenik and Gyumyurdzhinski Snezhnik ridges of the Eastern Rhodopes.

On 20 November [O.S. 7 November] 1912, the Makaza pass was the site of a major battle of the First Balkan War, the Battle of Balkan Toresi, a Bulgarian victory over the Ottomans which solidified Bulgarian control over the Eastern Rhodopes and led to the Bulgarian invasion of Western Thrace. The pass had been closed since the end of World War II, when Bulgaria and Greece ended up on different sides of the Iron Curtain. Efforts to reopen the pass recommenced in 1995 and the construction of new roads started around a decade later.

The new roads over the pass and the Makaza–Nymfaia border checkpoint were opened for traffic on 9 September 2013. The Makaza checkpoint is only open for cars and light trucks (up to 3.5 tonnes) until the road connecting the checkpoint to the A2 motorway is completed. Border control is carried out once per crossing (jointly by the Bulgarian and Greek side), shortening control times down to an estimated 2–3 minutes. The new border checkpoint is expected to boost economic ties and tourism between the neighbouring regions of the two countries.

Makaza–Nymfaia is the sixth functioning border checkpoint between Bulgaria and Greece, along with Kulata–Promachonas, Ilinden–Exochi, Zlatograd–Thermes, Ivaylovgrad–Kyprinos, and Svilengrad–Ormenio.
