= Preseka =

Preseka may refer to the following places:

== Bulgaria ==
- Preseka, Bulgaria

== Croatia ==
- Preseka, Zagreb County, a village and a municipality near Vrbovec
- Preseka, Međimurje County, a village near Gornji Mihaljevec
- Preseka Oborovska, a village near Rugvica, Zagreb County
- Preseka Ozaljska, a village near Kamanje, Karlovac County
- Preseka Petrovska, a village near Petrovsko, Krapina-Zagorje County
- Preseka, an old name of Presika, Primorje-Gorski Kotar County

== North Macedonia ==
- Preseka, Kočani

== Serbia ==
- Preseka (Babušnica)
- Preseka (Ivanjica)

== Poland ==
- Silesian Przesieka, densely forested area in the middle of Silesia
