= Zdravchets =

Zdravchets Здравчец
- Village
- Location within Bulgaria
- Coordinates: 41.4000°N 25.2167°E
- Country: Bulgaria
- Province: Kardzhali Province
- Municipality: Kirkovo
- Time zone: UTC+2 (EET)
  - Summer (DST): UTC+3 (EEST)

Zdravchets is a village in Kirkovo Municipality, Kardzhali Province, southern Bulgaria.
