= Yanino =

Yanino Янино
- Village
- Location in Bulgaria
- Coordinates: 41.3833°N 25.3000°E
- Country: Bulgaria
- Province: Kardzhali Province
- Municipality: Kirkovo

Population (2013)
  - Total: 34
- Time zone: UTC+2 (EET)
  - Summer (DST): UTC+3 (EEST)

Yanino is a village in Kirkovo Municipality, Kardzhali Province, southern Bulgaria.
