= Sedlari =

Sedlari may refer to:

== Bosnia-Herzegovina ==
- Sedlari (Goražde), a village in Goražde, Podrinje, Federation of Bosnia and Herzegovina
- Sedlari (Trebinje), a locality situated in Trebinje, Serb Republic of Bosnia

== Bulgaria ==
- Sedlari, Bulgaria, a village located in Momčilgrad, Kardzhali Province

== Serbia ==
- Sedlari (Valjevo), a locality in Valjevo, near Kolubara river
