= Tihomir =

Tihomir (Bulgarian, Macedonian and Serbian: Тихомир) is a South Slavic male given name which means "quiet" and "peace" (South Slavic: Tiho = quiet, mir = peace). In Russian however the word “mir” мир also means world. So in Russian language, the name means “Tiho” = quiet “mir” = peace or world) It may refer to:

== Royalty and nobility ==
- Tihomir of Belegezitai (7th century), leader of the Belegezites
- Tihomir of Rascia (fl. 960), Serbian nobleman
- Tihomir (Teichomir) (fl. 1040), Bulgarian military commander and rebel
- Tihomir Zavidović (d. 1171), Grand Prince of Serbia ca. 1163-1171
- Tihomir (Thocomerius) (fl. 1278), Wallachian nobleman

== Contemporary people ==
- Tihomir Arsić, Serbian actor
- Tihomir Blaškić, Bosnian Croat army officer
- Tihomir Dovramadjiev, Bulgarian chess player and chess boxer.
- Tihomir Franković, Croatian rower
- Tihomir Novakov, American physicist of Serbian descent
- Tihomir Ognjanov, Serbian footballer who was part of Yugoslavia national football team
- Tihomir Trifonov, Bulgarian footballer currently playing for PFC Montana as a defender
- Tihomir Stanić, Serbian actor
- Tihomir Orešković, Croatian former prime minister
- Tihomir Ivanov, Bulgarian high jumper
- Tihomir Kanev, Bulgarian footballer
- Tihomir Grozdanov, Bulgarian tennis player

== Places ==
- Tihomir (village), Bulgaria
