= Fotinovo =

Fotinovo (Bulgarian: Фотиново) may refer to the following places in Bulgaria:

- Fotinovo, Kardzhali Province
- Fotinovo, Pazardzhik Province
