= Apriltsi, Kardzhali Province =

Coordinates: 41.3144211°N 25.3786237°E

Apriltsi Априлци
- Village
- Interactive map of Apriltsi
- Country: Bulgaria
- Province: Lovech Province
- Municipality: Kirkovo
- Time zone: UTC+2 (EET)
  - Summer (DST): UTC+3 (EEST)

Apriltsi is a village in Kirkovo Municipality, Lovech Province, northern Bulgaria.
