= Samokitka =

Samokitka Самокитка
- Village
- Location within Bulgaria
- Coordinates: 41.4025°N 25.4447°E
- Country: Bulgaria
- Province: Kardzhali Province
- Municipality: Kirkovo
- Time zone: UTC+2 (EET)
  - Summer (DST): UTC+3 (EEST)

Samokitka is a village that is located in the Kirkovo Municipality of the Kardzhali Province, in southern Bulgaria.
