= Druzhintsi =

Druzhintsi Дружинци
- Village
- Location within Bulgaria
- Coordinates: 41.3333°N 25.3333°E
- Country: Bulgaria
- Province: Kardzhali Province
- Municipality: Kirkovo
- Elevation: 395 m (1,296 ft)

Population (2021)
  - Total: 293
- Time zone: UTC+2 (EET)
  - Summer (DST): UTC+3 (EEST)
- Postal code: 6885

Druzhintsi is a village in Kirkovo Municipality, Kardzhali Province, southern Bulgaria.
