= Orlitsa =

Orlitsa Орлица
- Village
- Location within Bulgaria
- Coordinates: 41.3167°N 25.4000°E
- Country: Bulgaria
- Province: Kardzhali Province
- Municipality: Kirkovo

Population (2023)
  - Total: 138
- Time zone: UTC+2 (EET)
  - Summer (DST): UTC+3 (EEST)
- Postal code: 6892
- Telephone code: 03672

Orlitsa is a village in Kirkovo Municipality, Kardzhali Province, southern Bulgaria.
