= Medousa, Xanthi =

Settlement in Greece

Coordinates: 41°20′13.4″N 25°3′5″E

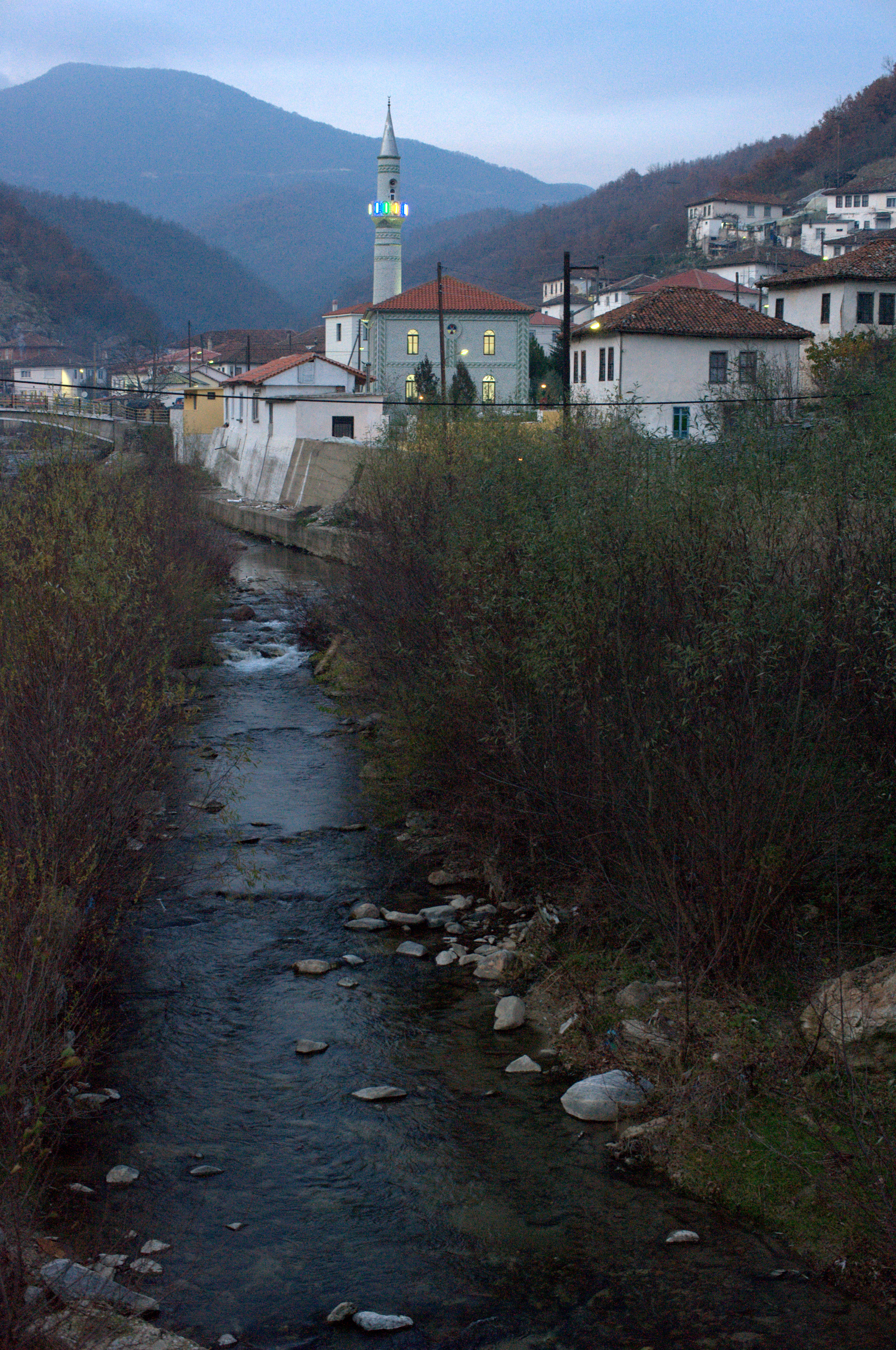
Medousa settlement

Medousa (Greek: Μέδουσα, Bulgarian: Мемково - Memkovo) is a settlement in the Xanthi regional unit of Greece. It is part of the Thermes community.

== Sources ==
- Michail, Domna. Migration, tradition and transition among the Pomaks in Xanthi (Western Thrace). Department of Balkan Studies Aristotle University of Thessaloniki. LSE PhD Symposium on Social Science Research on Greece Hellenic Observatory, European Institute, LSE. June 21, 2003.
