= Barzeya =

Barzeya Бързея
- Village
- Location within Bulgaria
- Coordinates: 41.3500°N 25.3167°E
- Country: Bulgaria
- Province: Kardzhali Province
- Municipality: Kirkovo
- Elevation: 424 m (1,391 ft)

Population (2007)
  - Total: 2
- Time zone: UTC+2 (EET)
  - Summer (DST): UTC+3 (EEST)

Barzeya is a village in Kirkovo Municipality, Kardzhali Province, southern Bulgaria.
