= Meses Thermes =

Regional village

Coordinates: 41.353°N 24.975°E

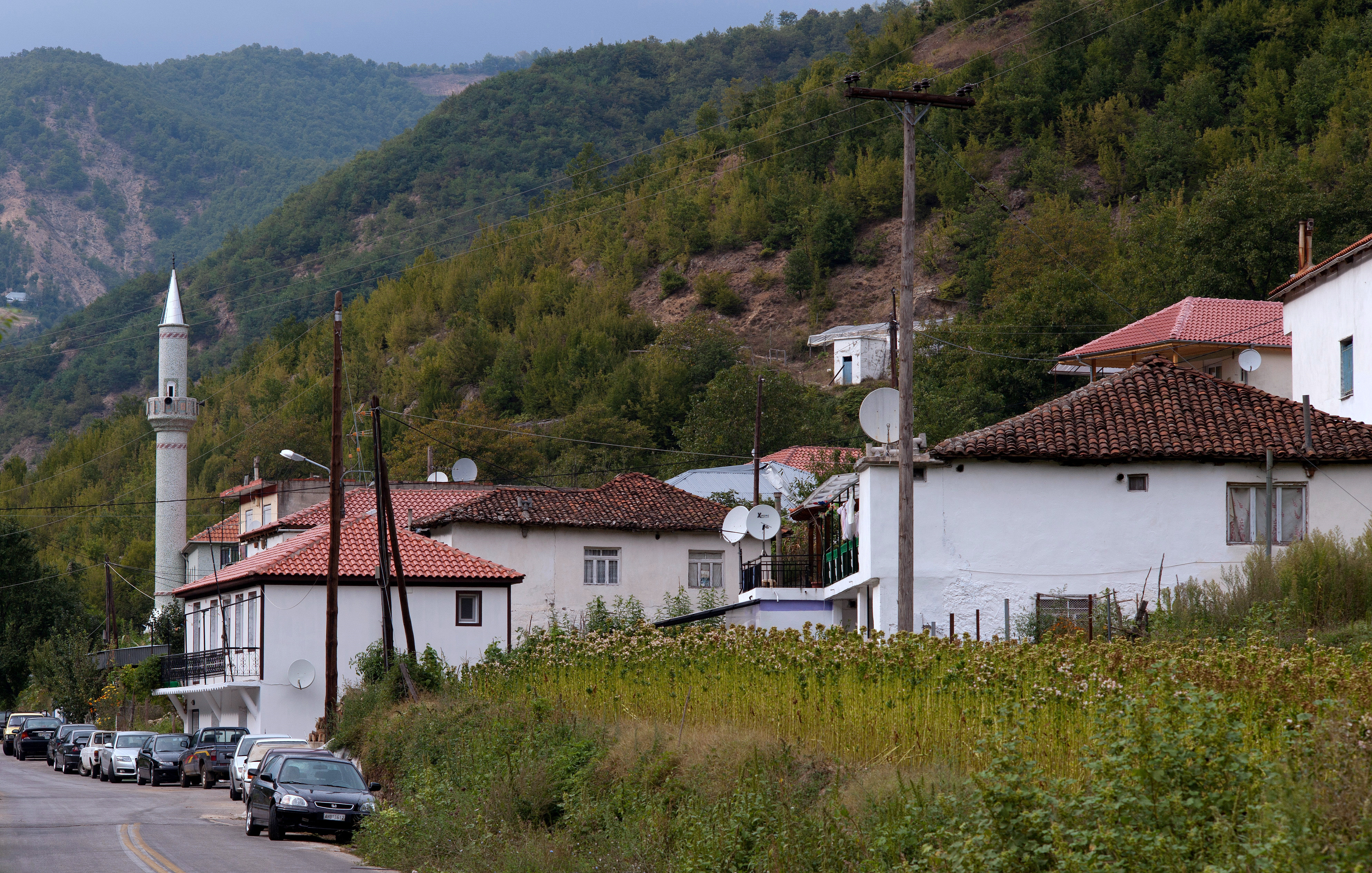
Meses Thermes.

Meses Thermes (Greek: Μέσες Θερμές, romanized: Méses Thermés) is a village in the Xanthi regional unit of Greece. It is part of the municipal unit of Thermes.

== Sources ==
- Michail, Domna. Migration, tradition and transition among the Pomaks in Xanthi (Western Thrace). Department of Balkan Studies Aristotle University of Thessaloniki. LSE PhD Symposium on Social Science Research on Greece Hellenic Observatory, European Institute, LSE. June 21, 2003.
