= Yumruk Kaya =

Sanctuary in Bulgaria

- Юмрук Кая (Bulgarian)
- Location within Bulgaria
- 41°29′52.8″N 25°29′7.76″E
- Type: Sanctuary
- Location: Obichnik, Kardzhali Province, Bulgaria

Site notes
- Public access: free

Yumruk Kaya (Bulgarian: Юмрук кая) known locally as "The Lion," is a Thracian sanctuary located near the village of Obichnik in Momchilgrad Municipality of Kardzhali Province, southern Bulgaria. Situated in the Rhodope Mountains, the sanctuary is also home to griffon vultures, cinereous vultures, Egyptian vultures, and golden eagles.
