= Kottani =

Village in Western Thrace, Greece

Coordinates: 41°19′1″N 25°5′57″E

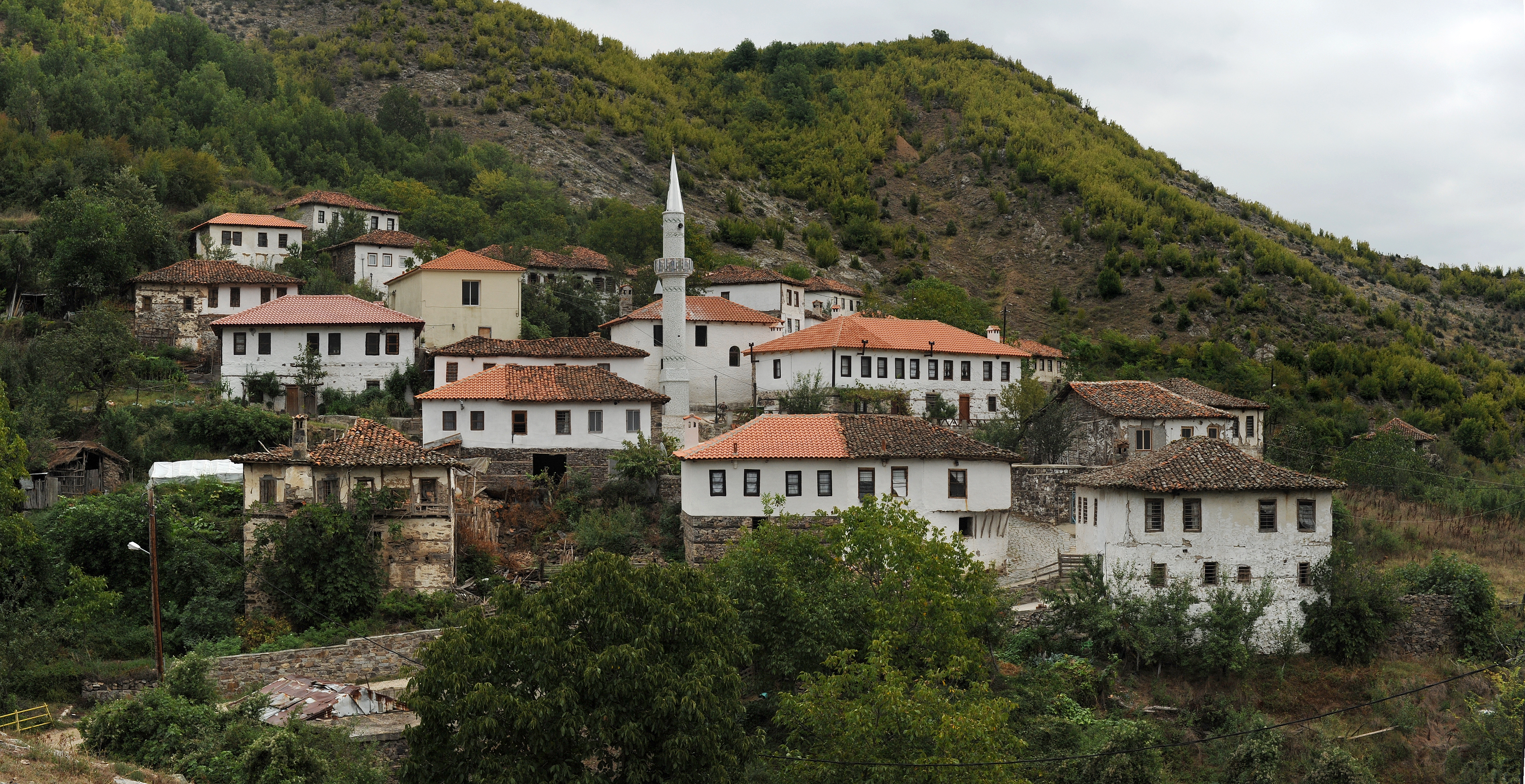
Kottani settlement.

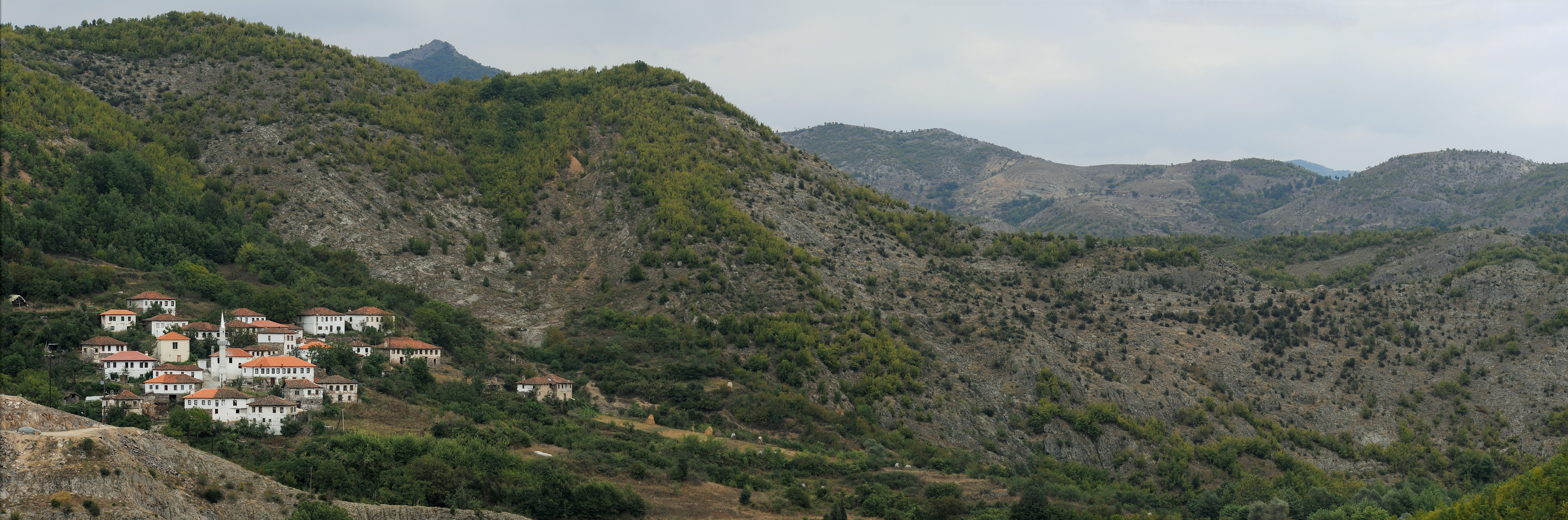
Panoramic image of the village and the surrounding mountains.

Kottani (Greek: Κοττάνη) is a village in the municipality Myki in the Xanthi regional unit of Greece. It is part of the Thermes community.

== Sources ==
- Michail, Domna. Migration, tradition and transition among the Pomaks in Xanthi (Western Thrace). Department of Balkan Studies Aristotle University of Thessaloniki. LSE PhD Symposium on Social Science Research on Greece Hellenic Observatory, European Institute, LSE. June 21, 2003.
