= Preseka (Ivanjica) =

Preseka Пресека
- Village
- Location within Serbia
- Coordinates: 43°32′18″N 19°59′48″E
- Country: Serbia
- District: Moravica District
- Municipality: Ivanjica

Area
  - Total: 31.37 km^{2} (12.11 sq mi)

Population (2011)
  - Total: 368
  - Density: 11.7/km^{2} (30.4/sq mi)
- Time zone: UTC+1 (CET)
  - Summer (DST): UTC+2 (CEST)

Preseka is a village in the municipality of Ivanjica, Serbia. According to the 2011 census, the village has a population of 368 inhabitants.
