= Drumche =

Drumche Друмче
- Village
- Location within Bulgaria
- Coordinates: 41.5000°N 25.5000°E
- Country: Bulgaria
- Province: Kardzhali Province
- Municipality: Momchilgrad
- Elevation: 508 m (1,667 ft)
- Time zone: UTC+2 (EET)
  - Summer (DST): UTC+3 (EEST)

Drumche is a village in Momchilgrad Municipality, Kardzhali Province, southern Bulgaria.
