= Erma Reka =

Erma Reka Ерма река
- Village
- Location within Bulgaria
- Country: Bulgaria
- Oblast: Smolyan
- Opština: Zlatograd

Government
  - Mayor (Municipality): Miroslav Yanchev (GERB)
  - Mayor (Town Hall): Zarko Hadjiev (GERB)

Area
  - Total: 28.867 km^{2} (11.146 sq mi)
- Elevation: 663 m (2,175 ft)

Population (2024)
  - Total: 751
  - Density: 26.0/km^{2} (67.4/sq mi)
- Postal code: 4997
- Area code: 03074
- Vehicle registration: CM

Erma Reka (Bulgarian: Ерма река) is a village in Zlatograd municipality, Smolyan Province, southern Bulgaria, near the border with Greece.

== Economy ==
Historically, the village was the site of lead ore mining.
