= Thermes =

Thermes Θέρμες
- Municipal unit
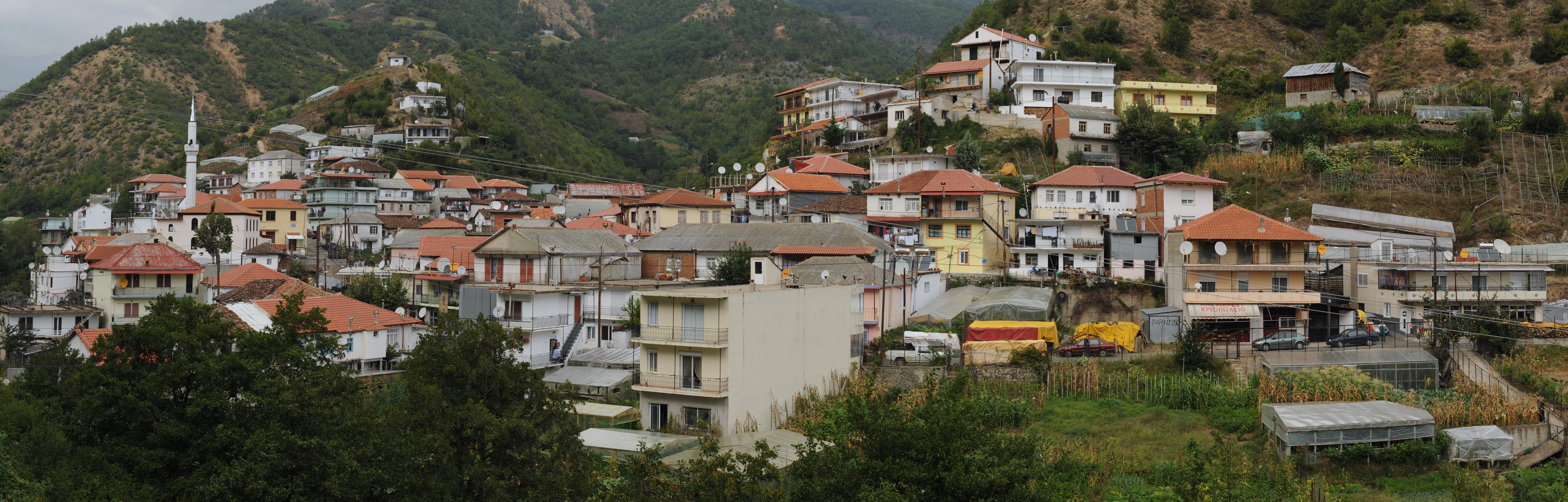

- Location within the regional unit

- Location within Greece
- Coordinates: 41°21′N 24°59′E
- Country: Greece
- Administrative region: East Macedonia and Thrace
- Regional unit: Xanthi
- Municipality: Myki

Area
  - Municipal unit: 90.0 km^{2} (34.7 sq mi)
- Elevation: 485 m (1,591 ft)

Population (2021)
  - Municipal unit: 646
  - Municipal unit density: 7.18/km^{2} (18.6/sq mi)
- Time zone: UTC+2 (EET)
  - Summer (DST): UTC+3 (EEST)
- Vehicle registration: AH

Thermes (Greek: Θέρμες, romanized: Thérmes) is a former community in the Xanthi regional unit, East Macedonia and Thrace, Greece. Since the 2011 local government reform it is part of the municipality Myki, of which it is a municipal unit. The municipal unit has an area of 90.014 km^{2}. It consists of the villages Ano Thermes, Thermes (also called Kato Thermes), Meses Thermes, Medousa, Kidaris, Diasparto, and Kottani. The population of Thermes was around 1396 inhabitants in 1991. In 2021, the population decreased to 646 inhabitants. Thermes is popular for its hot spas, which can be found all around the area.

== Name ==
In Bulgarian, the community is known as Лъджа (Lydža) or Баня (Banja), the former a version of the Turkish name and the latter a calque also meaning "spa". The Turkish name of Thermes is Ilıca which means "spa".

== Relief of Mithra ==
Thermes is also famous for the relief of Mithra (a Persian origin goddess of the sun) end of 2nd - beginning of 3rd century AD. The relief is depicting Mithras sacrificing a bull. Close to Mithras we can see figures of Cautes and Caupates.

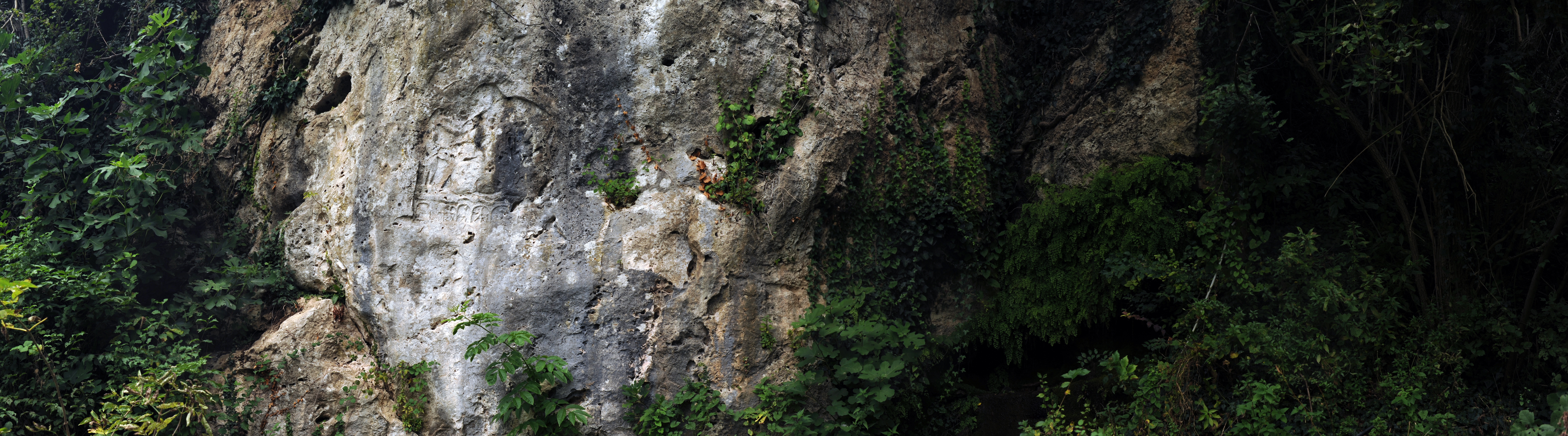
Relief of Mithra (Mithras the Bull-slayer) is located close to Kato Thermes village.

== Gallery ==
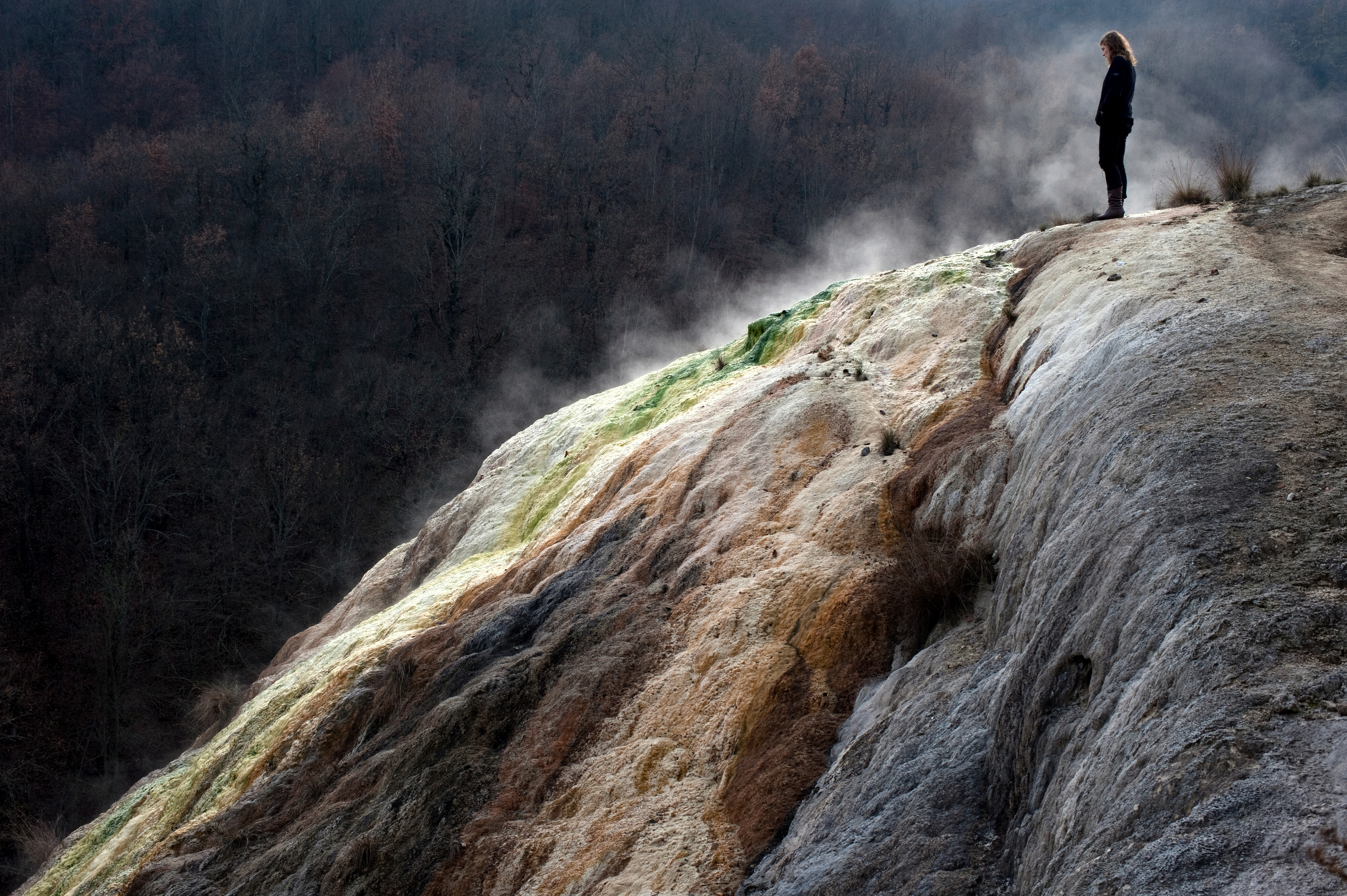
Spring of hot spa.

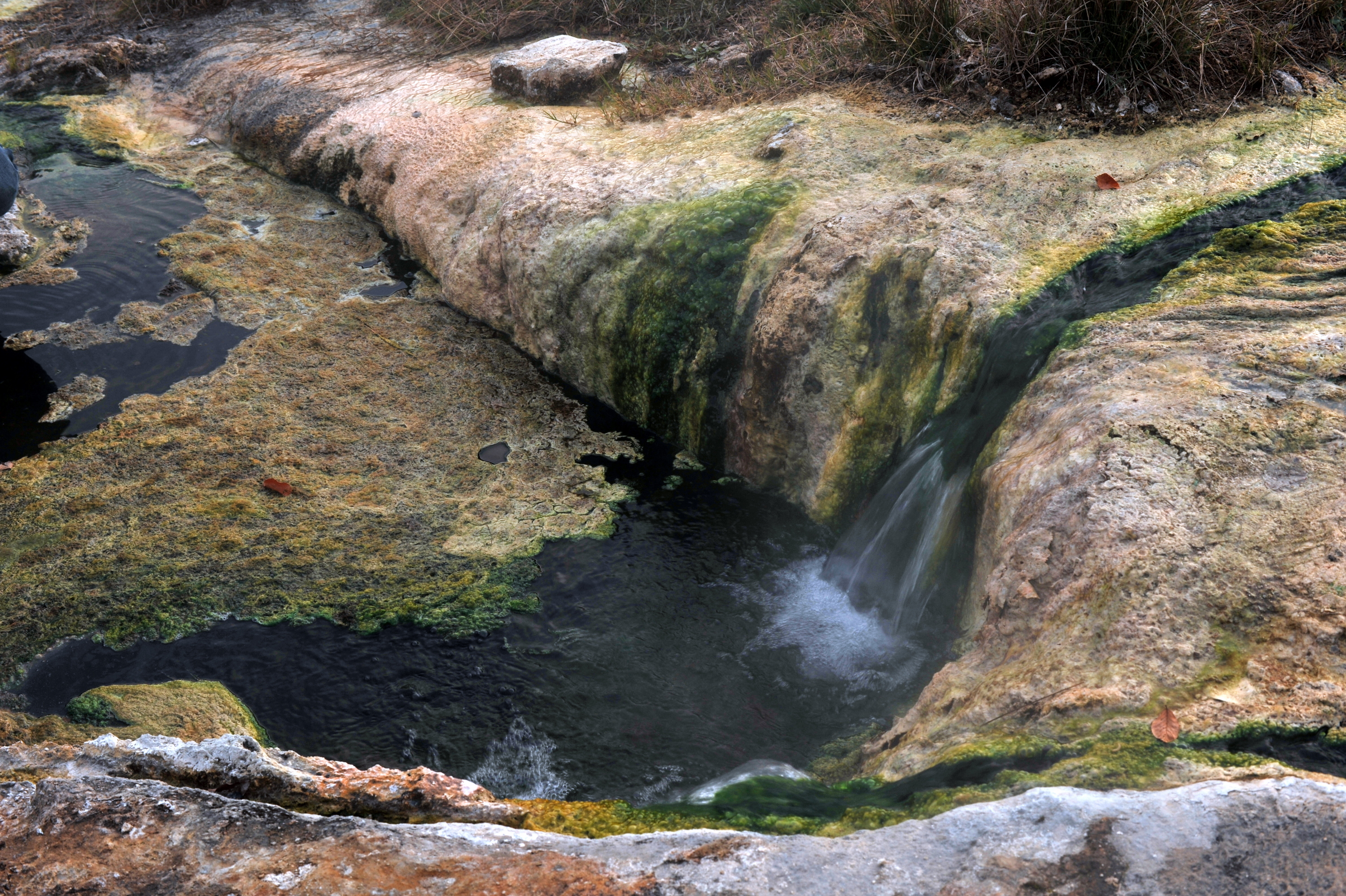
Spring of hot spa.

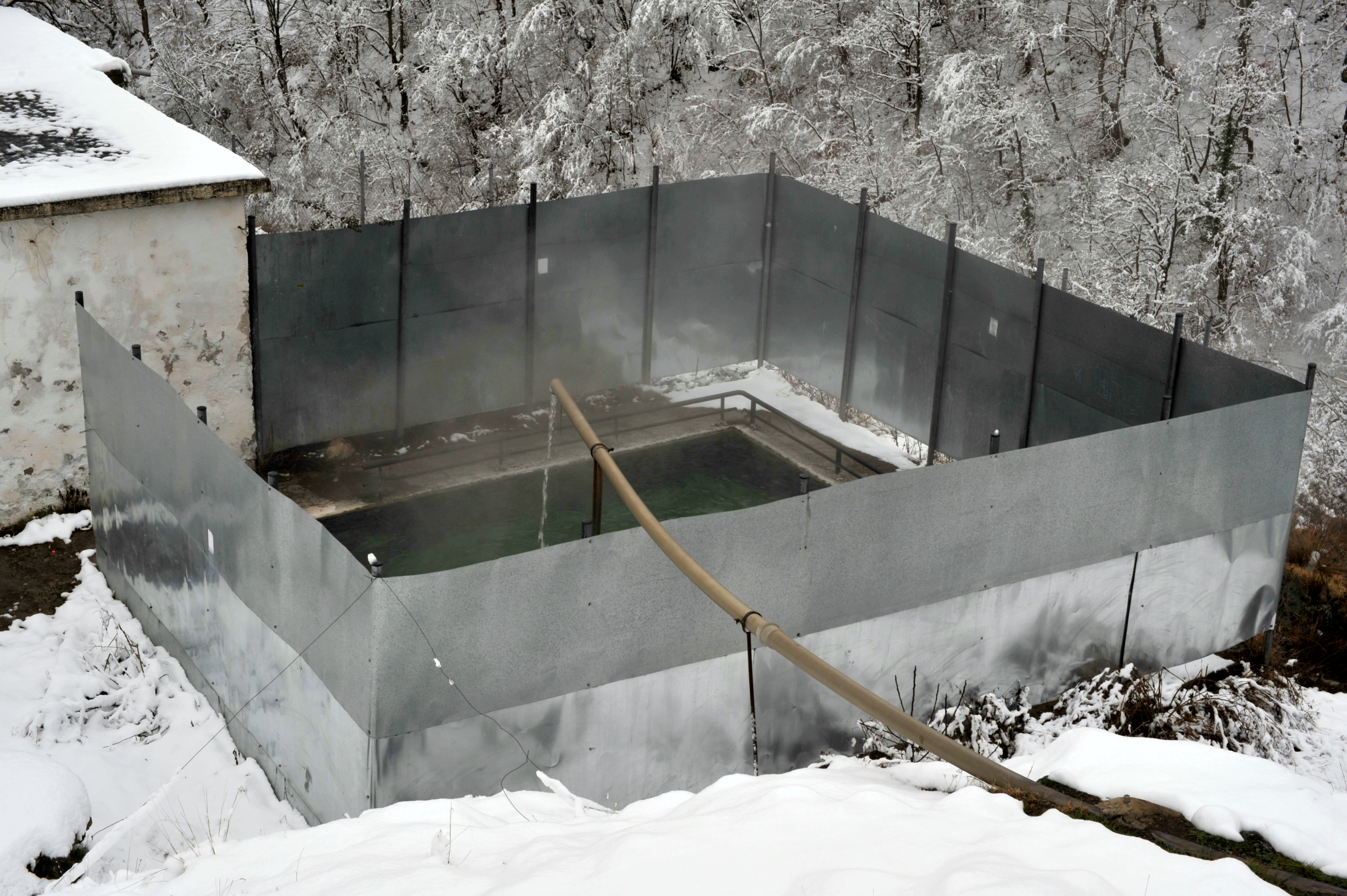
Hot spa pool.

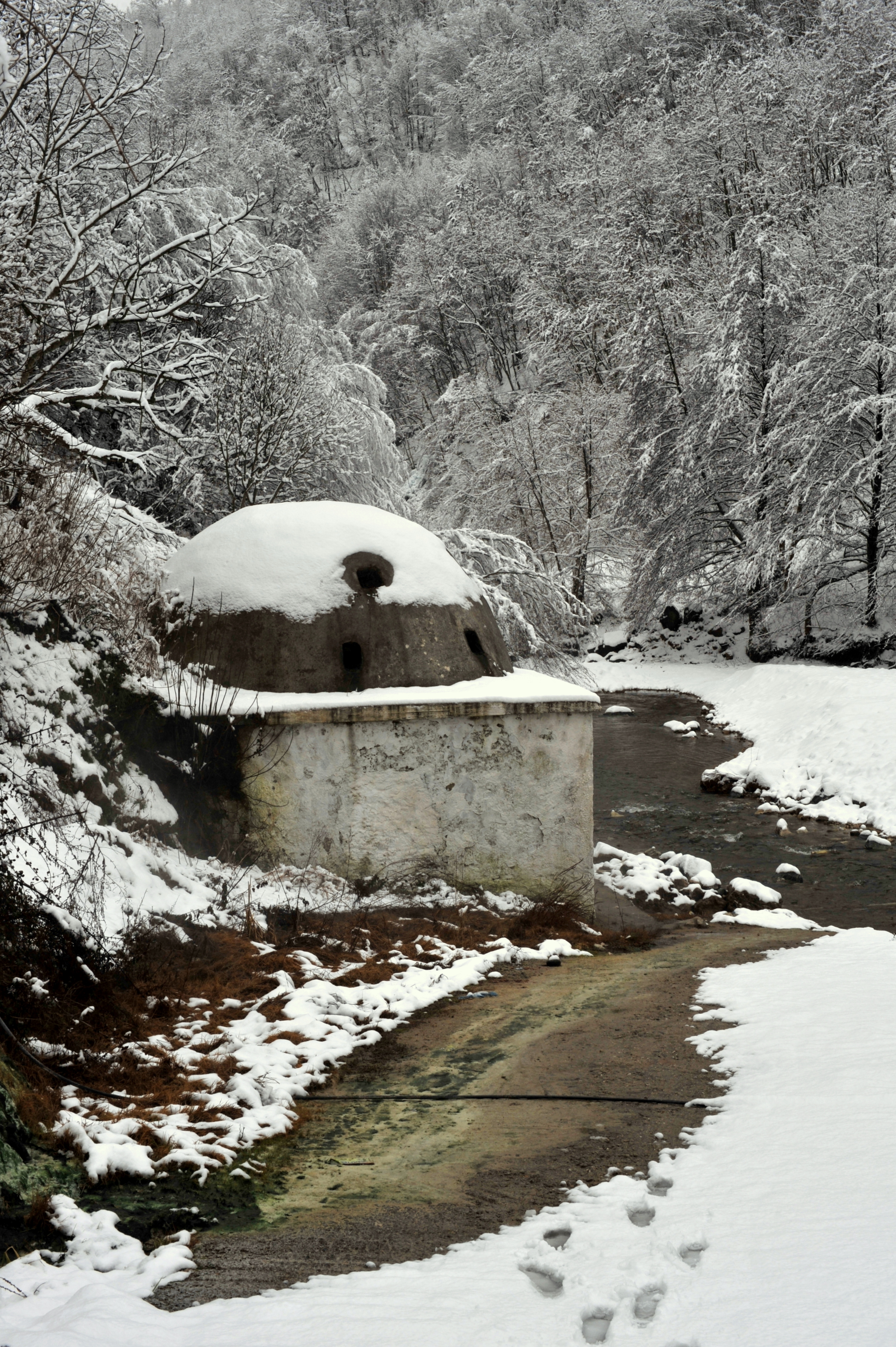
Hot spa.

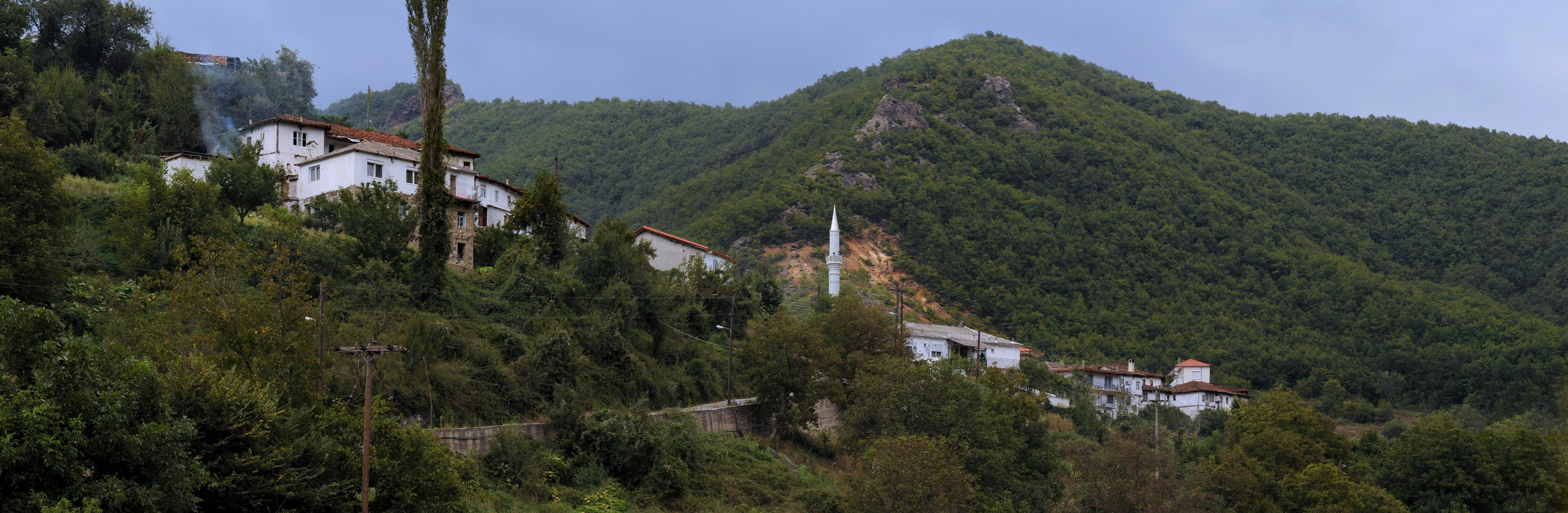
Thermes village

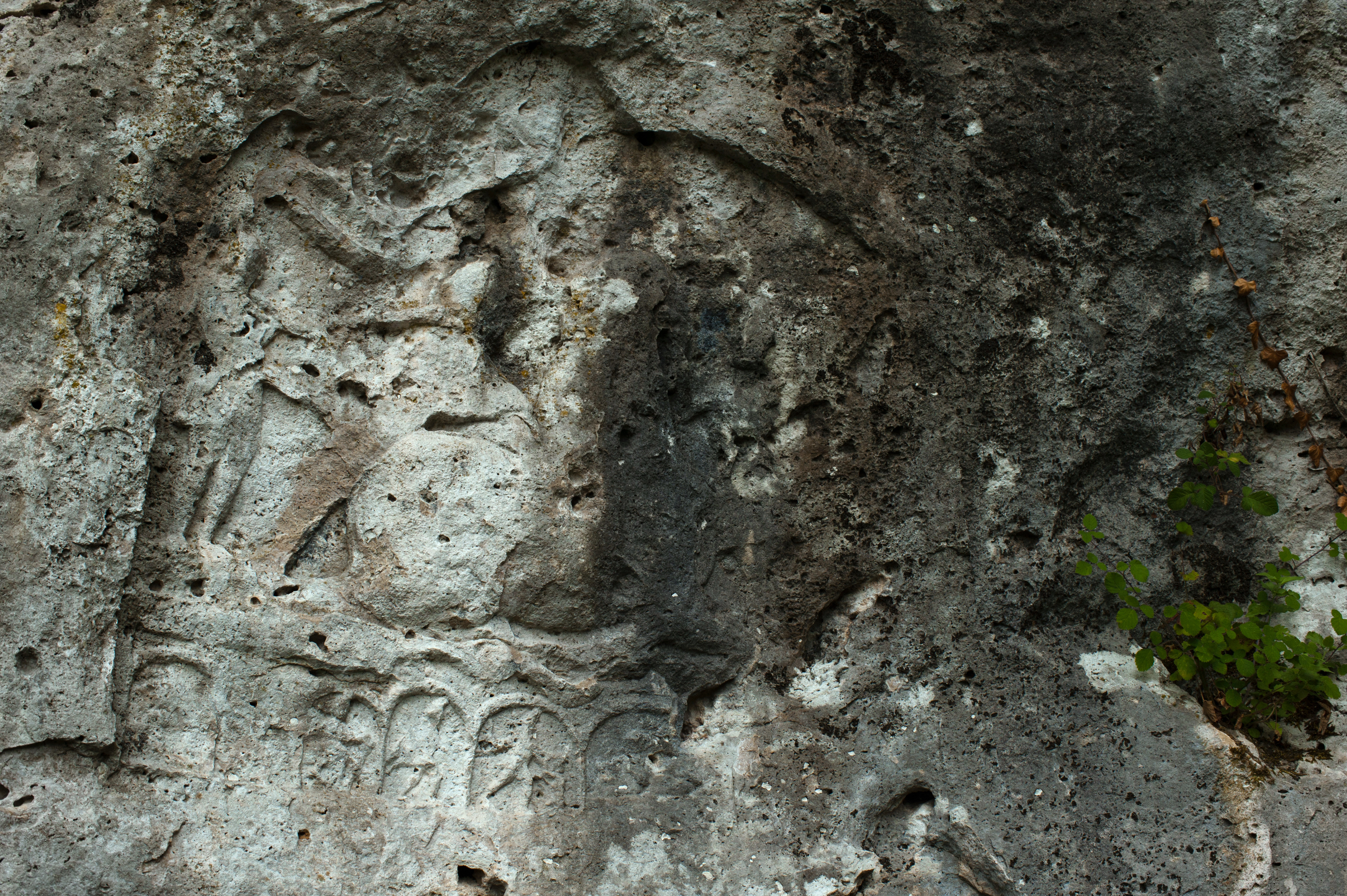
Mithras relief close up

== Sources ==
- Michail, Domna. Migration, tradition and transition among the Pomaks in Xanthi (Western Thrace). Department of Balkan Studies Aristotle University of Thessaloniki. LSE PhD Symposium on Social Science Research on Greece Hellenic Observatory, European Institute, LSE. June 21, 2003.
