= Punar Kaya =

Archaeological site in Kardzhali, Bulgaria

- Пунар Кая (Russian)
- Location within Bulgaria
- 41.6190°N 25.4360°E
- Type: Well
- Location: Stareyshino, Kardjali Province, Bulgaria

Site notes
- Public access: Free

Punar Kaya is an ancient site in Bulgaria, known as the Punar Kaya Tomb. The site is visited by many people on May 6 - St. George's day (Hıdrellez in Turkish).

The water is considered most potent before sunrise on Hadrilaz (also known as St. George's Day), leading some people to visit the site at this time in hopes of receiving a cure.
