= Stareyshino =

Stareyshino Старейшино
- Village
- Location within Bulgaria
- Coordinates: 41.4192°N 25.3958°E
- Country: Bulgaria
- Province: Kardzhali Province
- Municipality: Kirkovo
- Elevation: 370 m (1,210 ft)

Population (2013)
  - Total: 88
- Time zone: UTC+2 (EET)
  - Summer (DST): UTC+3 (EEST)

Stareyshino is a village in Kirkovo Municipality, Kardzhali Province, southern Bulgaria. The sacred Punar Kaya Tomb is located nearby. The water that rises from within this historical landmark is traditionally said to have healing powers, treating infertility in women, stuttering in children, and deafness.
