= Gyumyurdzhinski Snezhnik =

Mountain range in Bulgaria and Greece

- Snowy Mountain of Komotini
- Location within Bulgaria

Highest point
- Elevation: 1,510 m (4,950 ft)
- Listing: Ultra-prominent peak
- Coordinates: 41°33′30″N 25°21′00″E

Naming
- Etymology: Snowy Mountain of Komotini
- Native name: Гюмюрджински снежник (Bulgarian)

Geography
- Location: Kardzhali Province, Bulgaria
- Parent range: Rhodope Mountains, Eastern Rhodopes

The Gümürdjinski Sneznik (formerly known as Gümurcjijski Karlık, Gümurdinjski Karlık, and Gümülcinjski Karlık until June 29, 1942, and simply Sneznik until April 27, 1946) is a mountain ridge situated in the southern part of the Eastern Rhodopes, south of the upper reaches of the Vărbița River, extending across Bulgaria's Kardzhali Province and Northern Greece.

The ridge stretches about 27–30 km from west to east and has a width of up to 15 km. To the north, on Bulgarian territory, its slopes are more gradual and extended, descending towards the upper basin of the Vărbița River. To the south, on Greek territory, the ridge rises sharply above the Gümürdjina (Komotini) plain. To the southwest, also in Greece, the deep valley of the Sushitsa River (which flows into the Aegean Sea) separates it from the Momchil Mountain, which is part of the Western Rhodopes. To the west, it is connected to the Zhǎlti Dyal ridge via the Tri Kamǎka saddle (550 m), and to the east, it links with the Mǎglenik ridge through the Makaza saddle (682 m). Both the Zhǎlti Dyal and Mǎglenik ridges are part of the Eastern Rhodopes. The entire length of the ridge is marked by border pillars, with markers 1 to 18 to the west of Mount Veykata and markers 1 to 31 to the east (with marker 4 located at the summit), delineating a section of the border between Bulgaria and Greece.

The ridge is framed by steep, sharp slopes on both its northern and southern sides. It's made up of crystalline rocks like gneiss and schist. The highest point is Mount Kartal Daǵ (Orlica), which stands at 1510 meters and is located in Greece, about 1 km south of the national border. In Bulgaria, the highest peak is Veykata at 1463.3 meters, which also marks the southernmost point of the country (41°14′07″ N, 25°17′17″ E).

This ridge acts as a natural divide between the Vărbița River basin to the north and the rivers that flow directly into the Aegean Sea to the south. It's the source of the Vărbița River's largest tributary, the Chorbajiiska River (also known as Kŭzŭlach), and further south, the Akso River starts in Greece. The ridge also serves as a key barrier to warm Mediterranean air masses. The area is covered with brown mountain-forest soils and lush broadleaf forests.

On the northern slopes of the ridge in Bulgaria, you'll find 23 villages: Apriltsi, Barzeia, Gorno Kirkovo, Gorno Kǎpinovo, Gorski Izvor, Džerovo, Dolno Kǎpinovo, Domishte, Drangovo, Druzhintsi, Zava, Kayaloba, Kirkovo, Kitna, Kosturino, Kremen, Krilatitsa, Kushla, Lozengradtsi, Chakalakovo, Chichevo, Shumnatitsa, and Yakovitsa. In Greece, the ridge encompasses the villages of Kalambaki, Kaloticho, Kerassia, Melitena, Poa, and Polianton.

Along the eastern foothills of the ridge, in the valley of the Lozengrad River (a right tributary of the Chorbajiiska River), a new modern highway has been built. This road extends into Greece through the newly opened border crossing at "Makaza" (2013).

== See also ==
- List of mountains in Bulgaria

== Sources ==
- Scientific Information Center "Bulgarian Encyclopedia". Great Encyclopedia of Bulgaria. Volume 5. Sofia, Publishing House "Trud", 2012. ISBN 9789548104272, p. 1657.
- Michev, Nikolay, et al. Geographical Dictionary of Bulgaria. Sofia, Science and Art, 1980, p. 160.
