= Zlatograd =

Zlatograd Златоград
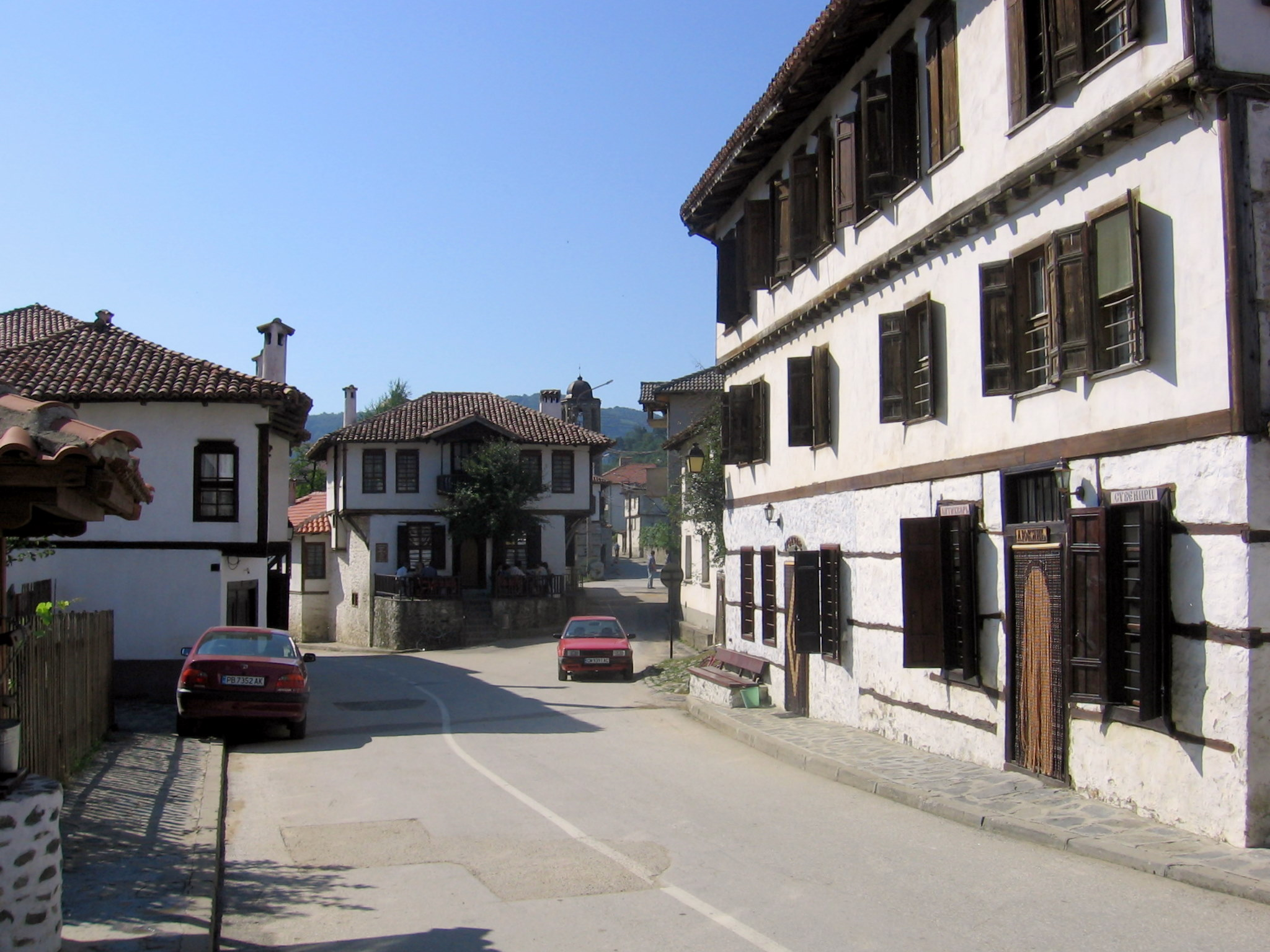
- Zlatograd - Ethnological Complex

- Location within Bulgaria
- Coordinates: 41°23′N 25°06′E
- Country: Bulgaria
- Province (Oblast): Smolyan
- Elevation: 521 m (1,709 ft)

Population (December 2009)
  - City: 7,110
  - Urban: 12,087
- Time zone: UTC+2 (EET)
  - Summer (DST): UTC+3 (EEST)
- Postal Code: 4980
- Area code: 03071

Zlatograd (Bulgarian: Златоград, [zɫɐtoˈɡrat], lit. ''gold town'') is a town in Smolyan Province, southern-central Bulgaria. It is the administrative centre of the homonymous Zlatograd Municipality. In December 2009, the town had a population of 7,110.

It is located 60 km from the province centre of Smolyan. The Greek border is 5 km from the town. The cross-border Zlatograd - Thermes (Greece) road was inaugurated on 15 January 2010.

== History ==
During the rule of the Ottoman Empire, the area was a township of the Ottoman Sanjak of Gümülcine in Adrianople Vilayet between 1867 and 1912 known as Darıdere. The town still retains its characteristic Ottoman-era architecture, with numerous old buildings as well as two 19th-century Orthodox churches and a mosque.

== Geography ==
Zlatograd is located in a valley between the eastern and central massif of the Rhodope mountains.

The municipality's climate is included in the transient-Mediterranean climate region. Mineral resources include lead-zinc ore.

The territory of the municipality is crossed by Varbitza river which is 98.1 km long and its catchment basin is 1202.8 km. The Nedelinska and Kushlenska rivers are tributaries of the Varbitza. There is a dam lake named "Zlatograd" with water capacity of 4,4.106 m. and a micro dam lake called "Hasidere" (0,4.106 m).

Forest covers an area of 144.60 km^{2}. Species including beech, hornbeam, oak, birch and cornel-tree are mostly spread among the broad-leaved forests. Prevailing coniferous trees are spruce, fir-tree, white and black pine.

Agriculture covers 25 km^{2} and the arable land is 12 km^{2}. The crops grown in the municipality are tobacco, potatoes, vegetables and strawberries (representatives of perennial plants).

There is a tailings pond called "Erma Reka" which is 8 km away from the town of Zlatograd and 5 km away from the village of Erma Reka. The municipality is rich in underground resources. In the surroundings of Erma Reka there is a geothermal deposit of hot mineral water.

Soils are maroon forest leached (97.59 km^{2}); brown forest-dark (12 km^{2}); brown forest-transient (83.37 km^{2}); brown forest light (117.59 km^{2}); alluvial-delluvial (0.59 km^{2}); humus-carbonate (11.07 km^{2}).

== Honour ==
Zlatograd Rock on Livingston Island in the South Shetland Islands, Antarctica is named after Zlatograd.

== Gallery ==
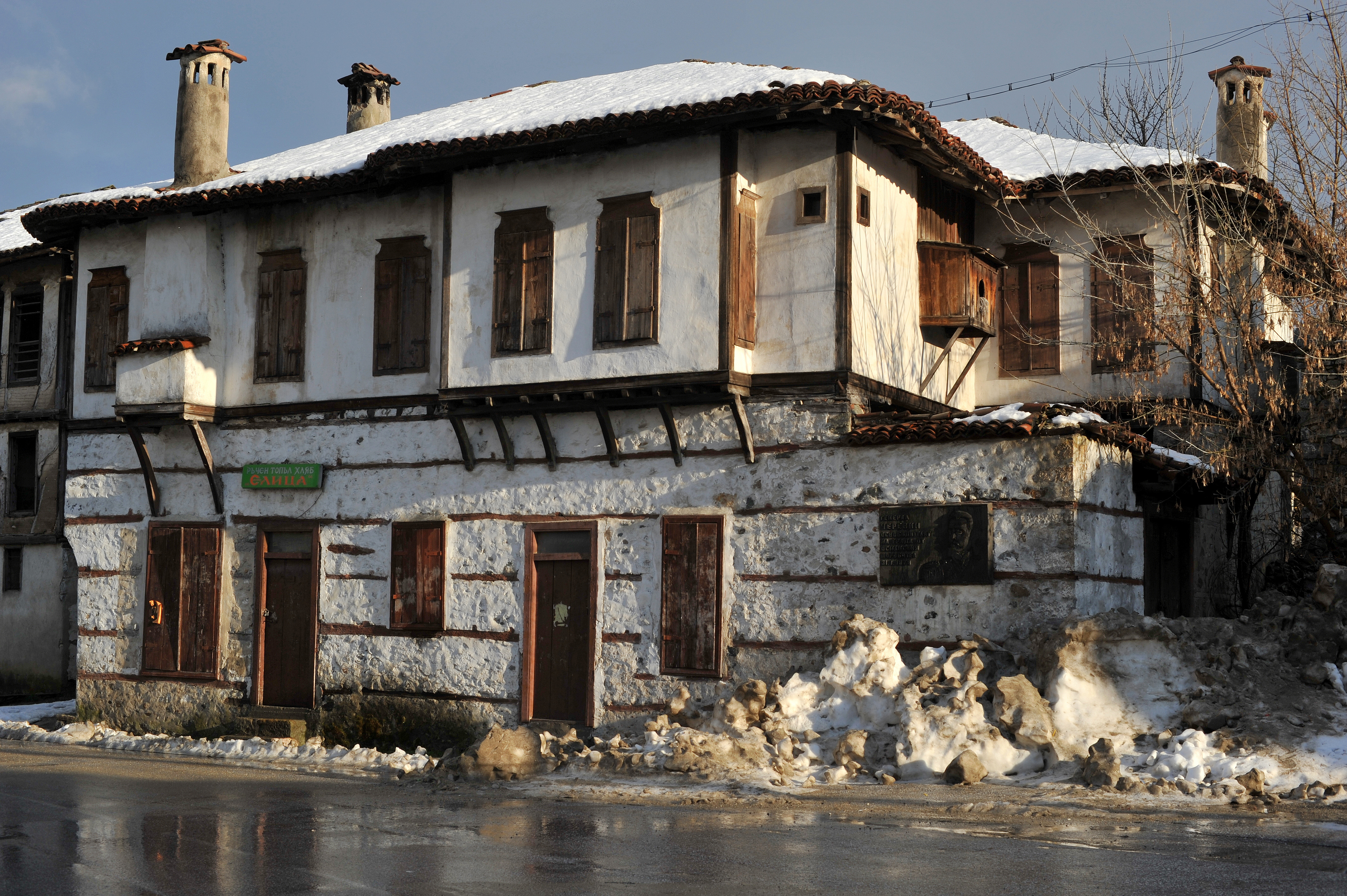
Traditional architecture - Zlatograd.

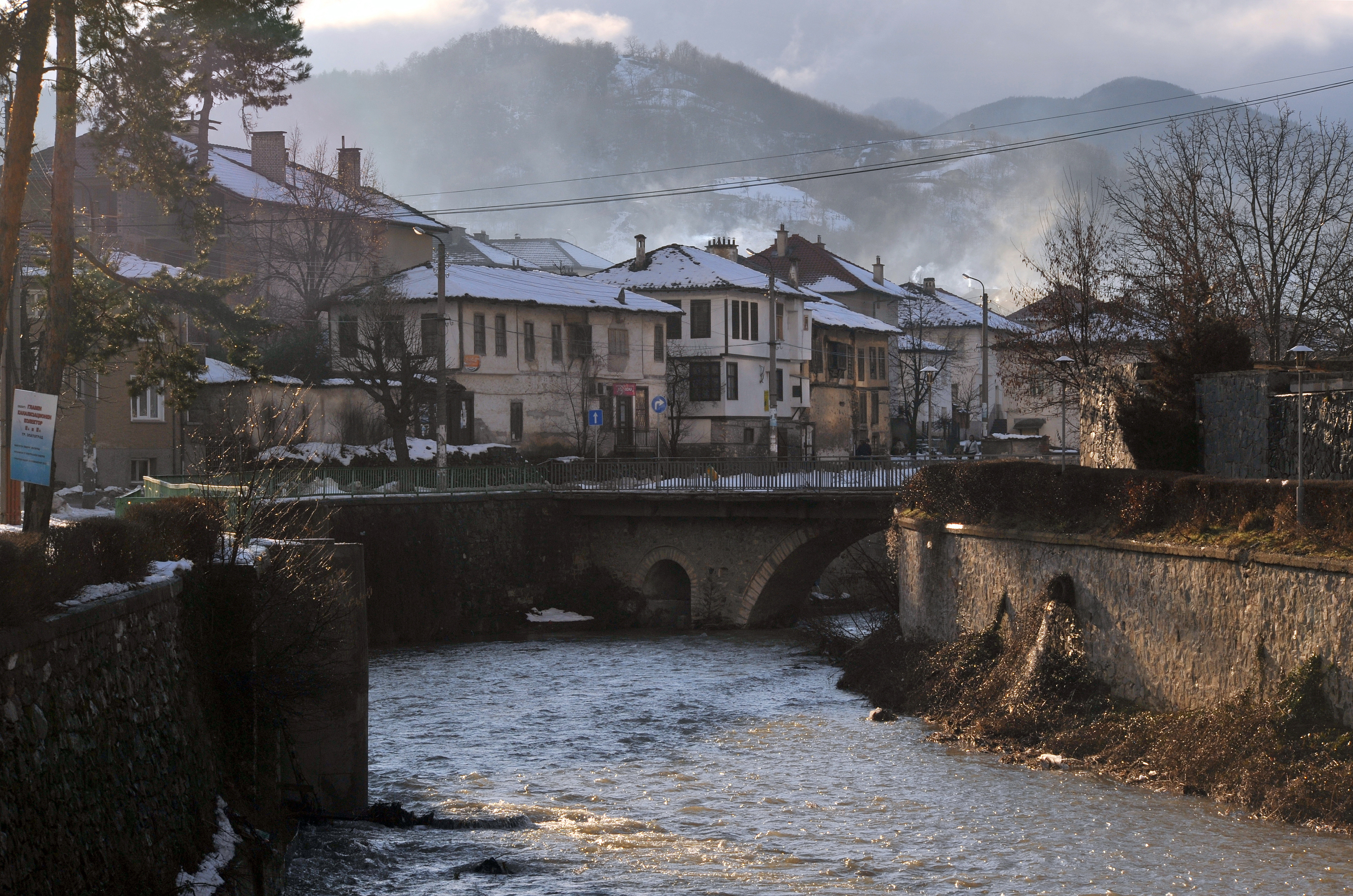
River - old town - Zlatograd.

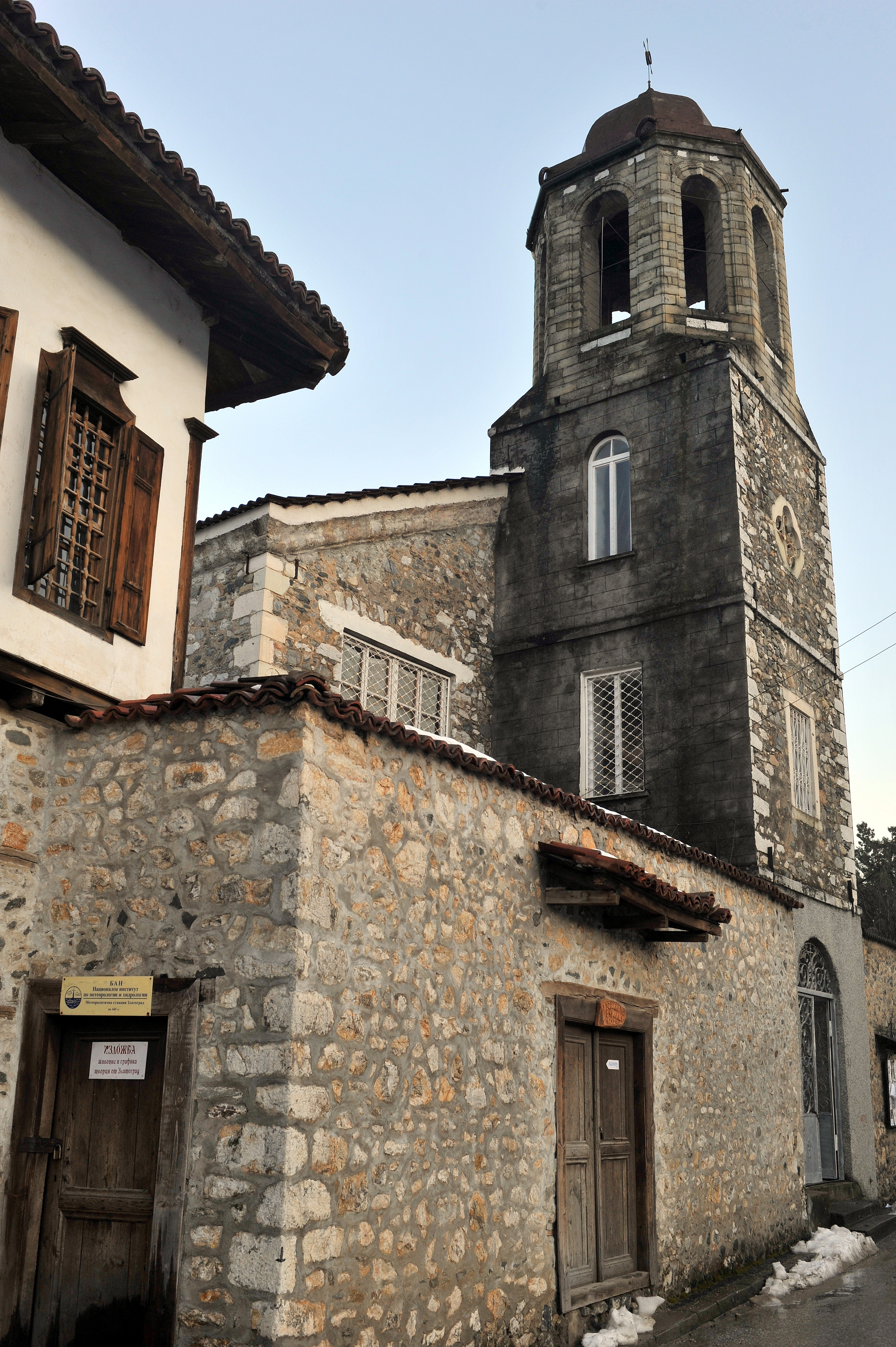
Orthodox church "Saint George" - Zlatograd.

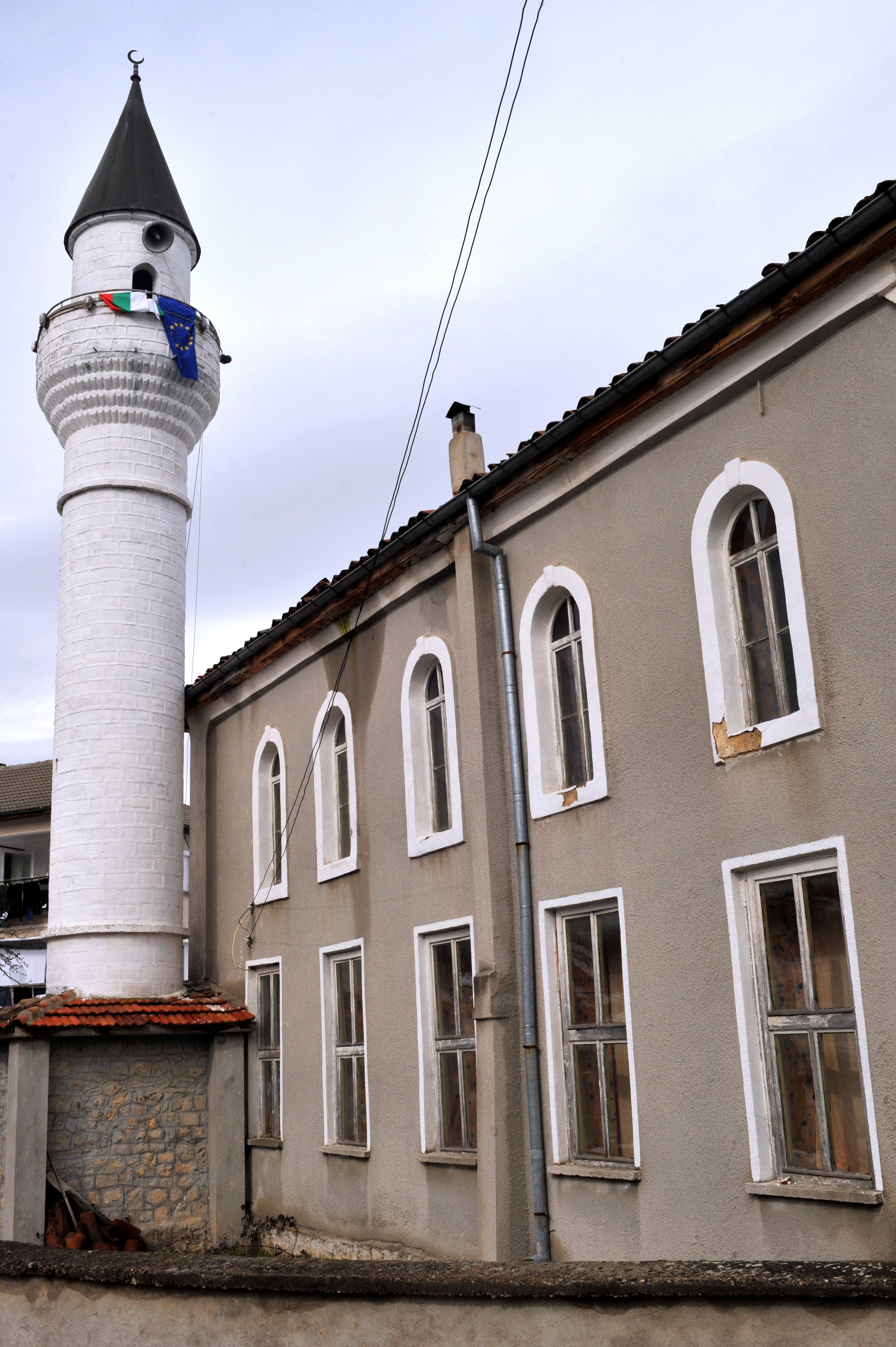
Mosque - Zlatograd.

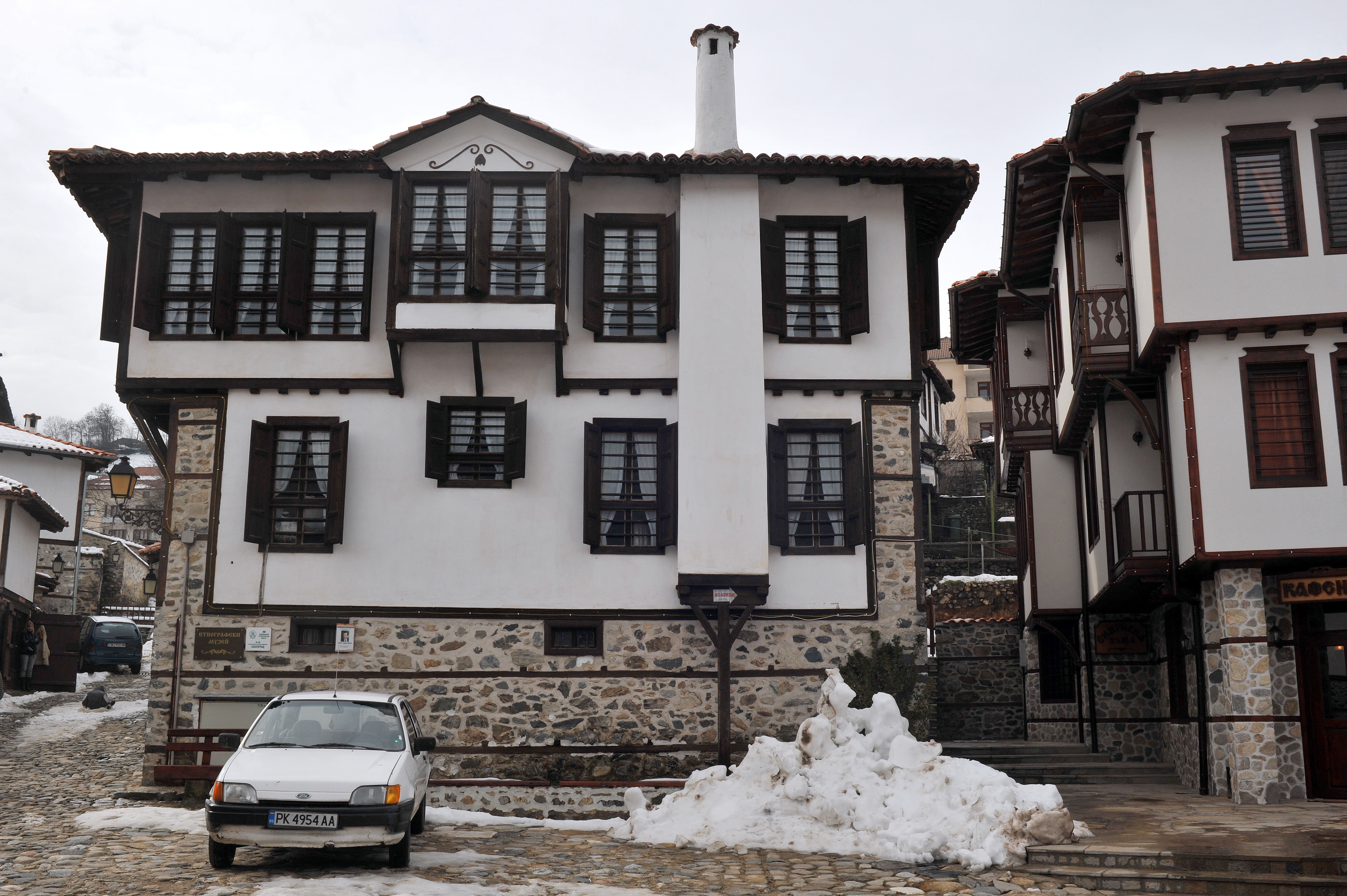
Ethnological complex - Zlatograd.

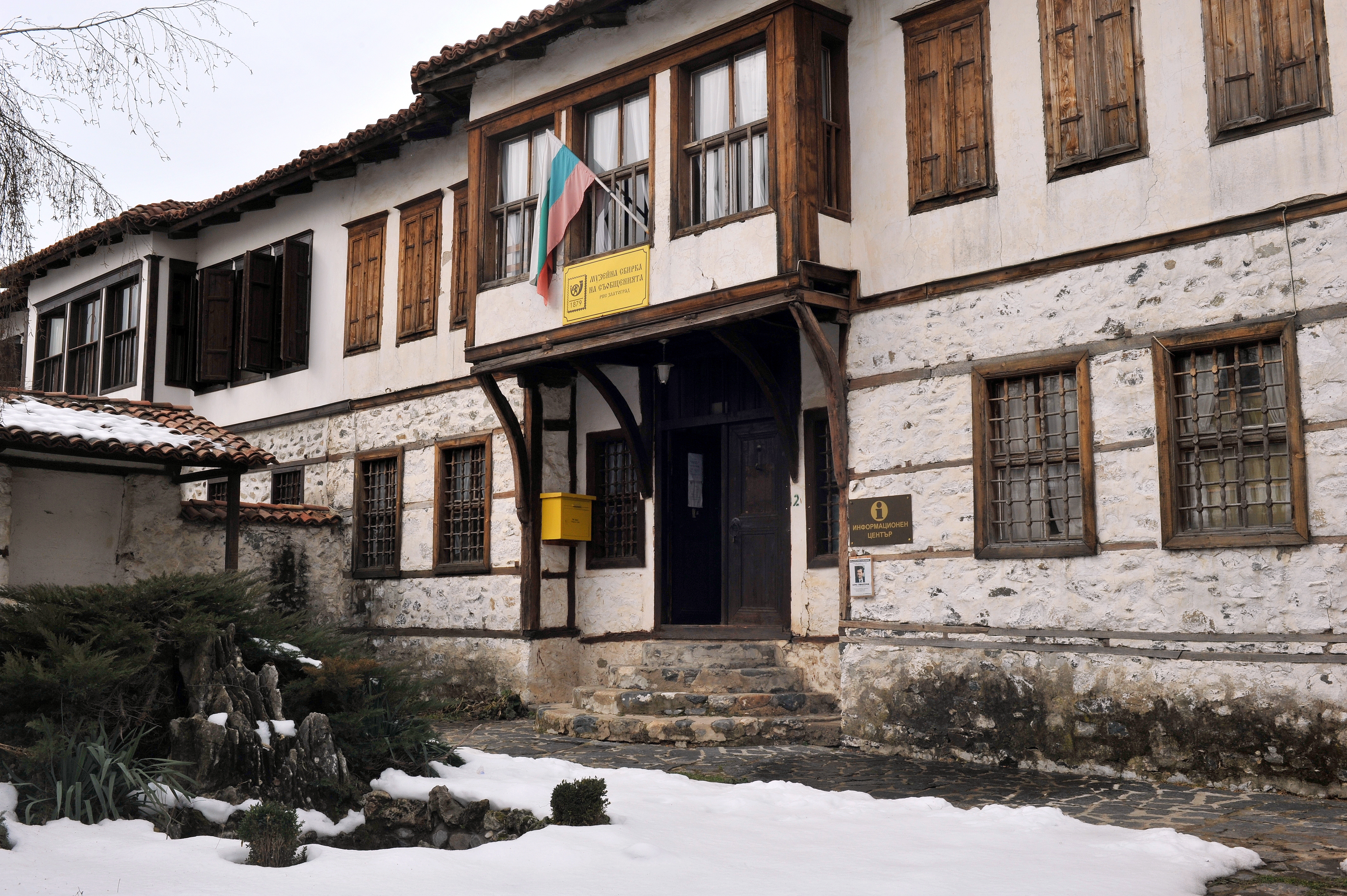
Ethnological complex - Zlatograd.

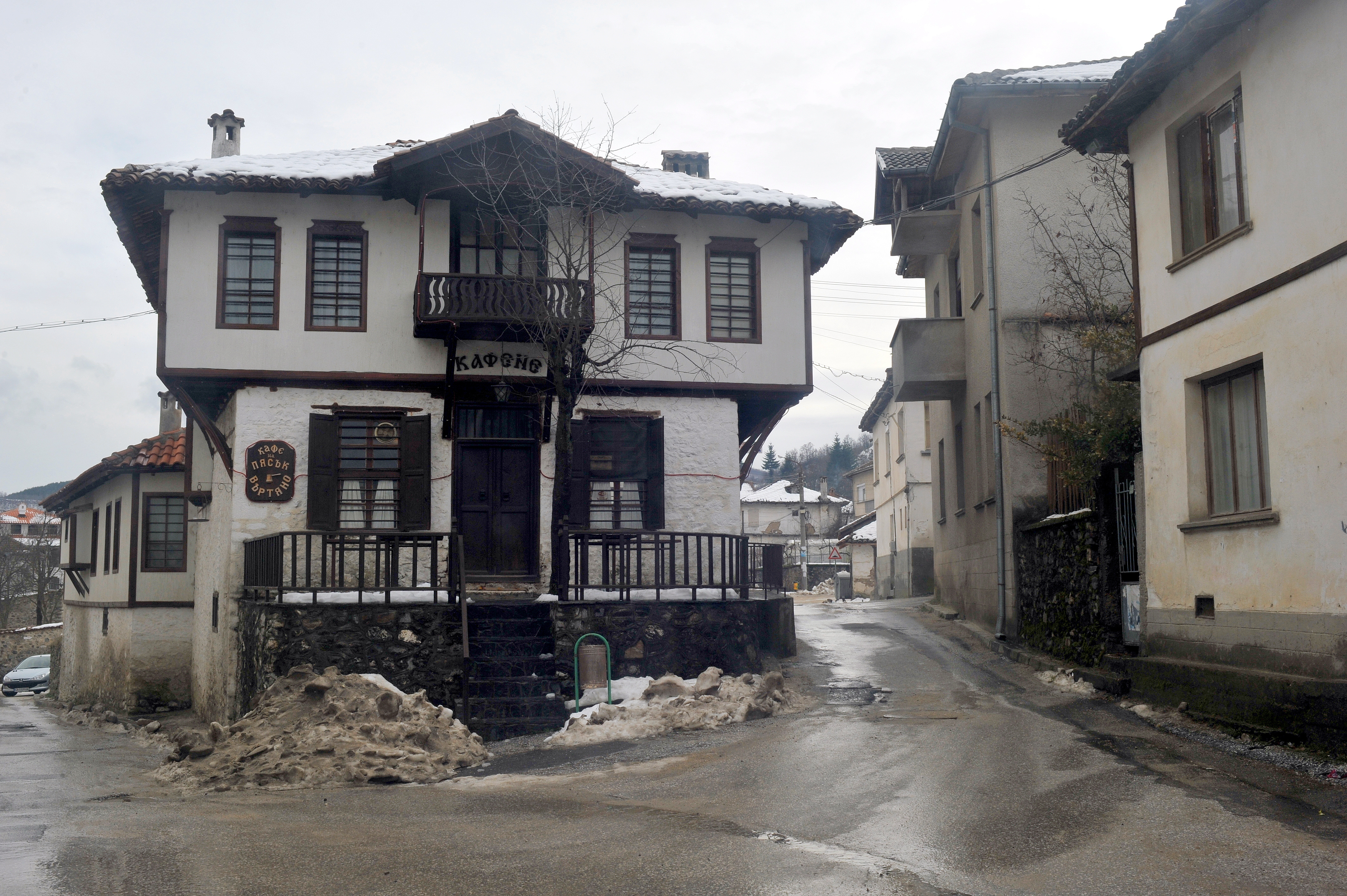
Ethnological complex - Zlatograd.
