= Sedlari, Bulgaria =

Sedlari Седлари
- Village
- Location within Bulgaria
- Coordinates: 41.5167°N 25.3833°E
- Country: Bulgaria
- Province: Kardzhali Province
- Municipality: Momchilgrad
- Elevation: 237 m (778 ft)

Population
  - Total: 188
- Time zone: UTC+2 (EET)
  - Summer (DST): UTC+3 (EEST)

Sedlari is a village in Momchilgrad Municipality, Kardzhali Province, in southern Bulgaria.
