= Kirkovo Municipality =

Kirkovo Municipality Община Кирково
- Municipality
- Location within Bulgaria
- Coordinates: 41°19′N 25°21′E
- Country: Bulgaria
- Province: Kardzhali
- Municipality: Kirkovo

Area
  - Total: 537.87 km^{2} (207.67 sq mi)

Population (1-Feb-2011)
  - Total: 22,280
  - Density: 41.42/km^{2} (107.3/sq mi)
- Time zone: UTC+2 (EET)
  - Summer (DST): UTC+3 (EEST)
- Website: www.kirkovo.bg

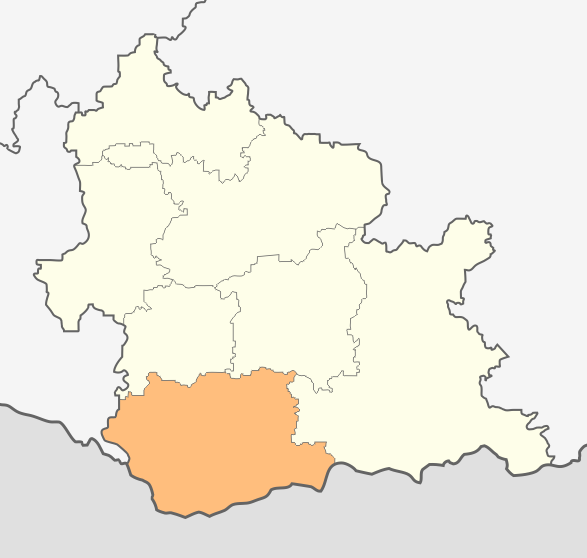
Kirkovo municipality within Kardzhali Province

Kirkovo Municipality is a municipality in Kardzhali Province, Bulgaria. The administrative centre is Kirkovo.

== Demography ==
=== Religion ===
According to the latest Bulgarian census of 2011, the religious composition, among those who answered the optional question on religious identification, was the following:

Religious composition of Kirkovo Municipality
Orthodox Christianity	6.2%
Catholicism	0.3%
Protestantism	0.1%
Islam	82.4%
No religion	1.7%
Prefer not to answer, others and indefinable	9.3%
