= Komotini railway station =

Railway station in Komotini, Greece

Κομοτηνή Komotini
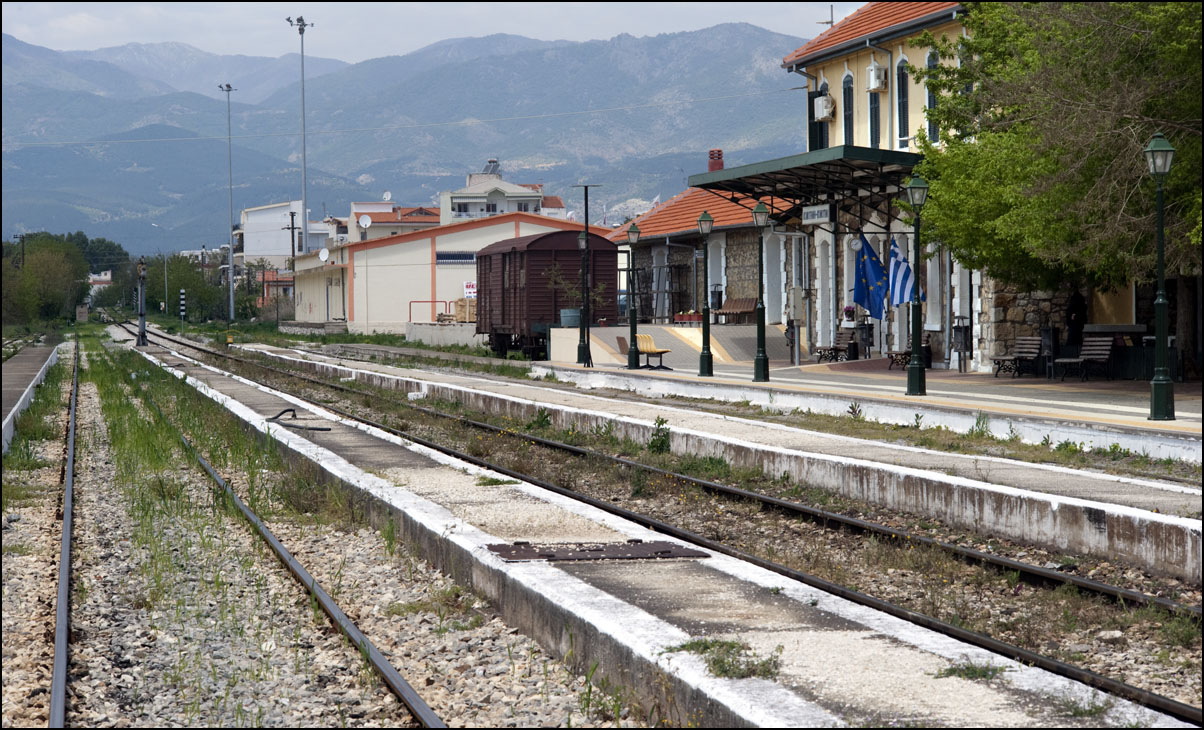
- Komotini railway station, April 2009

General information
- Location: Komotini 691 00; Rhodope; Greece
- Coordinates: 41°06′36″N 25°23′38″E
- Owner: GAIAOSE
- Line: Thessaloniki–Alexandroupolis railway
- Platforms: 2
- Tracks: 5 (1 mothballed)
- Train operators: Hellenic Train

Construction
- Structure type: At-grade
- Platform levels: 1
- Parking: Yes
- Cycle facilities: No

Other information
- Status: Staffed (peak-time only)
- Website: www.ose.gr/en

History
- Opened: 1900
- Electrified: No
Former services
| Preceding station | Hellenic Train | Following station |
|---|---|---|
| Xanthi towards Thessaloniki | InterCity Thessaloniki–Alexandroupoli Fast train | Sykorrachi towards Alexandroupoli |
| Polyanthos towards Thessaloniki | InterCity Thessaloniki–Alexandroupoli | Venna towards Alexandroupoli |
| Preceding station | Turkish State Railways | Following station |
| Xanthi towards Thessaloniki | Friendship Express | Alexandroupoli towards Istanbul |
Location
- Location within Greece

Komotini railway station (Greek: Σιδηροδρομικός Σταθμός Κομοτηνής, romanized: Sidirodromikós stathmós Komotinís) is a railway station that servers the city of Komotini, in Rhodope in East Macedonia and Thrace, Greece. The station is located 3 kilometres (1.9 mi) southeast of the city centre but within city limits. The station (as of 2019) is staffed, but only at peak times, but has waiting rooms and a bus stop in the forecourt.

== History ==
The station opened in 1900 on what was the Société du Chemin de Fer Ottoman Jonction Salonique-Constantinople JSC, build to connect Thessaloniki and Alexandroupoli. During this period, Northern Greece and the southern Balkans were still under Ottoman rule. Komotini was annexed by Greece on 18 October 1912 during the First Balkan War. From 1920, under the Greek administration, significant improvements were made, and the train crossed the land of Thrace and Eastern Macedonia, transporting passengers and goods safely and at low fares.

On 17 October 1925, The Greek government purchased the Greek sections of the former Salonica Monastir railway and the railway became part of the Hellenic State Railways, with the remaining section north of Florina seeded to Yugoslavia. In 1970 OSE became the legal successor to the SEK, taking over responsibilities for most of Greece's rail infrastructure. On 1 January 1971, the station and most of the Greek rail infrastructure were transferred to the Hellenic Railways Organisation S.A., a state-owned corporation. Freight traffic declined sharply when the state-imposed monopoly of OSE for the transport of agricultural products and fertilisers ended in the early 1990s. Many small stations of the network with little passenger traffic were closed down. On 9 September 2007, the station reopened. Since 2007, the station is served by the Proastiakos Thessaloniki services to New Railway Station. In 2009, with the Greek debt crisis unfolding OSE's Management was forced to reduce services across the network. Timetables were cut back, routes closed, and stations left abandoned as the government-run entity attempted to reduce overheads. Services from Thessaloniki and Alexandroupolis were cut back from six to just two trains a day, reducing the reliability of services and passenger numbers. In 2016 upgrade work on the line resulted in no stopping services between Drama and Xanthi. There is old abandoned boxcar shunted onto one of the sidetracks, very close to the station buildings. In 2017 OSE's passenger transport sector was privatised as TrainOSE, currently, a wholly owned subsidiary of Ferrovie dello Stato Italiane infrastructure, including stations, remained under the control of OSE. In July 2022, the station began being served by Hellenic Train, the rebranded TranOSE.

In August 2025, the Greek Ministry of Infrastructure and Transport confirmed the creation of a new body, Greek Railways (Greek: Σιδηρόδρομοι Ελλάδος, romanized: Ellinikí Sidiródromi Monoprósopi) to assume responsibility for rail infrastructure, planning, modernisation projects, and rolling stock across Greece. Previously, these functions were divided among several state-owned entities: OSE, which managed infrastructure; ERGOSÉ, responsible for modernisation projects; and GAIAOSÉ, which owned stations, buildings, and rolling stock. OSE had overseen both infrastructure and operations until its vertical separation in 2005. Rail safety has been identified as a key priority. The merger follows the July approval of a Parliamentary Bill to restructure the national railway system, a direct response to the Tempi accident of February 2023, in which 43 people died after a head-on collision.

== Facilities ==
The station has waiting rooms within the original brick-built station building. There Are two cafes/restaurants one in the station building, with a second within the station complex. The station is staffed, however, only during peak times.

== Services ==
It is served by only one long-distance trains between Thessaloniki and Alexandroupolis.

In January 2019, services between Komotini and Alexandroupolis were suspended after a local river burst its banks in the area near the village of Venna, and a rail replacement bus service was commenced.

Between July 2005 and February 2011, the Friendship Express, (an international InterCity train jointly operated by the Turkish State Railways (TCDD) and TrainOSE linking Istanbul's Sirkeci Terminal, Turkey and Thessaloniki, Greece) made scheduled stops at Komotini.
