= Xanthi Carnival =

Carnival in Xanthi City, Greece

- Logo of the Thracian Folk Festival Xanthi Carnival
- Genre: Carnival, Festival
- Frequency: Annual
- Location(s): Xanthi, Greece
- Coordinates: 41.139189°N 24.887929°E
- Years active: 59
- Founded: February 13, 1966
- Participants: 16,000 (2019)
- Budget: €130,000 (at least)
- Organised by: Culture Center of Xanthi Municipality
- Sponsors: Amstel, ERT3
- Website: Official website

Xanthi Carnival (or Carnival of Xanthi; Greek: Ξανθιώτικο Καρναβάλι) and Thracian Folk Festival is the biggest event of its kind in northern Greece and the second biggest in Greece, following the Patras Carnival. Ιt was founded in 1966, in a formal way. The event is held annually under the auspices of the Cultural Center of the Municipality of Xanthi.

== History ==
Until the 1950s, carnival events were being organised in Xanthi were mainly folklore-based, with traditional Thracian elements strongly promoted. That time, dance groups and cultural associations of the three prefectures of Thrace, and some of the neighbouring areas, were participating. In the mid-1960s, certain residents of the town of Xanthi, promoted the idea of folklore celebrations through the period of Carnival. In 1965 Stergios Stathis, a doctor from the city of Kastoria, who was practising Medicine in Xanthi that time, influenced by “Ragkoutsaria”, a traditional custom from his hometown, proposed the establishment of similar festivities. He gained support for his initiative by Vassilis Asimomitis, a theologian, originally from Mykonos, who taught at the Ecclesiastical School of Xanthi. He was aware of the traditions and customs of Thrace, many of them which were derived from mythological Cult of Dionysus. Their main goal was the creation of a festival during the Carnival season, that would revive the traditions and folkway of the wider area of Thrace.

Thus, in 1966, for the first time, were organised the Thracian Celebrations of Carnival. The events of 1966 and 1967 were organised by the Regional Committee of Tourism. Also, it is known that the first years, the neighbouring cities were craving to get the organisation of the Event at any cost in their city. This was never achieved, as the event managed to solidify in the town and the local chiefs and professionals did their best to maintain it.

From 1983 to 1986 the Festival was through critical times for its survival. The attendance of the people was already declined drastically and as a result it became insignificant, close to zero. Therefore, in 1986 the Mayor of that time, Konstantinos Benis, concerned about the future, assigned the organisation to Thracian Theatrical Scene, a local cultural association that was founded in 1975 and was quite popular. The association managed to revive and reshape the events with a plethora of changes and initiatives it took. In 1986 the first exclusively carnival association was formed called “Οι Φίλοι”. In 1987 more associations did as well and the term “Xanthi Carnival” was added to the official name. Thracian Theatrical Scene was the organiser until 1991. It is still nowadays active and participates in the Carnival.

In the 1990s new Festivals were created in the city like Xanthi Old Town Festival, Youth Festival and Manos Hatzidakis Festival and the emphasis to the folklore character of the Festival was somehow reduced.

== Associations ==
The associations participating in the Carnival of Xanthi are cultural clubs, based in the prefecture of Xanthi. Most of them join other festivals like Xanthi Old Town Festival and some of them organise events individually through the year. Every year each club creates its carnival costumes related to the theme of the Carnival and offers them to the public at a fee. Only carnivalists who manage to purchase a suit are allowed to march during the Grand Carnival Parade. After the parade; all clubs hold an outdoor party together at the finishing point.

== Schedule ==
The events begin approximately three weeks before the Great Lent with the Opening Ceremony. From that day a series of everyday happenings occur at the Central Square and at the Municipal Amphitheatre.

The firsts Saturday of the celebrations the Festival of the Folklore comes about. The Folklore Clubs begin from different points in the city, they march dancing and they gather up at the Central Square where they dance folk dances all together.

The day of Tsiknopempti, at the indoor sports center "Philippos Amiridis", is held the Evening of Traditional Tastes, where the folklore clubs of the city offer their local dishes, while there is a great feast with dances and music from various places of Greece. In the Municipal Amphitheater there are Folklore Nights, where Folklore Clubs dance traditional dances.

At the Central Square are held various cultural events and mainly concerts hosting some of the most popular Greek singers through the years. Some of the artists performed are:Eleonora Zouganeli, Onirama, Locomondo, Stavento, Despina Vandi, Peggy Zina, Koza Mostra, Giorgos Tsalikis, Giorgos Sampanis, Eleni Foureira, Goin' Through, Demy, Michalis Hatzigiannis etc.

A week before the Grand Parade, the Children Carnival Parade takes place with the participation of school students. At the evening of the last Saturday, the day before the Grand Parade, the Night Carnival Parade is being organised, which is essentially the prelude and an integral part of the culmination of the festivities. It is an open call for all the people and carnivalists, where they can join the free parade wearing even the old costumes of the Carnival. It ends up in the Central Square where a big party is set up. Later the party continues in the Old Town until the morning.

The next day the Grand Carnival Parade begins at the entrance of the city, where the chariots of the carnival clubs and the carnivalists who procured the new carnival costumes march. The parade ends at the old stadium of Xanthi F.C. after a 3 kilometres (1.9 mi) route and closes with an outdoor party till late.

== Closing ceremony ==
The Festival is closing with the Closing Ceremony and the custom of burning the "Tzaros" in the river of Kosynthos.

According to the inhabitants of Eastern Thrace, "Tzaros"(Jaros) or "Tzarous" was a man-made model, mounted on a pile of holly trees. According to folk tradition, on the last Sunday of Carnival, Tzaros was set on fire in the center of an altar, a square, or a hill, so as not to have fleas in the Summer. This custom was brought by the refugees from Samakov in Eastern Thrace and is revived every year by the inhabitants of the homonymous settlement, which is located near the bridge over the river Kosynthos. The name "Tzaros" came from the peculiar sound (j, j, j) that the burning of the bush created. A spectacular fireworks show completes the ceremony.

On Clean Monday, the event ends with the baton be passed to various villages of the prefecture of Xanthi, such as Stavroupoli, Polysitos and Avdira with local customs and activities.

== Carnival theme ==
Each year a different theme is chosen by the Cultural Center of the Municipality of Xanthi and based on this the clubs create carnival costumes. The Queen of Carnival is selected after competition and voting by the Clubs and the Cultural Center or by direct assignment from the Cultural Center. Sometimes the Queen comes from the area of Thrace, but other times is a popular celebrity in Greece.

- As of 2018, the Carnival of Xanthi, in addition to the established Queen, has a King, the "pirate" Panagiotis Georgiou. In addition, it was decided that the Queen would be accompanied by princesses.
- In 2016, for the first time, Oraiokastro of Thessaloniki participated in the Xanthi Carnival as a guest city, opening the Grand Parade. Since then, it has been participating for three consecutive years, and in 2020 Syvros Lefkada will be the guest city.

== See also ==
- Carnival in Greece
- Xanthi
