= Kirki railway station =

Railway station in Greece

Κίρκη Kirki

General information
- Location: Kirki, Alexandroupoli; Evros; Greece
- Coordinates: 40°58′32″N 25°47′52″E
- Owner: GAIAOSE
- Line: Thessaloniki–Alexandroupolis railway
- Train operators: Hellenic Train

Construction
- Structure type: at-grade

Other information
- Status: Unstaffed
- Website: http://www.ose.gr/en/

History
- Opened: 1896
- Electrified: No
Former/suspended services
| Preceding station | Hellenic Train | Following station |
|---|---|---|
| Sykorrachi towards Thessaloniki | InterCity Thessaloniki–Alexandroupoli | Alexandroupolis towards Alexandroupoli |
Location
- Location within Greece

Kirki railway station (Greek: Σιδηροδρομικός Σταθμός Κίρκη, romanized: Sidirodromikos Stathmos Kirki) is a railway station in the village Kirki, part of the municipality Alexandroupoli in Eastern Macedonia and Thrace, Greece. The station buildings are intact, but disused. The station stands 0.5 km (0.3 mi) from the village centre located within the village of Kirki. The journey from Kirki to Alexandroupli takes around 30 mins.

== History ==
In 2009, with the Greek debt crisis unfolding OSE's Management was forced to reduce services across the network. Timetables were cutback, and routes closed as the government-run entity attempted to reduce overheads; this included the Kozani–Amyntaio line. From 1 August 2009, the passenger services were reduced to only one train per day and the passenger services were withdrawn completely in 2010, as part of the reorganization of Trainose, and under the pretext that the line was considered unprofitable, depriving the prefecture of Kozani and the cities of Ptolemaida and Kozani of a rail connection. Indicatively, it was mentioned that the journey from Kozani to Thessaloniki took 3 hours with the IC 60/61 Pavlos Melas, while with the KTEL buses, via Egnatia Odos the journey took 1.5 hours). In August 2013, Proastiakos services where extended to Florina.

In 2017 OSE's passenger transport sector was privatised as TrainOSE, currently a wholly owned subsidiary of Ferrovie dello Stato Italiane infrastructure, including stations, remained under the control of OSE. In 2019 The Special Urban Development Study of the Kozani Railway Station was approved. however passenger services have yet to recommence. In July 2022, the station began being served by Hellenic Train, the rebranded TranOSE. Infrequent freight trains still use the Kozani line to reach the PPC power-generating stations.

In August 2025, the Greek Ministry of Infrastructure and Transport confirmed the creation of a new body, Greek Railways (Greek: Σιδηρόδρομοι Ελλάδος, romanized: Ellinikí Sidiródromi Monoprósopi) to assume responsibility for rail infrastructure, planning, modernisation projects, and rolling stock across Greece. Previously, these functions were divided among several state-owned entities: OSE, which managed infrastructure; ERGOSÉ, responsible for modernisation projects; and GAIAOSÉ, which owned stations, buildings, and rolling stock. OSE had overseen both infrastructure and operations until its vertical separation in 2005. Rail safety has been identified as a key priority. The merger follows the July approval of a Parliamentary Bill to restructure the national railway system, a direct response to the Tempi accident of February 2023, in which 43 people died after a head-on collision.

== Facilities ==
The station is still housed in the original 19th-century brick-built station building; however, the buildings are rundown and abandoned. As of (2020) the station is unstaffed, with no staffed booking office or waiting rooms. There is no footbridge over the lines, though passengers can walk across the rails, it is, however, not wheelchair accessible. The station has no toilet facilities; as a result, the station is currently little more than an unstaffed halt.

== Services ==
The station is served by around one train per day, to/from Alexandroupoli and Thessaloniki.
