= Xanthi railway station =

Railway Station

Ξάνθη Xànthi
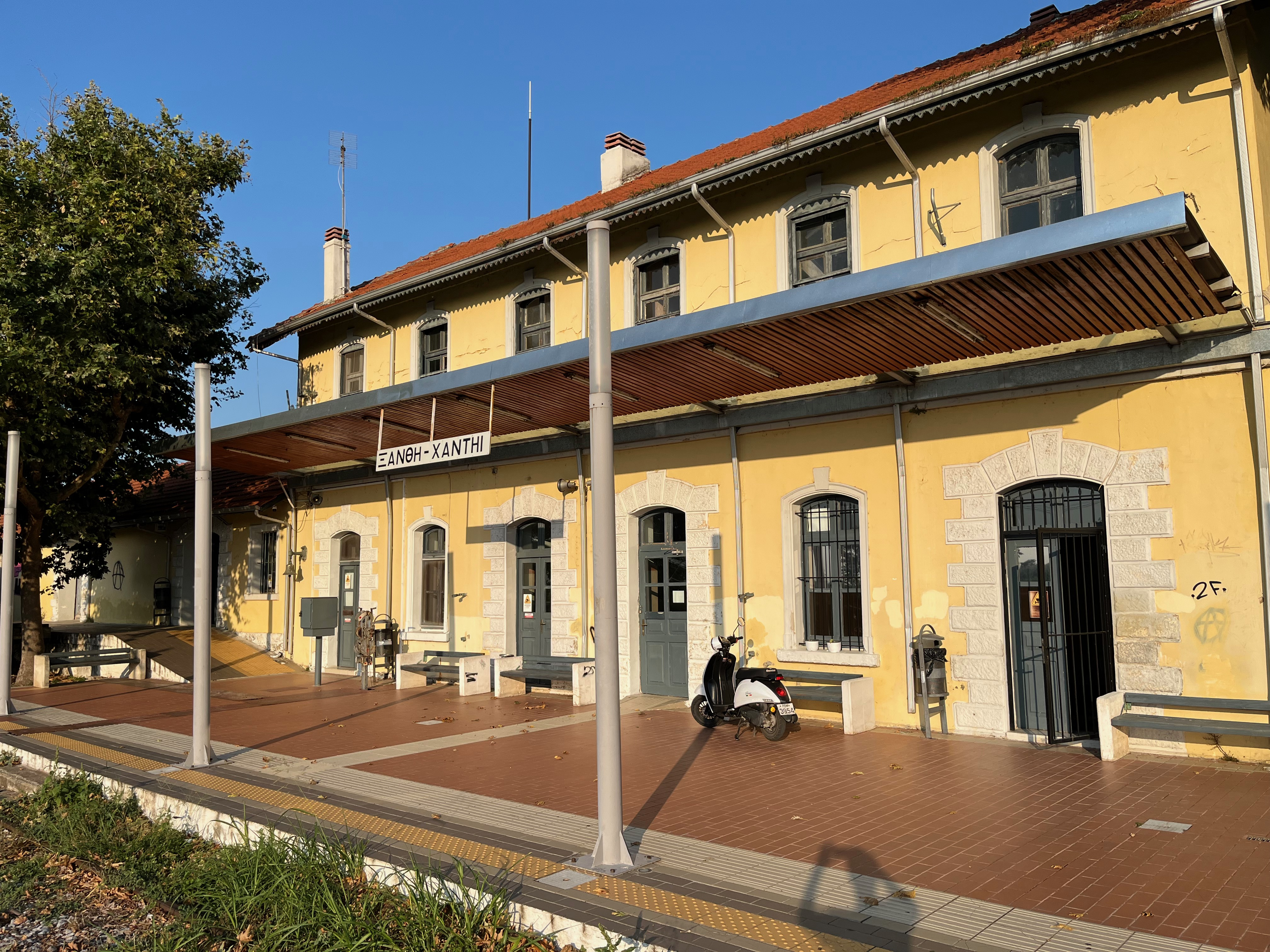
- Xanthi station building, July 2022

General information
- Location: 67100 Xanthi; Xanthi; Greece
- Coordinates: 41°07′26″N 24°53′33″E
- Owner: GAIAOSE
- Line: Thessaloniki–Alexandroupolis railway
- Platforms: 2
- Tracks: 7 (1 mothballed)
- Train operators: Hellenic Train

Construction
- Structure type: at-grade
- Platform levels: 1
- Parking: Yes
- Cycle facilities: No

Other information
- Status: Staffed (Peaktime only)
- Website: http://www.ose.gr/en/

History
- Opened: 1900
- Electrified: No

Services
Preceding station	Hellenic Train	Following station
Toxotes towards Thessaloniki	InterCity Thessaloniki–Alexandroupoli Fast train	Komotini towards Alexandroupoli
Toxotes towards Thessaloniki	InterCity Thessaloniki–Alexandroupoli	Polysito towards Alexandroupoli

Former service
Preceding station	Turkish State Railways	Following station
Drama towards Thessaloniki	Friendship Express	Komotini towards Istanbul
Location
- Location within Greece

Xanthi railway station (Greek: Σιδηροδρομικός Σταθμός Ξάνθης, romanized: Sidirodromikós stathmós Xànthi) is a railway station that servers the city of Xanthi, in Xanthi in East Macedonia and Thrace, Greece. The station is located 3 kilometres (1.9 mi) southwest of the city centre, but still within the city limits. The station (as of 2019) is staffed, but only at peak times, but has waiting rooms and a taxi rank.

== History ==
The station opened in 1900. Xanthi was annexed by Greece on 18 October 1912 during the First Balkan War. On 17 October 1925, The Greek government purchased the Greek sections of the former Salonica Monastir railway, and the railway became part of the Hellenic State Railways, with the remaining section north of Florina ceded to Yugoslavia. In 1970, OSE became the legal successor to the SEK, taking over responsibilities for most of Greece's rail infrastructure. On 1 January 1971, the station and most of the Greek rail infrastructure were transferred to the Hellenic Railways Organisation S.A., a state-owned corporation. Freight traffic declined sharply when the state-imposed monopoly of OSE for the transport of agricultural products and fertilisers ended in the early 1990s. Many small stations of the network with little passenger traffic were closed down. On 9 September 2007, the station reopened. Since 2007, the station is served by the Proastiakos Thessaloniki services to New Railway Station. In 2009, with the Greek debt crisis unfolding OSE's Management was forced to reduce services across the network. Timetables were cut back, routes closed, and stations left abandoned as the government-run entity attempted to reduce overheads. Services from Thessaloniki and Alexandroupolis were cut back from six to just two trains a day, reducing the reliability of services and passenger numbers. In 2016 upgrade work on the line resulted in no stopping services between Drama and Xanthi. There is old abandoned boxcar shunted onto one of the sidetracks, very close to the station buildings. In 2017 OSE's passenger transport sector was privatised as TrainOSE, currently, a wholly owned subsidiary of Ferrovie dello Stato Italiane infrastructure, including stations, remained under the control of OSE. In July 2022, the station began being served by Hellenic Train, the rebranded TranOSE

In August 2025, the Greek Ministry of Infrastructure and Transport confirmed the creation of a new body, Greek Railways (Greek: Σιδηρόδρομοι Ελλάδος, romanized: Ellinikí Sidiródromi Monoprósopi) to assume responsibility for rail infrastructure, planning, modernisation projects, and rolling stock across Greece. Previously, these functions were divided among several state-owned entities: OSE, which managed infrastructure; ERGOSÉ, responsible for modernisation projects; and GAIAOSÉ, which owned stations, buildings, and rolling stock. OSE had overseen both infrastructure and operations until its vertical separation in 2005. Rail safety has been identified as a key priority. The merger follows the July approval of a Parliamentary Bill to restructure the national railway system, a direct response to the Tempi accident of February 2023, in which 43 people died after a head-on collision.

== Facilities ==
The station has waiting rooms within the original brick-built station building. There is a cafe-ouzerie next door. The station is staffed only at peak times.

== Services ==
On 25 September 2016, as part of the planned upgrade ‘reorganization’ of the rail network, the Drama-Xanthi rail link was suspended. The planned interruption was scheduled to take 6 to 9 months. However, between 2018 and 2022, passenger traffic between Drama and Alexandroupoli was completely shut down. As of September 2022, trains are running again on weekdays between Xanthi and Alexandroupoli, but this service ended already in February 2023.

Between July 2005 and February 2011, the Friendship Express, (an international InterCity train jointly operated by the Turkish State Railways (TCDD) and TrainOSE linking Istanbul's Sirkeci Terminal, Turkey and Thessaloniki, Greece) made scheduled stops at Xanthi.
