= Sykorrachi railway station =

Railway station in Greece

Συκορράχη Sykorrachi

General information
- Location: Sikorrachi 693 00; Evros; Greece
- Coordinates: 40.9743493°N 25.7202766°E
- Owner: GAIAOSE
- Line: Thessaloniki–Alexandroupolis railway
- Platforms: 1 side platform
- Tracks: 1
- Train operators: TrainOSE

Construction
- Structure type: at-grade
- Platform levels: 1
- Parking: No
- Cycle facilities: No

Other information
- Status: Unstaffed
- Website: http://www.ose.gr/en/

History
- Electrified: No
Former services
Preceding station	Hellenic Train	Following station
Komotini towards Thessaloniki	InterCity Thessaloniki–Alexandroupoli Fast train	Kirki towards Alexandroupoli
Mesti towards Thessaloniki	InterCity Thessaloniki–Alexandroupoli	Kirki towards Alexandroupoli
Location
- Location within Greece

Sikorrachi railway stop (Greek: Σιδηροδρομική Στάση Συκορράχη, romanized: Sidirodromiki Stasi Sykorrachi) is a railway stop that serves the village of Sykorrachi in Eastern Macedonia and Thrace, Greece. Located in the centre of the village, The journey from Sikorrachi to Alexandroupli takes around 37 mins.

== History ==
In 2001 the infrastructure element of OSE was created, known as GAIAOSE; it would henceforth be responsible for the maintenance of stations, bridges and other elements of the network, as well as the leasing and the sale of railway assists. In 2003, OSE launched "Proastiakos SA", as a subsidiary to serve the operation of the suburban network in the urban complex of Athens during the 2004 Olympic Games. In 2005, TrainOSE was created as a brand within OSE to concentrate on rail services and passenger interface.

In 2009, with the Greek debt crisis unfolding OSE's Management was forced to reduce services across the network. Timetables were cut back, and routes closed as the government-run entity attempted to reduce overheads. In 2011 it was reported that the Greek government was looking at divestiture of certain high-profile assets of OSE, namely a number of the larger terminal stations, most notably Athens, Piraeus, Thessaloniki, Volos and also Larissa. In 2017 OSE's passenger transport sector was privatised as TrainOSE, (Now Hellenic Train) a wholly owned subsidiary of Ferrovie dello Stato Italiane. Infrastructure, including stations, remained under the control of OSE.

In August 2025, the Greek Ministry of Infrastructure and Transport confirmed the creation of a new body, Greek Railways (Greek: Σιδηρόδρομοι Ελλάδος, romanized: Ellinikí Sidiródromi Monoprósopi) to assume responsibility for rail infrastructure, planning, modernisation projects, and rolling stock across Greece. Previously, these functions were divided among several state-owned entities: OSE, which managed infrastructure; ERGOSÉ, responsible for modernisation projects; and GAIAOSÉ, which owned stations, buildings, and rolling stock. OSE had overseen both infrastructure and operations until its vertical separation in 2005. Rail safety has been identified as a key priority. The merger follows the July approval of a Parliamentary Bill to restructure the national railway system, a direct response to the Tempi accident of February 2023, in which 43 people died after a head-on collision.

== Facilities ==
The stop is equipped solely with a stone-built waiting room on the single platform. There are however two automatic level-crossings on either side of the station, installed by Bombardier. There is also a small restaurant across the road from the stop. The unstaffed halt has however been the victim of graffiti and vandalism but has since been repaired.

== Services ==
As of 2020 the stop is served by one train per day, to/from Alexandroupoli and Thessaloniki.

== Stop layout ==
Ground level		Exit
Level; Ε1	Side platform, doors will open on the right/left
Level; Ε1	Platform 1Α	towards Alexandroupoli (Kirki) →
Level; Ε1	Platform 1Β	towards Thessaloniki (Mesti) ←
