= Xanthi =

City in Greece

Xanthi Ξάνθη (Greek)
- Municipality
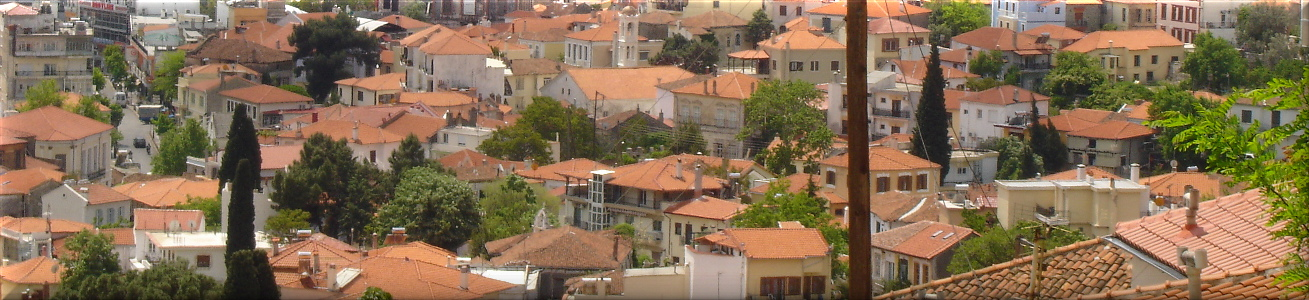
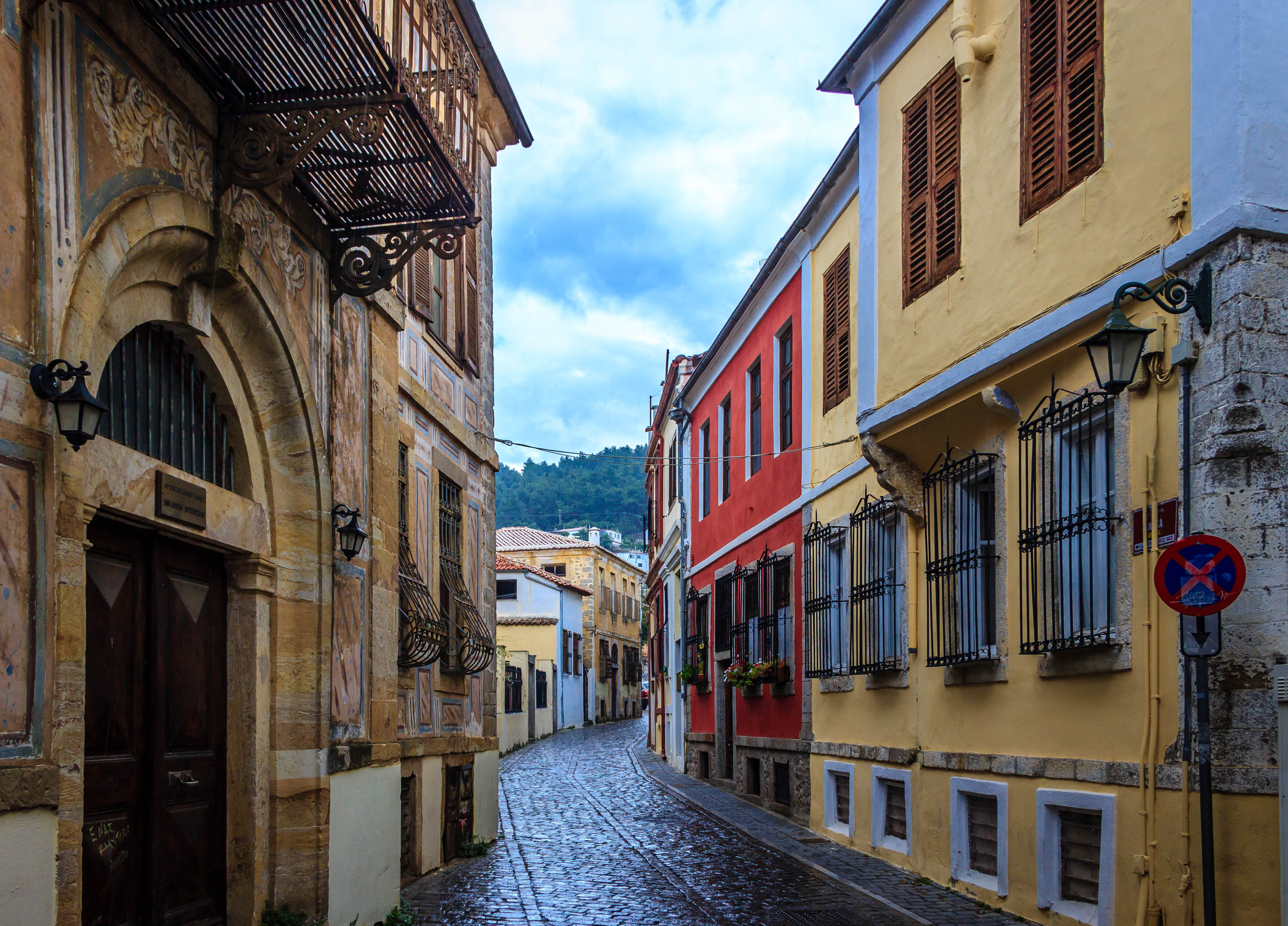
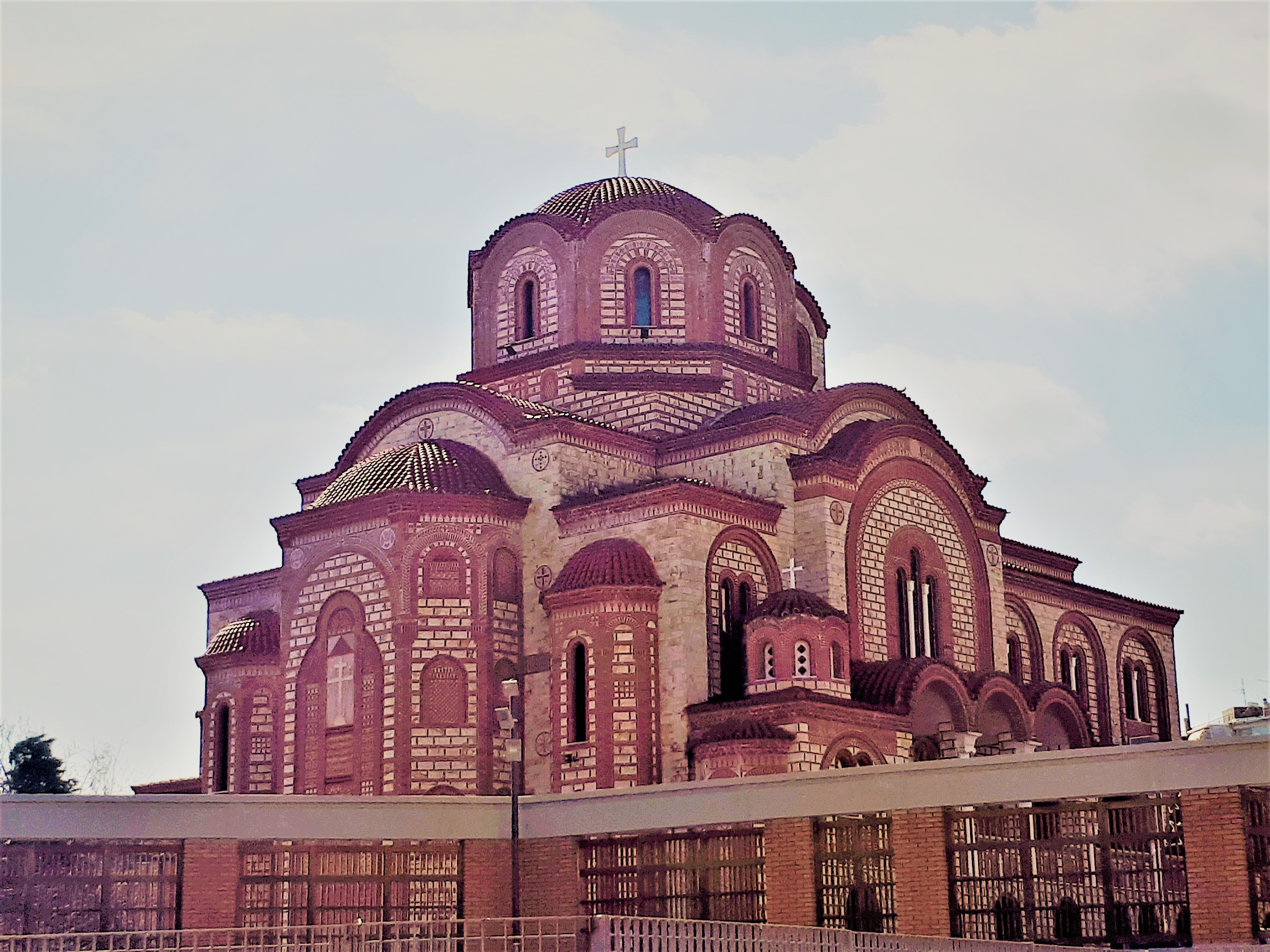
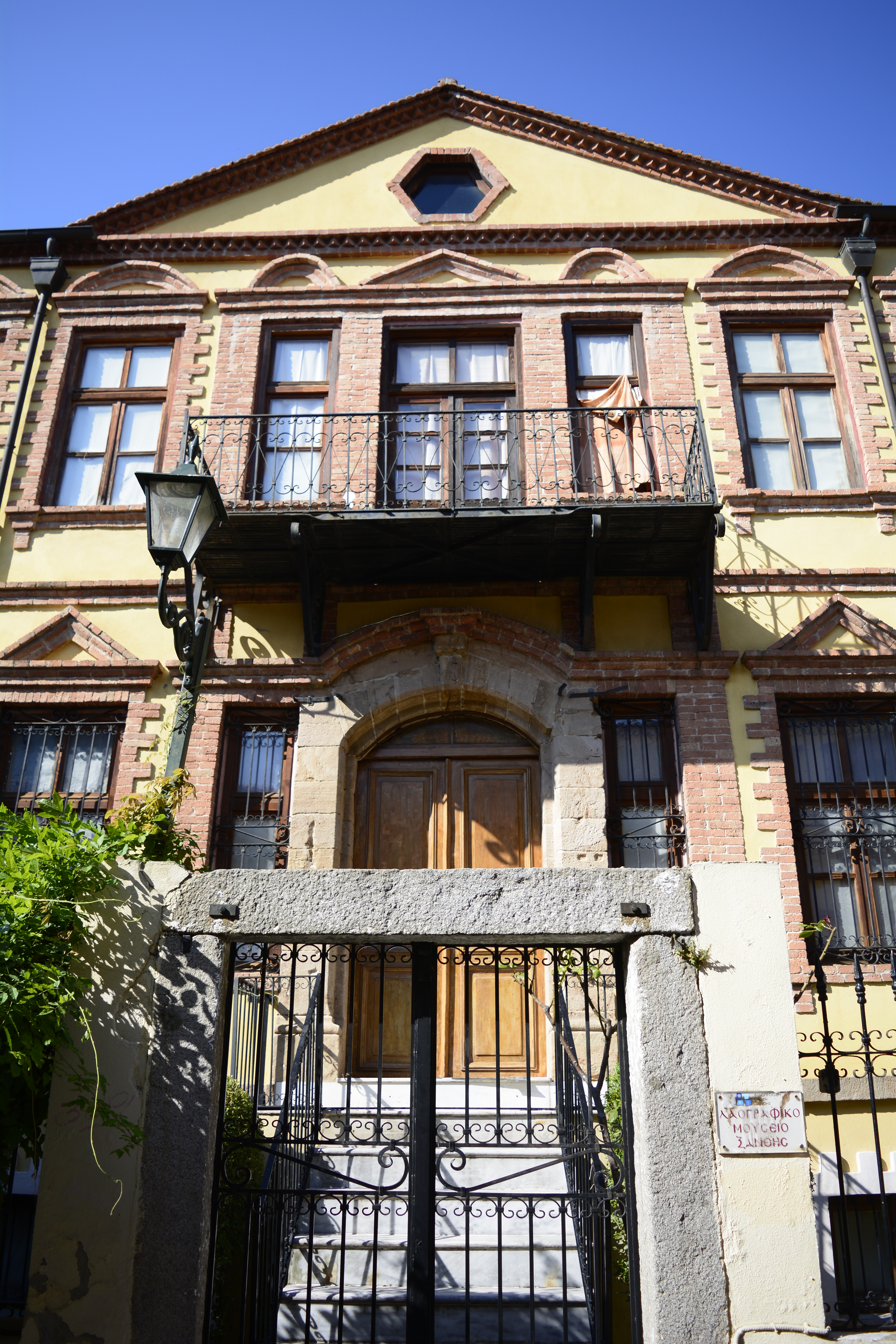
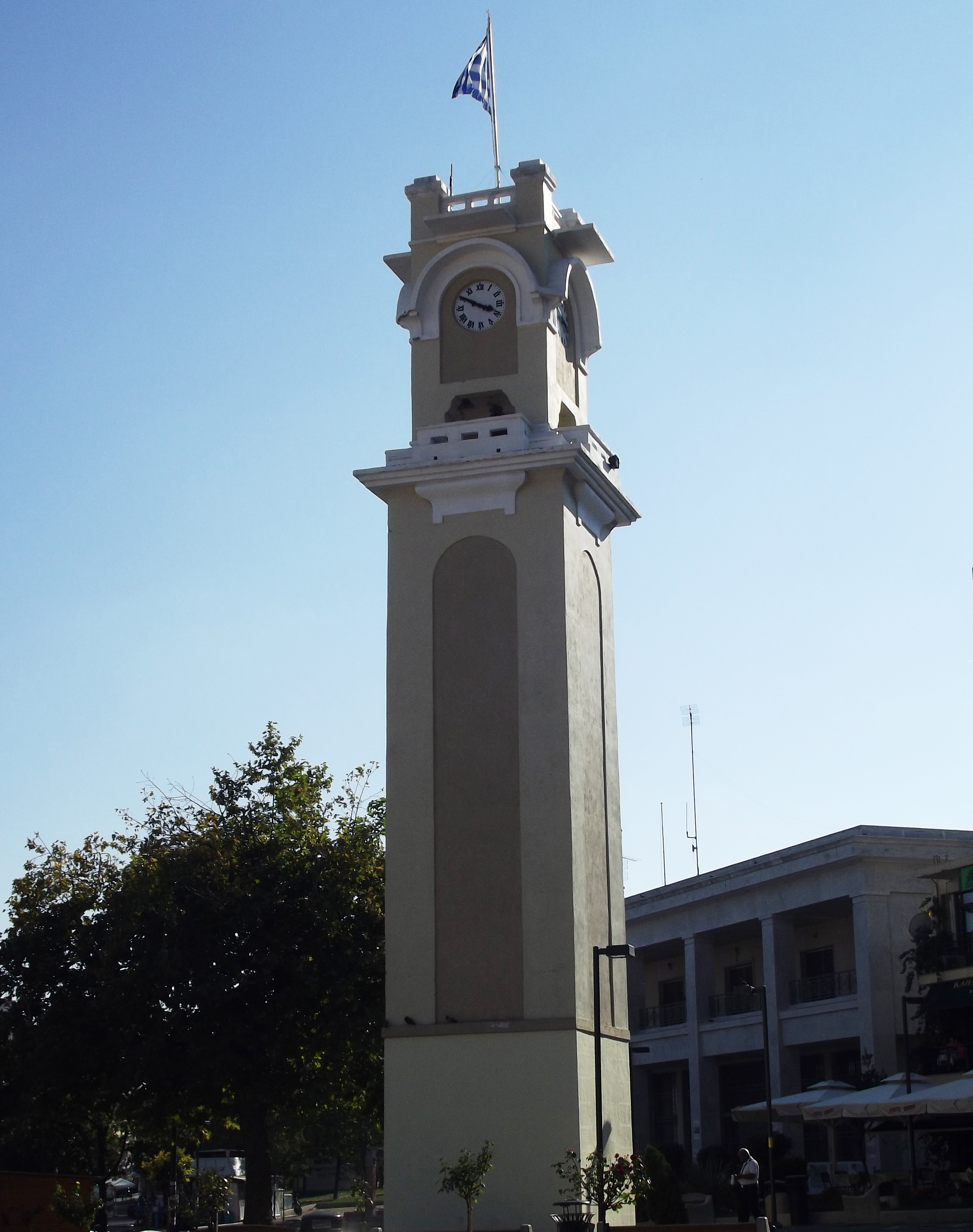
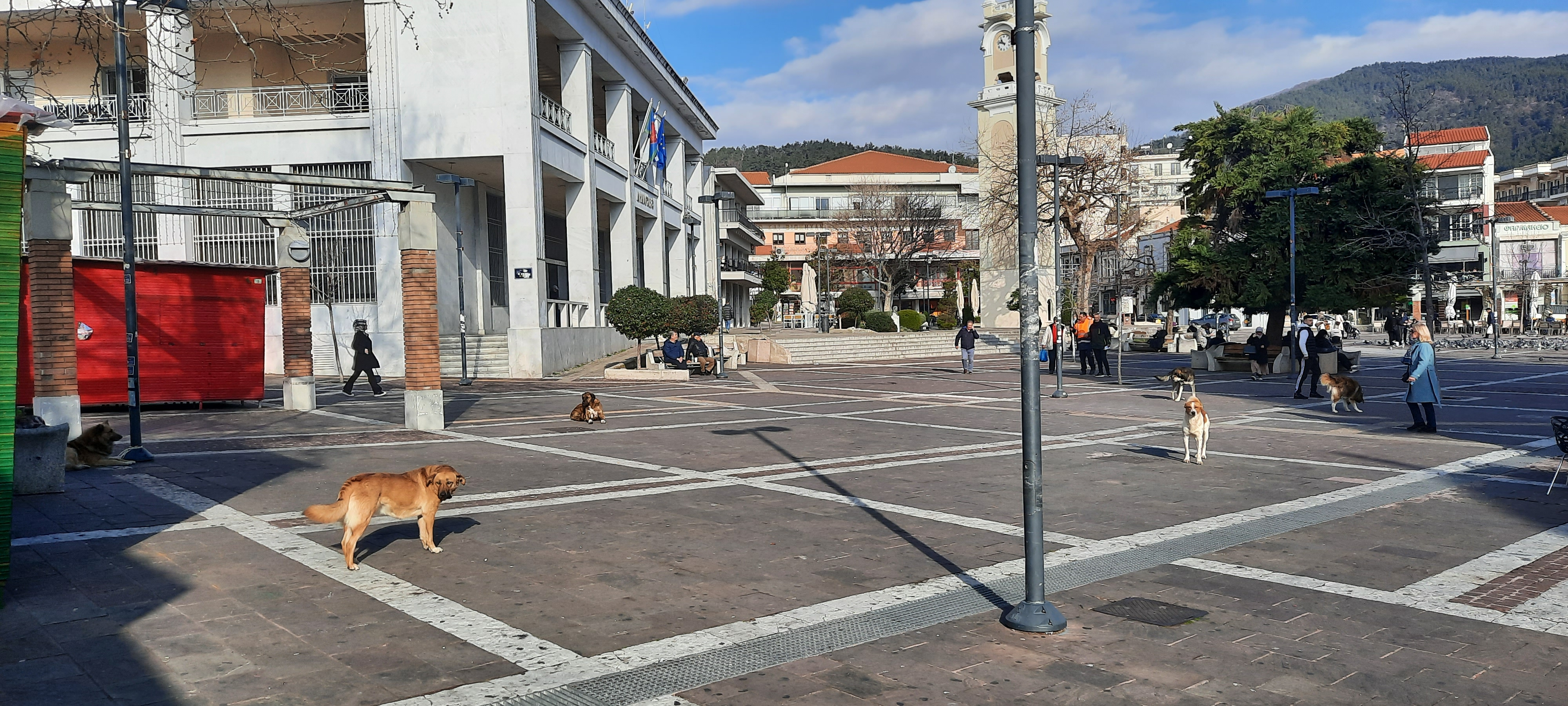
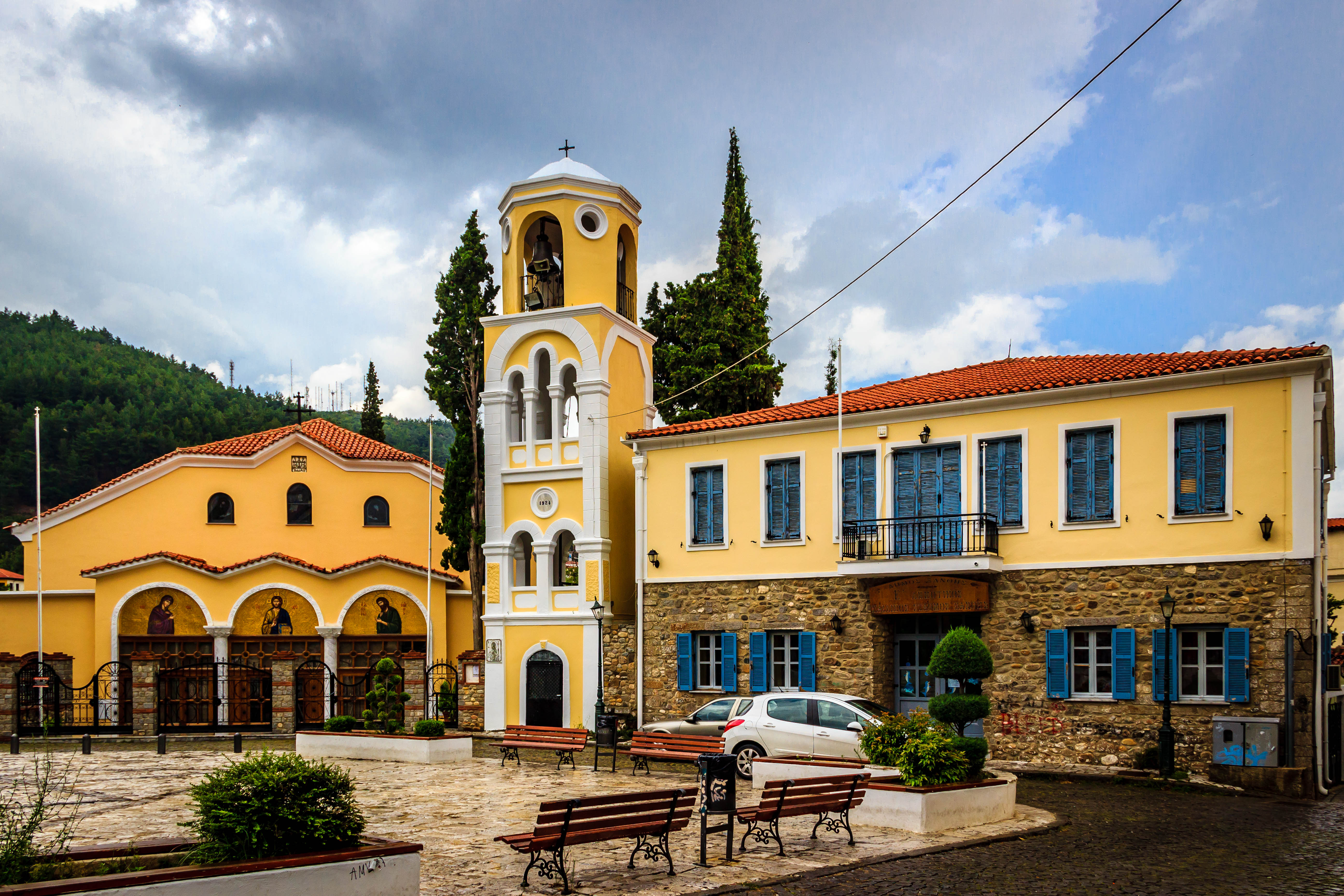
- From top left: aerial view of the city, Xanthi old town, Cathedral of St. Sophia The Wisdom of God, folk and history museum, Xanthi clocktower, Central square, a church in the old town.

- Location within the region

- Location within Greece
- Coordinates: 41°8′N 24°53′E
- Country: Greece
- Geographic region: Thrace
- Administrative region: Eastern Macedonia and Thrace
- Regional unit: Xanthi

Government
  - Mayor: Efstratios Kontos (since 2023)

Area
  - Municipality: 495.1 km^{2} (191.2 sq mi)
  - Municipal unit: 153.1 km^{2} (59.1 sq mi)
- Elevation: 82 m (269 ft)

Population (2021)
  - Municipality: 66,875
  - Density: 135.1/km^{2} (349.8/sq mi)
  - Municipal unit: 65,240
  - Municipal unit density: 426.1/km^{2} (1,104/sq mi)
  - Community: 58,760
- Time zone: UTC+2 (EET)
  - Summer (DST): UTC+3 (EEST)
- Postal code: 67100, 67131, 67132, 67132
- Area code: 2541
- Vehicle registration: AH
- Website: www.cityofxanthi.gr

Xanthi (Greek: Ξάνθη, Xánthi [ˈksanθi]) is a city in the region of East Macedonia and Thrace, northeastern Greece. It is the capital of the Xanthi regional unit of the region of East Macedonia and Thrace.

Amphitheatrically built on the foot of the Rhodope Mountains, the city is divided by the Kosynthos River, into the west part, where the old and the modern town are located, and the east part that boasts a rich natural environment. The old part of town ("Palia Poli") is known throughout Greece for its distinctive architecture, combining many Byzantine Greek churches with neoclassical mansions of Greek merchants from the 18th and 19th centuries and Ottoman-Era mosques. Other landmarks in Xanthi include the Archaeological Museum of Abdera and the Folklore and Historical Museum. Because of the beauty that characterizes both the city and the wider region, Xanthi is often called "the Lady and Noblewoman of Thrace",

Xanthi is famous throughout Greece (especially Macedonia and Thrace) for its annual spring carnival (Greek: καρναβάλι) which has a significant role in the city's economy. Over 40 cultural associations from around Greece participate in the carnival program. The festivities which take place during the period include concerts, theatre plays, music and dance nights, exhibitions, a cycling event, games on the streets, and re-enactments of old customs.

== Name ==
There are two theories regarding the origin of its name: it was either named after a daughter of Oceanus and Tethys, or after Xanthi, one of the Amazons that ruled the region, according to legend.

Xanthi is known as İskeçe in Turkish and Скеча (Skecha) or Ксанти (Ksanti) in Bulgarian.

== History ==
Xanthi is sometimes identified with the ancient city of Xantheia mentioned in the 1st century BC by the geographer Strabo, but it was not mentioned by any other ancient historian. It began as a small village and experienced all the tumultuous periods of the history of Thrace, such as raids, disasters, ethnic conflicts, civil wars. The population of the region of Xanthi had dwindled down to almost nothing, as the region was depopulated in the 3rd century AD and almost everything had been destroyed when the Ottomans conquered the region in 1361. For this reason, the Ottomans brought Turkish settlers from within of Asia Minor, which is how Genisea (Γενισέα) was created, while Oraio (Ωραίο) and Xanthi remained mainly Greek and Christian centres.

=== Middle Ages ===
Known references to Xanthi (Ξάνθη), or Xanthia (Ξάνθεια), the city's origins are obscure; it was a prosperous stronghold of the Byzantine era but latter became a colony of the Ottomans known as Eskije. Xanthi is first recorded in 879 (Bishop Georgios of Xantheia is reported as taking part in the Fourth Council of Constantinople). From the 13th to the 14th century it was the most important city of the region. Two monasteries date from the Middle Ages: Pammegiston Taxiarchon, and Panagia Archangeliotisa, although written records indicate several others now lost. Xanthi featured in the campaign of Andronikos II Palaiologos in 1327.

=== Early modern ===
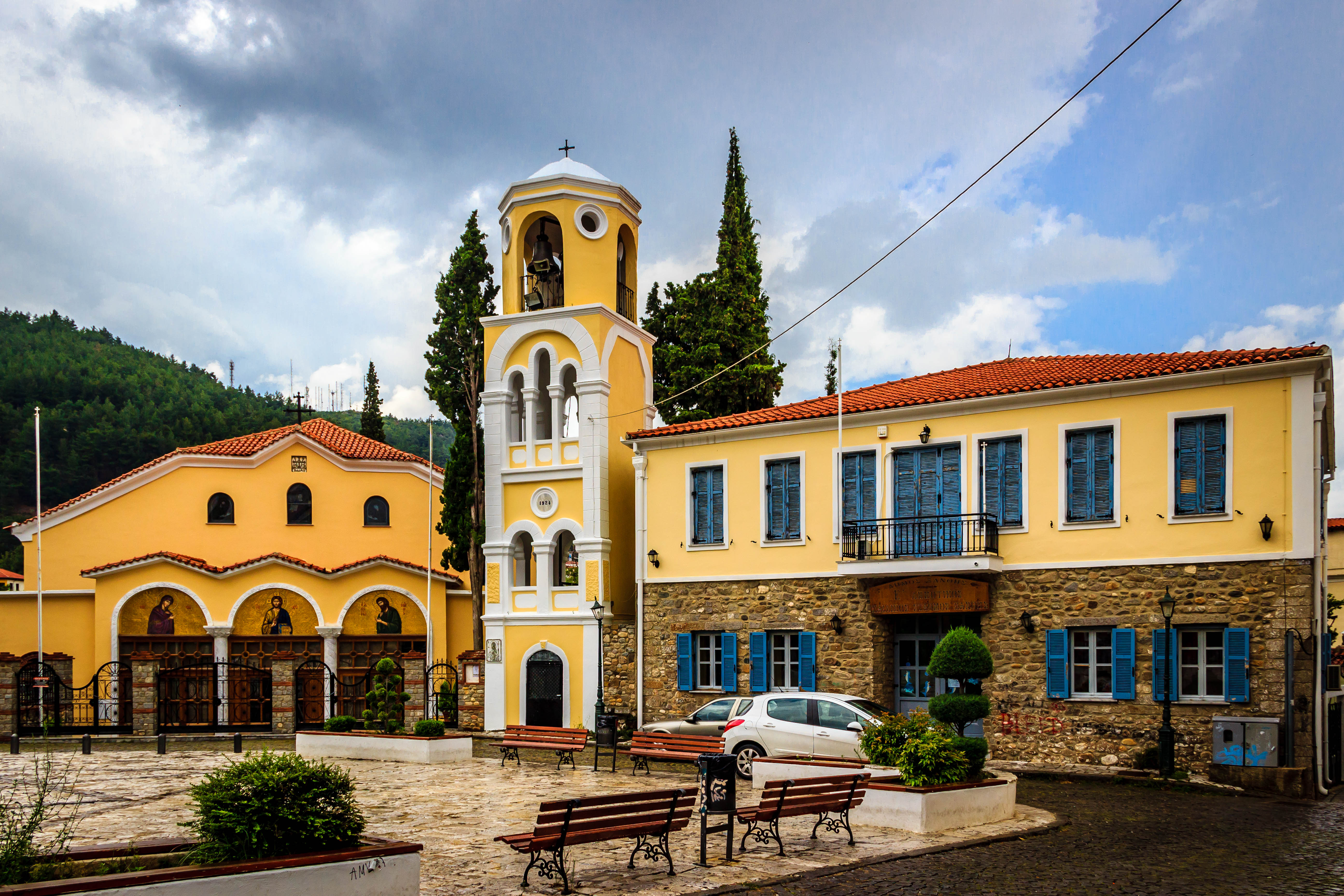
The Metropolitan Cathedral of Saint John the Baptist.

By 1715, Xanthi, as well as Genisea, became renowned for its tobacco quality. Many foreign sightseers traveled throughout the region and described both the life and struggles of the locals. The tobacco trade throughout Europe led Xanthi into a course of prosperity. George Demetriou was active in the Xanthi area during the Greek Revolution of 1821. In March and April 1829 two earthquakes leveled the city, however, they played a decisive role in the further developments as the city's rebuilding immediately got underway. In 1870, the city of Genisea was burned down and thus all of the agencies and services were transferred to Xanthi which, at that time, had a population of about 10,000 inhabitants. In 1891, a rail line was established near the city, while further economic development led to the founding of schools and associations. During the late period of Ottoman rule until 1912, the city was administratively located in the Sanjak of Gümülcine within the Adrianople Vilayet.

=== Balkan Wars ===
During the First Balkan War, Xanthi was captured by the Bulgarian army from the Ottomans on 8 November 1912. In the Second Balkan War the Greek army captured it in July 1913. However, with the Treaty of Bucharest, Xanthi along with Western Thrace were ceded to Bulgaria (where it was also called Скеча Skecha), and remained a part of the latter until the end of World War I. Following the Bulgarian defeat in this war, Western Thrace came under Allied administration and on 4 October 1919 the Greek army under Georgios Leonardopoulos command entered the city. That date is today celebrated in Xanthi as the anniversary of its liberation. Second lieutenant Gavriel Ladas, who was from Xanthi, led the first Greek troops in the city. Ladas became the mayor of Xanthi from 1959 to 1964.

=== World War II ===
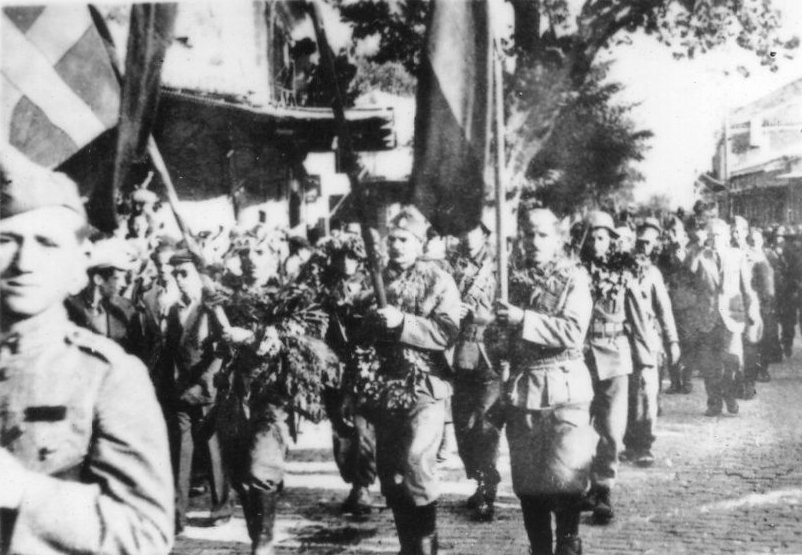
Guerrillas of the Greek People's Liberation Army in Xanthi during World War II

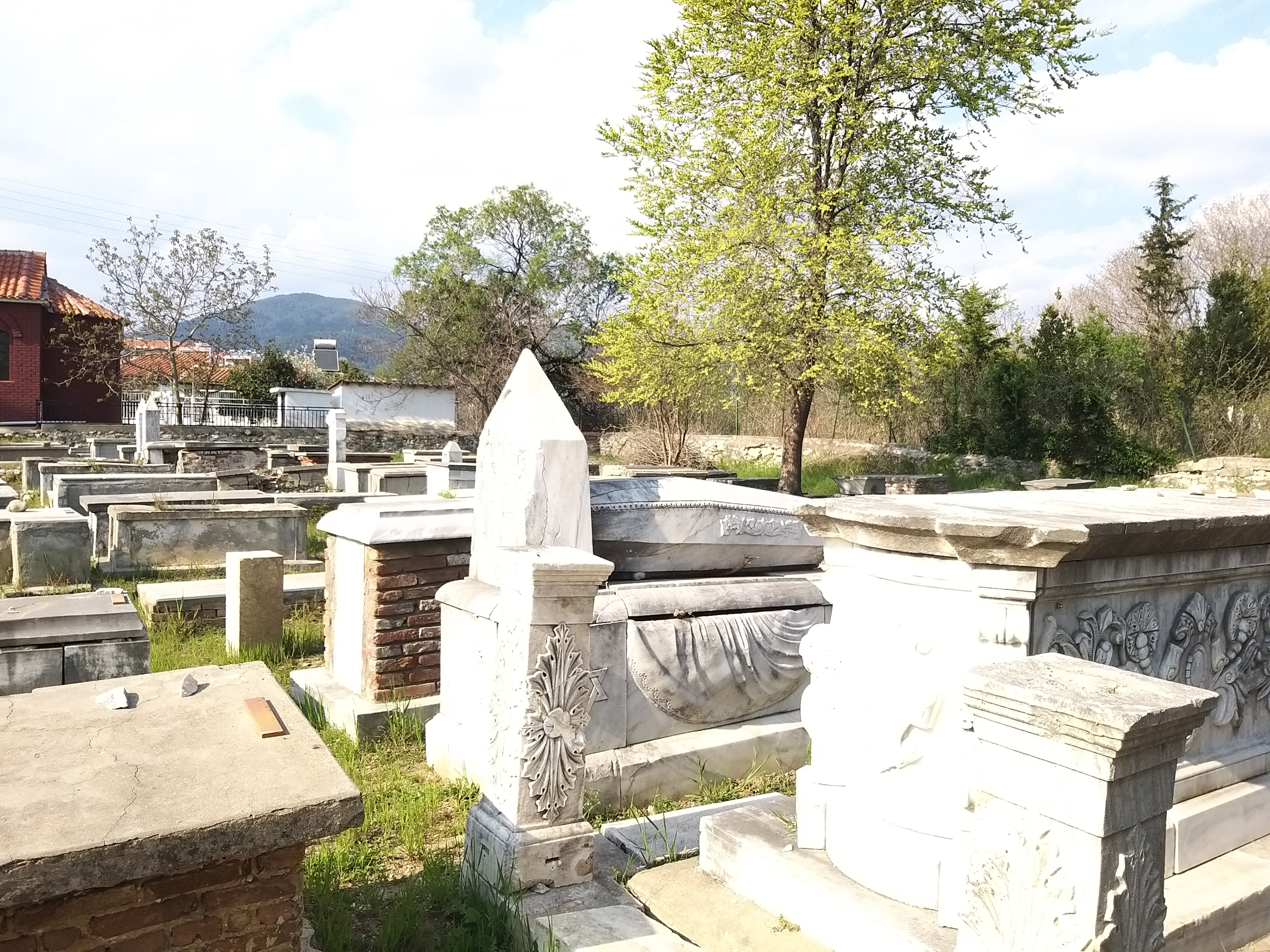
The Jewish cemetery of Xanthi after its restoration by Association PAKETHRA in 2015.

On 8 April 1941 the 164th Infantry Division captured Xanthi following the German invasion of Greece and the Germans passed the city to Bulgaria, who occupied the whole region east of Strymonas, except a small German zone near the border with Turkey. The city became the administrative center of the Bulgarian province of Belomorie and served as headquarters for the Bulgarian Second Army. During the Bulgarian occupation, more than 2,000 men from Xanthi, both Christians and Muslims were sent for forced labor in Bulgaria. On 4 March 1943 the Jews of Xanthi were arrested by the Bulgarians and imprisoned in a tobacco warehouse. On 18 and 19 March, they were deported to Nazi concentration camps in Poland. From a community of 550 people, only six Jews survived the Holocaust. The synagogue of Xanthi built in 1926 at the corner of Hatzistavrou and Anatolikis Thrakis streets, was used by Christian Associations and later abandoned. It was sold and demolished in 1995. The city was liberated following the 9 September coup d'etat in Bulgaria when partisans of the Greek People's Liberation Army entered the city and took over control without a fight. However, the Bulgarian army remained in the region until the end of October 1944 and it withdrew under pressure from the Allies.

=== Today ===
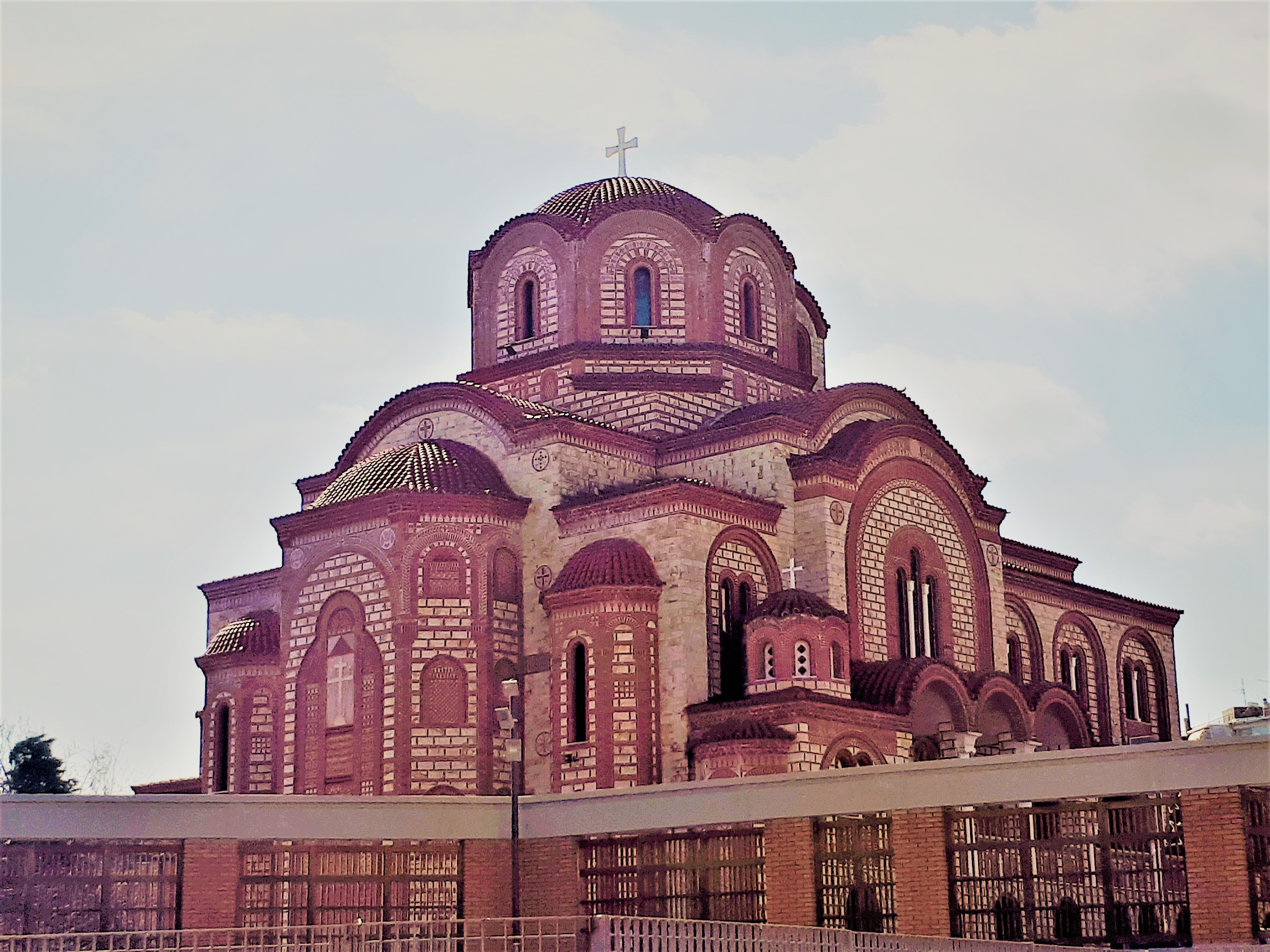
The Cathedral of Saint Sophia.

Nowadays Xanthi is a modern city, rich in history, traditions and customs, and with many attractions for the visitors (including the surrounding areas). Xanthi is known as the city of a thousand colours, and like Komotini (Gümülcine) and Didymoteicho (Dimetoka) has a large population of Turkish-speaking Muslims. The Muslim population of East Macedonia and Thrace dates to the Ottoman period, and unlike the Ottoman Muslims and Greek Muslims of Greek Macedonia and Crete was exempted from the 1922–23 Greek-Turkish population exchange following the Treaty of Lausanne. In 1972 the Greek authorities planned to demolish the landmark of the city, the clock tower, built by Pomak Hadji Emin Aga in 1870. This decision resulted in protests by the local Muslims and the plans were cancelled.

== Transport ==
=== Road Transport ===
A few kilometers outside Xanthi, the Egnatia Motorway crosses Xanthi with Macedonia, Epirus and the rest of Thrace. The Xanthi Bus Station runs daily services to several cities throughout Greece. Xanthi is 206 km from Thessaloniki, 704 km from Athens, 397 km from Istanbul and 236 km from Edirne. On 15 January 2010, the Agios Konstantinos border crossing point between Greece and Bulgaria was inaugurated, 51 km from Xanthi, linking the nearby village of Thermes with the town of Zlatograd. A link road between the A2 motorway and the Bulgarian town of Rudozem is to be opened on 1 January 2025 via the Aegean Pass.

=== Rail transport ===
Outside Xanthi is the Xanthi railway station on the Thessaloniki-Alexandroupoli line, with daily services to Thessaloniki and Alexandroupolis.

=== Air Transport ===
Xanthi does not have an airport. It is mainly served by Kavala Airport, 42 km away, and secondarily by Alexandroupolis Airport, 112 km away.

== Municipality ==
The municipality Xanthi was formed at the 2011 local government reform by the merger of the following 2 former municipalities, that became municipal units:

- Stavroupoli
- Xanthi

The municipality has an area of 495.118 km^{2}, the municipal unit 153.116 km^{2}.

=== Communities ===
The municipal unit Xanthi is subdivided into the communities Evmoiro, Kimmeria and Xanthi. These communities contain the following settlements:

- Evmoiro
  - Kallithea
  - Lamprino
  - Lefki
  - Nea Morsini
  - Palaia Morsini
  - Petrochori
- Kimmeria
  - Gialisteri
  - Livadi
  - Pelekito
  - The abandoned villages Alikochori, Anthiro, Askyra, Eranos, Ketiki, Porta, Prioni and Ydrochori
- Xanthi

== Economy ==
Traditionally, the tobacco business, commerce, and farming have been the primary occupation of the residents of the area. During the last decades, tourism has also increased, especially during the period of the "Old Town Festival".

== Population ==
Year	Population
1940	31,015
1951	27,283
1961	27,802
1971	27,040
1981	33,897
1991	38,808
2001	46,464
2011	56,151
2021	58,760

== Education ==
Aerial view of the campus of Democritus University in Xanthi

Xanthi hosts the School of Engineering of the Democritus University of Thrace since 1974. It consists of the following departments:

- Department of Electrical and Computer Engineering
- Department of Civil Engineering
- Department of Environmental Engineering
- Department of Architectural Engineering
- Department of Production Management Engineering

== Cultural events ==
=== Carnival and old town's festivals ===
The city has a rich history, tradition, and customs and it is the cultural center in the area. It is also considered a multi-cultural city and it has been characterized as "the city of the thousand colours". Xanthi's Carnival is very popular (every February) and is one of the most popular in Greece, while the "old town festival" (early September) is equally famous. Furthermore, the bazaar of Xanthi is famous and takes place at Emboriou Square every Saturday. In addition, the Manos Hatzidakis' festival attracts worldwide interest.

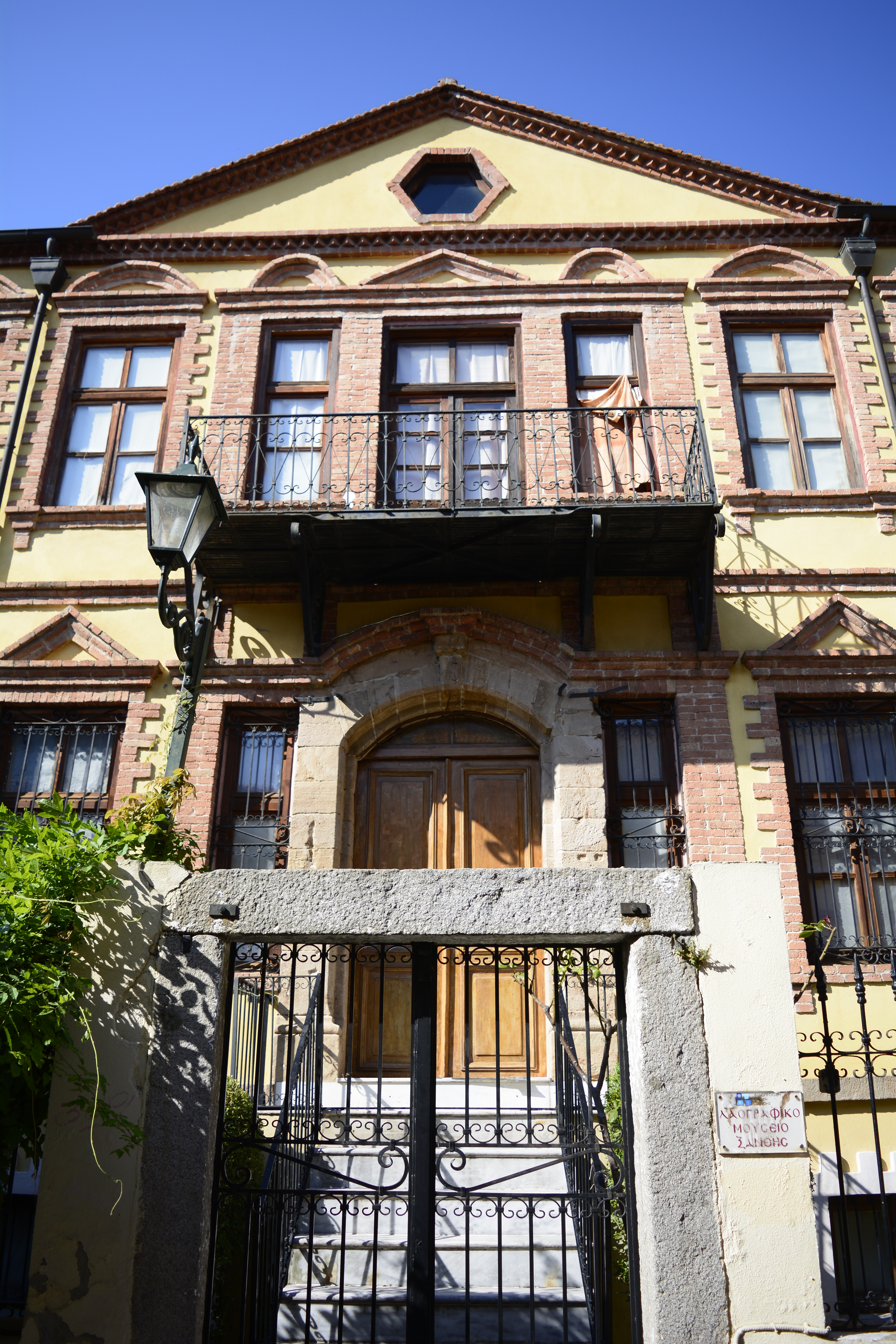
The entrance of the Folklore and Historical Museum

=== Museums ===
- Folklore and Historical Museum of Xanthi
- Εcclesiastical Museum Metropolis of Xanthi
- Municipal Gallery of Xanthi
- Museum of Natural History
- Foundation of Thracian Art and Tradition
- Museum of the History of the Greek Costume
- Manos Hadjidakis House

== Sports ==
Xanthi FC Arena

- Xanthi FC, plays in the Gamma Ethniki
- Xanthi BC (1999-2010), played in the Greek A2 League
- Aspida Xanthi, football (one appearance in the First League) and basketball
- Orfeas Xanthi FC, football
- Orion Xanthi, basketball

== Famous people from Xanthi ==
- Manos Hadjidakis (1925–1994): Major Greek composer. Winner of the Academy Award for Best Original Song for his song Never on Sunday from the film of the same name.
- Şerif Gören: Turkish film director. Winner of 1982 Palme d'Or in Cannes Film Festival
- Yanaki Paskalev (1863–1933): Bulgarian revolutionary, member of IMORO
- Archbishop Christodoulos (1939–2008): former Archbishop of the Greek Orthodox Church
- Vasilis Torosidis: football player for Olympiacos F.C. and the Greece national football team
- Lambros Papantoniou (Mandra, Xanthi 1945-Washington, USA 2009): journalist, political analyst.
- Zafeiris Melas, contemporary Greek laïko singer.
- Tsigdem Asafoglou, The Party of Friendship, Equality and Peace General President
- Apostolos Roumoglou, basketball player for the UConn Huskies.
- Nana Aidona, governor of Central Macedonia since 2024.

== International relations ==
Xanthi is twinned with:

- Smolyan, Bulgaria
- Novi Beograd, Serbia
- Gifhorn, Lower Saxony, Germany
- Biga, Turkey (since 2000)
- Bursa, Turkey
- Adra, Spain

== Gallery ==
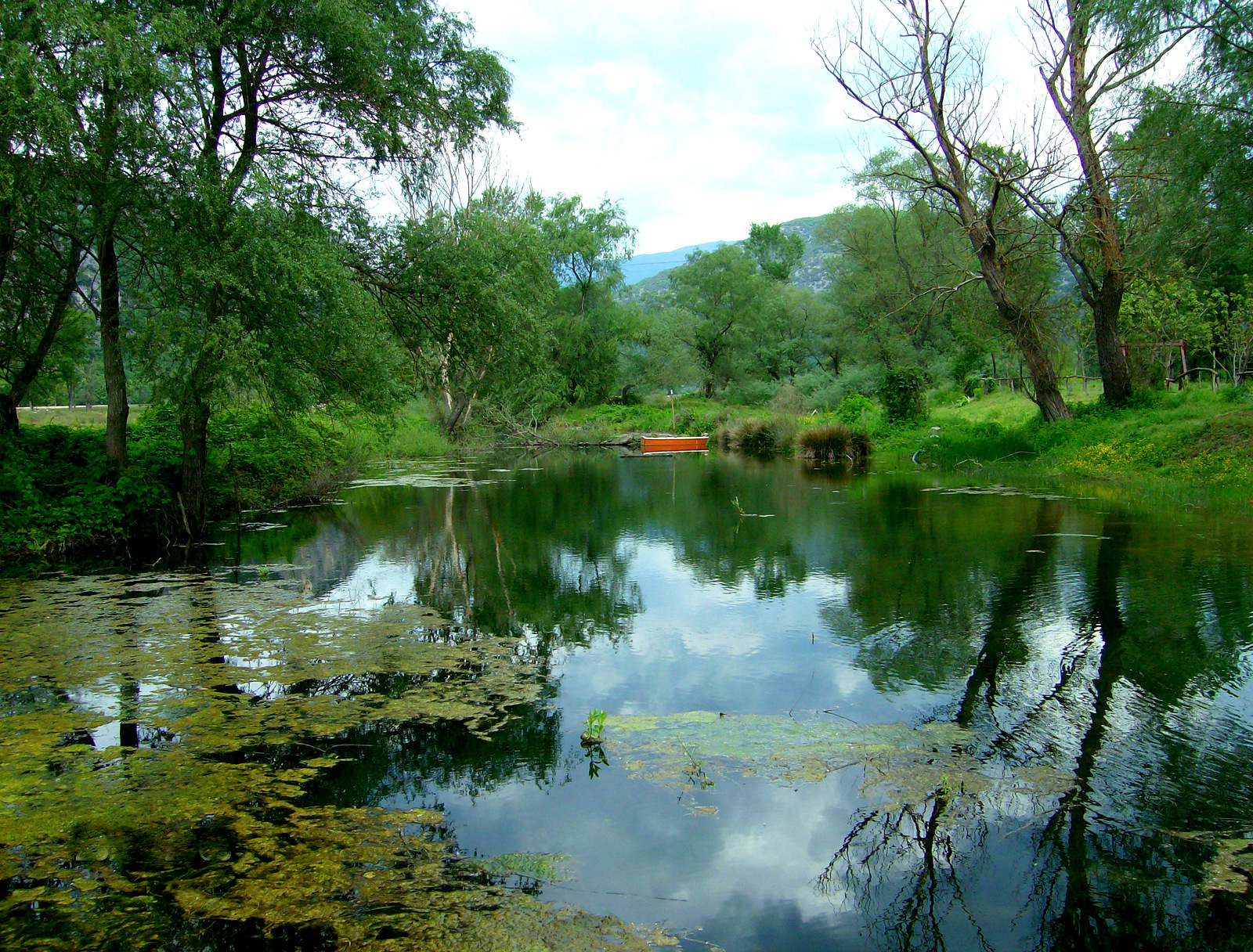
Nestos river outside the city

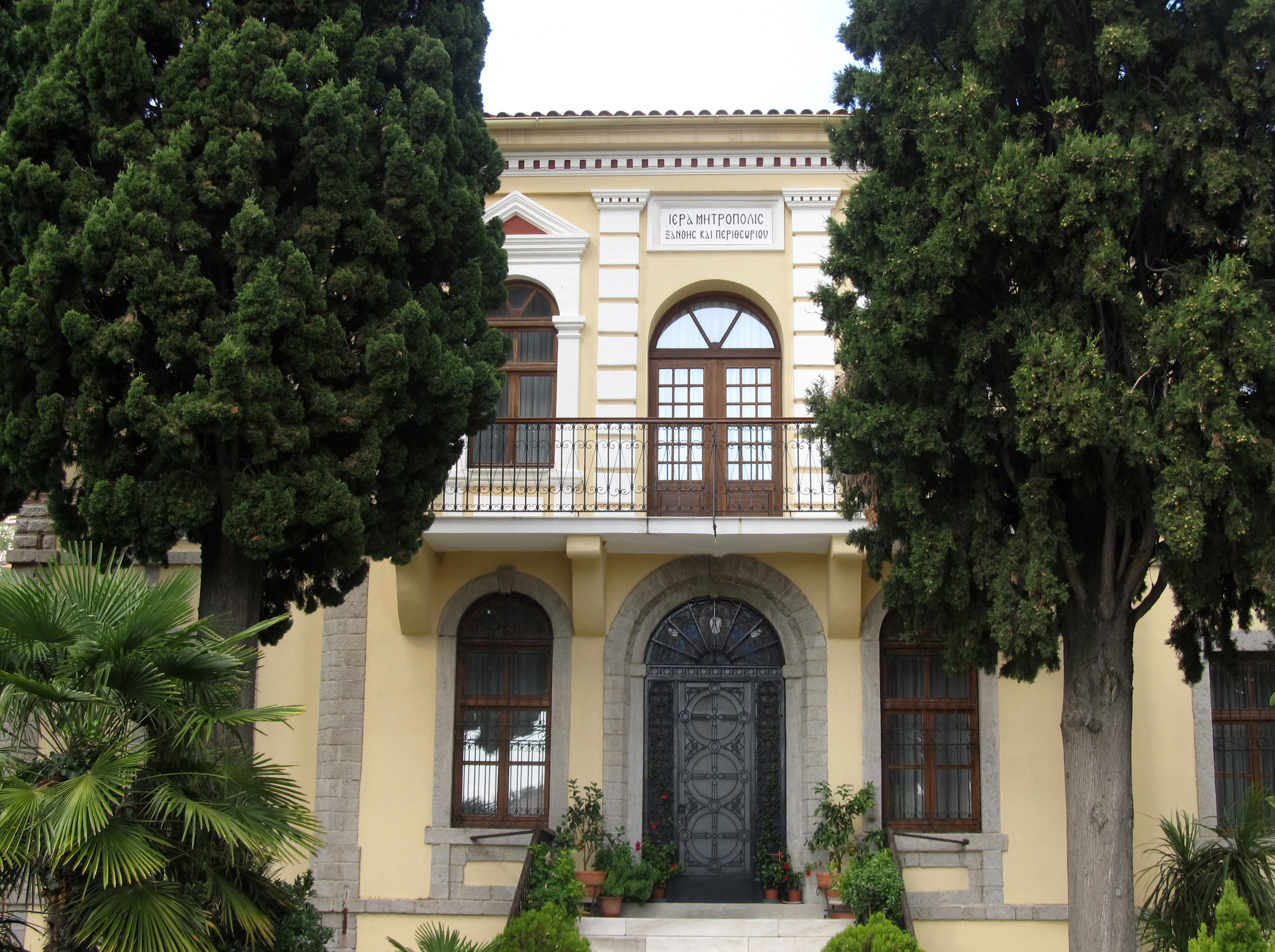
Greek Orthodox Metropolis

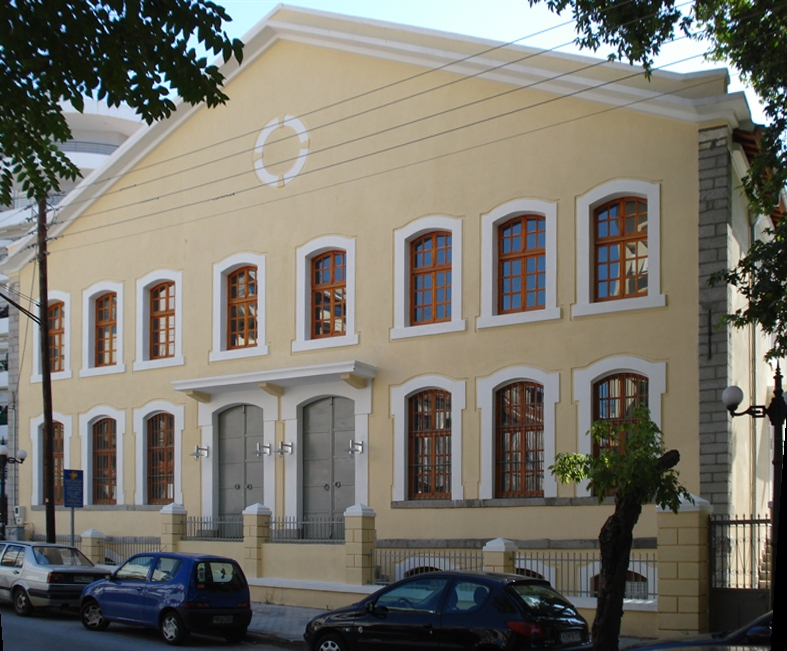
Old tobacco warehouses, today a restored museum

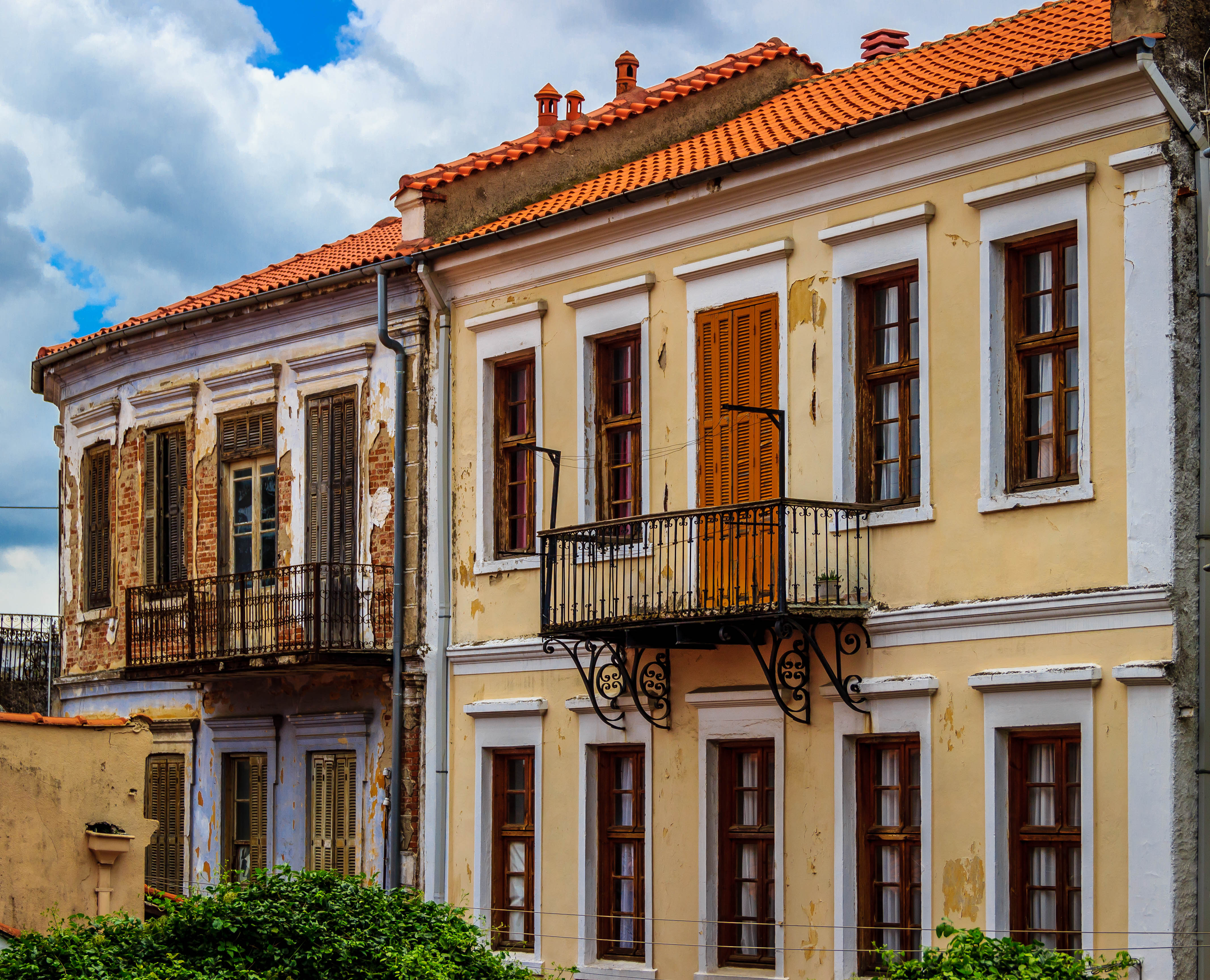
Old mansions

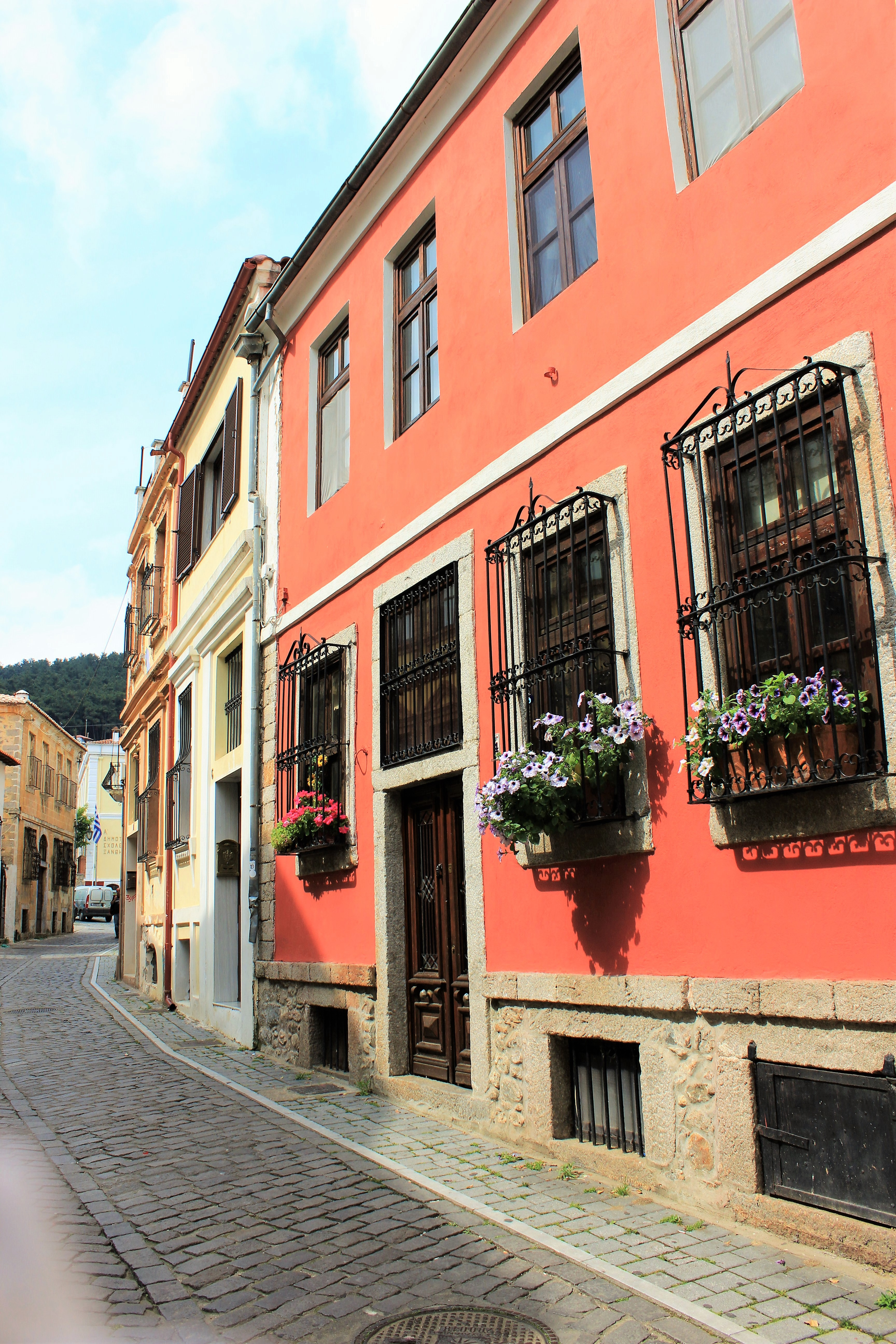
Old town street

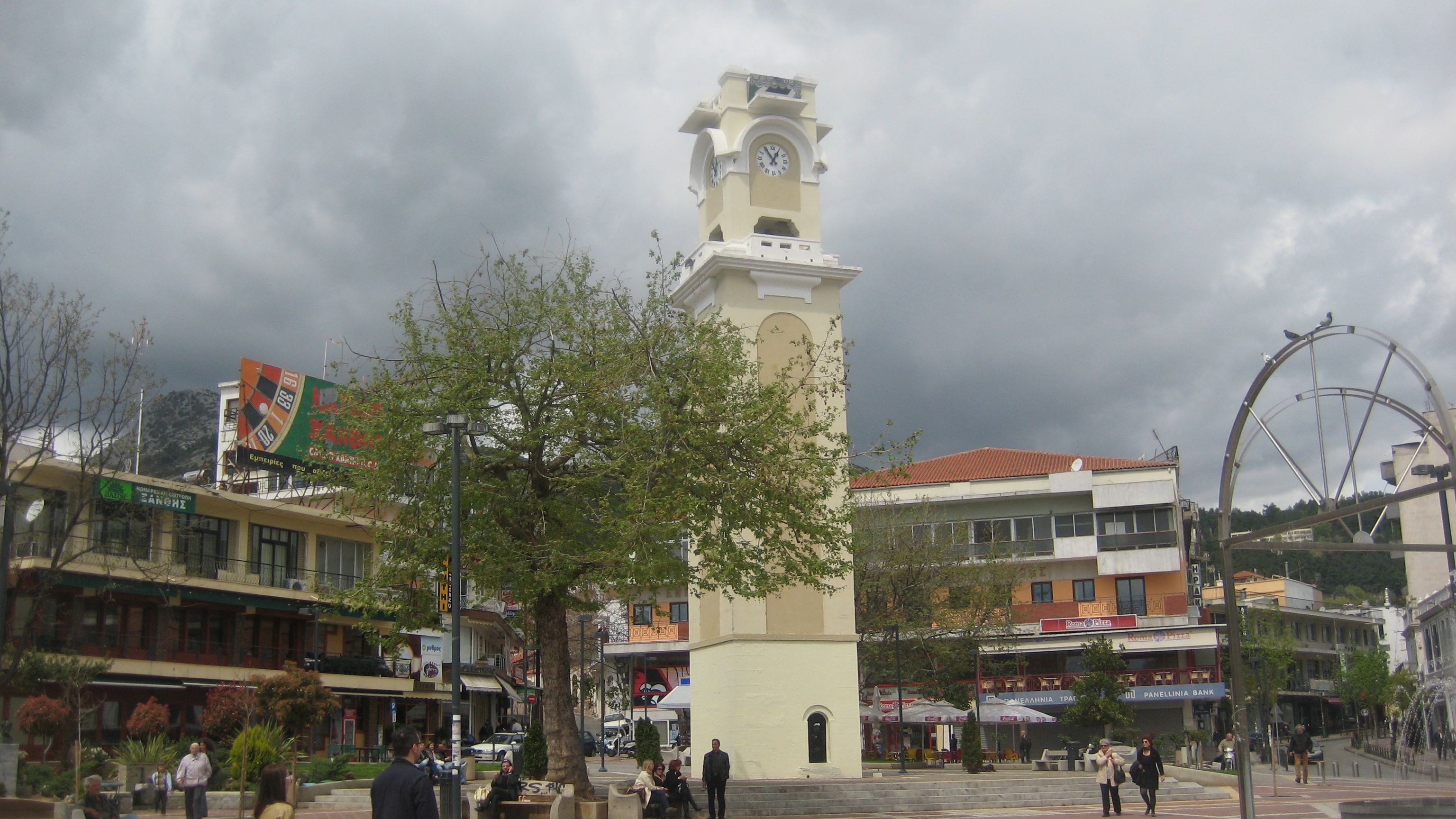
Xanthi clock tower

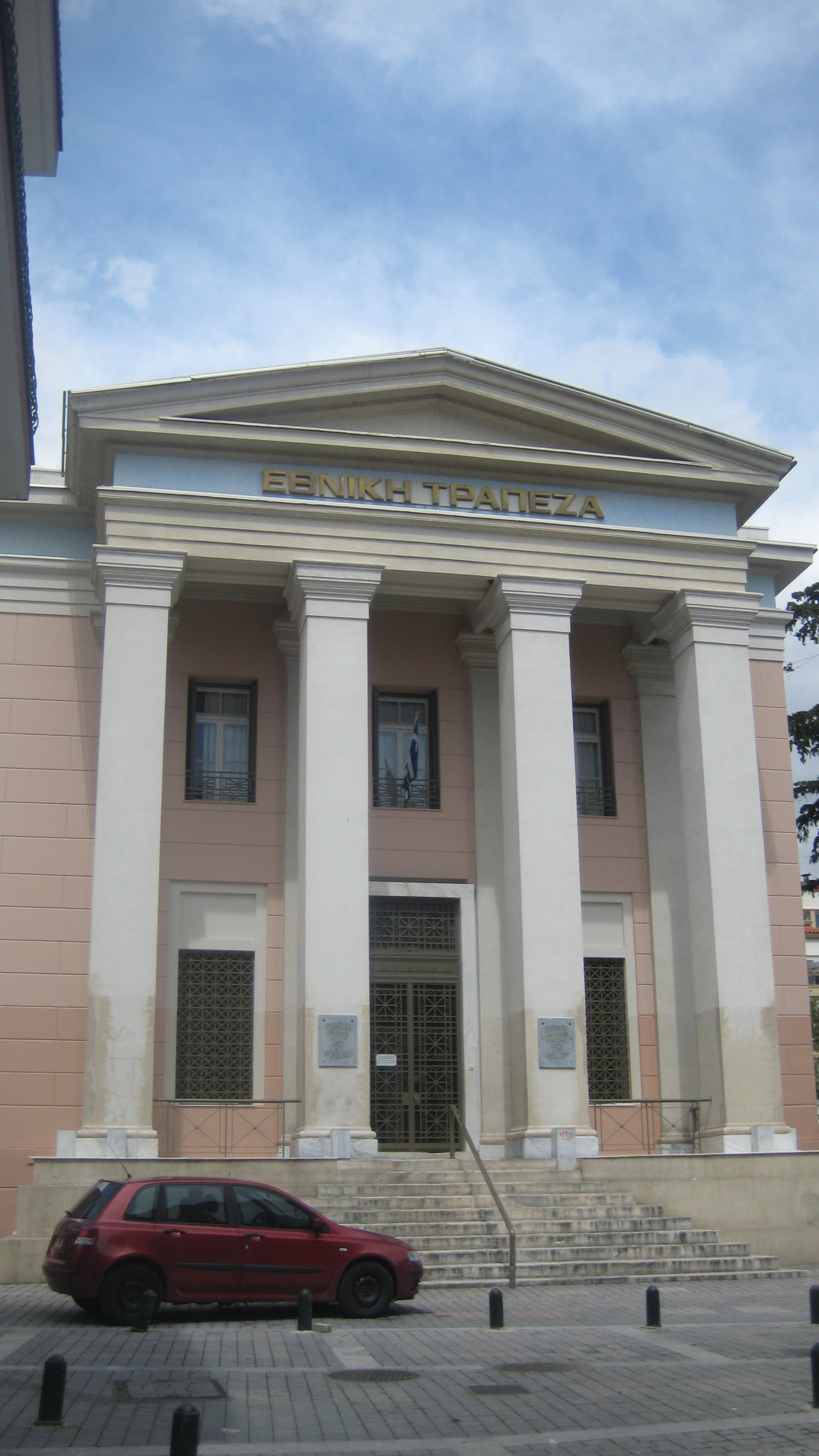
National Bank of Greece building

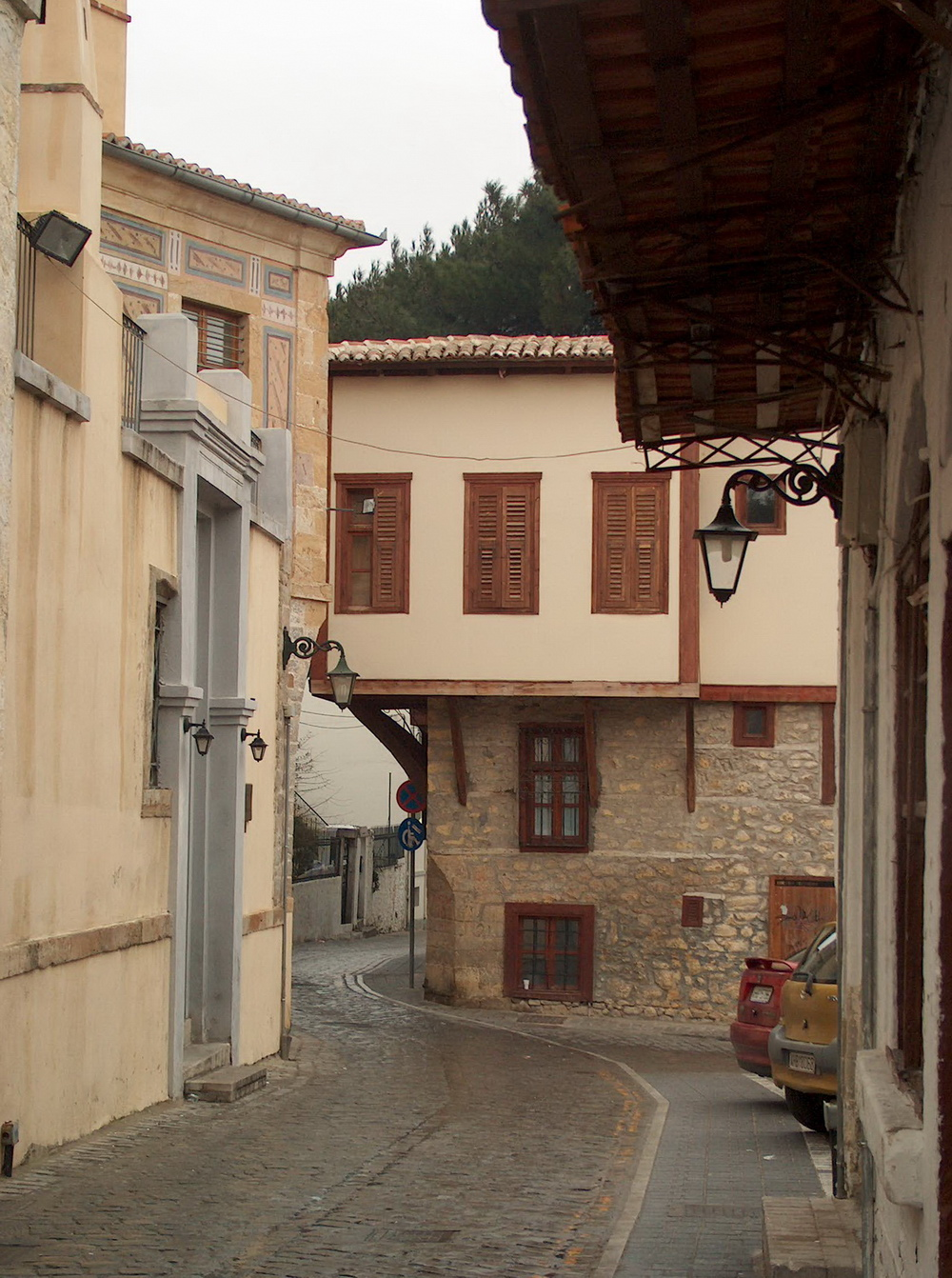
Old town

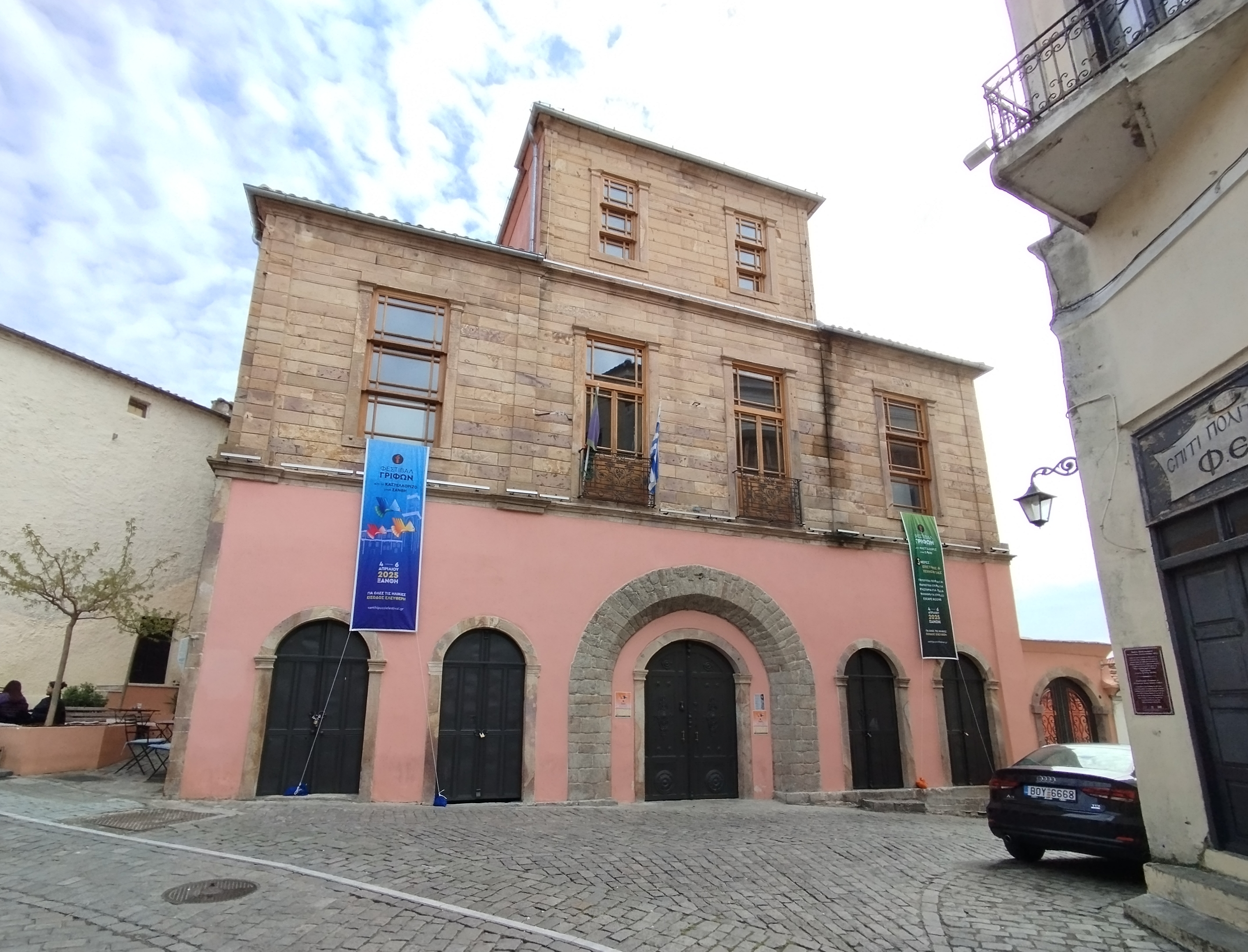
The old city hall in the old town of Xanthi

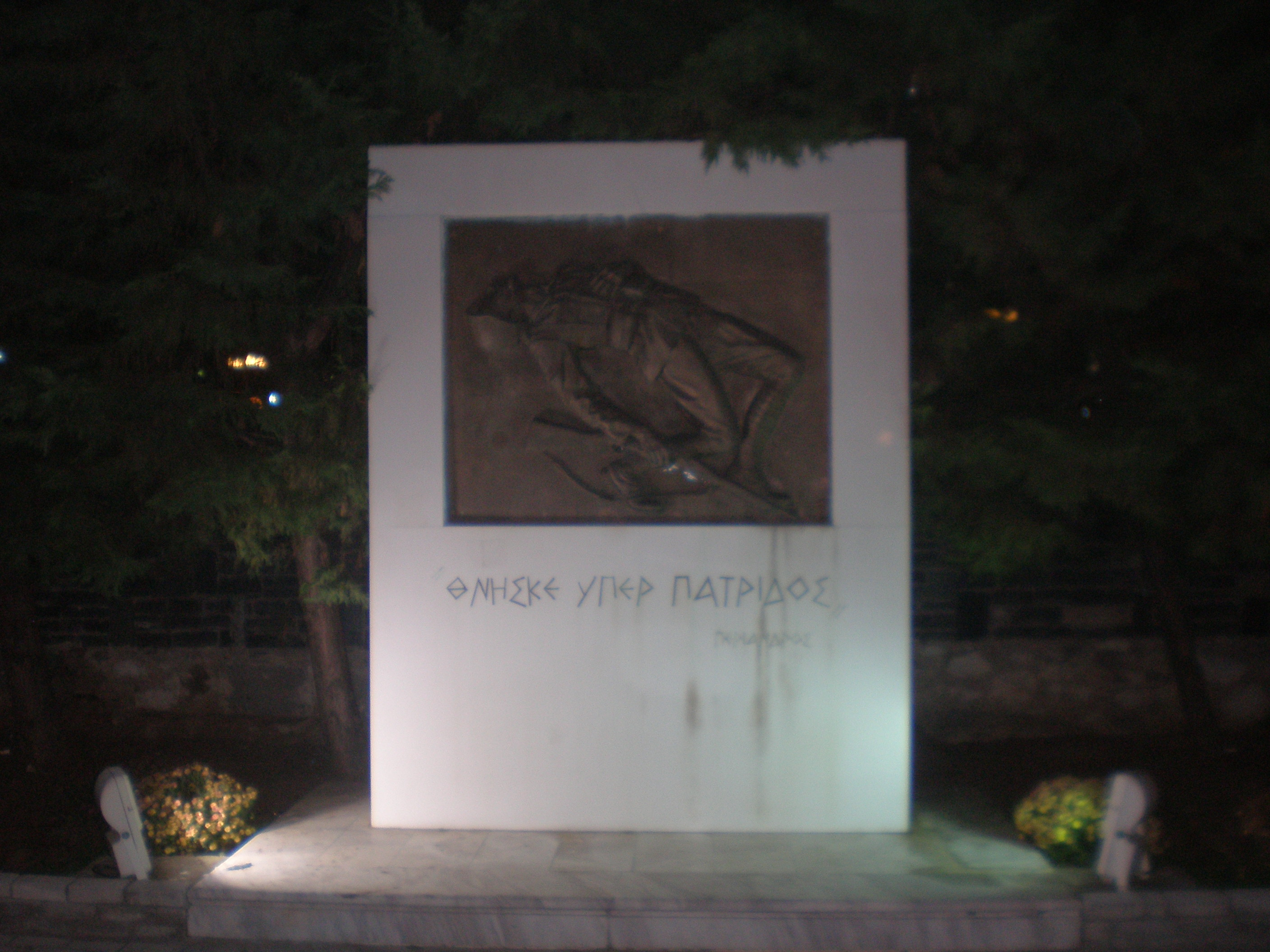
War memorial

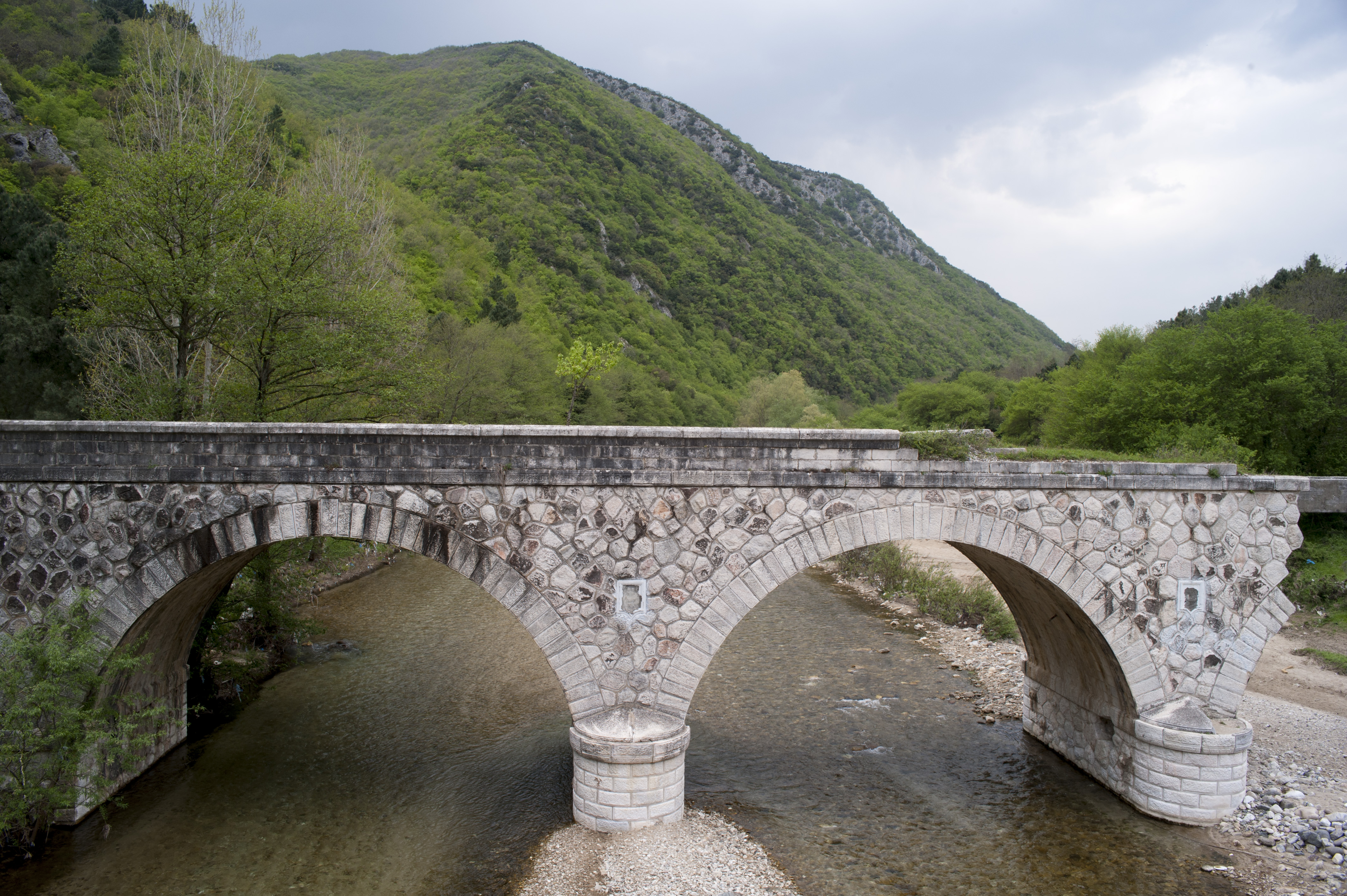
Ottoman bridge Xanthi-Stavroupoli

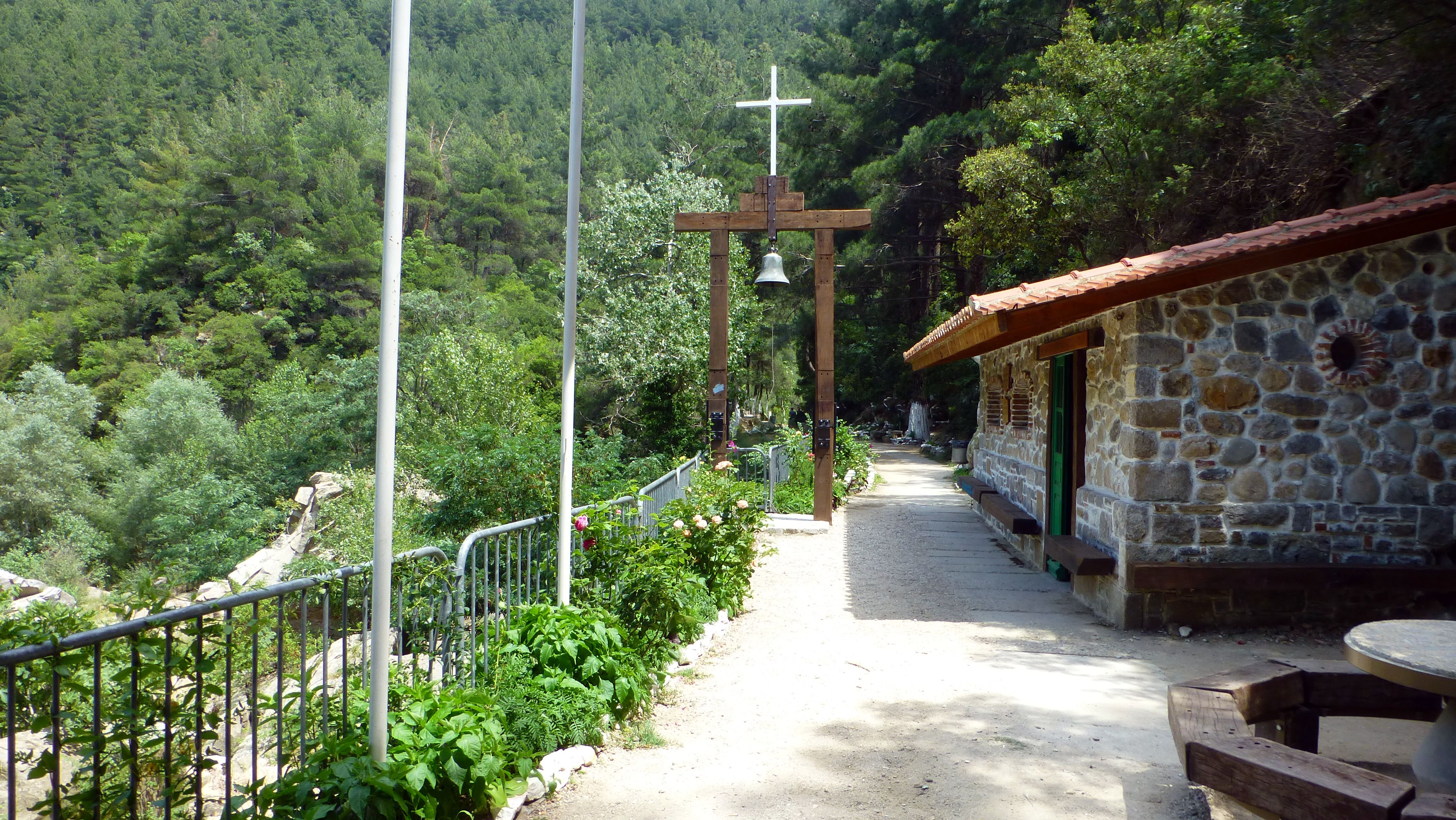
Chapel of St. George and Archangel Michael

== See also ==
- Xanthi (regional unit)
- Eastern Macedonia and Thrace
- Thrace
- Western Thrace
- Xanthi Carnival
